= Austria national football team results (1960–1979) =

- Win Draw Loss

This is a list of the Austria national football team results from 1960 to 1979.

== 1960 ==
27 March 1960 European Nations' Cup qualifying R16 2L	Austria	2–4	France	Vienna, Austria
	Nemec 27'; Probst 64'		Marcel 46'; Rahis 59'; Heutte 77'; Kopa 83' (pen.)	Stadium: Praterstadion; Attendance: 38,000; Referee: Leo Helge (Denmark)

1 May International Friendly	Czechoslovakia	4–0	Austria	Prague, Czechoslovakia
	Masopust 12'; Moravčík 26'; Dolinský 30'; Kvašňák 67'			Stadium: Strahov Stadium; Attendance: 20,000; Referee: Bengt Andrén (Sweden)

29 May International Friendly	Austria	4–1	Scotland	Vienna, Austria
	Hanappi 28', 32'; Hof 44', 62'		Mackay 76'	Stadium: Praterstadion; Attendance: 55,000; Referee: Albert Dusch (West Germany)

22 June International Friendly	Norway	1–2	Austria	Oslo, Norway
	Backe 32'		Hamerl 68'; Hof 89'	Stadium: Ullevaal Stadion; Attendance: 24,774; Referee: Åge Poulsen (Denmark)

4 September International Friendly	Austria	3–1	Soviet Union	Vienna, Austria
	Hof 47' (pen.), 88'; Flögel 85'		Ponedelnik 32'	Stadium: Praterstadion; Attendance: 87,000; Referee: Paul Wyssling (Switzerland)

30 October International Friendly	Austria	3–0	Spain	Vienna, Austria
	Senekowitsch 34'; Nemec 77'; Hof 79'			Stadium: Praterstadion; Attendance: 91,000; Referee: Gottfried Dienst (Switzerland)

20 November International Friendly	Hungary	2–0	Austria	Budapest, Hungary
	Göröcs 75'; Machos 90'			Stadium: Népstadion; Attendance: 70,000; Referee: Johan Martens (Netherlands)

10 December International Friendly	Italy	1–2	Austria	Naples, Italy
	Boniperti 27'		Hof 7'; Kaltenbrunner 55'	Stadium: Stadio San Paolo; Attendance: 15,000; Referee: Pierre Schwinte (France)

== 1961 ==
27 May International Friendly	Austria	3–1	England	Vienna, Austria
	Hof 3'; Nemec 25'; Senekowitsch 80'		Greaves 16'	Stadium: Praterstadion; Attendance: 90,726; Referee: Karol Galba (Czechoslovakia)

11 June International Friendly	Hungary	1–2	Austria	Budapest, Hungary
	Göröcs 44'		Rafreider 15'; Nemec 54'	Stadium: Népstadion; Attendance: 80,000; Referee: Gottfried Dienst (Switzerland)

10 September International Friendly	Soviet Union	0–1	Austria	Moscow, Soviet Union
			Rafreider 7'	Stadium: Lenin Central Stadium; Attendance: 102,000; Referee: Bertil Lööw (Sweden)

8 October International Friendly	Austria	2–1	Hungary	Vienna, Austria
	Hof 13'; Oslansky 82'		Tichy 9'	Stadium: Praterstadion; Attendance: 86,000; Referee: Václav Korelus (Czechoslovakia)

19 November International Friendly	Yugoslavia	2–1	Austria	Zagreb, Yugoslavia
	Jerković 2', 75'		Nemec 29'	Stadium: Stadion Maksimir; Attendance: 43,000; Referee: János Pósa (Hungary)

== 1962 ==
5 January International Friendly	Egypt	1–0	Austria	Cairo, Egypt
	Fattah 18'			Stadium: Cairo International Stadium; Attendance: 35,000; Referee: Kurt Tschenscher (West Germany)

4 April International Friendly	England	3–1	Austria	London, England
	Crawford 7'; Flowers 38' (pen.); Hunt 68'		Buzek 76'	Stadium: Wembley Stadium; Attendance: 50,000; Referee: Pierre Schwinte (France)

8 April International Friendly	Republic of Ireland	2–3	Austria	Dublin, Ireland
	Cantwell 47'; Tuohy 58'		Buzek 43'; Hirnschrodt 57'; Hof 63'	Stadium: Dalymount Park; Attendance: 23,000; Referee: Josef Gulde (Switzerland)

6 May International Friendly	Austria	2–0	Bulgaria	Vienna, Austria
	Hof 69' (pen.); Rakarov 75' (o.g.)			Stadium: Praterstadion; Attendance: 65,000; Referee: Milan Kusák (Czechoslovakia)

24 June International Friendly	Austria	1–2	Hungary	Vienna, Austria
	Nemec 61'		Tichy 42', 63'	Stadium: Praterstadion; Attendance: 70,000; Referee: Albert Dusch (West Germany)

16 September International Friendly	Austria	0–6	Czechoslovakia	Vienna, Austria
			Kučera 14', 65'; Masopust 21', 32'; Scherer 55'; Kadraba 79'	Stadium: Praterstadion; Attendance: 76,000; Referee: Pierre Schwinte (France)

28 October International Friendly	Hungary	2–0	Austria	Budapest, Hungary
	Göröcs 22'; Sándor 90'			Stadium: Népstadion; Attendance: 50,000; Referee: Jozef Kandlbinder (West Germany)

11 November International Friendly	Austria	1–2	Italy	Vienna, Austria
	Nemec 90'		Pascutti 64', 77'	Stadium: Praterstadion; Attendance: 60,000; Referee: Joseph Barbéran (France)

25 November International Friendly	Bulgaria	1–1	Austria	Sofia, Bulgaria
	Kolev 40' (pen.)		Nemec 74'	Stadium: Vasil Levski National Stadium; Attendance: 55,000; Referee: Hakkı Gürüz (Turkey)

== 1963 ==
24 April International Friendly	Austria	3–1	Czechoslovakia	Vienna, Austria
	Nemec 48', 69', 70'		Mašek 68'	Stadium: Praterstadion; Attendance: 76,000; Referee: Pierre Schwinte (France)

8 May International Friendly	Scotland	4–1	Austria	Glasgow, Scotland
	Wilson 16', 20'; Law 28', 71'		Linhart 77'	Stadium: Hampden Park; Attendance: 94,596; Referee: Jim Finney (England)

9 June International Friendly	Austria	0–1	Italy	Vienna, Austria
			Trapattoni 56'	Stadium: Praterstadion; Attendance: 38,000; Referee: Jozef Kandlbinder (West Germany)

25 September 1964 European Nations' Cup round of 16; 1L	Austria	0–0	Republic of Ireland	Vienna, Austria
				Stadium: Praterstadion; Attendance: 26,741; Referee: Gere Gyula (Hungary)

13 October 1964 European Nations' Cup round of 16; 2L	Republic of Ireland	3–2	Austria	Dublin, Ireland
	Cantwell 44', 89' (pen.); Fogarty 64'		Koleznik 38'; Flögel 83'	Stadium: Dalymount Park; Attendance: 39,963; Referee: Åge Poulsen (Denmark)

27 October International Friendly	Hungary	2–1	Austria	Budapest, Hungary
	Albert 16'; Sándor 29'		Viehböck 79'	Stadium: Népstadion; Attendance: 65,000; Referee: Pierre Schwinte (France)

14 December International Friendly	Italy	1–0	Austria	Turin, Italy
	Rivera 75'			Stadium: Stadio Comunale; Attendance: 35,000; Referee: Gérard Versyp (Belgium)

== 1964 ==
12 April International Friendly	Netherlands	1–1	Austria	Amsterdam, Netherlands
	Nuninga 25'		Flögel 2'	Stadium: Olympic Stadium; Attendance: 49,000; Referee: Milan Fencl (Czechoslovakia)

3 May International Friendly	Austria	1–0	Hungary	Vienna, Austria
	Nemec 55' (pen.)		Sárosi (red card) 84'	Stadium: Praterstadion; Attendance: 66,000; Referee: Pierre Schwinte (France)

14 May International Friendly	Austria	0–2	Uruguay	Vienna, Austria
			Castro 11', 68'	Stadium: Praterstadion; Attendance: 42,000; Referee: Milan Kusák (Czechoslovakia)

27 September International Friendly	Austria	3–2	Yugoslavia	Vienna, Austria
	Hasil 29'; Nemec 48', 90'		Melić 35'; Skoblar 56' (pen.)	Stadium: Praterstadion; Attendance: 55,000; Referee: Gere Gyula (Hungary)

13 October International Friendly	Austria	1–0	Soviet Union	Vienna, Austria
	Glechner 44'			Stadium: Praterstadion; Attendance: 72,000; Referee: Gottfried Dienst (Switzerland)

== 1965 ==
24 March International Friendly	France	1–2	Austria	Paris, France
	Hausser 28'		Seitl 15'; Koller 44'	Stadium: Parc des Princes; Attendance: 24,206; Referee: Franz Geluck (Belgium)

25 April 1966 FIFA World Cup qualification Group 6	Austria	1–1	East Germany	Vienna, Austria
	Hof 46'		Nöldner 74'	Stadium: Praterstadion; Attendance: 57,312; Referee: Nicolae Mihăilescu (Romania)

16 May International Friendly	Soviet Union	0–0	Austria	Moscow, Soviet Union
				Stadium: Lenin Central Stadium; Attendance: 40,000; Referee: Gyula Emsberger (Hungary)

13 June 1966 FIFA World Cup qualification Group 6	Austria	0–1	Hungary	Vienna, Austria
			Fenyvesi 44'	Stadium: Praterstadion; Attendance: 70,067; Referee: Pierre Schwinte (France)

5 September 1966 FIFA World Cup qualification Group 6	Hungary	3–0	Austria	Budapest, Hungary
	Farkas 4'; Fenyvesi 35'; Mészöly 70' (pen.)			Stadium: Népstadion; Attendance: 71,950; Referee: Antoni Gorączniak (Poland)

9 October International Friendly	West Germany	4–1	Austria	Stuttgart, West Germany
	Sieloff 33'; Ulsaß 47', 64', 81'		Buzek 23'	Stadium: Neckarstadion; Attendance: 74,000; Referee: Gottfried Dienst (Switzerland)

20 October International Friendly	England	2–3	Austria	London, England
	Charlton 3'; Connelly 59'		Flögel 53'; Fritsch 73', 80'	Stadium: Wembley Stadium; Attendance: 65,000; Referee: Pierre Schwinte (France)

31 October 1966 FIFA World Cup qualification Group 6	East Germany	1–0	Austria	Leipzig, East Germany
	Nöldner 1'			Stadium: Zentralstadion; Attendance: 86,854; Referee: Samuel Carswell (Northern Ireland)

== 1966 ==
24 April International Friendly	Austria	0–1	Soviet Union	Vienna, Austria
			Voronin 19'	Stadium: Praterstadion; Attendance: 67,000; Referee: Gyula Emsberger (Hungary)

22 May International Friendly	Austria	1–0	Republic of Ireland	Vienna, Austria
	Seitl 76'			Stadium: Praterstadion; Attendance: 33,000; Referee: Gyula Gere (Hungary)

18 June International Friendly	Italy	1–0	Austria	Milan, Italy
	Burgnich 73'			Stadium: San Siro; Attendance: 35,000; Referee: Bertil Lööw (Sweden)

18 September International Friendly	Austria	2–1	Netherlands	Vienna, Austria
	Sara 12'; Viehböck 74'		Glechner 38' (o.g.)	Stadium: Praterstadion; Attendance: 32,000; Referee: Concetto Lo Bello (Italy)

2 October UEFA Euro 1968 qualifying Group 3	Finland	0–0	Austria	Helsinki, Finland
				Stadium: Helsinki Olympic Stadium; Attendance: 10,070; Referee: Peter Coates (Ireland)

5 October International Friendly	Sweden	4–1	Austria	Stockholm, Sweden
	Lundblad 23'; Kindvall 58'; Turesson 65', 68'		Flögel 79'	Stadium: Råsunda Stadium; Attendance: 19,194; Referee: Kęstutis Andziulis (Soviet Union)

30 October International Friendly	Hungary	3–1	Austria	Budapest, Hungary
	Farkas 8', 74', 85'		Wolny 89'	Stadium: Népstadion; Attendance: 25,000; Referee: Othmar Huber (Switzerland)

== 1967 ==
27 May International Friendly	Austria	0–1	England	Vienna, Austria
			Ball 21'	Stadium: Praterstadion; Attendance: 50,000; Referee: Michel Kitabdjian (France)

11 June UEFA Euro 1968 qualifying Group 3	Soviet Union	4–3	Austria	Moscow, Soviet Union
	Malofeyev 25'; Byshovets 36'; Chislenko 43'; Streltsov 80'		Hof 38'; Wolny 53'; Siber 67'	Stadium: Lenin Central Stadium; Attendance: 104,000; Referee: Johan Boström (Sweden)

6 September International Friendly	Austria	1–3	Hungary	Vienna, Austria
	Hof 78'		Bene 40'; Farkas 53'; Varga 70'	Stadium: Praterstadion; Attendance: 53,519; Referee: Othmar Huber (Switzerland)

24 September UEFA Euro 1968 qualifying Group 3	Austria	2–1	Finland	Vienna, Austria
	Flögel 17'; Grausam 79'		Peltonen 57'	Stadium: Praterstadion; Attendance: 27,000; Referee: Milivoje Gugulović (Yugoslavia)

4 October UEFA Euro 1968 qualifying Group 3	Greece	4–1	Austria	Piraeus, Greece
	Sideris 28', 34', 62'; Papaioannou 75'		Grausam 61'	Stadium: Karaiskakis Stadium; Attendance: 34,552; Referee: Vasile Dumitrescu (Romania)

15 October UEFA Euro 1968 qualifying Group 3	Austria	1–0	Soviet Union	Vienna, Austria
	Grausam 61'			Stadium: Praterstadion; Attendance: 34,000; Referee: Todor Bechirov (Bulgaria)

5 November UEFA Euro 1968 qualifying Group 3	Austria	1–1	Greece	Vienna, Austria
	Siber 31'		Sideris 73'	Stadium: Praterstadion; Attendance: 31,969; Referee: Gyula Gere (Hungary)

== 1968 ==
1 May International Friendly	Austria	1–1	Romania	Linz, Austria
	Siber 85'		Kallo 8'	Stadium: Linzer Stadion; Attendance: 25,842; Referee: Karol Galba (Czechoslovakia)

11 June 1970 FIFA World Cup qualification Group 7	Austria	7–1	Cyprus	Vienna, Austria
	Hof 4' (pen.), 42', 53', 68', 75' (pen.); Redl 25'; Siber 73'		Kantzilieris 47'	Stadium: Praterstadion; Attendance: 27,171; Referee: János Biróczky (Hungary)

16 July International Friendly	Soviet Union	3–1	Austria	Leningrad, Soviet Union
	Vyun 12'; Gershkovich 49'; Asatiani 65'		Hof 40'	Stadium: Kirov Stadium; Attendance: 65,000; Referee: Hans Carlsson (Sweden)

22 September International Friendly	Switzerland	1–0	Austria	Bern, Switzerland
	Quentin 6'			Stadium: Wankdorf Stadium; Attendance: 19,494; Referee: Janus Aalbrecht (Netherlands)

13 October 1970 FIFA World Cup qualification Group 7	Austria	0–2	West Germany	Vienna, Austria
			Müller 16'; Eigenstiller 50' (o.g.)	Stadium: Praterstadion; Attendance: 67,115; Referee: Stanisław Eksztajn (Poland)

6 November 1970 FIFA World Cup qualification Group 7	Scotland	2–1	Austria	Glasgow, Scotland
	Law 61'; Bremner 76'		Starek 3'	Stadium: Hampden Park; Attendance: 80,856; Referee: Curt Liedberg (Sweden)

10 November International Friendly	Republic of Ireland	2–2	Austria	Dublin, Ireland
	Rogers 82'; Hale 82'		Redl 15'; Hof 50'	Stadium: Dalymount Park; Attendance: 18,000; Referee: Bobby Davidson (Scotland)

== 1969 ==
1 May 1970 FIFA World Cup qualification Group 7	Cyprus	1–2	Austria	Nicosia, Cyprus
	Euthimiadis 90'		Kreuz 27'; Redl 55'	Stadium: GSP Stadium (1902); Attendance: 5,247; Referee: Gocho Rusev (Bulgaria)

23 April International Friendly	Israel	1–1	Austria	Ramat Gan, Israel
	Feigenbaum 20'		Kreuz 39'	Stadium: Ramat Gan Stadium; Attendance: 32,000; Referee: Aurelio Angonese (Italy)

27 April International Friendly	Malta	1–3	Austria	Gżira, Malta
	Cini 46'		Köglberger 21', 62'; Kreuz 27'	Stadium: Empire Stadium; Attendance: 9,449; Referee: Fabio Monti (Italy)

10 May 1970 FIFA World Cup qualification Group 7	West Germany	1–0	Austria	Nuremberg, West Germany
	Müller 88'			Stadium: Städtisches Stadion; Attendance: 69,892; Referee: Radoslav Fiala (Czechoslovakia)

21 September International Friendly	Austria	1–1	West Germany	Vienna, Austria
	Pirkner 7'		Müller 16'	Stadium: Praterstadion; Attendance: 28,000; Referee: Concetto Lo Bello (Italy)

5 November 1970 FIFA World Cup qualification Group 7	Austria	2–0	Scotland	Vienna, Austria
	Redl 16', 54'			Stadium: Praterstadion; Attendance: 10.091; Referee: Karlo Kruashvili (Soviet Union)

== 1970 ==
8 April International Friendly	Yugoslavia	1–1	Austria	Sarajevo, Yugoslavia
	Bajević 46'		Redl 20'	Stadium: Koševo Stadion; Attendance: 6,985; Referee: István Zsolt (Hungary)

12 April International Friendly	Austria	1–3	Czechoslovakia	Vienna, Austria
	Migas 72' (o.g.)		Albrecht 26'; Hrdlička 27'; Adamec 35'	Stadium: Praterstadion; Attendance: 30,000; Referee: Anton Bucheli (Switzerland)

29 April International Friendly	Brazil	1–0	Austria	Rio de Janeiro, Brazil
	Rivellino 57'			Stadium: Maracanã Stadium; Attendance: 57,370; Referee: Miguel Comesaña (Argentina)

10 September International Friendly	Austria	0–1	Yugoslavia	Graz, Austria
			Bajević 41'	Stadium: Stadion Graz-Liebenau; Attendance: 12,914; Referee: Antonio Sbardella (Italy)

21 September International Friendly	Hungary	1–1	Austria	Budapest, Hungary
	Csaba 13'		Redl 29'	Stadium: Népstadion; Attendance: 15,000; Referee: Ratko Čanak (Yugoslavia)

7 October International Friendly	Austria	1–0	France	Vienna, Austria
	Kreuz 49'			Stadium: Praterstadion; Attendance: 25,000; Referee: Ferdinand Biwersi (West Germany)

31 October UEFA Euro 1972 qualifying Group 6	Austria	1–2	Italy	Vienna, Austria
	Parits 29'		De Sisti 27'; Mazzola 34'	Stadium: Praterstadion; Attendance: 54,953; Referee: Lau van Ravens (Netherlands)

== 1971 ==
4 April International Friendly	Austria	0–2	Hungary	Vienna, Austria
			Bene 70', 80'	Stadium: Praterstadion; Attendance: 33,284; Referee: Pius Kamber (Switzerland)

12 April UEFA Euro 1972 qualifying Group 6	Sweden	1–0	Austria	Stockholm, Sweden
	Olsson 62'			Stadium: Råsunda Stadium; Attendance: 5,416; Referee: Stanisław Eksztajn (Poland)

29 April UEFA Euro 1972 qualifying Group 6	Republic of Ireland	1–4	Austria	Dublin, Ireland
	Rogers 50' (pen.)		Schmidradner 4' (pen.); Kodat 11'; Dunne 30' (o.g.); Starek 72'	Stadium: Dalymount Park; Attendance: 14,674; Referee: Henry Øberg (Norway)

11 July International Friendly	Brazil	1–1	Austria	Graz, Austria
	Pelé 34'		Jara 51'	Stadium: Stadion Graz-Liebenau; Attendance: 99,902; Referee: Jack Taylor (England)

4 September UEFA Euro 1972 qualifying Group 6	Austria	1–0	Sweden	Vienna, Austria
	Stering 23'			Stadium: Praterstadion; Attendance: 38,274; Referee: Rudi Glöckner (East Germany)

10 October UEFA Euro 1972 qualifying Group 6	Austria	6–0	Republic of Ireland	Linz, Austria
	Jara 12', 85'; Pirkner 41' (pen.); Parits 45', 52', 90'			Stadium: Linzer Stadion; Attendance: 15,050; Referee: Karl Göppel (Switzerland)

320 November UEFA Euro 1972 qualifying Group 6	Italy	2–2	Austria	Rome, Italy
	Prati 10'; De Sisti 75'		Jara 36'; Sara 59'	Stadium: Stadio Olimpico; Attendance: 58,752; Referee: Gyula Emsberger (Hungary)

== 1972 ==
8 April International Friendly	Czech Republic	2–0	Austria	Brno, Czechoslovakia
	Petráš 18'; Ternény 42'			Stadium: Stadion Za Lužánkami; Attendance: 30,000; Referee: Heinz Einbeck (East Germany)

30 April 1974 FIFA World Cup qualification Group 1	Austria	4–0	Malta	Vienna, Austria
	Hickersberger 29', 34', 36'; Hof 85'			Stadium: Praterstadion; Attendance: 16,081; Referee: Karlo Kruashvili (Soviet Union)

10 June 1974 FIFA World Cup qualification Group 1	Austria	2–0	Sweden	Vienna, Austria
	Parits 65'; Pumm 83'			Stadium: Praterstadion; Attendance: 40,578; Referee: Anton Bucheli (Switzerland)

3 September International Friendly	Romania	1–1	Austria	Craiova, Romania
	Dembrovschi 43'		Hickersberger 42'	Stadium: Stadionul Centra; Attendance: 35,000; Referee: Nikola Mladenović (Yugoslavia)

15 October 1974 FIFA World Cup qualification Group 1	Austria	2–2	Hungary	Vienna, Austria
	Hasil 58' (pen.); Jara 71'		Dunai 16'; Kocsis 20'	Stadium: Praterstadion; Attendance: 67,392; Referee: Rudi Glöckner (East Germany)

25 November 1974 FIFA World Cup qualification Group 1	Malta	0–2	Austria	Gżira, Malta
			Köglberger 48'; Spiteri 77' (o.g.)	Stadium: The Stadium; Attendance: 4,373; Referee: Francesco Francescon (Italy)

== 1973 ==
28 March International Friendly	Austria	1–0	Netherlands	Vienna, Austria
	Köglberger 44'			Stadium: Praterstadion; Attendance: 40,000; Referee: Ferdinand Biwersi (West Germany)

29 April 1974 FIFA World Cup qualification Group 1	Hungary	2–2	Austria	Budapest, Hungary
	Zámbó 12'; Bálint 69'		Starek 14'; Jara 28'	Stadium: Népstadion; Attendance: 72,068; Referee: Karlo Kruashvili (Soviet Union)

23 May 1974 FIFA World Cup qualification Group 1	Sweden	3–2	Austria	Gothenburg, Sweden
	Sandberg 29', 76'; Grahn 52'		Jara 50'; Starek 88'	Stadium: Ullevi; Attendance: 48,462; Referee: Vital Loraux (Belgium)

13 June International Friendly	Austria	1–1	Brazil	Vienna, Austria
	Kreuz 5'		Jairzinho 60'	Stadium: Praterstadion; Attendance: 42,000; Referee: Michal Jursa (Czechoslovakia)

26 September International Friendly	England	7–0	Austria	London, England
	Channon 9', 47'; Clarke 28', 43'; Chivers 61'; Currie 65'; Bell 89'			Stadium: Wembley Stadium; Attendance: 48,000; Referee: Charles Corver (Netherlands)

10 October International Friendly	West Germany	4–0	Austria	Hanover, West Germany
	Müller 29', 50'; Weber 45'; Kremers 79'			Stadium: Niedersachsenstadion; Attendance: 50,000; Referee: Alfred Delcourt (Belgium)

27 November 1974 FIFA World Cup qualification Group 1 Play off	Austria	1–2	Sweden	Gelsenkirchen, West Germany
	Hattenberger 39'		Sandberg 9'; Larsson 28' (pen.)	Stadium: Parkstadion; Attendance: 69,974; Referee: Rudi Glöckner (East Germany)

== 1974 ==
27 March International Friendly	Netherlands	1–1	Austria	Rotterdam, Netherlands
	Krankl 38'		Krol 45'	Stadium: De Kuip; Attendance: 25,000; Referee: Karl Keller (Switzerland)

1 May International Friendly	Brazil	0–0	Austria	São Paulo, Brazil
				Stadium: Estádio do Morumbi; Attendance: 123,132; Referee: Pat Partridge (England)

8 June International Friendly	Austria	0–0	Italy	Vienna, Austria
				Stadium: Praterstadion; Attendance: 47,702; Referee: Alfred Delcourt (Belgium)

4 September UEFA Euro 1976 qualifying Group 2	Austria	2–1	Wales	Vienna, Austria
	Kreuz 63'; Krankl 74'		Griffiths 35'	Stadium: Praterstadion; Attendance: 30,795; Referee: Doğan Babacan (Turkey)

26 September International Friendly	Austria	1–0	Hungary	Vienna, Austria
	Krankl 16'			Stadium: Praterstadion; Attendance: 36,000; Referee: Walter Hungerbühler (Switzerland)

13 November International Friendly	Turkey	0–1	Austria	Istanbul, Turkey
			Stering 4'	Stadium: İnönü Stadium; Attendance: 30,978; Referee: Nicolae Petriceanu (Romania)

== 1975 ==
16 March UEFA Euro 1976 qualifying Group 2	Luxembourg	1–2	Austria	Luxembourg City, Luxembourg
	Braun 12'		Köglberger 58'; Krankl 75'	Stadium: Stade Josy Barthel; Attendance: 5,340; Referee: Leo van der Kroft (Netherlands)

2 April UEFA Euro 1976 qualifying Group 2	Austria	0–0	Hungary	Vienna, Austria
				Stadium: Praterstadion; Attendance: 65,674; Referee: Jack Taylor (England)

7 June International Friendly	Austria	0–0	Czech Republic	Vienna, Austria
				Stadium: Praterstadion; Attendance: 26,000; Referee: Rudolf Frickel (West Germany)

3 September International Friendly	Austria	0–2	West Germany	Vienna, Austria
			Beer 50', 79'	Stadium: Praterstadion; Attendance: 72,100; Referee: Károly Palotai (Hungary)

24 September UEFA Euro 1976 qualifying Group 2	Hungary	2–1	Austria	Budapest, Hungary
	Nyilasi 3'; Pusztai 35'		Krankl 16' (pen.)	Stadium: Népstadion; Attendance: 31,270; Referee: René Vigliani (France)

15 October UEFA Euro 1976 qualifying Group 2	Austria	6–2	Luxembourg	Vienna, Austria
	Welzl 1', 46'; Krankl 38', 76'; Jara 41'; Prohaska 80'		Braun 4'; Philipp 32'	Stadium: Praterstadion; Attendance: 14,499; Referee: Miroslav Kopal (Czechoslovakia)

19 November UEFA Euro 1976 qualifying Group 2	Wales	1–0	Austria	Wrexham, Wales
	Griffiths 69'			Stadium: Racecourse Ground; Attendance: 27,578; Referee: Sergio Gonella (Italy)

== 1976 ==
28 April International Friendly	Austria	1–0	Sweden	Vienna, Austria
	Pirkner 50'			Stadium: Praterstadion; Attendance: 35,000; Referee: Sándor Petri (Hungary)

12 June International Friendly	Hungary	2–0	Austria	Budapest, Hungary
	Magyar 35'; Várady 76' (pen.)		Pirkner (red card) 70'	Stadium: Népstadion; Attendance: 20,000; Referee: Jack Taylor (England)

23 June International Friendly	Austria	1–2	Soviet Union	Vienna, Austria
	Rinker 29'		Minayev 7', 36'	Stadium: Praterstadion; Attendance: 16,000; Referee: Francis Rion (Belgium)

22 September International Friendly	Austria	3–1	Switzerland	Linz, Austria
	Krankl 50'; Köglberger 52'; Kreuz 89' (pen.)		Trinchero 60' (pen.)	Stadium: Linzer Stadion; Attendance: 22,000; Referee: Adolf Prokop (East Germany)

13 October International Friendly	Austria	2–4	Hungary	Vienna, Austria
	Krankl 16' (pen.), 51'		Nyilasi 3', 7'; Kereki 53', 65'	Stadium: Praterstadion; Attendance: 38,000; Referee: Jan Keizer (Netherlands)

10 November International Friendly	Greece	0–3	Austria	Kavala, Greece
			Hickersberger 11'; Krankl 62'; Pezzey 86'	Stadium: Anthi Karagianni Stadium; Attendance: 7,589; Referee: Atanas Mateyev (Bulgaria)

5 December 1978 FIFA World Cup qualification Group 3	Malta	0–1	Austria	Gżira, Malta
			Krankl 57'	Stadium: The Stadium; Attendance: 7,368; Referee: Hédi Saoudi (Tunisia)

15 December International Friendly	Israel	1–3	Austria	Ramat Gan, Israel
	Peretz 25'		Prohaska 37'; Schachner 38'; Krankl 55'	Stadium: Ramat Gan Stadium; Attendance: 8,000; Referee: Shimon Shogeg (Israel)

== 1977 ==
9 March International Friendly	Austria	2–0	Greece	Vienna, Austria
	Sara 32'; Schachner 54'			Stadium: Praterstadion; Attendance: 25,000; Referee: Josef Pouček (Czechoslovakia)

17 April 1978 FIFA World Cup qualification Group 3	Austria	1–0	Turkey	Vienna, Austria
	Schachner 42'			Stadium: Praterstadion; Attendance: 60,100; Referee: Viktor Zharkov (Soviet Union)

30 April 1978 FIFA World Cup qualification Group 3	Austria	9–0	Malta	Salzburg, Austria
	Krankl 8', 12', 17', 19', 54', 67'; Stering 29', 69'; Pirkner 65'		Farrugia (red card) 67'	Stadium: Stadion Lehen; Attendance: 17,000; Referee: Alojzy Jarguz (Poland)

1 June International Friendly	Czech Republic	0–0	Austria	Ostrava, Czechoslovakia
				Stadium: Bazaly; Attendance: 15,000; Referee: Pablo Sánchez Ibáñez (Spain)

24 August International Friendly	Austria	2–1	Poland	Vienna, Austria
	Stering 15'; Krankl 71'		Kmiecik 71'	Stadium: Praterstadion; Attendance: 28,500; Referee: Marcel Van Langenhove (Belgium)

24 September 1978 FIFA World Cup qualification Group 3	Austria	1–1	East Germany	Vienna, Austria
	Kreuz 8'		Hoffmann 40'	Stadium: Praterstadion; Attendance: 72,000; Referee: Thomas Reynolds (Wales)

30 October 1978 FIFA World Cup qualification Group 3	Turkey	0–1	Austria	İzmir, Turkey
			Prohaska 71'	Stadium: İzmir Atatürk Stadium; Attendance: 69,360; Referee: John Gordon (Scotland)

== 1978 ==
15 February International Friendly	Greece	1–1	Austria	Athens, Greece
	Galakos 40'		Krankl 59'	Stadium: Nikos Goumas Stadium; Attendance: 11,297; Referee: Domenico Serafino (Italy)

22 March International Friendly	Belgium	1–0	Austria	Charleroi, Belgium
	Geurts 42'			Stadium: Stade du Mambourg; Attendance: 3,034; Referee: Jan Keizer (Netherlands)

4 April 1978 FIFA World Cup qualification Group 3	Switzerland	0–1	Austria	Basel, Switzerland
			Jara 4'	Stadium: St. Jakob Stadium; Attendance: 13,000; Referee: Riccardo Lattanzi (Italy)

20 May International Friendly	Austria	0–1	Netherlands	Vienna, Austria
			Haan 55'	Stadium: Praterstadion; Attendance: 61,000; Referee: Jaromír Fausek (Czechoslovakia)

3 June 1978 FIFA World Cup Group 3	Austria	2–1	Spain	Buenos Aires, Argentina
	Schachner 10'; Krankl 77'		Dani 21'	Stadium: José Amalfitani Stadium; Attendance: 40,841; Referee: Károly Palotai (Hungary)

7 June 1978 FIFA World Cup Group 3	Austria	1–0	Sweden	Buenos Aires, Argentina
	Krankl 43' (pen.)			Stadium: José Amalfitani Stadium; Attendance: 41,424; Referee: Charles Corver (Netherlands)

11 June 1978 FIFA World Cup Group 3	Austria	0–1	Brazil	Buenos Aires, Argentina
			Roberto 40'	Stadium: José Amalfitani Stadium; Attendance: 35,221; Referee: Robert Wurtz (France)

11 June 1978 FIFA World Cup Group Second Round; Group A	Austria	1–5	Netherlands	Córdoba, Argentina
	Obermayer 79'		Brandts 6'; Rensenbrink 36' (pen.); Rep 37', 53'; W. van de Kerkhof 82'	Stadium: Estadio Chateau Carreras; Attendance: 25,050; Referee: John Gordon (Scotland)

18 June 1978 FIFA World Cup Group Second Round; Group A	Austria	0–1	Italy	Buenos Aires, Argentina
			Rossi 13'	Stadium: Estadio Monumental Antonio Vespucio Liberti; Attendance: 66,695; Referee: Francis Rion (Belgium)

21 June 1978 FIFA World Cup Group Second Round; Group A	Austria	3–2	West Germany	Córdoba, Argentina
	Vogts 59' (o.g.); Krankl 66', 87'		Rummenigge 19'; Hölzenbein 67'	Stadium: Estadio Chateau Carreras; Attendance: 38,318; Referee: Abraham Klein (Israel)

30 August UEFA Euro 1980 qualifying Group 2	Norway	0–2	Austria	Oslo, Norway
			Pezzey 25'; Krankl 43'	Stadium: Ullevaal Stadion; Attendance: 13,075; Referee: Pat Partridge (England)

20 September UEFA Euro 1980 qualifying Group 2	Austria	3–2	Scotland	Vienna, Austria
	Pezzey 26'; Schachner 48'; Kreuz 62'		McQueen 63'; Gray 77'	Stadium: Praterstadion; Attendance: 62,281; Referee: Alberto Michelotti (Italy)

15 November UEFA Euro 1980 qualifying Group 2	Austria	1–2	Portugal	Vienna, Austria
	Schachner 71'		Nené 29'; Fonseca 90+1'	Stadium: Praterstadion; Attendance: 64,024; Referee: Nicolae Rainea (Romania)

== 1979 ==
30 January International Friendly	Israel	0–1	Austria	Tel Aviv, Israel
			Oberacher 55'	Stadium: Bloomfield Stadium; Attendance: 6,000; Referee: Porém Luís (Portugal)

28 March UEFA Euro 1980 qualifying Group 2	Belgium	1–1	Austria	Brussels, Belgium
	Vandereycken 21' (pen.)		Krankl 61'	Stadium: Émile Versé Stadium; Attendance: 6,264; Referee: Angel Franco Martínez (Spain)

2 May UEFA Euro 1980 qualifying Group 2	Austria	0–0	Belgium	Vienna, Austria
				Stadium: Praterstadion; Attendance: 42,903; Referee: Hilmi Ok (Turkey)

13 June International Friendly	Austria	4–3	England	Vienna, Austria
	Pezzey 19', 70'; Welzl 26', 41'		Keegan 27'; Coppell 37'; Wilkins 64'	Stadium: Praterstadion; Attendance: 60,000; Referee: Alexis Ponnet (Belgium)

29 August UEFA Euro 1980 qualifying Group 2	Austria	4–0	Norway	Vienna, Austria
	Jara 42'; Prohaska 46' (pen.); Kreuz 76'; Krankl 86'			Stadium: Praterstadion; Attendance: 30,991; Referee: Jaromír Fausek (Czechoslovakia)

26 September International Friendly	Austria	3–1	Hungary	Vienna, Austria
	Prohaska 17' (pen.), 58' (pen.); Steinkogler 76'		Fekete 74'	Stadium: Praterstadion; Attendance: 50,000; Referee: Abraham Klein (Israel)

17 October UEFA Euro 1980 qualifying Group 2	Scotland	1–1	Austria	Glasgow, Scotland
	Gemmill 75'		Krankl 40'	Stadium: Hampden Park; Attendance: 67,895; Referee: Károly Palotai (Hungary)

21 November UEFA Euro 1980 qualifying Group 2	Portugal	1–2	Austria	Lisbon, Portugal
	Reinaldo 42'		Welzl 36'; Schachner 51'	Stadium: Estádio da Luz; Attendance: 52,815; Referee: Charles Corver (Netherlands)

== Appearances and goals ==
Name	Club(s)	Total	
Name	Club(s)	Apps	Goals
Ernst Kaltenbrunner	Wiener AC	1	1
Helmut Kitzmüller	Linzer ASK	1	0
Adolf Knoll	Wiener AC; Wiener Sport-Club	15	0
Karl Koller	First Vienna FC	35	1
Giuseppe Koschier	Admira Energie	2	0
Paul Kozlicek	Linzer ASK	5	0
Leopold Barschandt	Wiener Sport-Club	1	0
Horst Nemec	FK Austria Wien	26	14
Rudolf Oslansky	Wiener Sport-Club	6	1
Roman Pichler	Wiener AC; SK Rapid Wien	11	0
Rudolf Pichler	1. Wiener Neustädter SC	1	0
Erich Probst	Austria Salzburg	1	1
Josef Bertalan	SK Rapid Wien	1	0
Kurt Schmied	First Vienna FC	5	0
Helmut Senekowitsch	First Vienna FC; Real Betis; FC Wacker Innsbruck	9	2
Karl Skerlan	Wiener Sport-Club; Admira Energie	8	0
Walter Skocik	SK Rapid Wien	14	0
Karl Stotz	FK Austria Wien	13	0
Erich Strobl	1. Simmeringer SC; FK Austria Wien	5	0
Franz Swoboda	FK Austria Wien	5	0
Rudi Szanwald	Wiener Sport-Club	8	0
Heribert Trubrig	Linzer ASK	10	0
Johann Windisch	Wiener Sport-Club	9	0
Ferdinand Zechmeister	Linzer ASK	1	0
Walter Zeman	SK Rapid Wien	1	0
Hans Buzek	First Vienna FC; FK Austria Wien; Wiener Sport-Club	25	3
Rudolf Flögel	SK Rapid Wien	40	6
Walter Glechner	SK Rapid Wien	35	1
Karl Giesser	SK Rapid Wien	2	0
Josef Hamerl	Wiener Sport-Club	5	1
Gerhard Hanappi	SK Rapid Wien	15	2
Erich Hasenkopf	Wiener Sport-Club	24	0
Erich Hof	Wiener Sport-Club	28	21
Walter Horak	SC Wacker	2	0
Wilhelm Huberts	Grazer AK; SK Sturm Graz	4	0
Friedrich Rafreider	FC Dornbirn 1913	14	2
Gernot Fraydl	FK Austria Wien; Grazer AK; FC Wacker Innsbruck; Hertha BSC; 1860 Munich	27	0
Wilhelm Kainrath	Wiener Sport-Club	2	0
Günter Kaltenbrunner	Admira Energie; SK Rapid Wien	4	0
Oskar Kohlhauser	SVS Linz	2	0
Johann Löser	FK Austria Wien	1	0
Heinz Oberparleiter	Linzer ASK	1	0
Ernst Ocwirk	FK Austria Wien	1	0
Ignaz Puschnik	Kapfenberger SV	6	0
Rudolf Sabetzer	Linzer ASK	2	0
Walter Schleger	FK Austria Wien	1	0
Franz Viehböck	SVS Linz; Linzer ASK	18	2
Ewald Wieger	First Vienna FC	1	0
Franz Wolny	SK Rapid Wien; FC Wacker Innsbruck	8	2
Ernst Fiala	FK Austria Wien	15	0
Alfred Gager	FK Austria Wien	6	0
Johann Geyer	FK Austria Wien	9	0
Paul Halla	SK Rapid Wien	8	0
Horst Hirnschrodt	FK Austria Wien	19	1
Ferdinand Kolarik	Admira Energie	2	0
Walter Koleznik	Grazer AK	6	1
Toni Linhart	Wiener Sport-Club	6	1
Alfred Schrottenbaum	SK Rapid Wien	1	0
Peter Vargo	FK Austria Wien	2	0
Johann Frank	SV Schwechat; FK Austria Wien	7	0
Franz Hasil	SK Rapid Wien; FC Schalke 04; Feyenoord; Austria Klagenfurt	24	3
Johann Hörmayer	Wiener Sport-Club	7	0
Johannes Jank	Grazer AK	1	0
Walter Ludescher	FC Wacker Innsbruck	7	0
Günther Paulitsch	SK Sturm Graz	1	0
Heinz Binder	FK Austria Wien	8	0
Leopold Grausam	SK Rapid Wien	8	3
Walter Hiesel	First Vienna FC; FK Austria Wien	2	0
Helmut Köglberger	Linzer ASK; FK Austria Wien	28	6
Friedrich Kremser	First Vienna FC	4	0
Adolf Macek	Austria Salzburg	4	0
Peter Pumm	FC Wacker Innsbruck; FC Bayern Munich; DSV Alpine	19	1
Robert Sara	FK Austria Wien	54	3
Walter Seitl	SK Rapid Wien	6	2
Walter Stamm	Admira Energie	7	0
Gerhard Sturmberger	Linzer ASK	43	0
Ewald Ullmann	SK Rapid Wien	6	0
Rudolf Ceyka	First Vienna FC	1	0
Alfons Dirnberger	FK Austria Wien	3	0
Toni Fritsch	SK Rapid Wien	9	2
Thomas Parits	FK Austria Wien; 1. FC Köln; Eintracht Frankfurt	27	5
Peter Schmidt	Wiener Sport-Club	2	0
Johann Szauer	Admira Energie	2	0
Josef Wahl	Admira Energie	1	0
Michael Breibert	Admira Energie	2	0
Karl Fröhlich	FK Austria Wien	15	0
Walter Gebhardt	SK Rapid Wien	17	0
Helmut Metzler	SC Bregenz	6	0
Helmut Redl	FC Wacker Innsbruck; SV Wattens; SK Rapid Wien	19	7
Helmut Siber	FC Wacker Innsbruck; Kickers Offenbach	11	4
Helmut Wartusch	FC Wacker Innsbruck	2	0
Johann Eigenstiller	FC Wacker Innsbruck; SK Rapid Wien	37	0
Roland Eschelmüller	FC Wacker Innsbruck	2	0
Erich Fak	SK Rapid Wien	13	0
Gerald Fuchsbichler	SK Rapid Wien; Wiener Sport-Club	6	0
Wilhelm Harreither	Linzer ASK	25	0
Gerfried Hodschar	Grazer AK	2	0
Heinz Russ	SK Sturm Graz	2	0
August Starek	FC Bayern Munich; 1. FC Nürnberg; SK Rapid Wien; Linzer ASK	22	4
Johann Ettmayer	FC Wacker Innsbruck; VfB Stuttgart; Hamburger SV	30	0
Josef Hickersberger	FK Austria Wien; Kickers Offenbach; Fortuna Düsseldorf	39	5
Norbert Hof	Wiener Sport-Club; Hamburger SV; SK Rapid Wien	31	1
Rudolf Horvath	Austria Salzburg; SK VÖEST Linz; FC Wacker Innsbruck	16	0
Robert Kaiser	SK Sturm Graz	1	0
Wilhelm Kreuz	Admira Energie; Sparta Rotterdam; Feyenoord; SK VÖEST Linz	52	10
Hans Pirkner	FC Schalke 04; DSV Alpine; FK Austria Wien	20	4
Hans Schmidradner	Wiener Sport-Club; Kickers Offenbach	28	1
Josef Stering	Grazer AK; SK VÖEST Linz; FC Wacker Innsbruck	26	5
Heinrich Strasser	Admira Energie	26	0
Helmut Wallner	Wiener Sport-Club	3	0
Alfred Eisele	SC Eisenstadt	2	0
Friedl Koncilia	WSG Wattens; FC Wacker Innsbruck; R.S.C. Anderlecht	52	0
Eduard Krieger	FK Austria Wien; Club Brugge KV	25	0
Herbert Rettensteiner	FC Wacker Innsbruck; SK VÖEST Linz	15	0
Peter Clement	Wiener Sport-Club	2	0
Johannes Demantke	Admira Energie	4	0
Karl Kodat	Austria Salzburg; Royal Antwerp F.C.	5	1
Werner Kriess	FC Wacker Innsbruck	15	0
Kurt Leitner	Linzer ASK	1	0
Rainer Schlagbauer	First Vienna FC; SK Rapid Wien	2	0
Geza Gallos	SK Rapid Wien; Linzer ASK	6	0
Alfred Gassner	First Vienna FC; FC Admira/Wacker	3	0
Adolf Antrich	SK Rapid Wien	2	0
Alois Jagodic	SK Rapid Wien	2	0
Kurt Jara	FC Wacker Innsbruck; Valencia CF; MSV Duisburg	41	10
Herbert Stachowicz	FC Admira/Wacker	4	0
Karl Daxbacher	FK Austria Wien	6	0
Robert Fendler	SK VÖEST Linz	1	0
Roland Hattenberger	FC Wacker Innsbruck; Kickers Offenbach; SC Fortuna Köln; VfB Stuttgart	31	2
Hans Krankl	SK Rapid Wien; FC Barcelona	48	29
Heinz Schilcher	AFC Ajax	1	0
Manfred Gombasch	FC Wacker Innsbruck	4	0
Franz Bacher	Austria Salzburg	1	0
Herwig Kircher	SK VÖEST Linz	2	0
Helmut Maurer	SK Rapid Wien	1	0
Egon Pajenk	SK Rapid Wien	3	0
Herbert Prohaska	FK Austria Wien	43	6
Werner Walzer	SK Rapid Wien	1	0
Hannes Winklbauer	Austria Salzburg	7	0
Peter Koncilia	FC Wacker Innsbruck	6	0
Erich Obermayer	FK Austria Wien	25	1
Bruno Pezzey	FC Wacker Innsbruck; Eintracht Frankfurt	41	5
Alfred Riedl	Royal Antwerp F.C. Standard Liège	4	0
Günther Rinker	FC Wacker Innsbruck	2	1
Manfred Steiner	SK Sturm Graz	2	0
Helmut Weigl	FC Admira/Wacker	1	0
Kurt Welzl	FC Wacker Innsbruck; AZ Alkmaar	8	5
Franz Oberacher	FC Wacker Innsbruck	6	1
Herbert Oberhofer	FC Admira/Wacker	6	0
Peter Persidis	SK Rapid Wien	7	0
Andy Pichler	SK Sturm Graz	1	0
Walter Schachner	DSV Alpine; FK Austria Wien	20	7
Werner Schwarz	FC Wacker Innsbruck	3	0
Heribert Weber	SK Sturm Graz; SK Rapid Wien	17	0
Gerhard Breitenberger	SK VÖEST Linz	15	0
Wilhelm Cerny	FC Admira/Wacker	2	0
Gerhard Fleischmann	FC Admira/Wacker	1	0
Gerald Haider	Austria Salzburg	1	0
Peter Meister	First Vienna FC; SK Rapid Wien	1	0
Werner Zanon	FC Wacker Innsbruck	1	0
Ernst Baumeister	FK Austria Wien	7	0
Hubert Baumgartner	FK Austria Wien	1	0
Erwin Fuchsbichler	SK VÖEST Linz	4	0
Felix Gasselich	FK Austria Wien	3	0
Günther Happich	Wiener Sport-Club	5	0
Reinhold Hintermaier	SK VÖEST Linz; 1. FC Nürnberg	3	0
Hans-Dieter Mirnegg	SK VÖEST Linz; MSV Duisburg	5	0
Günther Pospischil	FK Austria Wien	2	0
Josef Sara	FK Austria Wien	1	0
Gerhard Steinkogler	Grazer AK	2	1
Max Hagmayr	SK VÖEST Linz	1	0
Gernot Jurtin	SK Sturm Graz	1	0
