= List of Austria international footballers =

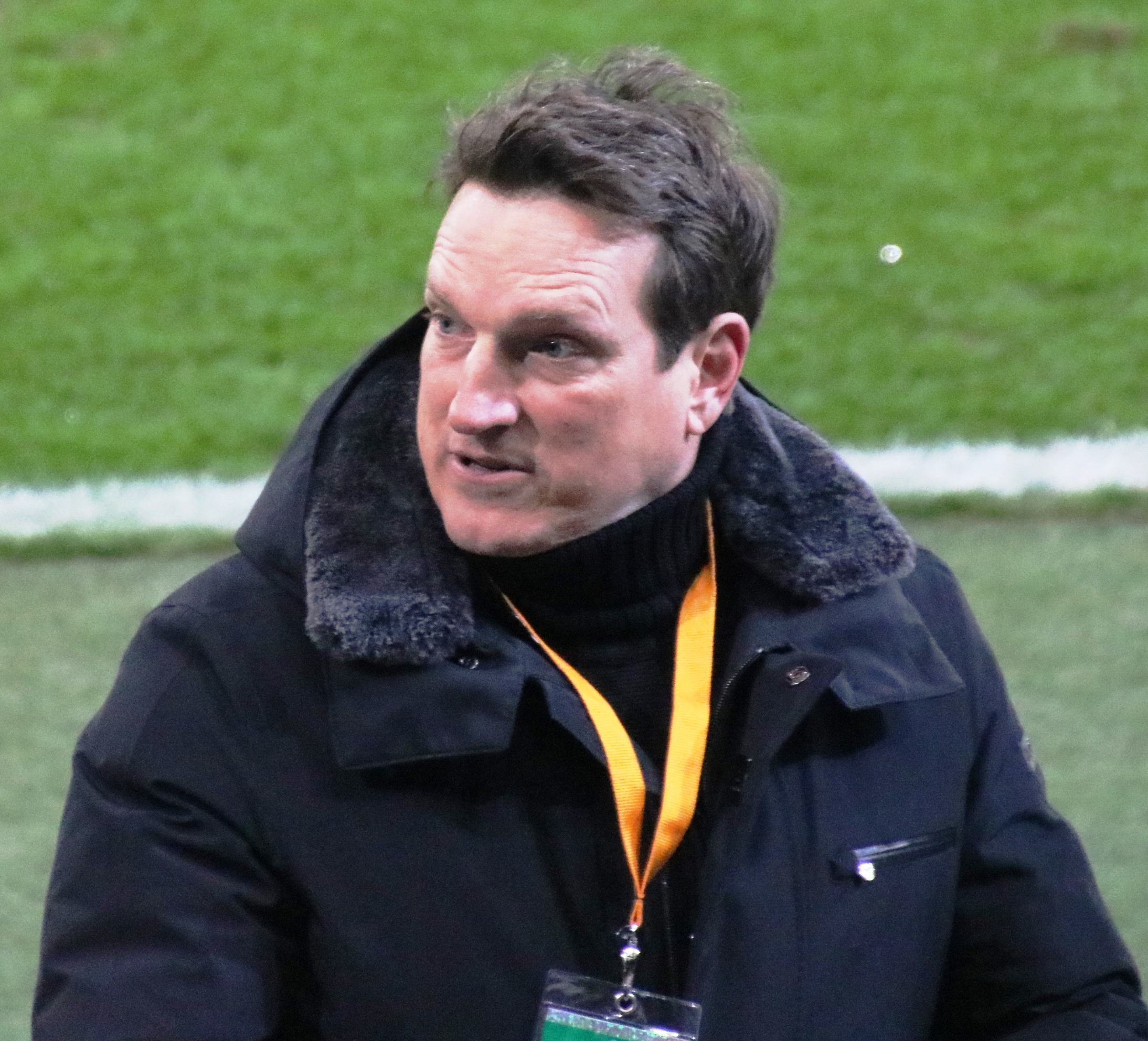
Andi Herzog is Austria's most capped player of all time.

The Austria national football team has represented Austria in international association football since 1902. Austria played its first international match on 12 October 1902, defeating neighbouring Hungary 5–0 in a friendly. The team is governed by the Austrian Football Association (German: Österreichischer Fußball-Bund; ÖFB) and competes as a member of the Union of European Football Associations (UEFA), which encompasses the countries of Europe and Israel. As of November 2020, Austria has played a total of 791 international matches, winning 331, drawing 170 and losing 290. Austria have played Hungary most frequently, meeting the side 137 times. Of these, Austria have won 40, drawn 30 and lost 67. The Austria–Hungary football rivalry is the second-most played international fixture in football history, behind only the Argentina–Uruguay rivalry which has been played officially 194 times.

Andi Herzog is Austria's most capped player with 103 caps. He made his international debut on 6 April 1988 in a 2–2 draw with Greece and equalled Toni Polster's caps record on 17 April 2002 by winning his 95th cap. He surpassed Polster one month later in his next appearance and went on to finish his career with 103 caps, having become the only Austrian to win more than 100 caps. Polster remains Austria's highest goalscorer with 44 goals, including three hat-tricks and six braces.

Jan Studnicka, who scored a hat-trick in Austria's first international fixture, was the first player to amass 25 caps for the side. He achieved the tally in November 1917 but attained only three more caps for the national side during his career. Alexander Popovic set a new caps record in April 1921 by winning his 29th cap before Josef Brandstätter claimed the record a year later. Josef Blum equalled Brandstätter's record in 1929 but did not surpass him for nearly two years before becoming the new record holder when he won his next cap. He finished his career with 51 caps, becoming the first player to reach 50 appearances for the national side. Ernst Ocwirk held the caps record between 1954 and 1957 before Gerhard Hanappi became the record holder after his 62nd appearance. Hanappi's first 55 caps had been won in a consecutive spell of fixtures between November 1948 and May 1956. His final tally of 93 appearances stood for more than 40 years until Polster overtook the record during the group stage of the 1998 FIFA World Cup. Having equalled Hanappi's record in Austria's second group game against Chile, he won his 94th cap in his side's final group match with Italy. Polster appeared only once more for Austria after the tournament, retiring with 95 caps.

Studnicka also held the goalscoring record for the national side from the team's first match until 1929, although Ferdinand Swatosch did equal his tally of 18 in 1925. Johann Horvath overtook the pair with a brace against Italy. Horvath and Anton Schall competed for the record for several years as part of Austria's "Wunderteam"; Schall surpassed Horvath in 1933 before Horvath reclaimed the record the following year. Schall tied the new record a week later with his final international goal, but Horvath went on to score two more goals before retiring to finish his career with 29 goals. Horvath's record stood for 46 years until Hans Krankl scored his 30th international goal in November 1980, going on to finish his career with 34 goals. Krankl's total included six goals during a 9–0 victory over Malta in 1977, the most goals scored in a single international match by an Austrian player. The current record holder, Toni Polster, surpassed Krankl in 1996 and eventually ended his career with 44 international goals.

== Players ==
Appearances and goals are composed of FIFA World Cup and UEFA European Championships, and each competition's required qualification matches, as well as UEFA Nations League matches and numerous international friendly tournaments and matches. Players are listed by number of caps. If the number of caps is equal, the players are then listed alphabetically. Statistics updated following match played on 17 November 2026.

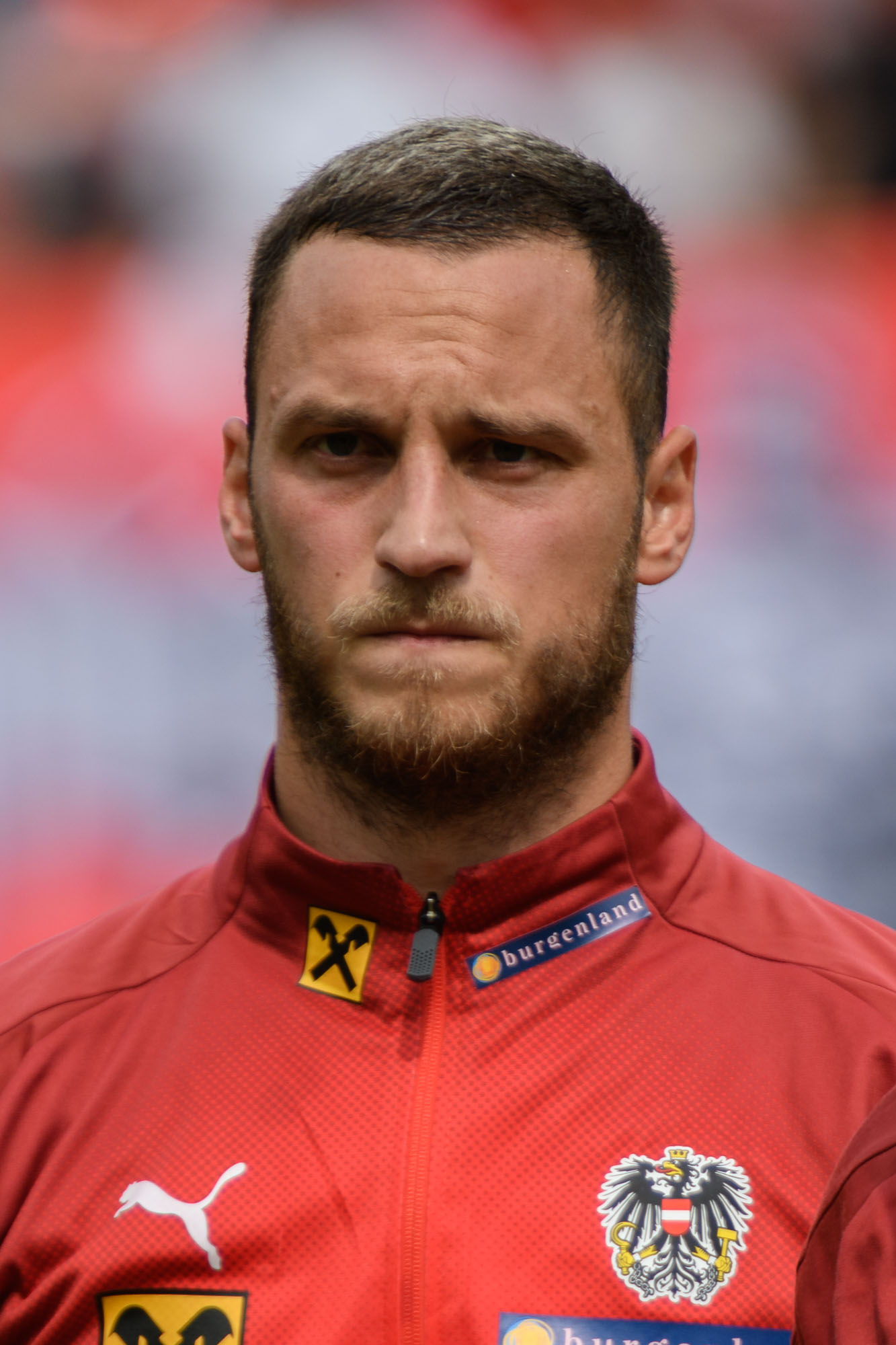
Marko Arnautović is the most capped player and also the nation's top scorer.

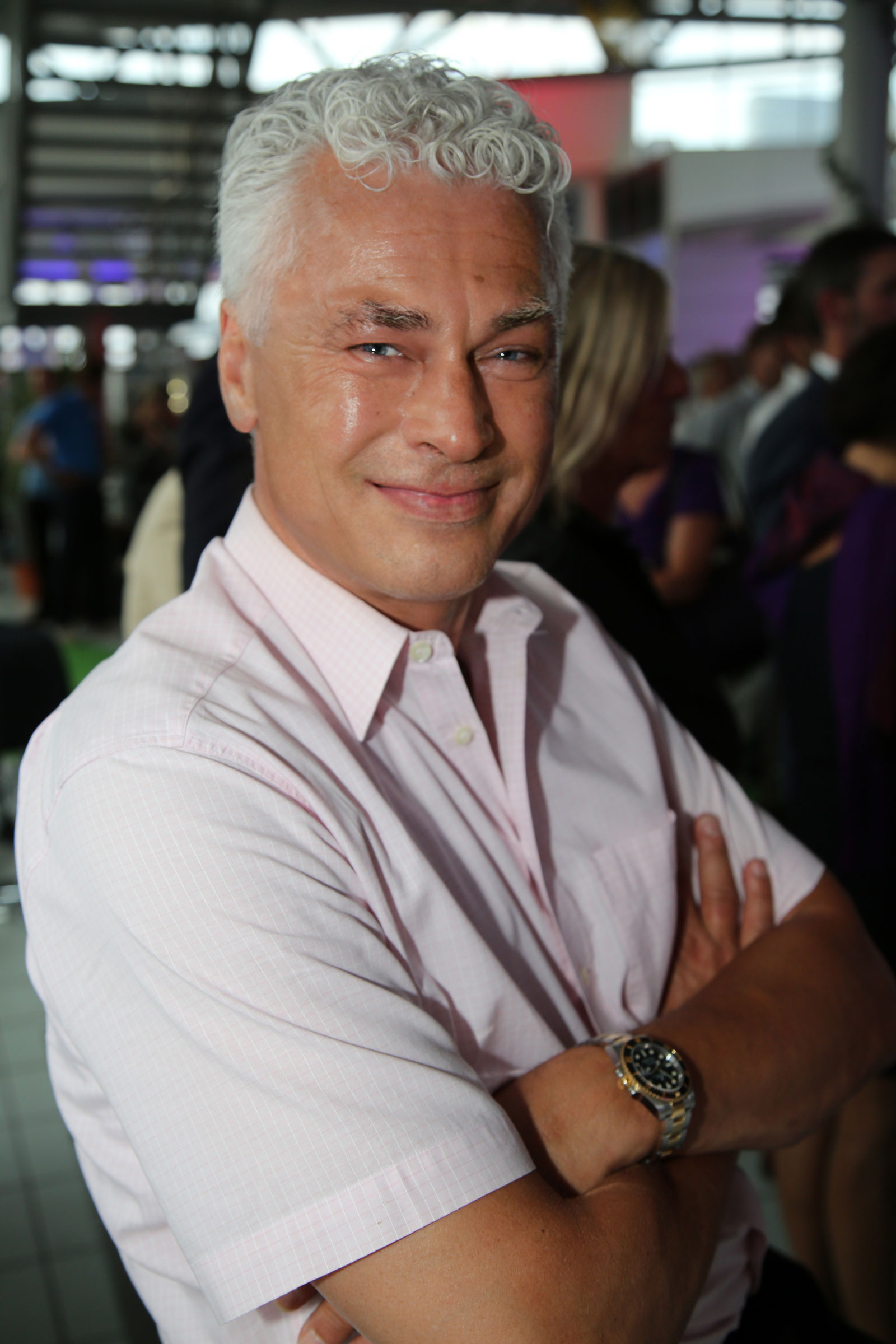
Toni Polster held Austria's caps record between 1998 and 2002 and was the nation's leading goalscorer until 2025; 95 caps.

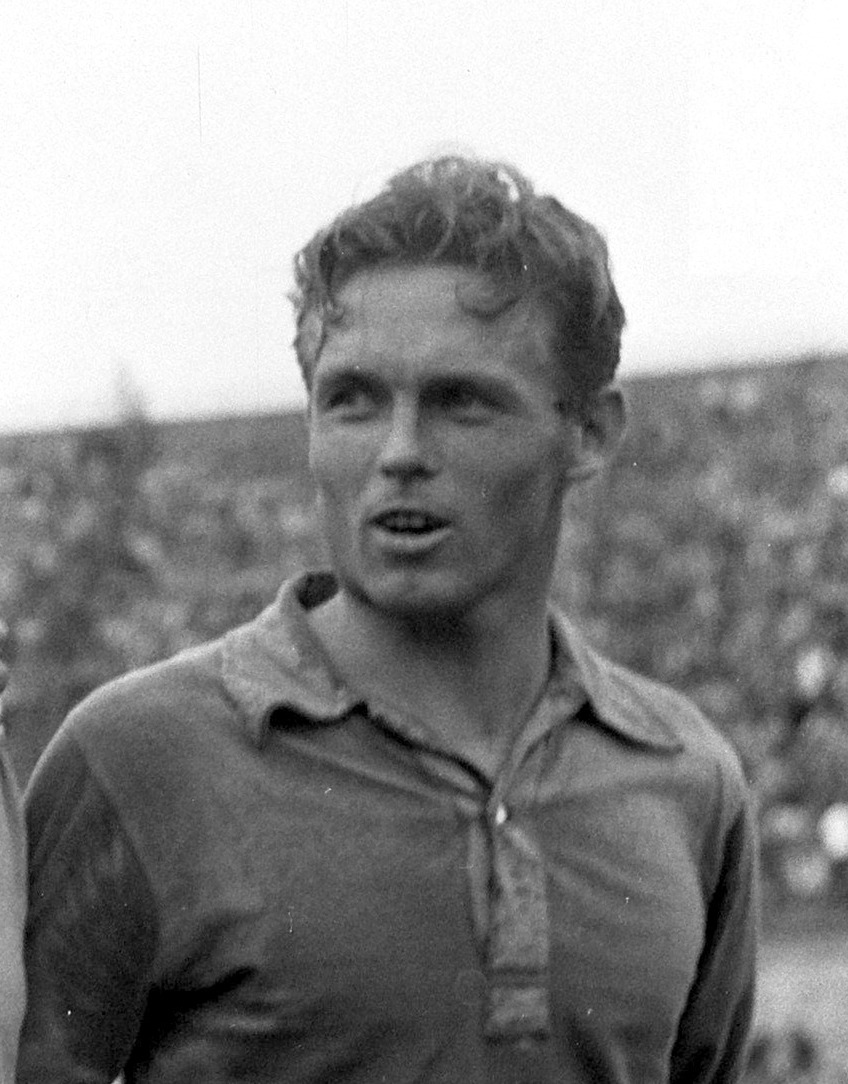
Gerhard Hanappi was Austria's record appearance holder for more than 40 years.

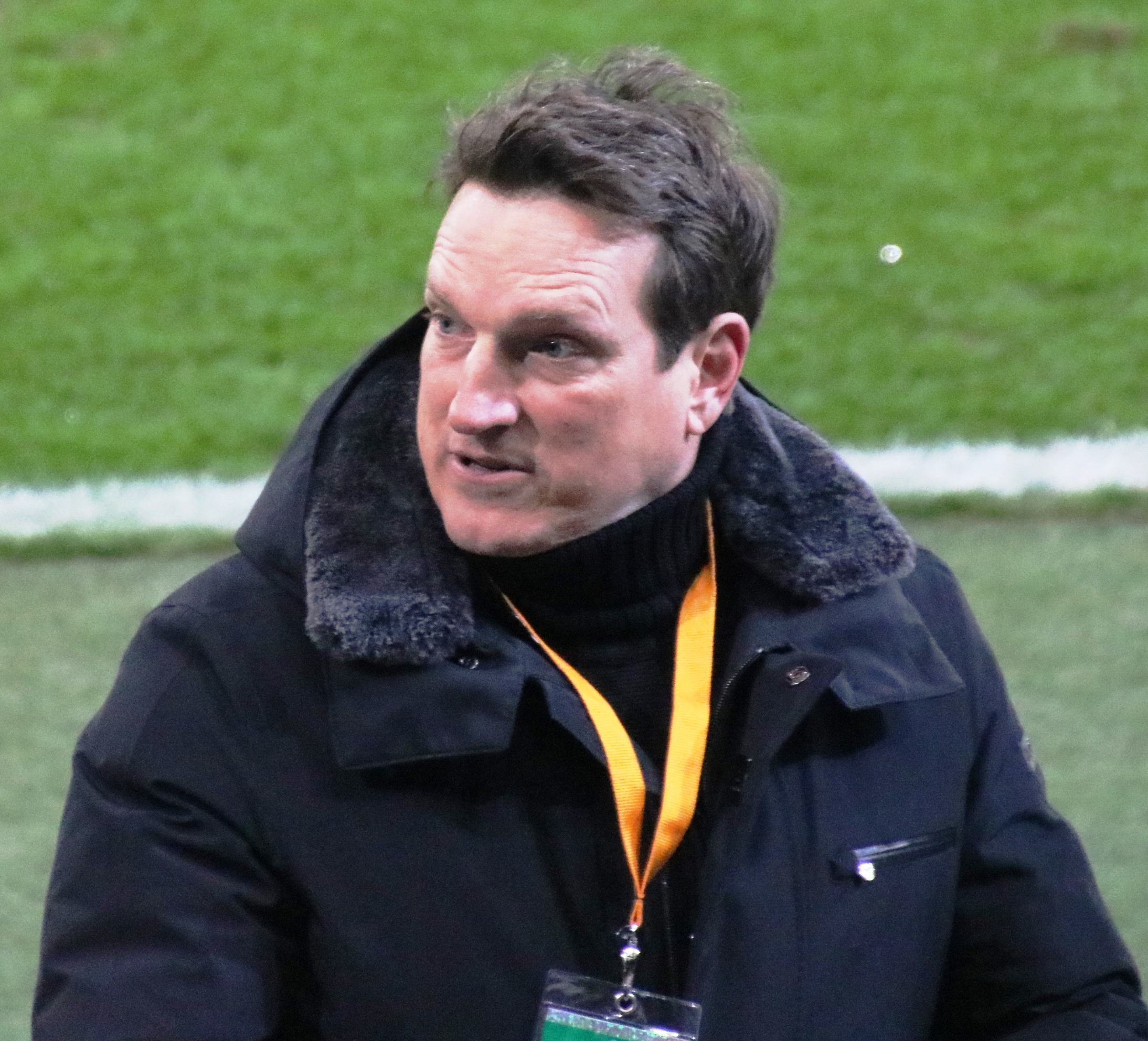
Andi Herzog, 103 caps.

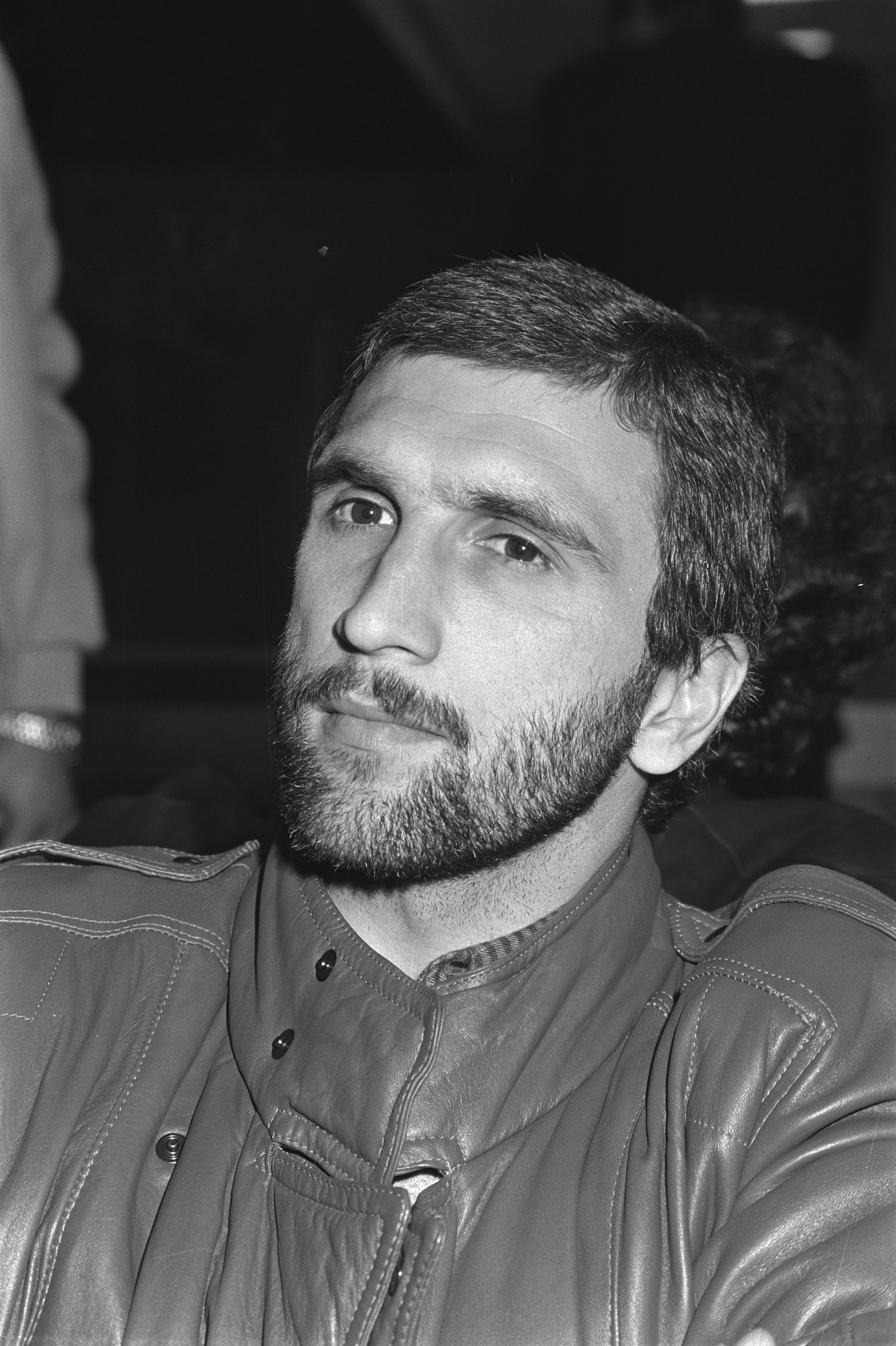
Hans Krankl held the national team goalscoring record between 1980 and 1996.

	Key
*	Still active for the national team (Note: Players who are still active for the national team are players who have not retired from international football and are, subsequently, eligible to be called up.)
=	Player is tied for the number of caps
GK	Goalkeeper
DF	Defender
MF	Midfielder
FW	Forward

Austria national team footballers with at least 25 appearances
No.	Name	Position	National career	Caps	Goals	Notes
1	Marko Arnautović	FW	2008–2026	137	49	
2	David Alaba*	DF	2009–2026	117	15	
3	Andi Herzog	MF	1988–2003	103	26	
4	Marcel Sabitzer*	DF	2012–2026	102	27	
5	Aleksandar Dragović	DF	2009–2022	100	2	
6	Toni Polster	FW	1982–2000	95	44	
7	Gerhard Hanappi	MF	1948–1962	93	12	
8	Karl Koller	MF	1952–1965	86	5	
9=	Julian Baumgartlinger	MF	2009–2021	84	1	
9=	Friedrich Koncilia	GK	1974–1985	84	0	
9=	Bruno Pezzey	MF	1975–1990	84	9	
12=	Michael Gregoritsch*	FW	2016–2026	83	25	
12=	Herbert Prohaska	MF	1974–1989	83	10	
14	Christian Fuchs	DF	2006–2016	78	1	
15	Sebastian Prödl	DF	2007–2018	73	4	
16	Marc Janko	FW	2006–2019	70	28	
17=	Andreas Ivanschitz	MF	2003–2014	69	12	
17=	Hans Krankl	FW	1973–1985	69	34	
19=	Martin Harnik	FW	2007–2017	68	15	
19=	Heribert Weber	DF	1976–1989	68	1	
21=	Konrad Laimer*	MF	2019–2026	65	7	
21=	Peter Stöger	MF	1988–1999	65	15	
23	Walter Schachner	FW	1976–1994	64	23	
24=	Andreas Ogris	FW	1986–1997	63	11	
24=	Anton Pfeffer	DF	1988–1999	63	1	
24=	Peter Schöttel	DF	1988–2002	63	0	
27	Ernst Ocwirk	MF	1945–1962	62	6	
28=	Florian Grillitsch*	MF	2017–2026	61	1	
28=	Stefan Ilsanker	MF	2014–2022	61	0	
28=	Emanuel Pogatetz	DF	2002–2014	61	2	
28=	Stefan Posch*	DF	2019–2026	61	5	
32	Christoph Baumgartner*	MF	2020–2026	60	19	
33=	Kurt Jara	MF	1971–1985	59	14	
33=	Xaver Schlager*	MF	2018–2026	59	4	
33=	Franz Wohlfahrt	GK	1987–2001	59	0	
36	René Aufhauser	MF	2002–2008	58	12	
37	Nicolas Seiwald*	MF	2021–2026	57	1	
38=	Wilhelm Kreuz	FW	1969–1981	56	10	
38=	Markus Schopp	MF	1995–2005	56	6	
38=	Martin Stranzl	DF	2000–2009	56	3	
41=	Peter Artner	DF	1987–1996	55	1	
41=	Zlatko Junuzović	MF	2006–2017	55	7	
41=	Dietmar Kühbauer	MF	1992–2005	55	5	
41=	Robert Sara	DF	1965–1980	55	3	
45	Martin Hinteregger	DF	2013–2021	53	4	
46=	Josef Blum	DF	1920–1932	51	3	
46=	Ernst Happel	DF	1947–1958	51	5	
46=	Roland Hattenberger	MF	1972–1982	51	3	
49=	Martin Hiden	DF	1998–2008	50	1	
49=	Erich Obermayer	DF	1975–1985	50	1	
49=	Ivica Vastić	FW	1996–2008	50	14	
52	Manfred Zsak	MF	1986–1993	49	5	
53=	Harald Cerny	MF	1993–2004	47	4	
53=	Alfred Körner	FW	1946–1958	47	14	
55=	Wolfgang Feiersinger	DF	1990–1999	46	0	
55=	Johann Horvath	FW	1924–1934	46	29	
55=	Philipp Lienhart*	DF	2017–2026	46	3	
55=	Theodor Wagner	FW	1946–1957	46	22	
59	Florian Klein	DF	2010–2016	45	0	
60=	Fritz Gschweidl	FW	1924–1935	44	12	
60=	Karl Sesta	DF	1932–1945	44	1	(Note: Also represented Germany three times.)
62=	Mario Haas	FW	1996–2007	43	7	
62=	Michael Konsel	GK	1985–1998	43	0	
62=	Romano Schmid*	MF	2022–2026	43	5	
62=	Matthias Sindelar	FW	1924–1939	43	26	
62=	Gerhard Sturmberger	DF	1965–1970	43	0	
67=	Josef Brandstätter	MF	1912–1924	42	2	
67=	Hans Buzek	FW	1955–1969	42	9	
67=	Karl Stotz	DF	1950–1962	42	1	
67=	Walter Zeman	GK	1945–1960	42	0	
71=	György Garics	DF	2006–2016	41	2	
71=	Christoph Leitgeb	MF	2006–2014	41	0	
71=	Klaus Lindenberger	GK	1982–1990	41	0	
74=	Michael Baur	MF	1990–2003	40	5	
74=	Kevin Danso*	DF	2017–2026	40	0	
74=	Rudi Flögel	FW	1960–1969	40	5	
74=	Heimo Pfeifenberger	FW	1989–1998	40	9	
74=	Paul Scharner	DF	2002–2012	40	0	
74=	Ferdinand Wesely	FW	1922–1928	40	17	
74=	Karl Zischek	FW	1931–1945	40	24	
81=	Ernst Baumeister	MF	1978–1988	39	1	
81=	Josef Hickersberger	MF	1968–1978	39	5	
81=	Stefan Lainer*	DF	2017–2024	39	2	
81=	Roland Linz	FW	2002–2010	39	8	
81=	Walter Nausch	MF	1929–1937	39	1	
81=	Karl Rainer	DF	1924–1935	39	0	
81=	Josef Smistik	MF	1928–1936	39	2	
88	Kurt Schmied	GK	1954–1960	38	0	
89=	Johann Eigenstiller	DF	1967–1975	37	0	
89=	Thomas Flögel	MF	1992–2003	37	3	
89=	Erich Hof	FW	1957–1968	37	28	
89=	Heinz Lindner*	GK	2012–2024	37	0	
93=	Valentino Lazaro*	MF	2014–2022	36	3	
93=	Ernst Melchior	FW	1946–1953	36	16	
93=	Philipp Mwene*	DF	2021–2026	36	1	
93=	Patrick Wimmer*	MF	2022–2026	36	1	
97=	Walter Glechner	DF	1960–1968	35	1	
97=	Leopold Nitsch	FW	1915–1925	35	0	
97=	Alessandro Schöpf*	MF	2016–2026	35	6	
100=	Paul Halla	DF	1952–1965	34	2	
100=	Joachim Standfest	DF	2003–2008	34	2	
100=	Michael Streiter	DF	1989–1999	34	1	
100=	Maximilian Wöber*	DF	2017–2026	34	0	
104=	Robert Almer	GK	2011–2016	33	0	
104=	Alex Manninger	GK	1999–2009	33	0	
104=	Alexander Popovic	DF	1911–1923	33	1	
104=	Alexander Schlager*	GK	2019–2026	33	0	
108=	Karl Kurz	MF	1919–1928	32	0	
108=	Ernst Stojaspal	FW	1946–1954	32	14	
108=	Andreas Ulmer	DF	2009-2023	32	0	
111=	Erich Hasenkopf	DF	1956–1964	31	0	
111=	Norbert Hof	DF	1968–1974	31	1	
111=	Saša Kalajdžić*	FW	2020–2026	31	8	
111=	Veli Kavlak	MF	2007–2014	31	1	
111=	Robert Pecl	DF	1987–1993	31	1	
111=	Peter Platzer	GK	1931–1937	31	0	(Note: Also represented Germany two times.)
117=	Josef Degeorgi	DF	1982–1990	30	1	
117=	Hans Ettmayer	MF	1968–1975	30	0	
117=	Gerald Willfurth	MF	1983–1991	30	3	
120=	Christian Mayrleb	FW	1998–2005	29	6	
120=	Horst Nemec	FW	1959–1965	29	16	
120=	Louis Schaub*	MF	2016–2022	29	8	
120=	Roman Wallner	FW	2001–2010	29	7	
120=	Markus Weissenberger	MF	1999–2008	29	1	
125=	Erwin Hoffer	FW	2007–2012	28	4	
125=	Florian Kainz	FW	2014-2022	28	1	
125=	Roland Kirchler	MF	1993–2005	28	5	
125=	Helmut Köglberger	FW	1965–1976	28	6	
125=	Walter Kogler	DF	1991–2001	28	1	
125=	Leo Lainer	DF	1982–1994	28	1	
125=	Kurt Russ	DF	1988–1991	28	0	
125=	Anton Schall	FW	1927–1934	28	27	
125=	Hans Schmidradner	DF	1969–1974	28	1	
125=	Jan Studnicka	FW	1902–1918	28	18	
135=	Robert Dienst	FW	1949–1957	27	12	
135=	Gernot Fraydl	GK	1961–1970	27	0	
135=	Leopold Gernhardt	MF	1945–1952	27	0	
135=	Leopold Hofmann	MF	1925–1934	27	1	
135=	Alfred Hörtnagl	MF	1989–2000	27	1	
135=	Thomas Parits	FW	1966–1973	27	5	
135=	Gustav Wieser	FW	1916–1926	27	12	
142=	Guido Burgstaller	FW	2012–2023	26	2	
142=	Jürgen Macho	GK	2002–2011	26	0	
142=	Josef Stering	MF	1969–1977	26	5	
142=	Heinrich Strasser	DF	1969–1979	26	0	
142=	Andreas Weimann*	FW	2012–2026	26	2	
147=	Karl Decker	FW	1945–1952	25	19	(Note: Also represented Germany eight times.)
147=	Eduard Krieger	DF	1970–1978	25	0	
147=	Manfred Linzmaier	MF	1970–1978	25	2	
147=	Franz Schiemer	DF	2007–2013	25	4	
147=	Christopher Trimmel*	DF	2009–2022	25	1	

== See also ==
- List of Austria international footballers (1–24 caps)
