= UEFA Euro 1972 qualifying Group 6 =

Football tournament qualification stage

Group 6 of the UEFA Euro 1972 qualifying tournament was one of the eight groups to decide which teams would qualify for the UEFA Euro 1972 finals tournament. Group 6 consisted of four teams: Italy, Austria, Sweden, and Republic of Ireland, where they played against each other home-and-away in a round-robin format. The group winners were Italy, who finished three points above Austria.

== Final table ==
Pos	Team	Pld	W	D	L	GF	GA	GD	Pts	Qualification	(Italy)	(Austria)	(Sweden)	(Republic of Ireland)
1	Italy	6	4	2	0	12	4	+8	10	Advance to quarter-finals	—	2–2	3–0	3–0
2	Austria	6	3	1	2	14	6	+8	7		1–2	—	1–0	6–0
3	Sweden	6	2	2	2	3	5	−2	6		0–0	1–0	—	1–0
4	Republic of Ireland	6	0	1	5	3	17	−14	1		1–2	1–4	1–1	—

Source: UEFA
Rules for classification: Qualification tiebreakers

== Matches ==
14 October 1970
20:00

Republic of Ireland	1–1	Sweden
Carroll 44' (pen.)	Report	Brzokoupil 61'

Dalymount Park, Dublin
Attendance: 28,194
Referee: Robert Héliès (France)

28 October 1970
19:00

Sweden	1–0	Republic of Ireland
Turesson 74'	Report

Råsunda Stadion, Solna(Stockholm)
Attendance: 11,922
Referee: Pavel Kazakov (USSR)

31 October 1970
15:00

Austria	1–2	Italy
Parits 29'	Report	De Sisti 27'; Mazzola 34'

Praterstadion, Vienna
Attendance: 54,953
Referee: Laurens van Ravens (Netherlands)

8 December 1970
14:30

Italy	3–0	Republic of Ireland
De Sisti 22' (pen.); Boninsegna 42'; Prati 84'	Report

Stadio Comunale, Florence
Attendance: 41,092
Referee: Robert Schaut (Belgium)

10 May 1971
19:00

Republic of Ireland	1–2	Italy
Conway 23'	Report	Boninsegna 15'; Prati 59'

Lansdowne Road, Dublin
Attendance: 22,613
Referee: Gerhard Schulenburg (West Germany)

26 May 1971
19:00

Sweden	1–0	Austria
Olsson 62'	Report

Råsunda Stadion, Solna(Stockholm)
Attendance: 5,416
Referee: Stanisław Eksztajn (Poland)

30 May 1971
15:30

Republic of Ireland	1–4	Austria
Rogers 46' (pen.)	Report	Schmidradner 4' (pen.); Kodat 11'; T. Dunne 31' (o.g.); Starek 71'

Dalymount Park, Dublin
Attendance: 14,674
Referee: Henry Øberg (Norway)

9 June 1971
19:00

Sweden	0–0	Italy
	Report

Råsunda Stadion, Solna(Stockholm)
Attendance: 36,528
Referee: Rudolf Scheurer (Switzerland)

4 September 1971
15:00

Austria	1–0	Sweden
Stering 23'	Report

Praterstadion, Vienna
Attendance: 38,274
Referee: Rudolf Glöckner (East Germany)

9 October 1971
14:30

Italy	3–0	Sweden
Riva 3', 83'; Boninsegna 40'	Report

Stadio San Siro, Milan
Attendance: 65,582
Referee: Roger Machin (France)

10 October 1971
15:00

Austria	6–0	Republic of Ireland
Jara 12', 85'; Pirkner 41' (pen.); Parits 45', 51', 89'	Report

Linzer Stadion, Linz
Attendance: 15,050
Referee: Karl Göppel (Switzerland)

20 November 1971
14:30

Italy	2–2	Austria
Prati 10'; De Sisti 75'	Report	Jara 36'; Sara 59'

Stadio Olimpico, Rome
Attendance: 58,752
Referee: Gyula Emsberger (Hungary)

== Goalscorers ==
There were 32 goals scored in 12 matches, for an average of 2.67 goals per match.

4 goals

- (Austria) Thomas Parits

3 goals

- (Austria) Kurt Jara
- (Italy) Roberto Boninsegna
- (Italy) Giancarlo De Sisti
- (Italy) Pierino Prati

2 goals

- (Italy) Luigi Riva

1 goal

- (Austria) Karl Kodat
- (Austria) Hans Pirkner
- (Austria) Robert Sara
- (Austria) Hans Schmidradner
- (Austria) August Starek
- (Austria) Josef Stering
- (Italy) Sandro Mazzola
- (Republic of Ireland) Tommy Carroll
- (Republic of Ireland) Jimmy Conway
- (Republic of Ireland) Eamonn Rogers
- (Sweden) Dan Brzokoupil
- (Sweden) Jan Olsson
- (Sweden) Tom Turesson

1 own goal

- (Republic of Ireland) Tony Dunne (against Austria)
