= Wolfgang Breuer =

German footballer (born 1944)

Personal information
- Date of birth: 24 May 1944 (age 82)
- Place of birth: Bayreuth, Gau Bayreuth, Germany
- Position: Midfielder

Youth career
- 1954–1965: TuSpo Bayreuth

Senior career*
Years	Team	Apps	(Gls)
1965–1972	Bayern Hof		
1972–1974	Wacker Innsbruck		
1974–1982	SpVgg Bayreuth		
- * Club domestic league appearances and goals

Wolfgang Breuer (born 24 May 1944) is a German retired footballer. Nicknamed "Bobby", he played as a midfielder for Bayern Hof and SpVgg Bayreuth within the 2. Bundesliga as well as playing abroad in Austria for Wacker Innsbruck throughout the late 1960s and the 1970s.

== Career ==
=== Youth career (1954–1965) ===
Throughout his youth career, Breuer went through all age groups of the youth department of Tuspo Bayreuth. In 1962, he was promoted to the 1st team and celebrated promotion twice with Tuspo as one of the club's main goalscorers. During his military service in 1964, he played within the military and played together with future SpVgg Bayreuth Manfred Größler. Following his time in the Bundeswehr, he left his hometown club in 1965 as Bayern Hof took interest in the midfielder.

=== SpVgg Bayern Hof (1965–1971) ===
For the 1965–66 Regionalliga, despite only having around two training sessions a week within TuSpo Bayreuth, he accustomed himself quickly to professional football as he scored 21 out of 71 goals of Bayern Hof. Despite Hof reaching only 9th place, Breuer was the second highest goalscorer of the Regionalliga Süd, behind just Willibald Mikulasch of ESV Ingolstadt who scored 29 goals. The following 1966–67 Regionalliga saw Breuer increase his goal count to 28, helping Hof reach the promotional playoffs due to being runners-up. Now under manager Heinz Elzner, he often played with Siegfried Stark within the midfield which was a significant contribution to the club's success. However, the playoffs saw Borussia Neunkirchen ultimately come out on top within their group stage with their success being attributed to their higher spending budget with Bayern Hof only achieving fourth place.

His third season within the 1967–68 Regionalliga saw further improvements as Bayern Hof had managed to win the Regionalliga Süd with Breuer scoring 27 goals, helping them edge out a single point over runners-up Kickers Offenbach. These improvements were also seen in the playoffs against rivals Hertha BSC, Rot-Weiss Essen, SV Alsenborn and Göttingen 05 with 8 goals, being the top scorer within the competition. However, Breuer's efforts weren't enough as the club finished fifth within their group as Hertha were promoted instead. The following two seasons saw Breuer score an additional two goals though momentum within Bayern Hof began to decline with the club achieving 3rd and 4th place. The 1970–71 Regionalliga was an especially poor season for Breuer he spent with Bayern Hof as he only made 18 appearances and scored 8 goals due to being repeatedly prone to injury as well as being sick throughout. The club later returned back to form in Breuer's final season with the club, achieving the playoffs once more and kicking off TSV 1860 Munich from the runners-up position. Throughout the first playoff match against Kickers Offenbach on 22 April 1972 against a star lineup consisting of Winfried Schäfer, Horst Gecks, Erwin Kostedde and Sigfried Held, Breuer managed to hold the team off and achieve a 2–2 draw. Throughout the other matches, he scored 4 goals alongside 27 goals from the league as a whole. His final appearance for Bayern Hof came against VfL Osnabrück on 25 June 1972 as he became the top goalscorer of all time in the Regionalliga Süd with 170 goals in 243 matches.

Despite only playing within the Regionalliga, Breuer had developed a reputation of being one of the league's best players and received offers from Bundesliga giants such as Bayern Munich, Köln, Stuttgart and Kaiserslautern especially. Breuer however, ultimately chose to play abroad in Austria for Wacker Innsbruck as he got to know the players of the team through several prior friendlies and maintained contact with Breuer for months as he felt that a career in Austria was more sustainable than a career within the Bundesliga due to the prominence of players such as Franz Beckenbauer, Gerd Müller and Günter Netzer.

=== Wacker Innsbruck (1972–1974) ===
Upon Breuer's arrival to the Tyrolian capital in 1972, the club had just had back-to-back success at the 1970–71 and 1971–72 Austrian football championship and had met players such as Johann Eigenstiller, Roland Eschlmüller, Friedrich Koncilia, Walter Skocik, Werner Kriess, Roland Hattenberger, Franz Wolny, Helmut Siber, Kurt Jara and Ove Flindt-Bjerg as he and fellow German footballer Hans Rebele were set to fill in the ranks for the club. The initial first half of the 1972–73 season saw initial internal implosion due to manager Egon Herlan suddenly announce his departure without initial notice and Breuer had yet to find his footing within Austrian football. However, the club soon restructured following the arrival of Yugoslav manager Branko Elsner as the club bounced back throughout the spring of 1973 and Breuer was able to disuade detractors from his abilities as he became the top scorer of the season with 22 registered goals ahead of Lother Emmerich of Austria Klagenfurt. His season was noted by four 1–0 victories all scored by him as well as two hat tricks scored against Austria Klagenfurt and Donawitzer SV Alpine in 5–0 and 7–1 beatings respectively whilst forming an attacking composition with Flindt-Bjerg, Breuer and Jara, going on to continue the club's success by winning their third consecutive title.

That same season saw the club participate at the 1972–73 European Cup but they were pitted against Soviet club Dynamo Kyiv as players such as Oleg Blokhin, Yevhen Rudakov and Volodymyr Muntyan as the club won both matches in September 1972. The following 1973–74 season saw Breuer begin to retreat to the attacking midfield as he scored 11 goals throughout the season though their win streak would be broken due to the club narrowly missing out on the title due to the final matchday resulting in a draw against SK Sturm Graz. The 1973–74 European Cup similarly saw no success as Bulgarian club CSKA Sofia won throughout both matches as they later made it to the quarter-finals after being eliminated by Bayern Munich. This lack of success saw Breuer return to Germany though instead of returning to Bayern Hof, he instead returned to his hometown of Bayreuth.

=== SpVgg Bayreuth (1974–1982) ===
Hans Walter Wild, Mayor of Bayreuth from 1958 to 1988 and a great supporter of football, was one of the main initiators of the successful repatriation of "Bobby" Breuer to Bayreuth in 1974. The popularity of the player, the construction of his own home in the Birken district and the introduction of the 2. Bundesliga allowed Breuer to join SpVgg Bayreuth and lead the club to success. Due to the competition with FC Bayern Hof, which still existed in 1974, this personnel matter was also explosive. On the ninth matchday, the first meeting of the 1974–75 season between the two Upper Franconian rivals took place in the Municipal Stadium on Ellrodtweg in Bayreuth in front of 10,000 spectators. Bayreuth won with 1–:0 goals. However, the away match at Hof saw a goalless 0-0. To the disappointment of the Hofer fans, "Bobby" Breuer was unable to play in this game at his old stomping ground. Hof finished fourth at the end of the round ahead of Bayreuth's ninth place finish with Breuer playing 36 goals with 9 goals.

Now together with Manfred Größler, the two formed a midfield duo across the 2. Bundesliga Süd as they also played with Uwe Sommerer. Upon the arrival of former Hof manager Heinz Elzner during the 1977–78 season, the club became one of the most competitive within the 2. Bundesliga as the season saw them leading the group throughout the majority of the season. However, a series of goalless defeats within matchdays 21 to 24 saw the momentum decrease significantly, ending in 4th by the end. However, Breuer still scored goals as he made 12 goals throughout 34 appearances as well as scoring 4 goals in a 5–1 beating against VfR Oli Bürstadt on 4 December 1977.

The following 1978–79 season saw a far better end result as the club managed to reach runners-up and by proxy, head into the playoffs against Bayer 05 Uerdingen who were runners up within the 2. Bundesliga Nord. The first matchday on 14 June 1979 ended in a 1–1 draw as Bayer 05 later won 2–1 in the second leg. Despite Breuer's age, he still managed to score 14 goals within 35 matches. The club's participation at the 1979–80 DFB-Pokal had also been a period of success due to the club making it all the way to the quarterfinals, making headlines for their upset victory over Bayern Munich on 12 January 1980 as Breuer played alongside Klaus Brand and Herbert Horn. Breuer's final seasons saw him as a libero with the 1981–82 season seeing his last appearance on 29 May 1982 against SC Freiburg, scoring 247 total goals throughout his entire career.

== Later life ==
Professionally, Wolfgang Breuer was employed by the city administration of Bayreuth for 29 years. He celebrates an annual tradition of reuniting with his old Bayern Hof teammates before the Christmas holidays whilst maintaining contact with his old Wacker Innsbruck teammates. He also got married in 1966 later had a son, a daughter and a grandchild.
