= UEFA Euro 1968 qualifying Group 3 =

Football tournament qualifying stage

Group 3 of the UEFA Euro 1968 qualifying tournament was one of the eight groups to decide which teams would qualify for the UEFA Euro 1968 finals tournament. Group 3 consisted of four teams: Soviet Union, Greece, Austria, and Finland, where they played against each other home-and-away in a round-robin format. The group winners were the Soviet Union, who finished 5 points above Greece.

== Final table ==
Pos	Team	Pld	W	D	L	GF	GA	GD	Pts	Qualification	(Soviet Union)	(Greece)	(Austria)	(Finland)
1	Soviet Union	6	5	0	1	16	6	+10	10	Advance to quarter-finals	—	4–0	4–3	2–0
2	Greece	5	2	1	2	7	8	−1	5		0–1	—	4–1	2–1
3	Austria	5	2	1	2	7	9	−2	5		1–0	Void (Note: The Austria v Greece match was abandoned in the 86th minute at 1–1 due to a crowd disturbance and declared void.)	—	2–1
4	Finland	6	0	2	4	5	12	−7	2		2–5	1–1	0–0	—

Source: UEFA
Rules for classification: Qualification tiebreakers

== Matches ==
2 October 1966
14:00

Finland	0–0	Austria
	Report

Olympiastadion, Helsinki
Attendance: 10,070
Referee: Peter Coates (Rep. of Ireland)

16 October 1966
15:30

Greece	2–1	Finland
Alexiadis 39', 86'	Report	Mäkipää 57'

Kaftatzoglio Stadio, Salonika
Attendance: 28,478
Referee: Zdeněk Valeš (Czechoslovakia)

10 May 1967
18:00

Finland	1–1	Greece
Peltonen 18'	Report	Chaitas 39'

Olympiastadion, Helsinki
Attendance: 14,056
Referee: Pieter Roomer (Netherlands)

11 June 1967
19:00

Soviet Union	4–3	Austria
Malofeyev 25'; Byshovets 36'; Chislenko 43'; Streltsov 80'	Report	Hof 38'; Wolny 54'; Siber 71'

Central Lenin Stadium, Moscow
Attendance: 72,142
Referee: Johan Einar Boström (Sweden)

16 July 1967
19:00

Soviet Union	4–0	Greece
Banishevskiy 50', 77'; Sabo 72' (pen.); Chislenko 83'	Report

Central Stadium Dynamo, Tbilisi
Attendance: 28,040
Referee: Birger Nilsen (Norway)

30 August 1967
19:00

Soviet Union	2–0	Finland
Khurtsilava 14'; Chislenko 80'	Report

Central Lenin Stadium, Moscow
Attendance: 20,597
Referee: Muzaffer Sarvan (Turkey)

6 September 1967
17:30

Finland	2–5	Soviet Union
Peltonen 18' (pen.); Syrjävaara 25'	Report	Sabo 2', 56' (pen.); Maslov 14'; Banishevskiy 35'; Malofeyev 63'

Kupittaan Stadion, Turku
Attendance: 7,793
Referee: Pavel Špoták (Czechoslovakia)

24 September 1967
15:00

Austria	2–1	Finland
Flögel 17'; Grausam 81'	Report	Peltonen 57'

Praterstadion, Vienna
Attendance: 25,231
Referee: Milivoje Gugulović (Yugoslavia)

4 October 1967 (Note: The Greece v Austria match, originally scheduled on 23 April 1967, was postponed to 4 October 1967 due to the Greek coup d'état on 21 April 1967.)
20:30

Greece	4–1	Austria
Sideris 27', 34' (pen.), 63'; Papaioannou 75'	Report	Grausam 62'

Stadio Karaiskaki, Piraeus (Athens)
Attendance: 34,552
Referee: Vasile Dumitrescu (Romania)

15 October 1967
14:30

Austria	1–0	Soviet Union
Grausam 50'	Report

Praterstadion, Vienna
Attendance: 37,400
Referee: Todor Bechirov (Bulgaria)

31 October 1967
15:30

Greece	0–1	Soviet Union
	Report	Malofeyev 50'

Stadio Karaiskaki, Piraeus (Athens)
Attendance: 33,588
Referee: Gottfried Dienst (Switzerland)

5 November 1967
14:30

Austria	Annulled (Note: The Austria v Greece match was abandoned in the 86th minute at 1–1 due to a crowd disturbance and declared void.)	Greece
Siber 31'	Report	Sideris 71'

Praterstadion, Vienna
Attendance: 31,996
Referee: Gyula Gere (Hungary)

== Goalscorers ==
There were 37 goals scored in 12 matches, for an average of 3.08 goals per match. (Note: The matches/goals tally takes into account fixtures that were subsequently annulled.)

4 goals

- (Greece national football team) Giorgos Sideris

3 goals

- (Austria national football team) Leopold Grausam
- (Finland national football team) Juhani Peltonen
- (Soviet Union national football team) Anatoliy Banishevskiy
- (Soviet Union national football team) Igor Chislenko
- (Soviet Union national football team) Eduard Malofeyev
- (Soviet Union national football team) Yozhef Sabo

2 goals

- (Austria national football team) Helmut Siber
- (Greece national football team) Alekos Alexiadis

1 goal

- (Austria national football team) Rudi Flögel
- (Austria national football team) Erich Hof
- (Austria national football team) Franz Wolny
- (Finland national football team) Pertti Mäkipää
- (Finland national football team) Simo Syrjävaara
- (Greece national football team) Stathis Chaitas
- (Greece national football team) Mimis Papaioannou
- (Soviet Union national football team) Anatoliy Byshovets
- (Soviet Union national football team) Murtaz Khurtsilava
- (Soviet Union national football team) Valery Maslov
- (Soviet Union national football team) Eduard Streltsov
