= Eduard Malofeyev =

Soviet-Belarusian footballer and coach

Personal information
- Full name: Eduard Vasilyevich Malofeyev
- Date of birth: 2 June 1942 (age 84)
- Place of birth: Krasnoyarsk, RSFSR, Soviet Union
- Height: 1.75 m (5 ft 9 in)
- Position: Forward

Youth career
- Avangard Kolomna

Senior career*
Years	Team	Apps	(Gls)
1960	Avangard Kolomna		
1961–1962	Spartak Moscow	4	(0)
1963–1972	Dinamo Minsk	278	(114)
Total		282	(114)

International career
1963–1968	Soviet Union	40	(6)
1964–1968	Soviet Union Olympic	4	(0)

Managerial career
- 1972–1973: Dinamo Minsk (youth)
- 1974–1975: Dinamo Minsk (assistant)
- 1977–1978: Dinamo Brest
- 1978–1983: Dinamo Minsk
- 1983–1984: Soviet Union olympic team
- 1984–1986: Soviet Union
- 1985–1987: Dinamo Moscow
- 1988–1991: Dinamo Minsk
- 1992: Asmaral Kislovodsk
- 1993–1994: Dinamo-Gazovik Tyumen
- 1995: Smena Minsk
- 1995: Dinamo-Gazovik Tyumen
- 1996–1998: Anzhi Makhachkala
- 1999–2000: Pskov
- 2000–2003: Belarus
- 2001–2002: Dinamo Minsk
- 2003: Fakel Voronezh
- 2005: MTZ-RIPO Minsk (youth)
- 2005–2006: FBK Kaunas
- 2006: Heart of Midlothian (caretaker)
- 2006–2007: MTZ-RIPO Minsk
- 2007: Šilutė
- 2008–2009: Dynamo Saint Petersburg
- 2009–2010: Shakhtyor Soligorsk
- 2010: Dynamo Saint Petersburg
- 2010–2011: Pskov-747
Medal record
Representing Soviet Union
UEFA European Championship
Runner-up	1964 Spain
- * Club domestic league appearances and goals

Eduard Vasilyevich Malofeyev (Russian: Эдуа́рд Васи́льевич Малофе́ев, IPA: [məlɐˈfʲeɪf], Belarusian: Эдуард Васілевіч Малафееў; born 2 June 1942) is a Soviet and Belarusian football coach and former international player of Russian origin.

Despite being born and grown in Russian SFSR, Malofeyev rose to prominence in Belarus, having scored over 100 goals in Soviet Top League for Dinamo Minsk. He led Dinamo Minsk to the team's only Soviet champions title, and coached Belarus national football team.

== Life and career ==
Malofeyev played for Avangard Kolomna (1960), Spartak Moscow (1961–1962) and Dinamo Minsk (1963–1972). In 1962, he won the Soviet championship with Spartak.

He was capped 40 times for the USSR national team in 1963–1968 and scored 6 goals. He participated in UEFA Euro 1964 and 1968 as well World Cup 1966.

As a coach, Malofeyev led Dinamo Minsk to the championship in the Soviet Top League in 1982. In 1984–1986 he was the head coach for USSR. The national team qualified for the 1986 World Cup but he was fired shortly before the World Cup started in favor of Valeriy Lobanovskyi. He also coached the Belarus national football team from 2000 to 2003.

Between 2004 and 2007 he worked in all three clubs associated with Vladimir Romanov's holding (Belarusian MTZ-RIPO Minsk, Lithuanian FBK Kaunas and Scottish Hearts) in various coaching and administrative positions.

In later years he coached Dynamo Saint Petersburg (whom he led to promotion to the Russian First Division in 2009), Shakhtyor Soligorsk and Pskov-747.

== International goals ==
No.	Date	Venue	Opponent	Score	Result	Competition
1.	17 October 1965	Copenhagen, Denmark	Denmark	2–0	3–1	1966 FIFA World Cup qualification
2.	12 July 1966	Middlesbrough, England	North Korea	1–0	3–0	1966 FIFA World Cup
3.	12 July 1966	Middlesbrough, England	North Korea	3–0	3–0	1966 FIFA World Cup
4.	28 July 1966	London, England	Portugal	1–1	1-2	1966 FIFA World Cup
5.	11 June 1967	Moscow, Soviet Union	Austria	1–0	4–3	UEFA Euro 1968 qualifying
6.	6 September 1967	Turku, Finland	Finland	5–2	5–2	UEFA Euro 1968 qualifying
7.	31 October 1967	Piraeus, Greece	Greece	1–0	1–0	UEFA Euro 1968 qualifying
