= Walter Hiesel =

Austrian footballer

Personal information
- Date of birth: 13 March 1944 (age 82)

International career
Years	Team	Apps	(Gls)
1964–1966	Austria	2	(0)

Walter Hiesel (born 13 March 1944) is an Austrian footballer. He played in two matches for the Austria national football team from 1964 to 1966.
