= Johann Löser =

Austrian footballer (1937–2020)

Personal information
- Date of birth: 23 March 1937
- Date of death: 25 September 2020 (aged 83)
- Position: Defender

Senior career*
Years	Team	Apps	(Gls)
- Austria Wien

International career
1962	Austria	1	(0)

Managerial career
- 1974: Stockerau
- 1975: Austria Wien
- 1977–1978: Tulln
- * Club domestic league appearances and goals

Johann Löser (23 March 1937 – 25 September 2020) was an Austrian football player and manager. A defender, he played for Austria Wien and made one appearance for the Austria national team in 1962.
