= Helmut Metzler =

Austrian footballer (1945–2024)

Personal information
- Date of birth: 5 March 1945
- Place of birth: Hohenems, Austria
- Date of death: 16 August 2024 (aged 79)
- Position: Forward

Senior career*
Years	Team	Apps	(Gls)
1963–1965	Austria Lustenau		
1965–1966	Wiener Sport-Club	21	(9)
1966–1969	Schwarz-Weiß Bregenz	69	(15)
1969–1970	1. FC Nürnberg		
1970–1972	Nice	3	(1)
1973	FC Vorarlberg	13	(4)
1973–1976	SSW Innsbruck	58	(11)
1976–1977	FC Young Fellows Zürich		

International career
1967–1969	Austria	6	(0)
- * Club domestic league appearances and goals

Helmut Metzler (5 March 1945 – 16 August 2024) was an Austrian footballer who played as a forward. He made six appearances for the Austria national team from 1967 to 1969.
