= Adolf Macek =

Austrian footballer (1939–1993)

Adolf Macek-
Personal information
- Date of birth: 16 December 1939
- Place of birth: Grödig, Austria
- Date of death: 20 July 1993 (aged 53)

Senior career*
Years	Team	Apps	(Gls)
1958–1959	SV Grödig		
1959–1973	Austria Salzburg		
1973–1975	SK Bischofshofen		

International career
1965–1966	Austria	4	(0)
- * Club domestic league appearances and goals

Adolf Macek (16 December 1939 – 20 July 1993) was an Austrian footballer who played as a midfielder for Austria Salzburg. He made four appearances for the Austria national team from 1965 to 1966.
