= Herbert Rettensteiner =

Austrian footballer

Personal information
- Date of birth: 26 August 1946 (age 80)
- Place of birth: Schwarzach im Pongau, Austria
- Height: 1.80 m (5 ft 11 in)
- Position: Goalkeeper

Senior career*
Years	Team	Apps	(Gls)
1966–1967	SK Bischofshofen		
1967–1972	SSW Innsbruck	107	(0)
1972–1975	SK VÖEST Linz	71	(0)
1975–1982	SV Austria Salzburg	163	(2)

International career
1970–1975	Austria	15	(0)
- * Club domestic league appearances and goals

Herbert Rettensteiner (born 26 August 1946) is a retired Austrian football goalkeeper who played for Austria. He also played for SSW Innsbruck, SK VÖEST Linz and SV Austria Salzburg.
