= Johann Windisch =

Austrian footballer (1941–2021)

Personal information
- Date of birth: 5 February 1941 (age 85)
- Place of birth: Austria
- Position: Defender

Senior career*
Years	Team	Apps	(Gls)
1958–1966	Wiener Sport-Club	159	(1)
1966–1967	Wacker Wien	25	(2)
1967–1968	First Vienna FC	25	(2)
1968–1969	WSV Donawitz	14	(0)

International career
1960–1964	Austria	9	(0)

Managerial career
- 1983–1985: WSV Donawitz
- 1986–1987: Kapfenberger SV
- 1987–1988: WSV Donawitz
- * Club domestic league appearances and goals

Johann Windisch (born 5 January 1941, died 24 August 2021) was an Austrian football defender who played for Austria. He also played for Wiener Sport-Club, Wacker Wien, First Vienna FC and WSV Donawitz.
