= Franz Viehböck (footballer) =

Austrian footballer

Personal information
- Date of birth: 15 October 1938
- Place of birth: Austria
- Position: Defender

Senior career*
Years	Team	Apps	(Gls)
1962–1964	SVS Linz	72	(30)
1964–1975	Linzer ASK	232	(35)

International career
1967–1970	Austria	18	(2)

Managerial career
- 1971: Linzer ASK
- * Club domestic league appearances and goals

Franz Viehböck (born 15 October 1938) is a retired Austrian football defender who played for Austria. He also played for SVS Linz and Linzer ASK.
