= Günther Rinker =

Austrian footballer

Personal information
- Date of birth: 12 March 1950 (age 76)
- Position: Forward

Senior career*
Years	Team	Apps	(Gls)
- WSG Wattens
- Wiener Sport-Club
- WSG Wattens
- SSW Innsbruck
- SV Rapid Lienz

International career
1975–1976	Austria	2	(1)

Managerial career
- 1982–1984: SV Rapid Lienz
- 1987–1988: FC Tirol Innsbruck
- 1992–1993: WSG Wattens
- * Club domestic league appearances and goals

Günther Rinker (born 12 March 1950) is an Austrian former football player and manager who played as a forward. He made two appearances for the Austria national team from 1975 to 1976.
