= Friedrich Rafreider =

Austrian footballer

Personal information
- Date of birth: 24 February 1942
- Place of birth: Haselstauden, Dornbirn, Nazi Germany
- Date of death: 15 September 2007 (aged 65)
- Place of death: Dornbirn, Austria
- Position: Midfielder

Senior career*
Years	Team	Apps	(Gls)
- FC Dornbirn
- Wiener Sport-Club
- Schwarz-Weiß Bregenz
- St. Gallen

International career
1961–1963	Austria	14	(2)
- * Club domestic league appearances and goals

Friedrich Rafreider (24 February 1942 – 15 September 2007) was an Austrian footballer who played as a midfielder. He made 14 appearances for the Austria national team from 1961 to 1963.
