= Günther Paulitsch =

Austrian footballer

Personal information
- Date of birth: 14 November 1939 (age 86)

International career
Years	Team	Apps	(Gls)
1964	Austria	1	(0)

Günther Paulitsch (born 14 November 1939) is an Austrian footballer. He played in one match for the Austria national football team in 1964.
