= Peter Clement (footballer) =

Austrian footballer

Personal information
- Date of birth: 27 March 1946 (age 80)
- Place of birth: Vienna, Austria
- Position: Defender

International career
Years	Team	Apps	(Gls)
1970	Austria	2	(0)

Peter Clement (born 27 March 1946) is an Austrian footballer. He played in two matches for the Austria national football team in 1970.
