= Roman Pichler (footballer) =

Austrian footballer

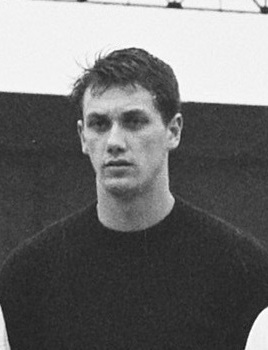
- Pichler in 1964

Personal information
- Date of birth: 5 March 1941 (age 85)
- Position: Goalkeeper

International career
Years	Team	Apps	(Gls)
1960–1967	Austria	13	(0)

Roman Pichler (born 5 March 1941) is an Austrian former footballer who played as a goalkeeper. He made 13 appearances for the Austria national team from 1960 to 1967.
