= Rudolf Horvath (footballer) =

Austrian footballer

Personal information
- Date of birth: 7 December 1947 (age 78)
- Place of birth: Nikitsch, Austria
- Position: Defender

Senior career*
Years	Team	Apps	(Gls)
1966–1967	1.Schwechater SC		
1967–1970	SV Austria Salzburg	77	(14)
1970–1973	SK VÖEST Linz	78	(6)
1973–1977	SSW Innsbruck	95	(12)
1978–1979	FC Dornbirn 1913		
1980–1982	FC Blau Weiß Feldkirch		

International career
1968–1976	Austria	16	(0)
- * Club domestic league appearances and goals

Rudolf Horvath (born 7 December 1947) is a retired Austrian football defender who played for Austria. He also played for 1.Schwechater SC, SV Austria Salzburg, SK VÖEST Linz, SSW Innsbruck, FC Dornbirn 1913 and FC Blau Weiß Feldkirch.
