= Gerfried Hodschar =

Austrian footballer (1945–2025)

Personal information
- Date of birth: 24 March 1945
- Date of death: 27 September 2025 (aged 80)
- Position: Goalkeeper

Senior career*
Years	Team	Apps	(Gls)
1964–1965	Sturm Graz	0	(0)
1965–1970	Grazer AK	71	(0)
1970–1972	SC Red Star Penzing		
1972–1973	Austria Wien	15	(0)

International career
1967–1968	Austria	2	(0)
- * Club domestic league appearances and goals

Gerfried Hodschar (24 March 1945 – 27 September 2025) was an Austrian footballer who played as a goalkeeper. He made two appearances for the Austria national team from 1967 to 1968. Hodschar died on 27 September 2025, at the age of 80.
