= Karl Fröhlich =

Austrian footballer

Personal information
- Date of birth: 15 April 1944 (age 82)
- Place of birth: Vienna, Austria
- Position: Defender

Senior career*
| Years | Team | Apps | (Gls) |
| 1966–1967 | FK Austria Wien | 213 | (0) |
| 1967–1970 | SV Admira Wiener Neustadt | | |

International career
| 1968–1976 | Austria | 8 | (0) |
- * Club domestic league appearances and goals

Karl Fröhlich (born 15 April 1944) is a retired Austrian football defender who played for Austria. He also played for FK Austria Wien and SV Admira Wiener Neustadt.
