= Heribert Trubrig =

Austrian footballer (1935–2020)

Personal information
- Date of birth: 1 October 1935
- Place of birth: Austria
- Date of death: 5 March 2020 (aged 84)
- Place of death: Linz, Austria
- Position: Defender

Senior career*
Years	Team	Apps	(Gls)
1959–1969	LASK		

International career
1960–1962	Austria	10	(0)
- * Club domestic league appearances and goals

Heribert Trubrig (1 October 1935 – 5 March 2020) was an Austrian football defender. He played for Linzer ASK, and made 10 appearances for the Austria national football team.
