= Wilhelm Harreither =

Austrian footballer

Personal information
- Date of birth: 27 October 1945
- Place of birth: Austria
- Position: Goalkeeper

Senior career*
Years	Team	Apps	(Gls)
1963–1964	SK Amateure Steyr		
1964–1974	Linzer ASK		

International career
1969–1974	Austria	13	(0)
- * Club domestic league appearances and goals

Wilhelm Harreither (born 27 October 1945) is a retired Austrian football goalkeeper who played for Austria. He also played for SK Amateure Steyr and Linzer ASK.
