= Heinz Russ =

Austrian footballer (born 1939)

Personal information
- Date of birth: 5 October 1939 (age 87)

International career
Years	Team	Apps	(Gls)
1968	Austria	2	(0)

Heinz Russ (born 5 October 1939) is an Austrian footballer. He played in two matches for the Austria national football team in 1968.
