= Josef Wahl =

Austrian footballer

Personal information
- Date of birth: 28 March 1943 (age 83)

International career
Years	Team	Apps	(Gls)
1966	Austria	1	(0)

Josef Wahl (born 28 March 1943) is an Austrian footballer. He played in one match for the Austria national football team in 1966.
