= Giancarlo De Sisti =

Italian footballer and manager

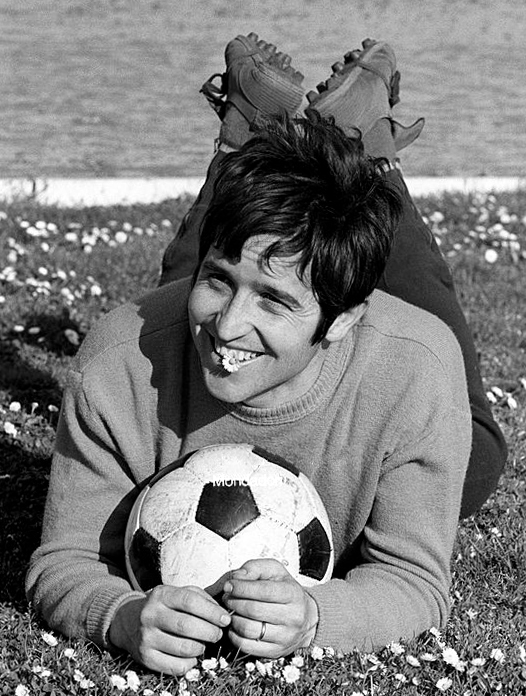
- De Sisti in 1969

Personal information
- Date of birth: 13 March 1943 (age 83)
- Place of birth: Rome, Italy
- Position: Midfielder

Senior career*
| Years | Team | Apps | (Gls) |
| 1960–1965 | Roma | 87 | (13) |
| 1965–1974 | Fiorentina | 256 | (28) |
| 1974–1979 | Roma | 135 | (9) |
| Total | | 478 | (50) |

International career
| 1967–1972 | Italy | 29 | (4) |

Managerial career
- 1981–1985: Fiorentina
- 1985–1987: Udinese
- 1991–1992: Ascoli
Medal record
Men's football
Representing Italy (as player)
UEFA European Championship
| Winner | 1968 Italy |
FIFA World Cup
| Runner-up | 1970 Mexico |
- * Club domestic league appearances and goals

Giancarlo De Sisti (Italian pronunciation: [dʒaŋˈkarlo de ˈsisti]; born 13 March 1943) is a retired Italian footballer and football manager and midfielder player.

== Club career ==
Best known by his nickname Picchio, during his club career, De Sisti played for his hometown club A.S. Roma on two occasions (1960–65, 1974–79), and ACF Fiorentina (1965–74), winning several domestic and international titles with both clubs. He made his debut in Serie A with Roma in a 2–1 away defeat to Udinese, on 12 February 1961, in which he observed the team's star player and mentor Juan Alberto Schiaffino during his first spell at the club. He enjoyed his most successful period with Fiorentina, which included a league title in 1969, the club's second overall, before returning to Roma in 1974. He won the Coppa Italia with both clubs, in 1964 and 1966.

== International career ==
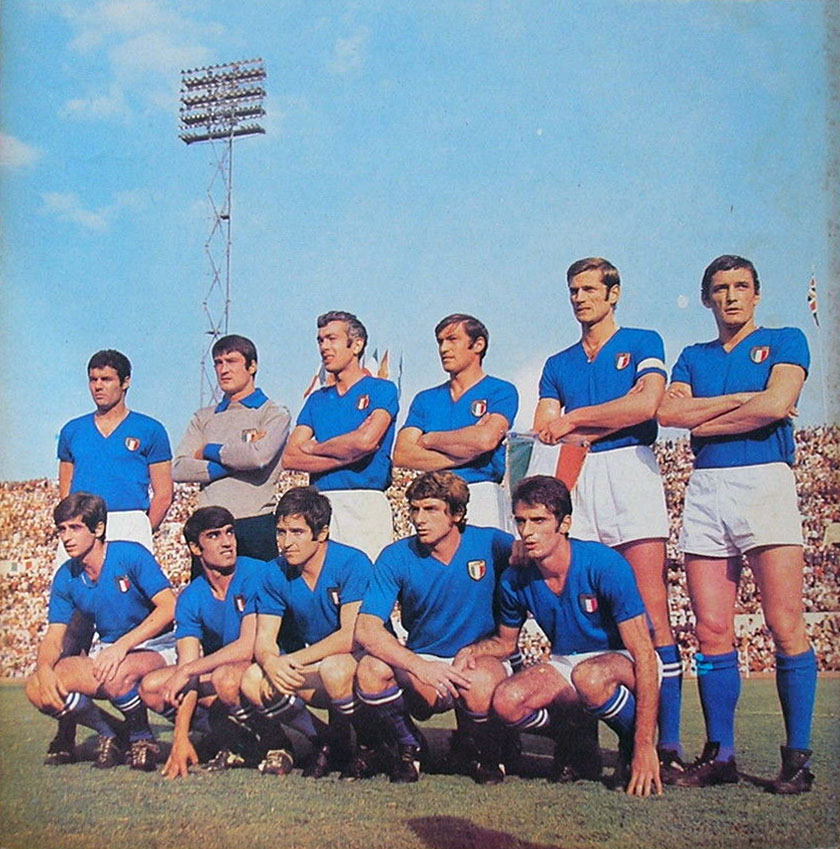
De Sisti (kneeling, in the middle) with the Italy national team in 1969

Internationally, De Sisti earned 29 caps and scored 4 goals for the Italy national football team between 1967 and 1972, making his debut on 1 November 1967, in a 5–0 home win over Cyprus in a UEFA Euro 1968 qualifying match. He later played in the European championship-winning team at Euro 1968 on home soil, appearing in the 2–0 final replay victory over Yugoslavia in Rome, at the age of 25. He was also a member of the Italian side that finished runners-up at the 1970 FIFA World Cup in Mexico.

== Coaching career ==
Following his retirement, De Sisti pursued a coaching career, achieving his coaching badges in 1980, and becoming head coach of his former club Fiorentina later that year, narrowly missing out on the league title to rivals Juventus in 1982. He was forced to leave his job in 1985 after being diagnosed with brain abscess. He returned to football with Udinese later that year, for two seasons, and then entered into the Italian Football Federation as head coach of the Italian Juniores (1988–90) and Military squads (1990–91), winning a Military World Championship with the Italian Military side in 1991. He made a return to club football later that year, with Ascoli, being successively sacked in January 1992.

In March 2003 – after over a decade of inactivity – De Sisti returned into coaching, joining Lazio as youth team coach. He left the job only a few months later, following the appointment of Roberto Mancini as new head coach of the biancazzurri.

== Style of play ==
During his career, De Sisti played as a creative and technically skilled deep-lying playmaking midfielder. He is regarded as one of Italy's and Roma's notable playmakers. His playing style was characterised by simple and efficient ball distribution, frequent movement into open spaces, short passes along the ground, and a limited number of touches. He was also noted for his composure under pressure and consistency in possession, rarely misplacing passes or losing the ball. His vision and long-passing ability enabled him to create scoring opportunities through lobbed passes and through balls to teammates.

== Outside of football ==
On 3 July 1968, De Sisti founded the Italian Footballers' Association (AIC), in Milan, along with several fellow footballers, such as Giacomo Bulgarelli, Sandro Mazzola, Ernesto Castano, Gianni Rivera, and Giacomo Losi, as well as the recently retired Sergio Campana, also a lawyer, who was appointed president of the association.

De Sisti also later worked as a television and radio football pundit.

== Career statistics ==
=== Club ===
| Season | Team | League | | | Cup | | | Continental | | | Other | | | Total | |
| Season | Team | Tournament | Apps | Goals | Tournament | Apps | Goals | Tournament | Apps | Goals | Tournament | Apps | Goals | Apps | Goals |
|---|---|---|---|---|---|---|---|---|---|---|---|---|---|---|---|
| 1960–61 | A.S. Roma | A | 2 | 0 | CI | 1 | 1 | CdF | 1 | 0 | - | - | - | 4 | 1 |
| 1961–62 | A.S. Roma | A | 11 | 1 | CI | 1 | 0 | CdF | 1 | 0 | - | - | - | 13 | 1 |
| 1962–63 | A.S. Roma | A | 18 | 2 | CI | 0 | 0 | CdF | 5 | 1 | - | - | - | 23 | 3 |
| 1963–64 | A.S. Roma | A | 28 | 7 | CI | 4 | 0 | CdF | 4 | 2 | CdA | 1 | 0 | 37 | 9 |
| 1964–65 | A.S. Roma | A | 28 | 3 | CI | 1 | 1 | CdF | 5 | 1 | - | - | - | 34 | 5 |
| 1965–66 | Fiorentina | A | 34 | 5 | CI | 6 | 0 | CdF | 3 | 1 | CM | 2 | 0 | 45 | 6 |
| 1966–67 | Fiorentina | A | 30 | 6 | CI | 1 | 0 | CdC | 2 | 1 | CM | 4 | 0 | 37 | 7 |
| 1967–68 | Fiorentina | A | 30 | 6 | CI | 2 | 0 | CdF | 4 | 1 | - | - | - | 36 | 7 |
| 1968–69 | Fiorentina | A | 30 | 2 | CI | 3 | 0 | CdF | 6 | 0 | - | - | - | 39 | 2 |
| 1969–70 | Fiorentina | A | 27 | 2 | CI | 6 | 1 | CC | 6 | 0 | - | - | - | 39 | 3 |
| 1970–71 | Fiorentina | A | 29 | 3 | CI | 11 | 3 | CdF | 4 | 0 | - | - | - | 44 | 6 |
| 1971–72 | Fiorentina | A | 29 | 1 | CI | 10 | 2 | - | - | - | CM | 6 | 0 | 45 | 3 |
| 1972–73 | Fiorentina | A | 27 | 1 | CI | 4 | 2 | CU | 1 | 0 | CA-I | 7 | 1 | 39 | 4 |
| 1973–74 | Fiorentina | A | 19 | 2 | CI | 3 | 1 | CU | 2 | 0 | - | - | - | 24 | 3 |
| Totale Fiorentina | | | 256 | 28 | | 46 | 9 | | 22 | 3 | | 19 | 1 | 348 | 41 |
| 1974–75 | A.S. Roma | A | 29 | 5 | CI | 10 | 0 | - | - | - | - | - | - | 39 | 5 |
| 1975–76 | A.S. Roma | A | 28 | 2 | CI | 4 | 0 | CU | 6 | 0 | - | - | - | 38 | 2 |
| 1976–77 | A.S. Roma | A | 28 | 2 | CI | 4 | 1 | - | - | - | - | - | - | 32 | 3 |
| 1977–78 | A.S. Roma | A | 25 | 0 | CI | 4 | 0 | - | - | - | - | - | - | 29 | 0 |
| 1978–79 | A.S. Roma | A | 25 | 0 | CI | 4 | 0 | - | - | - | - | - | - | 29 | 0 |
| Totale Roma | | | 222 | 22 | | 33 | 3 | | 22 | 4 | | 1 | 0 | 278 | 29 |
| Totale carriera | | | 478 | 50 | | 79 | 12 | | 44 | 7 | | 20 | 1 | 626 | 70 |

== Honours ==
=== Club ===
Roma

- Inter-Cities Fairs Cup: 1960–61
- Coppa Italia: 1963–64

Fiorentina

- Serie A: 1968–69
- Coppa Italia: 1965–66
- Mitropa Cup: 1966

=== International ===
Italy

- UEFA European Championship: 1968
- FIFA World Cup Runner up: 1970

=== Individual ===
- ACF Fiorentina Hall of Fame: 2013
- A.S. Roma Hall of Fame: 2016
