= Kurt Leitner =

Austrian footballer (1946–2018)

Personal information
- Date of birth: 21 March 1946
- Place of birth: Schwarzach im Pongau, Austria
- Date of death: 7 October 2018 (aged 72)
- Position: Forward

Senior career*
Years	Team	Apps	(Gls)
1966–1968	Wiener Sport-Club	36	(13)
1968–1975	LASK	153	(76)
1975	Austria WAC Wien	32	(7)
- FC Dornbirn 1913

International career
1971	Austria	1	(0)

Managerial career
- 1979–1980: First Vienna
- 1980–1981: SV Rapid Lienz
- 1984: Zwettl
- 1996: Zwettl
- * Club domestic league appearances and goals

Kurt Leitner (21 March 1946 – 7 October 2018) was an Austrian football player and manager who played as a forward. He made one appearance for the Austria national team in 1971.
