= Giuseppe Koschier =

Austrian footballer

Personal information
- Date of birth: 16 March 1936
- Place of birth: Austria
- Date of death: 24 December 2021 (aged 85)
- Place of death: Vienna, Austria
- Position: Midfielder

Senior career*
| Years | Team | Apps | (Gls) |
- 1. Simmeringer SC

International career
| 1960 | Austria | 2 | (0) |
- * Club domestic league appearances and goals

Giuseppe Francesco Carlo Koschier (16 March 1936 – 24 December 2021) was an Austriafootball midfielder who played for Austria in the 1960 European Nations' Cup. He also played for 1. Simmeringer SC.
