= Herwig Kircher =

Austrian footballer

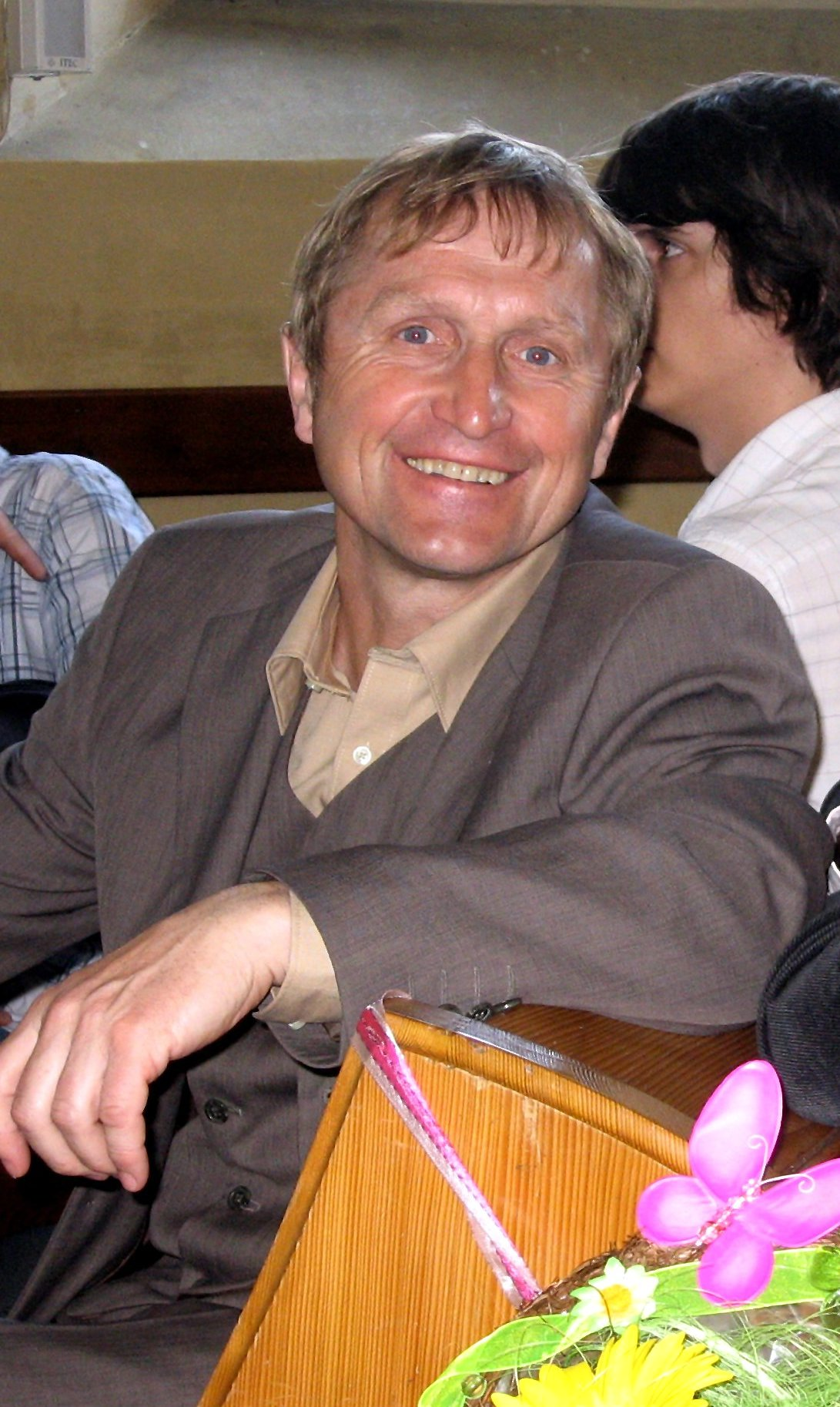

Personal information
- Date of birth: 18 March 1955 (age 71)
- Place of birth: Villach, Austria
- Position: Midfielder

Senior career*
Years	Team	Apps	(Gls)
1972–1978	VÖEST Linz		
1978–1979	SV Austria Salzburg		
1979–1981	Stade Lavallois		
1981–1982	SSW Innsbruck		
1982–1983	Austria Klagenfurt		
1983–1985	SV Spittal/Drau		

International career
1974–1975	Austria	2	(0)
- * Club domestic league appearances and goals

Herwig Kircher (born 18 March 1955) is a former Austrian footballer. Kircher retired from football in June 1986 after playing for his final club SV Spittal/Drau for over two years (January 1984- June 1986).
