= Rudolf Oslansky =

Austrian footballer

Personal information
- Date of birth: 23 May 1931
- Date of death: 4 October 2012 (aged 81)
- Position: Midfielder

Senior career*
Years	Team	Apps	(Gls)
1951–1956	FC Wien	113	(1)
1956–1965	Wiener Sport-Club	212	(6)
1965–1967	Kremser SC		

International career
1958–1963	Austria	12	(1)
- * Club domestic league appearances and goals

Rudolf Oslansky (23 May 1931 – 4 October 2012) was an Austrian international footballer.
