= Erich Hasenkopf =

Austrian footballer (1935–2021)

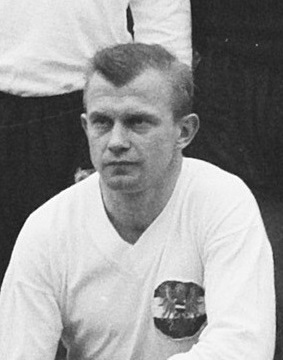
- Hasenkopf in 1964

Personal information
- Date of birth: 20 February 1935
- Place of birth: Vienna, Austria
- Date of death: 7 July 2021 (aged 86)
- Place of death: Vienna, Austria
- Position: Defender

Senior career*
Years	Team	Apps	(Gls)
- Wiener Sport-Club

International career
	Austria	31	(0)
- * Club domestic league appearances and goals

Erich Hasenkopf (20 February 1935 – 7 July 2021) was an Austrian football defender who played for Austria in the 1960 European Nations' Cup. He also played for Wiener Sport-Club.
