= Karl Kodat =

Austrian footballer

Personal information
- Date of birth: 10 February 1943
- Place of birth: Vienna, Austria
- Date of death: 29 February 2012 (aged 69)
- Position: Striker

Senior career*
Years	Team	Apps	(Gls)
1964–1967	Austria Wien	27	(7)
1967–1971	Austria Salzburg		
1971–1977	Royal Antwerp	157	(65)
Total		184	(72)

International career
1971	Austria	5	(1)
- * Club domestic league appearances and goals

Karl Kodat (10 February 1943 – 29 February 2012) was an Austrian footballer who played at both professional and international levels, as a striker.

== Career ==
Born on 10 February 1943 in Vienna, Kodat played at professional level in Austria and Belgium for Austria Wien, Austria Salzburg and Royal Antwerp.

He also earned five caps for Austria in 1971.

== Later life and death ==
Kodat died on 29 February 2012, aged 69.
