= Horst Nemec =

Austrian footballer

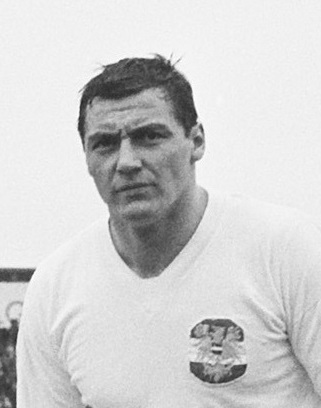
- Horst Nemec in 1964

Personal information
- Date of birth: 25 January 1939
- Place of birth: Austria
- Date of death: 23 June 1984 (aged 45)
- Position: Forward

Youth career
- Rudolfsheimer AC

Senior career*
Years	Team	Apps	(Gls)
1956–1958	SC Helfort Wien		
1958–1966	FK Austria Wien	185	(132)
1966–1969	First Vienna FC	35	(12)

International career
1959–1966	Austria	29	(16)
- * Club domestic league appearances and goals

Horst Nemec (25 January 1939 – 23 June 1984) was an Austrian football forward who played for Austria in the 1960 European Nations' Cup. He also played for FK Austria Wien.
