= Wilhelm Kreuz =

Austrian footballer (born 1949)

Willi Kreuz
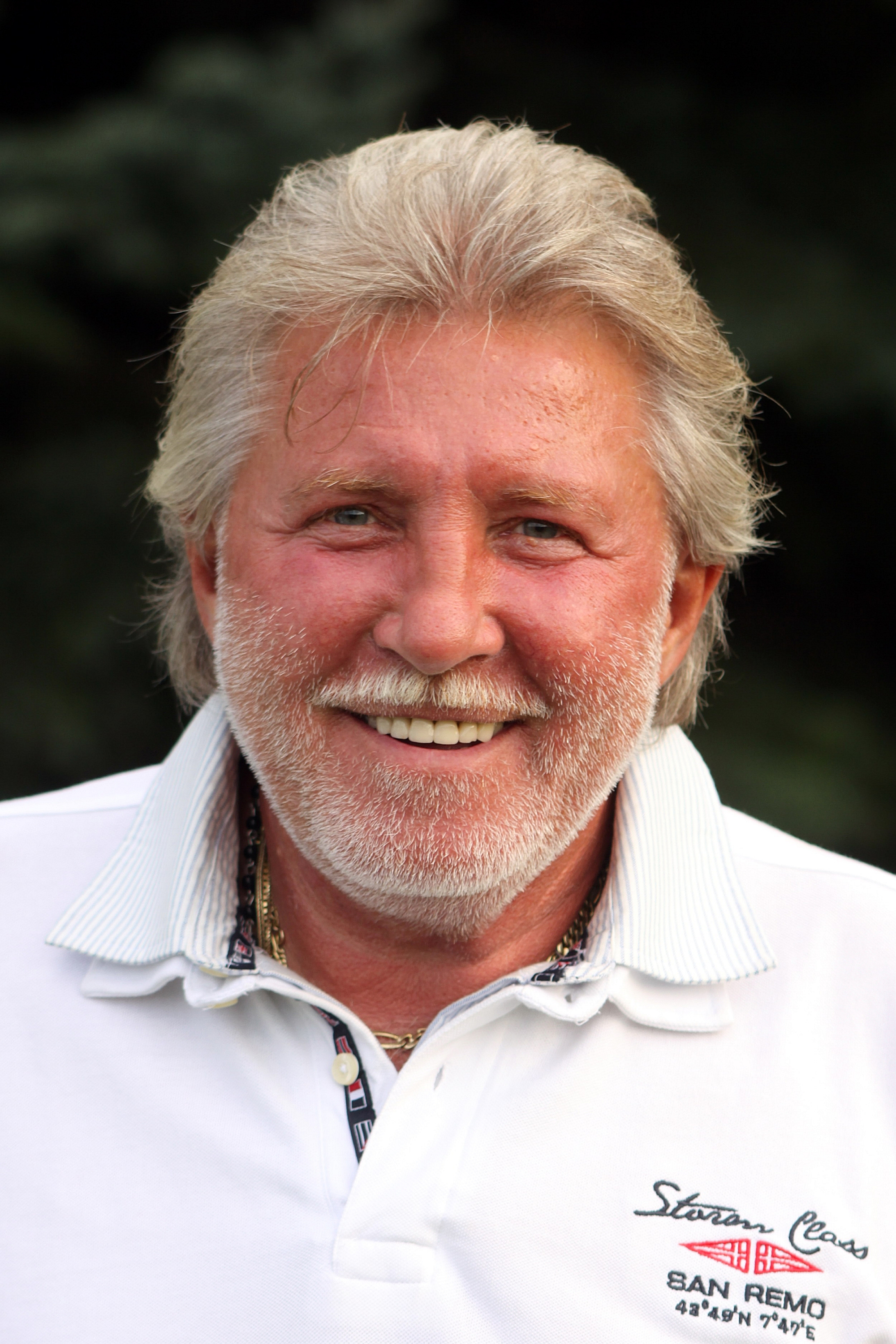

Personal information
- Date of birth: 29 May 1949 (age 77)
- Place of birth: Vienna, Austria
- Height: 1.76 m (5 ft 9 in)
- Position: Striker

Youth career
- 1956–1962: SV Donau
- 1962–1966: Admira Wacker

Senior career*
Years	Team	Apps	(Gls)
1966–1972	Admira Wacker	147	(69)
1972–1974	Sparta	65	(22)
1974–1978	Feyenoord	132	(58)
1978–1982	SK VÖEST Linz	115	(37)
Total		459	(186)

International career
1969–1981	Austria	56	(12)

Managerial career
- 1986–1987: Admira Wacker (assistant)
- 1987–1988: Admira Wacker
- 1988–1990: SK VÖEST Linz
- 1990–1993: SV Stockerau
- 1993–1994: FC ÖMV Stadlau
- 1994–1995: VSE Sankt Pölten
- 2006–2007: SV Donau
- * Club domestic league appearances and goals

Wilhelm Kreuz (born 29 May 1949), nicknamed "Willy" or "Willi", is a former Austrian footballer.

== Club career ==
During his club career he played for Admira Energie (1966–1972), Sparta Rotterdam (1972–1974), Feyenoord Rotterdam (1974–1978), and SK VÖEST Linz (1978–1982).

He is placed as 76th best Feyenoord player ever in the book "De Top en Flop 100".

== International career ==
He made his debut for Austria in an April 1969 World Cup qualification match against Cyprus and was a participant at the 1978 FIFA World Cup. He earned 56 caps, scoring 12 goals. His last international was a June 1981 World Cup qualification match against Finland.

== Honours ==
=== Playing ===
- Austrian Bundesliga top goalscorer (1):
  - 1971

=== Coaching ===
- Austrian Cup (1):
  - 1991
