= Roland Eschelmüller =

Austrian footballer

Personal information
- Date of birth: 6 October 1943 (age 83)
- Place of birth: Bad Hall, Austria
- Position: Midfielder

International career
| Years | Team | Apps | (Gls) |
| 1967 | Austria | 2 | (0) |

Roland Eschelmüller (born 6 October 1943) is an Austrian footballer. He played in two matches for the Austria national football team in 1967.
