= Werner Kriess =

Austrian footballer (born 1947)

Personal information
- Date of birth: 6 September 1947 (age 79)
- Place of birth: Klagenfurt, Austria
- Position: Defender

Senior career*
| Years | Team | Apps | (Gls) |
- First Vienna FC
- SSW Innsbruck

International career
| 1971–1975 | Austria | 15 | (0) |

Managerial career
- 1980–1983: Bregenz/Dornbirn
- 1983–1984: Blau-Weiß Linz
- * Club domestic league appearances and goals

Werner Kriess (born 6 September 1947) is an Austrian former football player and manager who played as a defender. He made 15 appearances for the Austria national team from 1971 to 1975.
