= Erich Hof =

Austrian footballer (1936–1995)

Personal information
- Date of birth: 3 August 1936
- Place of birth: Vienna, Austria
- Date of death: 25 January 1995 (aged 58)
- Place of death: Vienna, Austria
- Position: Forward

Senior career*
Years	Team	Apps	(Gls)
1951–1952	SCR Hochstädt		
1952–1964	Wiener Sport-Club	209	(177)
1964–1965	Austria Wien	5	(1)
1964–1969	Wiener Sport-Club	93	(44)
Total		307	(222)

International career
1957–1968	Austria	37	(28)

Managerial career
- 1969–1970: Wiener Sport-Club
- 1971: Austria Salzburg
- 1974–1979: Wiener Sport-Club
- 1980–1982: Austria Wien
- 1982–1984: Austria
- 1985–1986: Wiener Sport-Club
- 1987: Diagoras
- 1989–1990: Austria Wien
- * Club domestic league appearances and goals

Erich Hof (3 August 1936 – 25 January 1995) was an Austrian football player and coach who played as a forward.

== Career ==
Born in the Brigittenau district of Vienna, Hof began playing football as a striker with FC Hochstädt. In 1952, he joined Wiener Sport-Club, where he would play until 1969, with the exception of a brief stint with Austria Wien in 1964. He led the Austrian league in goal-scoring in 1959 and 1961 with 32 and 21 goals respectively. Hof was a leading Austrian footballer in the 1960s and was known as "The Professor of Football" (Der Professor des Fußballs).

Hof made 37 appearances and scored 28 goals for the Austria national team from 1957 to 1968. He made his debut in a friendly match against West Germany on 10 March 1957.

== Career statistics ==
=== International ===
Scores and results list Austria's goal tally first, score column indicates score after each Hof goal.

List of international goals scored by Erich Hof
No.	Date	Venue	Opponent	Score	Result	Competition	Ref.
1	5 October 1958	Praterstadion, Vienna, Austria	France	1–0	1–2	Friendly	
2	20 May 1959	Ullevaal Stadion, Oslo, Norway	Norway	1–0	1–0	1960 European Nations' Cup qualification	
3	14 June 1959	Praterstadion, Vienna, Austria	Belgium	2–2	4–2	Friendly	
4	14 June 1959	Praterstadion, Vienna, Austria	Belgium	3–2	4–2	Friendly	
5	23 September 1959	Praterstadion, Vienna, Austria	Norway	3–1	5–2	1960 European Nations' Cup qualification	
6	23 September 1959	Praterstadion, Vienna, Austria	Norway	5–2	5–2	1960 European Nations' Cup qualification	
7	22 November 1959	Mestalla Stadium, Valencia, Spain	Spain	1–3	3–6	Friendly	
8	29 May 1960	Praterstadion, Vienna, Austria	Scotland	–	4–1	Friendly	
9	29 May 1960	Praterstadion, Vienna, Austria	Scotland	–	4–1	Friendly	
10	22 June 1960	Ullevaal Stadion, Oslo, Norway	Norway	–	2–1	Friendly	
11	4 September 1960	Praterstadion, Vienna, Austria	Soviet Union	1–1	3–1	Friendly	
12	4 September 1960	Praterstadion, Vienna, Austria	Soviet Union	3–1	3–1	Friendly	
13	30 October 1960	Praterstadion, Vienna, Austria	Spain	3–0	3–0	Friendly	
14	10 December 1960	Stadio San Paolo, Naples, Italy	Italy	1–0	2–1	Friendly	
15	27 May 1961	Praterstadion, Vienna, Austria	England	1–0	3–1	Friendly	
16	8 October 1961	Praterstadion, Vienna, Austria	Hungary	–	2–1	Friendly	
17	8 April 1962	Dalymount Park, Dublin, Ireland	Republic of Ireland	3–2	3–2	Friendly	
18	6 May 1962	Praterstadion, Vienna, Austria	Bulgaria	–	2–0	Friendly	
19	25 April 1965	Praterstadion, Vienna, Austria	East Germany	1–0	1–1	1966 FIFA World Cup qualification	
20	11 June 1967	Central Lenin Stadium, Moscow, Russia	Soviet Union	1–2	3–4	UEFA Euro 1968 qualification	
21	6 September 1967	Praterstadion, Vienna, Austria	Hungary	–	1–3	Friendly	
22	19 May 1968	Praterstadion, Vienna, Austria	Cyprus	1–0	7–1	1970 FIFA World Cup qualification	
23	19 May 1968	Praterstadion, Vienna, Austria	Cyprus	3–0	7–1	1970 FIFA World Cup qualification	
24	19 May 1968	Praterstadion, Vienna, Austria	Cyprus	4–1	7–1	1970 FIFA World Cup qualification	
25	19 May 1968	Praterstadion, Vienna, Austria	Cyprus	5–1	7–1	1970 FIFA World Cup qualification	
26	19 May 1968	Praterstadion, Vienna, Austria	Cyprus	7–1	7–1	1970 FIFA World Cup qualification	
27	16 June 1968	Kirov Stadium, Saint Petersburg, Russia	Soviet Union	–	3–1	Friendly	
28	10 November 1968	Dalymount Park, Dublin, Ireland	Republic of Ireland	2–0	2–2	Friendly	

== Personal life ==
Hof died from lung cancer in a Vienna hospital on 25 January 1995.

He was the brother of retired footballer Norbert Hof.
