= Helmut Siber =

Austrian footballer (1942–2023)

Personal information
- Date of birth: 16 May 1942
- Date of death: 5 August 2023 (aged 81)
- Height: 1.83 m (6 ft 0 in)
- Position: Forward

Youth career
- 1953–: SV Hall

Senior career*
Years	Team	Apps	(Gls)
–1964	SV Hall		
1964–1969	FC Wacker Innsbruck	97	(33)
1969–1970	Kickers Offenbach	31	(4)
1970–1971	WSG Wattens	42	(10)
1971–1972	DSV Alpine Donawitz	22	(11)
1972–1973	FC Wacker Innsbruck	3	(0)
1973–1974	FC Dornbirn		
1974–1984	SV Hall		

International career
1967–1969	Austria	11	(4)

Managerial career
- 1974–1984: SV Hall
- 1984–1985: SV Absam
- 1992–1996: SV Hall
- * Club domestic league appearances and goals

Helmut Siber (16 May 1942 – 5 August 2023) was an Austrian football player and coach. At international level, he made eleven appearances for the Austria national team scoring four goals.

Siber died on 5 August 2023, at the age of 81.
