= Josef Stering =

Austrian footballer

Personal information
- Date of birth: 6 March 1949 (age 77)
- Place of birth: Köflach, Austria
- Height: 1.69 m (5 ft 6 1/2 in)
- Position: Midfielder

Youth career
- ASK Voitsberg

Senior career*
| Years | Team | Apps | (Gls) |
| –1968 | ASK Voitsberg | | |
| 1968–1972 | Grazer AK | 112 | (25) |
| 1972–1976 | SK VÖEST Linz | 109 | (35) |
| 1975–1978 | SSW Wacker Innsbruck | 60 | (11) |
| 1978–1980 | TSV 1860 München | 61 | (5) |
| 1980–1986 | Grazer AK | 184 | (20) |

International career
| 1969–1977 | Austria | 26 | (5) |
- * Club domestic league appearances and goals

Josef "Sepp" Stering (born 6 March 1949) is an Austrian retired footballer.
