= Hans Schmidradner =

Austrian footballer

Personal information
- Full name: Johann Schmidradner
- Date of birth: 26 February 1945
- Place of birth: Austria
- Position: Defender

Senior career*
Years	Team	Apps	(Gls)
1962–1963	SC Wacker Wien		
1963–1966	FK Austria Wien		
1966–1968	First Vienna FC	35	(3)
1968–1971	Wiener Sport-Club	81	(4)
1971–1976	Kickers Offenbach	126	(11)
1976–1977	FV Würzburg 04	19	(0)
1977–1978	Linzer ASK	20	(0)

International career
1969–1974	Austria	28	(1)
- * Club domestic league appearances and goals

Johann "Hans" Schmidradner (born 26 February 1945) is a retired Austrian football defender who played for Austria. He also played for SC Wacker Wien, FK Austria Wien, First Vienna FC, Kickers Offenbach, FV Würzburg 04, Linzer ASK and Wiener Sport-Club.

== International ==
Appearances and goals by national team and year
National team	Year	Apps	Goals
Austria	1969	2	0
Austria	1970	6	0
Austria	1971	7	1
Austria	1972	5	0
Austria	1973	7	0
Austria	1974	1	0
Total		28	1

Johann Schmidradner at eu-football.info
