= List of Austria international footballers (1–24 caps) =

List of Austrian footballers

This is a list of Austria international footballers – football players who have played in one to 24 matches for the Austria national football team.

| Name | Caps | Goals | First match | Last match |
|---|---|---|---|---|
| Karl Achatzy | 2 | 0 | 1914 | 1914 |
| Karl Adamek | 8 | 0 | 1932 | 1937 |
| Josef Adelbrecht | 3 | 1 | 1930 | 1933 |
| Ernst Aigner | 11 | 0 | 1989 | 1990 |
| Franz Aigner | 6 | 1 | 1994 | 1997 |
| Rudolf Aigner | 13 | 0 | 1924 | 1926 |
| Muhammet Akagündüz | 10 | 1 | 2002 | 2007 |
| Martin Amerhauser | 12 | 3 | 1998 | 2005 |
| Johann Andres | 6 | 2 | 1908 | 1912 |
| Karl Andritz | 3 | 0 | 1936 | 1937 |
| Adolf Antrich | 2 | 0 | 1971 | 1971 |
| Heinz Arzberger | 1 | 0 | 2004 | 2004 |
| Cem Atan | 2 | 0 | 2007 | 2007 |
| Lukas Aurednik | 14 | 2 | 1948 | 1950 |
| Johann Baar | 1 | 0 | 1920 | 1920 |
| Franz Bacher | 1 | 0 | 1974 | 1974 |
| Zoran Barisic | 1 | 0 | 1999 | 1999 |
| Leopold Barschandt | 23 | 0 | 1954 | 1960 |
| Edi Bauer | 23 | 13 | 1912 | 1921 |
| Christoph Baumgartner | 14 | 4 | 2020 | 2021 |
| Franz Baumgartner | 1 | 0 | 1924 | 1924 |
| Hubert Baumgartner | 1 | 0 | 1978 | 1978 |
| Karl Beck | 9 | 0 | 1907 | 1918 |
| Richard Beer | 11 | 0 | 1920 | 1925 |
| Daniel Beichler | 5 | 0 | 2009 | 2010 |
| Josef Bertalan | 1 | 0 | 1960 | 1960 |
| Josef Bican | 19 | 14 | 1933 | 1937 |
| August Bichler | 1 | 0 | 1947 | 1947 |
| Franz Biegler | 1 | 0 | 1918 | 1918 |
| Heinrich Belohlavek | 1 | 0 | 1910 | 1910 |
| Anton Bilek | 2 | 0 | 1927 | 1928 |
| Franz Binder | 19 | 16 | 1933 | 1947 |
| Heinz Binder | 9 | 0 | 1964 | 1966 |
| Gustav Blaha | 1 | 0 | 1912 | 1912 |
| Dominik Blässy | 1 | 0 | 1902 | 1902 |
| Leopold Bode | 2 | 0 | 1914 | 1914 |
| Karl Bortoli | 7 | 0 | 1945 | 1947 |
| Fritz Brandstätter | 1 | 0 | 1912 | 1912 |
| Johann Brandweiner | 2 | 0 | 1919 | 1919 |
| Georg Braun | 13 | 1 | 1928 | 1935 |
| Karl Brauneder | 19 | 1 | 1982 | 1988 |
| Karl Braunsteiner | 8 | 0 | 1912 | 1914 |
| Erwin Brazda | 1 | 0 | 1922 | 1922 |
| Michael Breibert | 2 | 0 | 1966 | 1966 |
| Gerhard Breitenberger | 15 | 0 | 1976 | 1978 |
| Theodor Brinek | 1 | 0 | 1927 | 1927 |
| Theodor Brinek | 17 | 2 | 1946 | 1953 |
| Anton Brosenbauer | 4 | 0 | 1930 | 1933 |
| Ludwig Brousek | 1 | 0 | 1935 | 1935 |
| Richard Brousek | 4 | 1 | 1955 | 1955 |
| Ronald Brunmayr | 8 | 1 | 2000 | 2003 |
| Josef Bugala | 2 | 0 | 1930 | 1931 |
| Richard Bugno | 1 | 1 | 1904 | 1904 |
| Heinrich Büllwatsch | 2 | 0 | 1958 | 1959 |
| Patrick Bürger | 2 | 0 | 2012 | 2012 |
| Tony Cargnelli | 1 | 0 | 1909 | 1909 |
| Karl Cart | 2 | 0 | 1926 | 1928 |
| Fritz Cejka | 1 | 1 | 1952 | 1952 |
| Rudolf Cejka | 1 | 0 | 1965 | 1965 |
| Wilhelm Cerny | 2 | 0 | 1976 | 1976 |
| Josef Chloupek | 2 | 0 | 1928 | 1931 |
| Gustav Chrenka | 6 | 0 | 1914 | 1924 |
| Robert Cimera | 10 | 1 | 1908 | 1915 |
| Franz Cisar | 9 | 0 | 1933 | 1934 |
| Peter Clement | 2 | 0 | 1970 | 1970 |
| Leopold Czejka | 2 | 0 | 1930 | 1931 |
| Franz Czernicky | 1 | 0 | 1927 | 1927 |
| Ekrem Dağ | 10 | 0 | 2010 | 2011 |
| Leopold Danis | 3 | 1 | 1924 | 1924 |
| Karl Daxbacher | 6 | 0 | 1972 | 1976 |
| Johannes Demantke | 4 | 0 | 1970 | 1976 |
| Anton Desnohlidek | 2 | 0 | 1915 | 1915 |
| Friedrich Dettelmaier | 3 | 0 | 1903 | 1904 |
| Gustav Deutsch | 1 | 0 | 1916 | 1916 |
| Josef Deutsch | 3 | 0 | 1916 | 1919 |
| Christopher Dibon | 1 | 1 | 2011 | 2011 |
| Johann Dick | 2 | 0 | 1903 | 1904 |
| Johann Dihanich | 10 | 0 | 1980 | 1984 |
| Alfons Dirnberger | 3 | 0 | 1965 | 1966 |
| Vinzenz Dittrich | 16 | 1 | 1913 | 1923 |
| Ladislaus Dlabac | 2 | 1 | 1908 | 1908 |
| Andreas Dober | 3 | 0 | 2005 | 2006 |
| Matthias Dollinger | 7 | 0 | 2002 | 2005 |
| Rudolf Donhardt | 1 | 0 | 1908 | 1908 |
| Friedrich Donenfeld | 1 | 0 | 1934 | 1934 |
| Ernst Dospel | 19 | 0 | 2000 | 2005 |
| Alfred Drabits | 7 | 0 | 1984 | 1987 |
| Christopher Drazan | 3 | 0 | 2009 | 2011 |
| Franz Drexler | 1 | 0 | 1910 | 1910 |
| Leopold Drucker | 1 | 0 | 1932 | 1932 |
| Franz Dumser | 2 | 1 | 1925 | 1926 |
| Fritz Dünmann | 3 | 2 | 1926 | 1927 |
| Ludwig Durek | 2 | 0 | 1945 | 1945 |
| Karl Dürschmied | 1 | 0 | 1926 | 1926 |
| Karl Durspekt | 2 | 1 | 1935 | 1935 |
| Franz Eckl | 7 | 1 | 1919 | 1928 |
| Hannes Eder | 2 | 0 | 2006 | 2006 |
| Thomas Eder | 1 | 0 | 2003 | 2003 |
| Anton Ehmann | 13 | 0 | 2002 | 2005 |
| Johann Ehrlich | 3 | 1 | 1915 | 1917 |
| Kurt Eigenstiller | 1 | 0 | 1954 | 1954 |
| Wilhelm Eipeldauer | 4 | 0 | 1902 | 1908 |
| Alfred Eisele | 2 | 0 | 1969 | 1969 |
| Bruno Engelmeier | 10 | 0 | 1949 | 1958 |
| Eduard Engel | 1 | 0 | 1906 | 1906 |
| Karl Engel | 1 | 0 | 1906 | 1906 |
| Josef Epp | 8 | 5 | 1946 | 1948 |
| Franz Ertl | 3 | 1 | 1933 | 1936 |
| Johannes Ertl | 7 | 0 | 2006 | 2007 |
| Roland Eschelmüller | 2 | 0 | 1967 | 1967 |
| Leopold Facco | 2 | 0 | 1930 | 1931 |
| Erich Fak | 13 | 0 | 1967 | 1971 |
| Ferdinand Feigl | 2 | 0 | 1916 | 1925 |
| Ferdinand Feldhofer | 13 | 1 | 2002 | 2007 |
| Karl Feldmüller | 1 | 0 | 1904 | 1904 |
| Karl Feller | 2 | 0 | 1918 | 1918 |
| Robert Fendler | 1 | 0 | 1972 | 1972 |
| Herbert Feurer | 7 | 0 | 1980 | 1982 |
| Ernst Fiala | 15 | 0 | 1962 | 1968 |
| Franz Fichta | 1 | 0 | 1917 | 1917 |
| Josef Fischer | 5 | 0 | 1903 | 1910 |
| Oskar Fischer | 1 | 0 | 1956 | 1956 |
| Otto Fischer | 7 | 0 | 1923 | 1928 |
| Richard Fischer | 3 | 0 | 1937 | 1945 |
| Adolf Fischera | 15 | 8 | 1908 | 1923 |
| Paul Fischl | 3 | 0 | 1908 | 1910 |
| Gerhard Fleischmann | 1 | 0 | 1976 | 1976 |
| Ernst Foreth | 3 | 0 | 1965 | 1965 |
| Johann Frank | 7 | 0 | 1963 | 1967 |
| Friederich Franzl | 15 | 0 | 1926 | 1931 |
| Richard Fried | 1 | 0 | 1924 | 1924 |
| Robert Frind | 5 | 0 | 1987 | 1988 |
| Ferdinand Frithum | 1 | 0 | 1919 | 1919 |
| Toni Fritsch | 9 | 2 | 1965 | 1968 |
| Karl Fröhlich | 8 | 0 | 1966 | 1968 |
| Josef Frühwirth | 1 | 0 | 1928 | 1928 |
| Otto Fuchs | 3 | 0 | 1920 | 1921 |
| Franz Fuchsberger | 1 | 0 | 1936 | 1936 |
| Erwin Fuchsbichler | 4 | 0 | 1978 | 1978 |
| Gerald Fuchsbichler | 6 | 0 | 1967 | 1972 |
| Christian Fürstaller | 5 | 0 | 1994 | 1995 |
| Alfred Gager | 6 | 0 | 1962 | 1963 |
| Herbert Gager | 4 | 0 | 1991 | 1992 |
| Karl Gall | 11 | 0 | 1931 | 1936 |
| Geza Gallos | 6 | 0 | 1971 | 1974 |
| Kurt Garger | 1 | 0 | 1991 | 1991 |
| Felix Gasselich | 19 | 3 | 1978 | 1984 |
| Alfred Gassner | 3 | 0 | 1971 | 1976 |
| Walter Gebhardt | 17 | 0 | 1966 | 1969 |
| Rudolf Geiter | 7 | 2 | 1936 | 1937 |
| Ronald Gërçaliu | 14 | 0 | 2005 | 2008 |
| Gustav Gerhart | 4 | 0 | 1945 | 1949 |
| Johann Geyer | 9 | 0 | 1962 | 1971 |
| Karl Geyer | 17 | 0 | 1921 | 1928 |
| Leopold Giebisch | 4 | 1 | 1927 | 1929 |
| Karl Giesser | 4 | 0 | 1954 | 1961 |
| Martin Gisinger | 7 | 2 | 1983 | 1985 |
| Gerald Glatzmayer | 6 | 1 | 1988 | 1990 |
| Eduard Glieder | 11 | 4 | 1998 | 2004 |
| Günther Golautschnig | 1 | 0 | 1982 | 1982 |
| Maximilian Gold | 2 | 0 | 1922 | 1922 |
| Otto Gollnhuber | 4 | 0 | 1953 | 1954 |
| Franz Golobic | 3 | 0 | 1953 | 1953 |
| Manfred Gombasch | 4 | 0 | 1973 | 1975 |
| Roland Goriupp | 1 | 0 | 2002 | 2002 |
| Karl Graf | 2 | 0 | 1928 | 1932 |
| Christian Gratzei | 10 | 0 | 2009 | 2012 |
| Bernhard Graubart | 5 | 0 | 2012 | 2012 |
| Leopold Grausam | 8 | 3 | 1964 | 1967 |
| Andreas Gretschnig | 2 | 0 | 1984 | 1986 |
| Leopold Grimme | 1 | 0 | 1946 | 1946 |
| Herbert Grohs | 7 | 2 | 1955 | 1957 |
| Karl Groß | 3 | 0 | 1907 | 1909 |
| Siegfried Großmann | 1 | 0 | 1905 | 1905 |
| Leopold Grundwald | 8 | 3 | 1912 | 1916 |
| Max Grünwald | 1 | 2 | 1924 | 1924 |
| Pascal Grünwald | 3 | 0 | 2011 | 2011 |
| Harald Gschnaidtner | 1 | 0 | 1991 | 1991 |
| Michael Gspurning | 3 | 0 | 2008 | 2009 |
| Erich Habitzl | 11 | 5 | 1948 | 1951 |
| Otto Haftl | 3 | 2 | 1925 | 1929 |
| Josef Hagler | 1 | 0 | 1912 | 1912 |
| Max Hagmayr | 9 | 1 | 1979 | 1982 |
| Wilhelm Hahnemann | 23 | 4 | 1935 | 1948 |
| Gerald Haider | 1 | 0 | 1976 | 1976 |
| Josef Haist | 5 | 0 | 1914 | 1917 |
| Wilhelm Halpern | 3 | 0 | 1917 | 1918 |
| Josef Hamerl | 9 | 2 | 1958 | 1962 |
| Rudolf Hanel | 2 | 2 | 1926 | 1926 |
| Franz Hanreiter | 5 | 2 | 1935 | 1936 |
| Franz Hansl | 4 | 3 | 1919 | 1922 |
| Günther Happich | 5 | 0 | 1978 | 1978 |
| Karl Harmer | 1 | 0 | 1907 | 1907 |
| Wilhelm Harreither | 13 | 0 | 1967 | 1970 |
| Jürgen Hartmann | 8 | 0 | 1990 | 1992 |
| Ralph Hasenhüttl | 8 | 3 | 1988 | 1994 |
| Franz Hasil | 21 | 2 | 1963 | 1974 |
| Josef Hassmann | 2 | 0 | 1934 | 1935 |
| Michael Hatz | 9 | 0 | 1996 | 2000 |
| Walter Haummer | 16 | 4 | 1952 | 1957 |
| Moritz Häusler | 7 | 2 | 1923 | 1925 |
| Viktor Havlicek | 3 | 0 | 1935 | 1936 |
| Albert Heikenwälder | 1 | 0 | 1923 | 1923 |
| Karl Heinlein | 2 | 0 | 1917 | 1919 |
| Franz Heinzl | 7 | 4 | 1914 | 1917 |
| Georg Heiß | 1 | 0 | 1914 | 1914 |
| Leopold Henzl | 1 | 0 | 1931 | 1931 |
| Andreas Heraf | 11 | 1 | 1996 | 1998 |
| Thomas Hickersberger | 1 | 0 | 2002 | 2002 |
| Markus Hiden | 5 | 0 | 2001 | 2002 |
| Rudi Hiden | 20 | 0 | 1928 | 1933 |
| Mario Hieblinger | 12 | 0 | 2003 | 2005 |
| Viktor Hierländer | 5 | 3 | 1925 | 1928 |
| Walter Hiesel | 2 | 0 | 1964 | 1966 |
| Henri Hiltl | 1 | 0 | 1931 | 1931 |
| Rainer Hinesser | 1 | 1 | 1953 | 1953 |
| Reinhold Hintermaier | 15 | 1 | 1978 | 1982 |
| Lukas Hinterseer | 3 | 0 | 2013 | 2019 |
| Horst Hirnschrodt | 19 | 1 | 1962 | 1972 |
| Friedrich Hirschl | 2 | 1 | 1908 | 1908 |
| Walter Hochmaier | 3 | 1 | 1994 | 1994 |
| Gerfried Hodschar | 2 | 0 | 1967 | 1968 |
| Ferdinand Hoel | 4 | 1 | 1915 | 1915 |
| Josef Hofbauer | 3 | 1 | 1924 | 1924 |
| Otto Hofbauer | 2 | 1 | 1955 | 1955 |
| Karl Höfer | 1 | 0 | 1959 | 1959 |
| Kornel Hoffmann | 1 | 0 | 1904 | 1904 |
| Johann Hoffmann | 1 | 0 | 1929 | 1929 |
| Leopold Hojtasch | 1 | 0 | 1907 | 1907 |
| Wilhelm Holec | 1 | 0 | 1935 | 1935 |
| Thomas Höller | 2 | 0 | 2002 | 2002 |
| Rudolf Höllerl | 1 | 0 | 1909 | 1909 |
| Andreas Hölzl | 10 | 2 | 2008 | 2010 |
| Walter Horak | 13 | 3 | 1954 | 1960 |
| Josef Horejs | 4 | 0 | 1922 | 1924 |
| Walter Hörmann | 15 | 0 | 1984 | 1992 |
| Johann Hörmayer | 9 | 0 | 1963 | 1968 |
| Rudolf Horvath | 16 | 0 | 1968 | 1976 |
| Philipp Hosiner | 5 | 2 | 2011 | 2013 |
| Otto Höss | 6 | 2 | 1923 | 1926 |
| Peter Hrstic | 3 | 1 | 1985 | 1987 |
| Adolf Huber | 13 | 10 | 1949 | 1953 |
| Gustav Huber | 3 | 2 | 1902 | 1904 |
| Karl Huber | 1 | 0 | 1927 | 1927 |
| Wilhelm Huberts | 4 | 1 | 1959 | 1960 |
| Wilhelm Huberts | 3 | 0 | 1970 | 1970 |
| Ferdinand Humenberger | 2 | 0 | 1918 | 1918 |
| Karl Humenberger | 1 | 0 | 1928 | 1928 |
| Ludwig Hussak | 14 | 5 | 1905 | 1912 |
| Adi Hütter | 14 | 3 | 1994 | 1997 |
| Felix Hültel | 2 | 0 | 1902 | 1906 |
| Andreas Ibertsberger | 14 | 1 | 2004 | 2009 |
| Robert Ibertsberger | 8 | 0 | 1999 | 2001 |
| Alois Jagodic | 2 | 0 | 1971 | 1971 |
| Otto Jancsik | 2 | 0 | 1925 | 1926 |
| Anton Janda | 10 | 0 | 1928 | 1934 |
| Thomas Janeschitz | 1 | 0 | 1993 | 1993 |
| Johannes Jank | 1 | 0 | 1963 | 1963 |
| Jakob Jantscher | 16 | 1 | 2009 | 2013 |
| Alois Jaros | 1 | 0 | 1957 | 1957 |
| Karl Jarosch | 1 | 0 | 1956 | 1956 |
| Josef Jech | 2 | 0 | 1908 | 1908 |
| Franz Jellinek | 1 | 0 | 1928 | 1928 |
| Camillo Jerusalem | 12 | 6 | 1936 | 1945 |
| Karl Jestrab | 1 | 0 | 1935 | 1935 |
| Ludwig Jetzinger | 2 | 0 | 1915 | 1915 |
| Karl Jiszda | 11 | 7 | 1921 | 1927 |
| Walter Joachim | 4 | 0 | 1917 | 1919 |
| Siegfried Joksch | 22 | 0 | 1945 | 1950 |
| Karl Jordan | 3 | 0 | 1916 | 1917 |
| Robert Juranic | 6 | 3 | 1926 | 1928 |
| Gernot Jurtin | 12 | 1 | 1979 | 1983 |
| Matthias Kaburek | 4 | 2 | 1934 | 1935 |
| Volkan Kahraman | 3 | 0 | 2002 | 2002 |
| Wilhelm Kainrath | 2 | 0 | 1962 | 1962 |
| Robert Kaiser | 1 | 0 | 1969 | 1969 |
| Otto Kaller | 8 | 0 | 1926 | 1945 |
| Ernst Kaltenbrunner | 1 | 1 | 1960 | 1960 |
| Günter Kaltenbrunner | 4 | 0 | 1962 | 1968 |
| Josef Kaltenbrunner | 11 | 0 | 1907 | 1913 |
| Eduard Kanhäuser | 9 | 0 | 1922 | 1925 |
| Karl Kanhäuser | 5 | 3 | 1921 | 1924 |
| Goran Kartalija | 4 | 0 | 1996 | 1997 |
| Franz Kaspirek | 2 | 1 | 1946 | 1946 |
| Norbert Katz | 3 | 0 | 1921 | 1921 |
| Markus Katzer | 11 | 0 | 2003 | 2008 |
| Adalbert Kaubek | 2 | 0 | 1955 | 1956 |
| Jürgen Kauz | 2 | 0 | 1999 | 1999 |
| Christian Keglevits | 18 | 3 | 1980 | 1991 |
| Franz Kellinger | 1 | 0 | 1929 | 1929 |
| Karl Kerbach | 1 | 0 | 1946 | 1946 |
| Manfred Kern | 3 | 0 | 1985 | 1988 |
| Friedrich Kerr | 7 | 0 | 1916 | 1918 |
| Reinhard Kienast | 13 | 3 | 1983 | 1987 |
| Roman Kienast | 11 | 1 | 2007 | 2011 |
| Mario Kienzl | 1 | 0 | 2009 | 2009 |
| Markus Kiesenebner | 12 | 1 | 2004 | 2007 |
| Leopold Kiesling | 1 | 0 | 1912 | 1912 |
| Willibald Kirbes | 1 | 1 | 1928 | 1928 |
| Herwig Kircher | 2 | 0 | 1974 | 1975 |
| Richard Kitzbichler | 17 | 0 | 1996 | 2002 |
| Helmut Kitzmüller | 1 | 0 | 1960 | 1960 |
| Johann Klima | 11 | 3 | 1923 | 1931 |
| Wolfgang Knaller | 4 | 0 | 1991 | 1996 |
| Adolf Knoll | 21 | 2 | 1957 | 1966 |
| H. Knöll | 3 | 0 | 1908 | 1909 |
| Anton Koch | 3 | 0 | 1922 | 1925 |
| Tomica Kocijan | 4 | 1 | 2000 | 2001 |
| Friedrich Köck | 7 | 1 | 1916 | 1922 |
| Karl Kodat | 5 | 1 | 1971 | 1971 |
| Johann Kogler | 7 | 0 | 1994 | 1995 |
| Franz Köhler | 3 | 0 | 1926 | 1927 |
| Oskar Kohlhauser | 3 | 0 | 1956 | 1962 |
| Heinrich Kohn | 1 | 0 | 1907 | 1907 |
| Richard Kohn | 6 | 2 | 1908 | 1912 |
| Ferdinand Kolarik | 2 | 0 | 1963 | 1963 |
| Walter Koleznik | 6 | 1 | 1963 | 1968 |
| Roland Kollmann | 11 | 4 | 2003 | 2005 |
| Walter Kollmann | 16 | 0 | 1952 | 1958 |
| Stefan Kölly | 1 | 0 | 1952 | 1952 |
| Fritz Kominek | 6 | 1 | 1945 | 1953 |
| Peter Koncilia | 6 | 0 | 1975 | 1977 |
| Engelbert König | 5 | 0 | 1905 | 1912 |
| Leopold König | 1 | 0 | 1914 | 1914 |
| Otto Konrad | 12 | 0 | 1989 | 1995 |
| Arnold Koreimann | 1 | 0 | 1982 | 1982 |
| Ümit Korkmaz | 10 | 0 | 2008 | 2011 |
| Heinz Körner | 7 | 0 | 1913 | 1918 |
| Robert Körner | 16 | 1 | 1948 | 1955 |
| Giuseppe Koschier | 2 | 0 | 1960 | 1960 |
| Božo Kovačević | 7 | 0 | 2002 | 2006 |
| Julius Kovazh | 1 | 0 | 1957 | 1957 |
| Johann Kowanda | 1 | 1 | 1922 | 1922 |
| Karl Kowanz | 17 | 0 | 1948 | 1953 |
| Karel Koželuh | 4 | 1 | 1917 | 1918 |
| Ernst Kozlicek | 11 | 2 | 1953 | 1958 |
| Paul Kozlicek | 14 | 1 | 1956 | 1963 |
| August Kraupar | 9 | 0 | 1915 | 1918 |
| Johann Kraus | 1 | 1 | 1916 | 1916 |
| Robert Kraus | 1 | 0 | 1909 | 1909 |
| Bernd Krauss | 22 | 0 | 1981 | 1984 |
| Friedrich Kremser | 4 | 0 | 1965 | 1965 |
| Werner Kriess | 15 | 0 | 1971 | 1975 |
| Karl Krof | 1 | 0 | 1909 | 1909 |
| Gustav Krojer | 2 | 0 | 1911 | 1911 |
| Karl Krug | 1 | 0 | 1905 | 1905 |
| Karl Kubik | 2 | 1 | 1908 | 1908 |
| Sanel Kuljić | 20 | 3 | 2005 | 2007 |
| Stefan Kulovits | 5 | 0 | 2005 | 2011 |
| Franz Kürner | 2 | 0 | 1915 | 1915 |
| Ladislaus Kurpiel | 8 | 0 | 1908 | 1912 |
| Richard Kuthan | 24 | 14 | 1912 | 1928 |
| Alois Kvitek | 1 | 0 | 1908 | 1908 |
| Rolf Landerl | 1 | 0 | 2002 | 2002 |
| Andreas Lasnik | 1 | 0 | 2005 | 2005 |
| Josef Lebeda | 2 | 0 | 1935 | 1935 |
| Heinrich Lebensaft | 6 | 0 | 1924 | 1926 |
| Kurt Leitner | 1 | 0 | 1971 | 1971 |
| Heinrich Lenczewsky | 7 | 0 | 1906 | 1909 |
| Max Leuthe | 2 | 0 | 1903 | 1905 |
| Stefan Lexa | 6 | 0 | 2001 | 2009 |
| Michael Liendl | 1 | 0 | 2014 | 2014 |
| Toni Linhart | 6 | 1 | 1963 | 1969 |
| Josef Linzmayer | 1 | 0 | 1909 | 1909 |
| Andreas Lipa | 1 | 0 | 2000 | 2000 |
| Johann Löser | 1 | 0 | 1962 | 1962 |
| Robert Lowe | 1 | 0 | 1904 | 1904 |
| Viktor Löwenfeld | 4 | 0 | 1909 | 1918 |
| Walter Ludescher | 7 | 0 | 1964 | 1966 |
| Ignaz Ludwig | 3 | 0 | 1924 | 1926 |
| Johann Luef | 13 | 0 | 1929 | 1933 |
| Adolf Macek | 4 | 0 | 1965 | 1966 |
| Leonhard Machu | 1 | 0 | 1930 | 1930 |
| Daniel Madlener | 2 | 0 | 1988 | 1988 |
| Josef Madlmayer | 1 | 0 | 1928 | 1928 |
| Roman Mählich | 20 | 0 | 1992 | 2002 |
| Stefan Maierhofer | 19 | 1 | 2008 | 2011 |
| Wolfgang Mair | 3 | 0 | 2005 | 2005 |
| Thomas Mandl | 13 | 0 | 2002 | 2004 |
| Stephan Marasek | 11 | 1 | 1995 | 1996 |
| Rupert Marko | 3 | 3 | 1988 | 1988 |
| Sebastián Martínez | 2 | 0 | 2005 | 2005 |
| Josef Mastalka | 1 | 0 | 1906 | 1906 |
| Helmut Maurer | 1 | 0 | 1974 | 1974 |
| Johann Mayringer | 3 | 0 | 1911 | 1911 |
| Willy Meisl | 1 | 0 | 1920 | 1920 |
| Peter Meister | 1 | 0 | 1977 | 1977 |
| Hans Menasse | 2 | 0 | 1953 | 1954 |
| Max Merkel | 1 | 0 | 1952 | 1952 |
| Robert Merz | 13 | 5 | 1908 | 1914 |
| Gerald Messlender | 14 | 0 | 1983 | 1987 |
| Helmut Metzler | 6 | 0 | 1967 | 1969 |
| Leopold Mikolasch | 8 | 0 | 1945 | 1948 |
| Josef Milnarik | 1 | 0 | 1924 | 1924 |
| Dieter Mirnegg | 15 | 0 | 1979 | 1981 |
| Hans Mock | 12 | 0 | 1929 | 1937 |
| Josef Molzer | 2 | 1 | 1932 | 1932 |
| Wilhelm Morocutti | 17 | 5 | 1922 | 1928 |
| Michael Mörz | 12 | 0 | 2005 | 2007 |
| Raimund Mössmer | 1 | 0 | 1902 | 1902 |
| Adolf Müller | 1 | 0 | 1906 | 1906 |
| Alois Müller | 6 | 2 | 1912 | 1912 |
| Heinrich Müller | 5 | 4 | 1932 | 1933 |
| Johann Müller | 2 | 0 | 1945 | 1945 |
| Viktor Müller | 5 | 0 | 1911 | 1912 |
| Franz Musil | 2 | 0 | 1925 | 1926 |
| Josef Musil | 5 | 0 | 1947 | 1952 |
| Philipp Nauß | 1 | 0 | 1902 | 1902 |
| Sándor Nemes | 2 | 0 | 1925 | 1925 |
| Karl Neubauer | 7 | 2 | 1919 | 1921 |
| Leopold Neubauer | 18 | 6 | 1908 | 1917 |
| Günther Neukirchner | 14 | 1 | 1998 | 2001 |
| Johann Neumann | 8 | 2 | 1911 | 1923 |
| Leopold Neumer | 4 | 2 | 1937 | 1946 |
| Karl Nickerl | 3 | 0 | 1955 | 1959 |
| Richard Niederbacher | 4 | 0 | 1984 | 1988 |
| Herbert Ninaus | 2 | 1 | 1958 | 1958 |
| Otto Noll | 3 | 0 | 1912 | 1912 |
| Franz Oberacher | 8 | 1 | 1976 | 1985 |
| Herbert Oberhofer | 6 | 0 | 1976 | 1977 |
| Heinz Oberparleiter | 1 | 0 | 1962 | 1962 |
| Ernst Ogris | 1 | 1 | 1991 | 1991 |
| Rubin Okotie | 18 | 2 | 2008 | 2016 |
| Heinrich Oppenheim | 1 | 0 | 1909 | 1909 |
| Alen Orman | 1 | 0 | 2002 | 2002 |
| Manuel Ortlechner | 9 | 0 | 2006 | 2013 |
| Rudolf Oslansky | 12 | 1 | 1958 | 1963 |
| Johann Ostermann | 1 | 1 | 1933 | 1933 |
| Karl Ostricek | 17 | 0 | 1921 | 1924 |
| Ramazan Özcan | 10 | 0 | 2008 | 2017 |
| Johann Pacista | 2 | 0 | 1920 | 1920 |
| Peter Pacult | 24 | 1 | 1982 | 1993 |
| Egon Pajenk | 3 | 0 | 1974 | 1975 |
| Jürgen Panis | 5 | 0 | 2002 | 2002 |
| Jürgen Patocka | 5 | 0 | 2007 | 2009 |
| Günther Paulitsch | 1 | 0 | 1964 | 1964 |
| Robert Pavlicek | 6 | 0 | 1933 | 1935 |
| Franz Pavuza | 7 | 0 | 1946 | 1947 |
| Helge Payer | 20 | 0 | 2003 | 2009 |
| Yasin Pehlivan | 17 | 0 | 2009 | 2012 |
| Heinz Peischl | 3 | 0 | 1990 | 1991 |
| Josef Pekarek | 5 | 0 | 1937 | 1937 |
| Karl Pekarna | 2 | 0 | 1904 | 1908 |
| Franz Pelikan | 6 | 0 | 1947 | 1956 |
| Peter Persidis | 7 | 0 | 1976 | 1978 |
| Hans Pesser | 8 | 3 | 1935 | 1937 |
| Josef Pfeiffer | 1 | 0 | 1909 | 1909 |
| Anton Pichler | 11 | 0 | 1976 | 1985 |
| Roman Pichler | 13 | 0 | 1960 | 1967 |
| Rudolf Pichler | 3 | 1 | 1955 | 1960 |
| Thomas Pichlmann | 2 | 0 | 2005 | 2005 |
| Gerald Piesinger | 6 | 0 | 1986 | 1987 |
| Patrick Pircher | 2 | 0 | 2005 | 2005 |
| Hans Pirkner | 20 | 4 | 1969 | 1978 |
| Franz Plank | 1 | 0 | 1922 | 1922 |
| Gernot Plassnegger | 1 | 0 | 2006 | 2006 |
| Heinrich Plhak | 4 | 0 | 1913 | 1916 |
| Stefan Ploc | 2 | 0 | 1945 | 1945 |
| Andreas Poiger | 1 | 0 | 1990 | 1990 |
| Egon Pollak | 1 | 0 | 1924 | 1924 |
| Johann Pollatschek | 2 | 0 | 1906 | 1907 |
| Mario Posch | 2 | 0 | 1992 | 1992 |
| Günther Pospischil | 5 | 0 | 1979 | 1980 |
| Josef Prager | 6 | 0 | 1904 | 1910 |
| Thomas Prager | 14 | 1 | 2006 | 2009 |
| Johann Pregesbauer | 9 | 0 | 1980 | 1984 |
| Arthur Preiss | 2 | 0 | 1909 | 1909 |
| Gilbert Prilasnig | 16 | 0 | 1997 | 2001 |
| Erich Probst | 19 | 18 | 1951 | 1960 |
| Franz Prohaska | 5 | 0 | 1915 | 1917 |
| Christian Prosenik | 24 | 1 | 1991 | 1999 |
| Václav Prousek | 2 | 1 | 1917 | 1917 |
| A. Pulchert | 2 | 1 | 1903 | 1903 |
| Peter Pumm | 19 | 1 | 1965 | 1973 |
| Marcus Pürk | 2 | 1 | 1995 | 2002 |
| Erwin Puschner | 2 | 0 | 1923 | 1924 |
| Ignaz Puschnik | 7 | 0 | 1957 | 1964 |
| Gustav Putzendopler | 2 | 0 | 1919 | 1919 |
| Franz Radakovics | 1 | 0 | 1933 | 1933 |
| Zeljko Radovic | 1 | 0 | 2000 | 2000 |
| Friedrich Rafreider | 14 | 2 | 1961 | 1963 |
| Rudolf Raftl | 6 | 0 | 1933 | 1937 |
| Dieter Ramusch | 10 | 1 | 1995 | 1997 |
| Karl Rappan | 2 | 1 | 1927 | 1927 |
| Helmut Redl | 19 | 7 | 1967 | 1970 |
| Emil Regnard | 6 | 0 | 1923 | 1927 |
| Emil Reichel | 1 | 0 | 1910 | 1910 |
| Hannes Reinmayr | 14 | 4 | 1993 | 1999 |
| Andreas Reisinger | 10 | 0 | 1989 | 1990 |
| Peter Reiter | 1 | 0 | 1958 | 1958 |
| Max Reiterer | 1 | 0 | 1924 | 1924 |
| Franz Resch | 2 | 0 | 1991 | 1991 |
| Poldl Resch | 16 | 0 | 1922 | 1927 |
| Heinrich Retschury | 6 | 0 | 1908 | 1909 |
| Herbert Rettensteiner | 15 | 0 | 1970 | 1974 |
| Johann Richter | 10 | 0 | 1923 | 1927 |
| Alfred Riedl | 4 | 0 | 1975 | 1978 |
| Franz Riegler | 3 | 0 | 1936 | 1945 |
| Johann Riegler | 6 | 1 | 1951 | 1955 |
| Günther Rinker | 2 | 1 | 1975 | 1976 |
| Rudolf Röckl | 24 | 0 | 1949 | 1956 |
| Gerhard Rodax | 20 | 3 | 1985 | 1991 |
| Klaus Rohseano | 1 | 0 | 1999 | 1999 |
| Alfred Roscher | 1 | 0 | 1987 | 1987 |
| Leopold Rotter | 6 | 0 | 1991 | 1992 |
| Daniel Royer | 6 | 0 | 2011 | 2011 |
| Karl Rumbold | 1 | 0 | 1913 | 1913 |
| Franz Runge | 3 | 2 | 1927 | 1928 |
| Heinz Russ | 2 | 0 | 1968 | 1968 |
| Ernst Sabeditsch | 7 | 0 | 1945 | 1947 |
| Rudolf Sabetzer | 3 | 2 | 1956 | 1965 |
| Herfried Sabitzer | 6 | 1 | 1992 | 1997 |
| Klaus Salmutter | 4 | 0 | 2006 | 2007 |
| Josef Sara | 1 | 0 | 1979 | 1979 |
| Yüksel Sariyar | 13 | 1 | 2005 | 1007 |
| Jürgen Säumel | 20 | 0 | 2005 | 2012 |
| Christoph Saurer | 1 | 0 | 2009 | 2009 |
| Leopold Sax | 1 | 0 | 1904 | 1904 |
| Josef Schediwy | 4 | 1 | 1903 | 1909 |
| Franz Scheu | 1 | 0 | 1909 | 1909 |
| Max Scheuer | 1 | 0 | 1923 | 1923 |
| Johann Schierl | 2 | 0 | 1923 | 1924 |
| Günter Schießwald | 2 | 0 | 2000 | 2001 |
| Heinz Schilcher | 1 | 0 | 1973 | 1973 |
| Frenkie Schinkels | 6 | 1 | 1992 | 1993 |
| Rainer Schlagbauer | 2 | 0 | 1971 | 1974 |
| Rudolf Schlauf | 1 | 0 | 1935 | 1935 |
| Walter Schleger | 22 | 1 | 1951 | 1962 |
| Franz Schlosser | 4 | 0 | 1914 | 1915 |
| Willibald Schmaus | 14 | 0 | 1935 | 1937 |
| Johann Schmid | 6 | 0 | 1912 | 1917 |
| Peter Schmidt | 2 | 0 | 1966 | 1967 |
| Wilhelm Schmieger | 7 | 5 | 1907 | 1912 |
| Viktor Schneck | 1 | 0 | 1903 | 1903 |
| Harald Schneider | 1 | 0 | 1991 | 1991 |
| Josef Schneider | 11 | 0 | 1925 | 1927 |
| Karl Schneider | 7 | 1 | 1926 | 1928 |
| Eduard Schönecker | 1 | 0 | 1904 | 1904 |
| Karl Schott | 10 | 0 | 1927 | 1931 |
| Engelbert Schrammel | 5 | 0 | 1902 | 1904 |
| Thomas Schrammel | 1 | 0 | 2011 | 2011 |
| Roman Schramseis | 18 | 0 | 1928 | 1932 |
| Andreas Schranz | 6 | 0 | 2004 | 2006 |
| Karl Schrenk | 2 | 1 | 1909 | 1909 |
| Alfred Schrottenbaum | 1 | 0 | 1963 | 1963 |
| Edwin Schulz | 2 | 0 | 1903 | 1903 |
| Johann Schwarz | 1 | 0 | 1908 | 1908 |
| Johann Schwarz | 3 | 1 | 1911 | 1913 |
| Werner Schwarz | 3 | 0 | 1976 | 1976 |
| Paul Schweda | 3 | 0 | 1952 | 1953 |
| Franz Sedlacek | 11 | 0 | 1913 | 1918 |
| Josef Sedláček | 1 | 1 | 1917 | 1917 |
| Rudolf Seidl | 8 | 1 | 1920 | 1928 |
| Walter Seitl | 6 | 2 | 1965 | 1966 |
| Helmut Senekowitsch | 18 | 5 | 1957 | 1968 |
| Robert Seuffert | 1 | 0 | 1924 | 1924 |
| Helmut Siber | 11 | 4 | 1967 | 1969 |
| Gernot Sick | 2 | 0 | 2004 | 2004 |
| Ignaz Sigl | 24 | 5 | 1925 | 1931 |
| Ernst Singer | 1 | 0 | 1909 | 1909 |
| Karl Skerlan | 14 | 3 | 1958 | 1964 |
| Walter Skocik | 14 | 0 | 1960 | 1967 |
| Stefan Skoumal | 4 | 1 | 1934 | 1935 |
| Rudolf Smolek | 3 | 0 | 1908 | 1908 |
| Engelbert Smutny | 3 | 0 | 1946 | 1946 |
| Johann Sock | 1 | 0 | 1924 | 1924 |
| Josef Spale | 4 | 0 | 1946 | 1946 |
| Andreas Spielmann | 1 | 0 | 1986 | 1986 |
| Jaroslav Špindler | 1 | 0 | 1911 | 1911 |
| Herbert Stachowicz | 4 | 0 | 1972 | 1973 |
| Walter Stamm | 7 | 0 | 1975 | 1978 |
| Marko Stanković | 1 | 0 | 2008 | 2008 |
| Charles Stansfield | 2 | 4 | 1904 | 1905 |
| August Starek | 22 | 4 | 1968 | 1974 |
| Rudolf Steinbauer | 3 | 0 | 1985 | 1987 |
| Manfred Steiner | 2 | 0 | 1975 | 1975 |
| Gerhard Steinkogler | 5 | 1 | 1979 | 1984 |
| K. Steinmann | 1 | 0 | 1903 | 1903 |
| Willibald Stejskal | 1 | 0 | 1918 | 1918 |
| Wilhelm Steurer | 1 | 0 | 1918 | 1918 |
| Karl Stoiber | 6 | 2 | 1928 | 1936 |
| Gerald Strafner | 3 | 0 | 2001 | 2001 |
| Rudolf Strittrich | 4 | 0 | 1946 | 1949 |
| Johann Strnad | 1 | 0 | 1918 | 1918 |
| Erich Strobl | 5 | 0 | 1960 | 1962 |
| Josef Stroh | 17 | 4 | 1935 | 1948 |
| Christian Stumpf | 2 | 1 | 1995 | 1996 |
| Josef Stürmer | 2 | 0 | 1916 | 1918 |
| Karl Stürmer | 2 | 0 | 1903 | 1905 |
| Stefan Sudrich | 1 | 0 | 1913 | 1913 |
| Markus Suttner | 20 | 0 | 2012 | 2017 |
| Ferdinand Swatosch | 23 | 18 | 1914 | 1925 |
| Jakob Swatosch | 3 | 0 | 1911 | 1914 |
| Franz Swoboda | 23 | 0 | 1955 | 1960 |
| Rudolf Szanwald | 12 | 0 | 1955 | 1965 |
| Johann Szauer | 2 | 0 | 1966 | 1966 |
| Karl Szoldatics | 4 | 0 | 1927 | 1931 |
| Johann Tandler | 18 | 3 | 1924 | 1930 |
| Josef Taurer | 6 | 1 | 1902 | 1905 |
| Ludwig Tauschek | 1 | 0 | 1935 | 1935 |
| Felix Tekusch | 9 | 0 | 1910 | 1914 |
| Karl Tekusch | 15 | 0 | 1908 | 1918 |
| Josef Teufel | 4 | 0 | 1924 | 1925 |
| Heinz Thonhofer | 1 | 0 | 1983 | 1983 |
| Ernst Thurm | 2 | 0 | 1908 | 1908 |
| Gustav Tögel | 1 | 0 | 1931 | 1931 |
| Alois Tremmel | 1 | 1 | 1919 | 1919 |
| Christopher Trimmel | 3 | 0 | 2009 | 2010 |
| Heribert Trubrig | 10 | 0 | 1960 | 1962 |
| Ewald Türmer | 7 | 0 | 1984 | 1986 |
| Franz Twaroch | 2 | 0 | 1913 | 1913 |
| Ewald Ullmann | 6 | 0 | 1965 | 1967 |
| Franz Urban | 2 | 0 | 1914 | 1914 |
| Johann Urbanek | 15 | 0 | 1931 | 1936 |
| Josef Uridil | 8 | 8 | 1919 | 1926 |
| Jan Vanik | 2 | 0 | 1917 | 1917 |
| Peter Vargo | 2 | 0 | 1963 | 1963 |
| Franz Vavra | 3 | 0 | 1937 | 1937 |
| Franz Viehböck | 18 | 2 | 1962 | 1966 |
| Rudolf Viertl | 16 | 4 | 1925 | 1937 |
| Karl Vladar | 5 | 0 | 1906 | 1909 |
| Adolf Vogl | 20 | 6 | 1931 | 1936 |
| Leopold Vogl | 2 | 2 | 1935 | 1935 |
| Željko Vuković | 3 | 0 | 2001 | 2001 |
| Emil Wachuda | 1 | 0 | 1902 | 1902 |
| Arthur Wackenreuther | 5 | 0 | 1908 | 1911 |
| Franz Wagner | 18 | 0 | 1933 | 1936 |
| Friedrich Wagner | 1 | 0 | 1919 | 1919 |
| Michael Wagner | 10 | 0 | 2002 | 2003 |
| Rudolf Wagner | 1 | 0 | 1903 | 1903 |
| Stefan Wagner | 2 | 0 | 1947 | 1947 |
| Josef Wahl | 1 | 0 | 1966 | 1966 |
| Georg Waitz | 1 | 1 | 1932 | 1932 |
| Walter Waldhör | 2 | 1 | 1992 | 1992 |
| Helmut Wallner | 3 | 0 | 1969 | 1969 |
| Werner Walzer | 1 | 0 | 1974 | 1974 |
| Hans Walzhofer | 5 | 0 | 1927 | 1934 |
| Otto Walzhofer | 13 | 3 | 1950 | 1957 |
| Josef Wana | 1 | 0 | 1922 | 1922 |
| Maximilian Wancura | 1 | 0 | 1907 | 1907 |
| Helmut Wartinger | 1 | 0 | 1980 | 1980 |
| Helmut Wartusch | 2 | 0 | 1967 | 1967 |
| Robert Wazinger | 5 | 0 | 1992 | 1993 |
| Franz Weber | 6 | 0 | 1910 | 1913 |
| Manuel Weber | 1 | 0 | 2011 | 2011 |
| Anton Wegscheider | 1 | 0 | 1907 | 1907 |
| Helmut Weigl | 1 | 0 | 1975 | 1975 |
| Wilhelm Weihrauch | 3 | 0 | 1907 | 1909 |
| Andreas Weimann | 14 | 0 | 2012 | 2015 |
| Johann Weinberg | 1 | 0 | 1910 | 1910 |
| Rudolf Weinhofer | 4 | 0 | 1986 | 1987 |
| Friedrich Weiss | 1 | 0 | 1919 | 1919 |
| Josef Weiss | 2 | 0 | 1927 | 1927 |
| Thomas Weissenberger | 1 | 0 | 1994 | 1994 |
| Kurt Welzl | 22 | 10 | 1975 | 1982 |
| Jürgen Werner | 11 | 0 | 1986 | 1988 |
| Jürgen Werner | 2 | 0 | 1994 | 1994 |
| Franz Weselik | 11 | 13 | 1928 | 1933 |
| Christoph Westerthaler | 6 | 0 | 1989 | 1993 |
| Arnold Wetl | 21 | 4 | 1991 | 1999 |
| Ewald Wieger | 1 | 0 | 1962 | 1962 |
| Julius Wiesner | 1 | 0 | 1902 | 1902 |
| Franz Wilczek | 2 | 0 | 1903 | 1904 |
| Karel Wilda | 3 | 2 | 1917 | 1918 |
| Gerd Wimmer | 5 | 0 | 1999 | 2002 |
| Kevin Wimmer | 9 | 0 | 2013 | 2018 |
| Johann Windisch | 9 | 0 | 1960 | 1964 |
| Hannes Winklbauer | 7 | 0 | 1974 | 1975 |
| Thomas Winklhofer | 20 | 0 | 1993 | 2001 |
| Ferdinand Wolf | 2 | 1 | 1907 | 1907 |
| Patrick Wolf | 2 | 0 | 2010 | 2010 |
| Franz Wolny | 8 | 2 | 1962 | 1968 |
| Karl Wondrak | 15 | 3 | 1914 | 1924 |
| Siegfried Wortmann | 1 | 1 | 1926 | 1926 |
| Werner Zanon | 1 | 0 | 1977 | 1977 |
| Ferdinand Zechmeister | 3 | 0 | 1953 | 1960 |
| Michael Zisser | 1 | 1 | 1993 | 1993 |
| Rudolf Zöhrer | 3 | 0 | 1932 | 1937 |
| Mario Zuenelli | 2 | 0 | 1980 | 1980 |
| Philipp Zulechner | 1 | 0 | 2013 | 2013 |
| Friedrich Zwazl | 6 | 0 | 1947 | 1950 |

== See also ==
- List of Austria international footballers, players with 25 caps or more
