= Sportclub Wacker Vienna =

Austrian football club

Sportclub Wacker was an Austrian football club based in the Obermeidling district of Vienna. It was established between 1906 and 1908 at the initiative of schoolboy Max Freund and continued to operate until the 1971 merger with Jedlesee Sports club SK Admira Vienna, which resulted in the formation of FC Admira/Wacker. This new entity succeeded both clubs as their legal successor. The club colors of Wacker Vienna were black and white, and the team played its home matches in the 20,000-capacity stadium on Rosasgasse (Wackerplatz) near Schönbrunn Palace.

In 53 years competing in the first division, the Meidling Buam achieved 478 victories. The club reached its historical pinnacle in 1947 when it became champions and won the cup final against Austria Wien by a score of 4–3. The club's most notable success at an international tournament occurred in 1951 when it advanced to the Mitropacup final. Nevertheless, Wacker achieved notoriety as the "eternal runners-up" in the league. If one considers the abbreviated championship in 1945, Wacker finished the season in second place eight times, but only once in first place.

== History ==
=== 1906-1912: The first years of the Meidling Buam ===
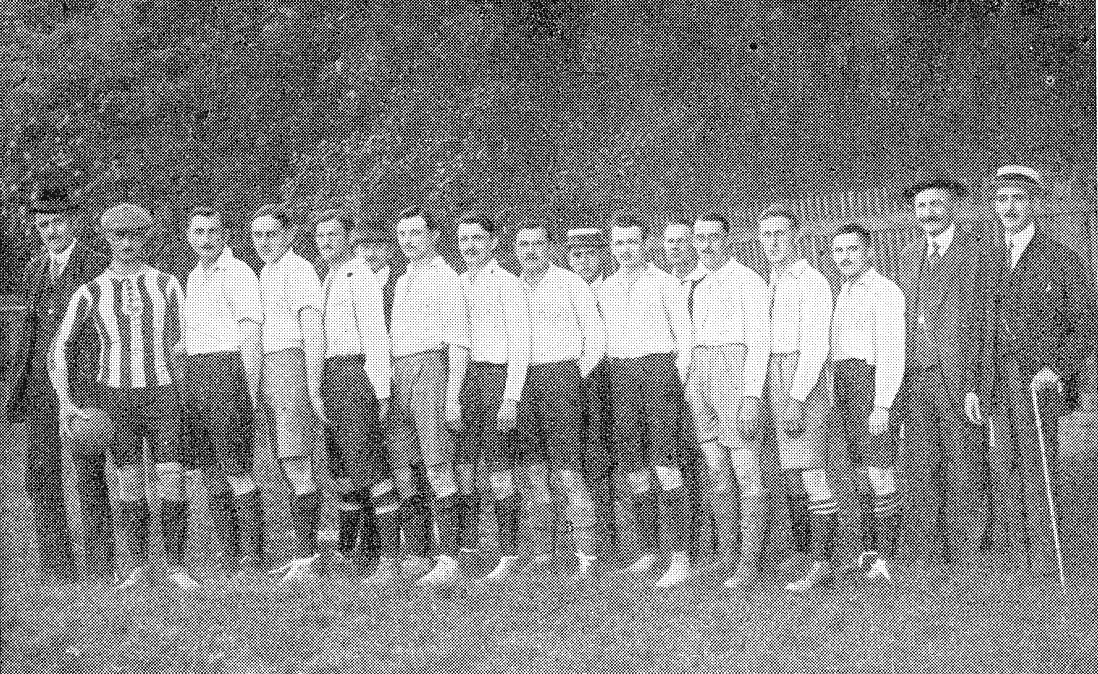
This image, which dates from the period shortly after the team's accession to the ÖFV (Austrian Football Association) in 1909, is believed to be the oldest extant representation of the Wacker team.

SC Wacker Vienna was established by Max Freund, a soccer enthusiast from Meidling. Freund was a member of the Vienna AC youth soccer team and found the lengthy and costly journeys from Meidling to the Prater for training to be a significant inconvenience. He collaborated with his friend Oskar Wittek to recruit numerous pupils, with whom they met regularly to play soccer next to the Meidling slaughterhouse. In 1906, Max Freund finally proposed the establishment of his soccer club, which he named "Wacker." However, this ambitious endeavor ultimately failed due to the lack of an appropriate legal age among the prospective members, who were unable to register the club with the authorities. The issue was temporarily set aside, and the young footballers initially focused on establishing their clubhouse and procuring their club uniforms. A suitable location was swiftly identified in the laundry room at Aichholzgasse 33, where the Wacker players could now store all their belongings, including goalposts. Additionally, the pupils persuaded a mother to have black and white shirts made for the entire team. The club colors were selected because the majority of the young athletes had previously worn black cloth trousers and a white rowing shirt when playing soccer.

In 1907, the individual deemed suitable to assume the role of club chairman was identified in the form of Mr. Rudolf Krones, thus paving the way for the formal establishment of Wacker Wien. The innkeeper Nitsch provided the club with a sports ground in the form of a sand pit, which was initially leveled by the club members and prepared for the inaugural match in 1909 against ASV Hertha Wien. The inaugural match on the club's pitch resulted in a 3:1 defeat against the visitors from Favoriten. In the same year, the Wacker players achieved admission to their newly founded club to the Austrian Football Association. Starting in the third and therefore lowest class, Wacker was able to play its way unbeaten into the second-class "2nd Class A," where it competed against clubs that are largely unknown today. In this period, the Meidlingers were pitted against formidable opponents, including Blue Star, Red Star, Wiener Bewegungsspieler, Donaustadt, Nußdorfer AC, Ober St. Veit, and Hernalser Sportfreunde. Despite facing considerable challenges, the Black & Whites demonstrated resilience and competitiveness in their inaugural season, ultimately claiming the championship title in their second year in the second division in 1911/12. In Franz Twaroch, the Meidlingers also had their first "star" and crowd favorite in the team, who even made an appearance for the Austrian national team, which had been in existence since 1902. This was the first player from a second division club ever to do so.

=== 1912-1934: Up and down in the championship ===
To be promoted to the first division, the Black & Whites were required to play a relegation match against the penultimate team in the first division, SpC Rudolfshügel. The Wacker players entered the match with a great deal of respect for the Rudolfshüglers, but ultimately lost by a score of 0:6. However, just one season later, Wacker was once again at the top of the second division table and was subsequently challenged by Hertha Vienna in the relegation match. The results against the favorites were 0:2 and 2:2, which resulted in Wacker once again missing out on promotion to the first division. With an impressive goal difference of 102:15, Meidling 1914 secured the second division championship for a third consecutive year. That year, the relegation matches were also abolished at Vienna's request. This was surprising, as the Döblingen side had unexpectedly been relegated themselves at the end of the season. Wacker was finally in the first division. However, the First World War soon overshadowed the joy of promotion to the highest level. Almost the entire Wacker team was called up as soldiers, and around half of them did not return. The club did not play a major role in the war championships. In its first season as a first division club, Wacker was only able to win a single game, but relegation was suspended during the war. Despite finishing at the bottom of the table in the inaugural post-war season in 1919, the club was able to avoid relegation by being promoted to a higher division. The club's rapidly growing popularity in Meidling soon made the construction of a new, larger stadium necessary. On October 8, 1921, the stadium on Rosagasse, which could hold 20,000 spectators, was finally opened with a championship match.

The Wacker fans were able to celebrate their first major success shortly thereafter. With a remarkable 4:2 victory over Rapid Vienna, the Meidlingers advanced to the 1923 Cup final, where they suffered a 3:1 defeat at the hands of Wiener Sport-Club in front of 20,000 spectators at the Hohe Warte. Feigl played in goal for Wacker, Kolndorfer, and Huber as backs, Klicka, Resch, and Pellet in the half-back line, and Liebhardt, goalscorer Kowanda, Wana, Röscher and Stach as forwards. Throughout the championship, the Wacker players achieved consistent mid-table finishes, yet were unable to challenge for the title. The most notable achievements of the season were the individual matches in which the team was able to compete with the top clubs. In 1924, professional football was introduced in Austria, marking the inception of the championship as a professional league. Despite achieving a seventh-place finish in the inaugural professional year, the team subsequently secured ninth and eighth-place finishes in the lower half of the table. The appointment of renowned coaches such as Rigo Kuthan and Jenő Konrád did not yield immediate results. In 1928, however, the club commenced its inaugural season with a noteworthy 4:1 victory over the then-current record champions, Rapid. This result ultimately positioned the club in 4th place in the table, a provisional club record. The away win on June 11, 1929, against the then top European club Slavia Prague 3-0 under coach Ferdinand Feigl, who had been in goal at the 1923 Cup final, is also recorded as particularly valuable in the Wacker chronicle. After this brief high, the team soon returned to mid-table. The majority of the players on the Wacker team at the time were from Meidling, and the majority of them remained loyal to the club for the remainder of their careers. The club was fortunate to have exceptional players such as Karl Zischek, who enabled them to remain consistently at the top of the Austrian league despite their great successes in the national team. In 1934, Wunderteam right winger Zischek and Johann Walzhofer participated in the World Cup in Italy. Despite Austria's advancement to the semi-finals, the team ultimately placed ninth in the tournament and did not compete in the international Mitropacup.

=== 1934-1947: Rise, Second World War and winning the double ===
The ascent to become a top national club commenced in the late 1930s. In their twentieth year as a first division club, the Meidlingers achieved a fourth-place finish in the championship, equaling their best result of 1928. This was followed by even more impressive performances in the subsequent years. The club confirmed its upward trajectory with two additional fourth-place finishes in 1937 and 1938. Following the annexation of Austria by the German Reich on March 12, 1938, the professional national league, which was deemed "unworthy of a German man," was replaced by the amateur championship in the Gauliga XVII. In the face of these adverse circumstances, the club was able to maintain its position for the time being. In the 1938/39 season, Wacker was able to challenge the then series champions Admira Vienna for the first time under coach Otto Haftl. The club temporarily climbed to the top of the table and faced Admira in a direct duel at the Praterstadion on March 19 in the deciding match for the title. Although the Meidlingers suffered a 2:4 defeat in front of 38,000 spectators, they were runners-up for the first time in the club's history. The Black & Whites also finished runners-up in the following years, 1940 and 1941, but were beaten by Rapid on both occasions. However, they were able to build up a comfortable lead thanks to Franz Binder. The club was unfortunate in the 1939 DFB Cup. Wacker advanced to the semifinals of the German Cup, where they faced SV Waldhof Mannheim. The first match in Mannheim ended in a 1–1 draw after extra time. The second match in Vienna ended in a 2–2 draw after extra time, and the third match on a neutral pitch in Munich ended in a 0–0 draw after extra time. A draw was agreed upon, which favored Mannheim. Wacker was eliminated from the competition with a perfect record. The club suffered increasingly from the consequences of the Second World War. A significant number of players were lost to the war, including national goalkeeper Alexander Martinek and Wacker international Josef Pekarek, who lost a leg. The stadium was badly damaged by bombs. In 1944, the club was confronted with the relegation battle, but narrowly won the relegation match against SG Reichsbahn 2:1. The club had to cancel all matches in the 1945 spring championship.

In the week preceding Germany's capitulation, a soccer match was held at Wacker-Platz on May 1, 1945. This match was part of a May Day celebration for the Soviet occupying forces, during which the Meidlingers played against a team from the Vienna Czechs (8:0). The Black & Whites were bolstered by the addition of Marischka and Hahnemann from Admira, and they finished third in the inaugural Austrian post-war championship in 1945/46. The two Admira veterans' arrival had a profound impact on the club's history, but it was the result of a peculiar turn of events at the time. The pitch of Admira was situated on the Russian side of a divided Vienna, while that of Wacker was in British territory, where Marischka and Hahnemann also resided. In order to be able to continue training regularly, the two joined Wacker. In 1947, the history of the Meidling district club finally reached its climax. In the championship, the then three-time runners-up were typically in first place. This time, they successfully mastered the deciding match against Wiener Sport-Club on June 8, 1947, with a 4:0 victory. Double goal scorer Turl Wagner was instrumental in this outcome. Wacker were champions, and just three weeks later on June 29, the Meidlingers faced Vienna Austria in the cup final. This deciding match was far more dramatic. Wacker's top scorer in 1942, Ernst Reitermaier, provided the Meidlingers with an early lead, but Pepi Stroh equalized for the Violets shortly thereafter. After Hahnemann gave Meidling the advantage once more, the lead changed hands to Austria just minutes later thanks to a brace from Dolfi Huber. Finally, a further two goals each from Reitermeier and Hahnemann in the final minutes of the match made the final score 4:3 in favor of Wacker in front of 35,000 spectators at the Praterstadion. The trophy was then presented to the winning team by Federal Chancellor Leopold Figl. In addition to the two players who scored two goals each, Pelikan and Wacker fielded a defensive line comprising Virius and Marischka, a midfield trio of Macho, Hanappi, and Brinek, and a forward line of Gerhard Hanappi, Licker, Kalcik, and Strobl. The latter trio was particularly lauded in the press, with Hanappi, in particular, being hailed as a promising talent.

Championship 1947
1. Wacker		30 points
2. Rapid		28 points
3. Vienna		27 points
Cup 1947
Wacker	4:3	Austria
Reitermaier 30' Hahnemann 65' Reitermaier 83' Hahnemann 86'		45' Stroh 74' Huber 75' Huber

=== 1948-1956: Championship and Centropacup runner-up title ===
After winning the double, Meidling were unable to defend or regain the title under new coach Edi Frühwirth, who brought the World Cup system to Meidling. The championship once again turned into a duel with Rapid. Wacker's 1–0 win over Sportclub in the final match of the season meant that Rapid had to win at least one point in their final match against Austria the following day. The 45,000 spectators at the Prater Stadium on June 6, 1948, included the entire Wacker team as well as many black and white fans. Austria quickly took the lead and after 60 minutes the score was 2–0 in favor of the Violets. But a goal by Knor put Rapid back in front 2–1, and just before the end of the game, the referee awarded a penalty to Rapid, Robert Körner stepped up and scored, making Rapid champions and Wacker runners-up. In addition to these direct and indirect duels, the transfer of Wacker legend Gerhard Hanappi to Rapid in 1950 added fuel to the fire, and many Wacker fans swore eternal enmity. After a fourth place and a third place, Wacker took the championship again in 1951. With Ernst Bokon, Richard Brousek, Walter Haummer and Turl Wagner, the club had one of the strongest attacks of the season, scoring exactly 100 goals in just 24 games for the Meidlingers. But once again, there was no way past Rapid, who scored 133 times. As runners-up, however, the club qualified for the Centro Cup, an attempt to revive the famous Mitropokal of the interwar years. Wacker made it to the final, where they again faced league rivals Rapid. In the semifinals, they were beaten 4–1 by Yugoslavian Cup winners Dinamo Zagreb. In the final on June 5, 1951, Wacker twice took the lead, but eventually lost 3–2.

In 1953, Wacker finished as runners-up for the sixth time, just one point behind Austria, this time scoring 101 goals in just 26 games. The decisive match of the championship came in the 24th round on June 7, 1953, in a head-to-head encounter between the two title rivals. In front of 45,000 fans at the Prater Stadium, the Meidlingers could only manage a 1–1 draw; a win would have secured the title. In the championship final, they did manage a 7–2 away win over SK Sturm Graz, but the Austrians went on to defeat Grazer SC 12–3. In the same year, Turl Brinek was called up to the FIFA World Cup squad, but this resulted in a move to AS Monaco. In 1954, Wacker finished third and Franz Pelikan, Walter Kollmann, Walter Haummer and Turl Wagner went to the World Cup in Switzerland, where Austria finished third, with the latter scoring three goals in the quarterfinals against Switzerland. After a fourth-place finish in 1955, the Meidling team entered the title race for the last time in the 1955/56 season. Meidling led the league for 28 weeks before facing Austria on the final matchday at the Praterstadion. Their closest rivals were once again Rapid, but this time they had to hope that Meidling would make a mistake. In the decisive match against Austria, Wacker quickly took the lead, but still lost 3–1. Three shots on goal and a missed penalty added to the disappointment - Rapid were champions, Wacker only second for the seventh time. Nevertheless, Wacker's president, Alfred Frey, made sporting history that year: On March 18, 1956, he submitted a proposal to UEFA for the introduction of a European Cup Winners' Cup competition, which was eventually introduced in 1960.

=== 1956-1971: Relegation fight and merger with Admira ===
After failing to win the championship in 1956, SC Wacker Wien fell into financial difficulties. In the 1957 and 1958 seasons, the club did well on the field, finishing fourth twice, and Walter Kollmann and the brothers Ernst and Paul Kozlicek represented Wacker at the 1958 World Cup in Sweden. However, sporting success could no longer hide the company's financial shortcomings: In the fall championship of the 1958–59 season, several players - Pelikan, Hager, Schrottenbaum, Wagner I, Wagner II and Kozlicek II - refused to play in the championship match against Grazer AK. The reason was that the club was not able to pay the 100 Schilling bonus for a practice game. Although the strikers were severely punished, their departure from the club led to a significant weakening of the sport. When the team was in need, Hahnemann, now the coach of the Black and Whites, even had to substitute himself in a championship game against Vienna. Despite his 45 years, he scored a goal in that game. In the "strike season", the club ended up in eighth place, and SC Wacker was already relegated in 1961, although they were only one point behind non-relegated SV Schwechat and 1. Simmeringer SC in the final standings. The decisive match against Vienna in the last round was lost 2–0 in front of 8,000 spectators. After the first relegation in the club's history, the Meidlingers immediately took first place in the Regionalliga Ost, the second tier of the Austrian Bundesliga, and were promoted back to the Bundesliga in 1962. Once again, however, they fell one point short of staying in the league, this time losing the decisive away match to Wiener Sport-Club 4–2 at the Red-Star-Platz on June 16, 1963. A low point of the season was the abandonment of the home game against Grazer AK on October 7, 1962, with a score of 1:2 in the 83rd minute due to blatant spectator riots, which resulted in a 0:3 defeat (sources: "Arbeiterzeitung Wien" of October 9, 1962 ff). Another championship in the Regionalliga Ost in 1963/64 brought a return to the Austrian Bundesliga, where at the end of the season on June 20, 1965, the team was already 5 points short of staying in the top division. The picture remained the same for the Meidlinger: again champion of the Ost in 1966, again relegation in 1967, but the exit from the championship, now called National League, was extremely dramatic: this time, with 18 points each, only the worse goal ratio (28:50) compared to SK Sturm Graz (32:47) was decisive, whereby in the final round on June 24, 1967, even a 6:1 home match over bottom club SV Kapfenberg and the fact that Grazer AK won the Graz derby 1-0 did not help. With a nine-point lead, the almost obligatory victory in the second division was achieved again (1967/68), and Wacker changed levels for the eighth time in the eighth season.

This to-and-fro between the two leagues is probably unique in Austrian soccer history and tested the endurance of the fans. Attendance figures of up to 12,500 fans in those years were only exceeded by a few clubs such as Rapid or LASK. After avoiding relegation for two seasons, Wacker finished below the red line for the fifth time in ten years in 1971. In addition to sporting and financial problems, there were also difficulties with the stadium in Rosasgasse. The club decided to merge with Admira Energie from Maria Enzersdorf to form FC Admira/Wacker, which was based in Maria Enzersdorf, Lower Austria, at the Bundesstadion Südstadt. This merger was the result of numerous negotiations with various clubs: after relegation in 1966, Wacker was supposed to merge with SV Schwechat and move to Lower Austria, but this was prevented. Wacker's last championship match, not only in Austria's top league, but forever, was against FC Wacker Innsbruck on June 19, 1971 (2–4). Ernst Dokupil scored the final goal for the Black and Whites in the 79th minute, making the final score 2–4. However, the cameras of the reporters in attendance were focused on the visitors from Innsbruck, who were crowned Austrian champions for the first time.

=== 1971-1973: Epilogue in Brunn am Gebirge ===
If one continues to follow the second division license of Wiener Wacker in 1971, it was initially given to FC Wacker/Admira, the second team of the new merged club FC Admira/Wacker (note the reverse order of the former club names). Although FC Wacker/Admira managed to stay in the second division of Regionalliga Ost with a lead over ASV Siegendorf, the first team to be relegated, they agreed to a joint venture with Brunn am Gebirge, known as Wacker Brunn, on July 5, 1972. Brunn am Gebirge managed to avoid relegation to the Lower Austrian Regional League, but on September 13, 1973, they ended the partnership, which meant the end of an independent "Wacker". In its only season, the club had finished 7th out of 14 teams in the regional league.

== Stadium and courts ==
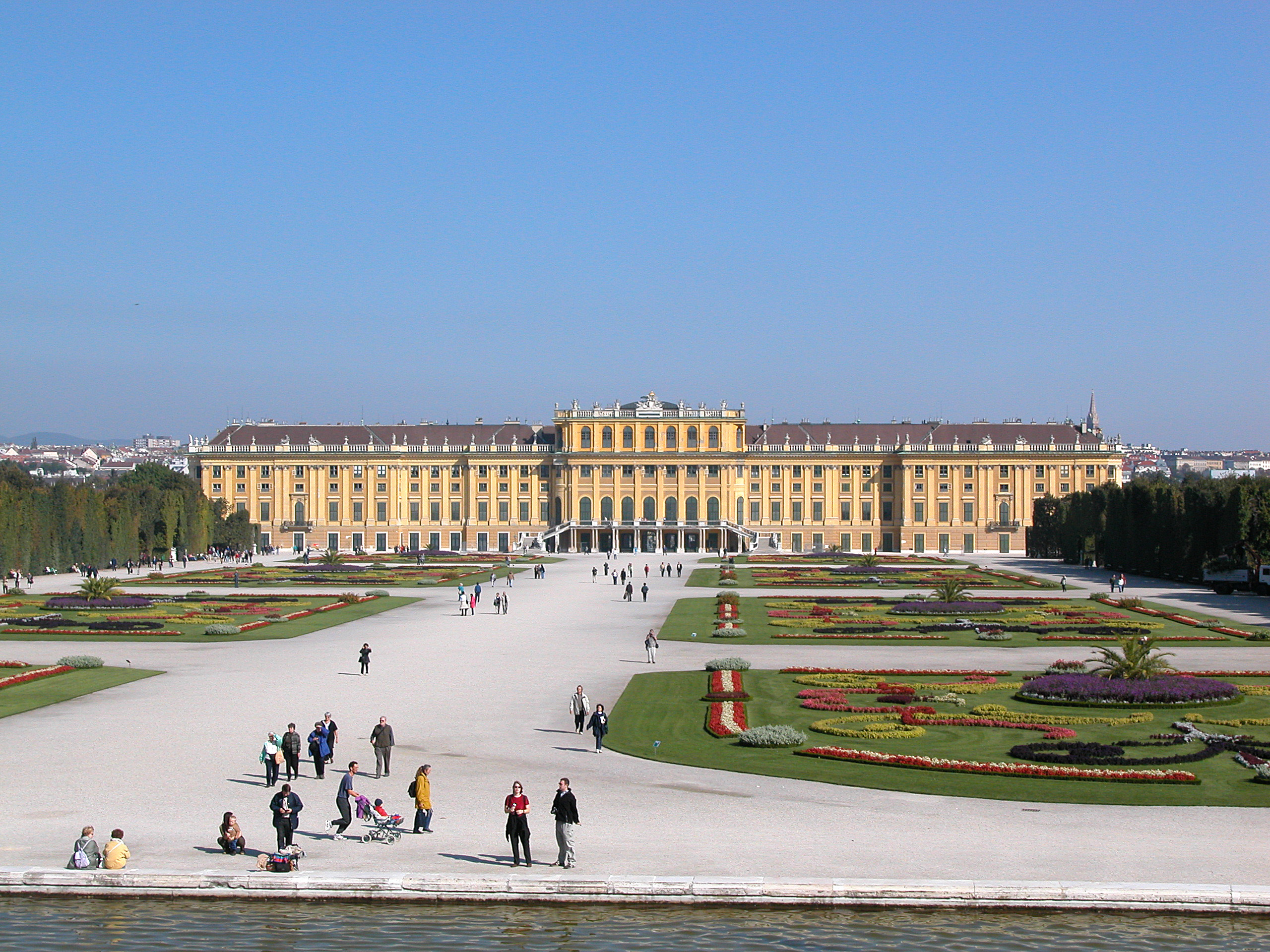
The proximity of the Wacker stadium to the palace gave the team the nickname "Schönbrunner".

Wacker found its first permanent home in the "Sandgrube", owned by innkeeper Nitsch. Nitsch made his inn available to the club as a club room and allowed the club to build a soccer field on the adjacent property in Edelsinnstraße. The club made its debut on the new pitch in 1909, but lost 3–1 to Hertha in the opening match. Wacker's growing popularity after World War I meant that the club had to move to larger stadiums to accommodate the majority of fans. The construction of a new stadium with a capacity of 20,000 spectators was initiated. The only unused site in Meidling was the so-called "Wildpark" near Schönbrunn, which the club was able to acquire after lengthy negotiations.

The plans for the new stadium were drawn up by engineer Gold, and the construction work was carried out by the firm of Josef Takacs. The grand opening took place on October 8, 1921; the stadium at Rosasgasse eventually had standing room for 17,000 spectators and seating for 3,000. The first opponent was the old rival Hertha. However, the match had to be abandoned in the 28th minute at a score of 1:1 due to a heavy thunderstorm, and the opening was postponed to the following day, October 9, 1921. The invited team was SK Moravská Slavia from Brno, who were defeated 4–2. National player Johann Kowanda, who had already scored against Hertha, scored three goals. The team's location near Schönbrunn Palace soon earned them the nickname "Schönbrunner". Wacker remained in Rosasgasse until their demise in 1971; the pitch still exists today, though the auditorium no longer does. It is available for school sports as the "Bundesspielplatz Schönbrunn" (Wackerplatz).

== Trainer ==
- Hungary Jenő Kalmár (1957–1958)

Double '47

== Players ==
30s

Three players stand out in the history of Wacker and have played a major role in the success of Austrian football: Karli Zischek became a Wacker legend in the 1930s. He was a member of the first Wacker team for almost twenty years, and also played in the 1947 national team. To this day, the striker is one of the top 10 scorers in the national team, and he became famous as the right winger of the Wunderteam. Turl Wagner followed in his footsteps as a top scorer for the '47 team. He made his grand entrance in the heat of Lausanne, the 1954 World Cup quarterfinal against Switzerland, where he scored three goals for Austria. They later finished 3rd. He is also one of the top 10 scorers for the Austrian national team. At that time, however, another Meidling footballer was making a name for himself: Gerhard Hanappi. The former record-breaking Austrian international was named one of the 50 best European footballers of the 20th century by the IFFHS.

In addition to Karli Zischek, two other Wacker players earned double-digit caps between the wars. One of them was the chubby Leopold Resch, who also played in the 1923 Cup final. He is described as a player who combined an athletic style of play with a wide range of movement and a mature technique. The famous striker Hansi Horvath also spent three seasons in Meidling in the 1930s. In addition to Turl Wagner, Admira import Willy Hahnemann made a name for himself internationally for Austria in the post-war championship. Wacker player Walter Haummer also made a name for himself as a striker for the national team. In midfield, Turl Brinek, known for his long-range shots, also shone alongside Hanappi. Defender Walter Kollmann made a name for himself with his speed and commitment. The last Wacker players to play for the national team were brothers Ernst and Paul Kozlicek, who played together in the '58 World Cup.

Austrian national players:

- Theodor Brinek
- Theodor Brinek Jr.
- Richard Brousek
- Karl Cart
- Ferdinand Feigl
- Otto Fischer
- Ernst Foreth
- Alfred Gager
- Wilhelm Hahnemann
- Gerhard Hanappi
- Franz Hanreiter
- Walter Haummer
- Rainer Hinesser
- Walter Horak
- Johann Horvath
- Franz Jellinek
- Adalbert Kaubek
- Walter Kollmann
- Johann Kowanda
- Paul Kozlicek
- Ernst Kozlicek
- Josef Pekarek
- Franz Pelikan
- Karl Rappan
- Leopold Resch
- Franz Twaroch
- Turl Wagner
- Johann Walzhofer
- Josef Wana
- Karl Zischek
- Friedrich Zwazl

Top scorers
- 1942 Ernst Reitermaier: 20 goals
- 1955 Richard Brousek: 31 goals
Austria's footballer of the year
- 1950 Gerhard Hanappi

Called up to the FIFA world team

- 1953 Theodor Brinek Jr.

== Meidling and its Schönbrunn residents - attempts at revitalization ==
For decades, Wacker was the figurehead of Meidling and made the "twelfth blow" famous throughout the country. The history of the club, which no longer exists, is featured prominently in the Vienna district museum of Meidling, where former players such as Ernst Reitermaier were involved. Soon after Wacker's departure and the merger, several attempts were made to revive the club.

The first attempt to re-establish SC Wacker Wien was made with Wacker 72, but this club only played in the Vienna lower leagues and was absorbed by ASK Liesing. Another attempt in the 1980s was crowned with temporary success: Under the traditional name of Wacker Wien, the new club at least managed to make headlines in the local press. In an effort to get the name Wacker back on the top flight scoresheet, Wacker Wien played in the fourth division of the Vienna City League in the 1987/1988 season and finished third. After merging with Groß Viktoria to form Wacker/Groß Viktoria, the club was promoted to the third division of the Regionalliga Ost a year later. But the rise was too fast, and financial problems brought the new Wacker to its knees. Three rounds before the end of the season, chairman Anton Cupak announced that despite a good mid-table position, the club would be voluntarily relegated and part ways with Viktoria.

Wacker then spent a few more years in the fourth-tier Vienna City League and even won the Vienna Soccer Cup in 1995, beating Gersthofer SV 4–2 in the final. This was certainly the most curious chapter in Wacker's history. After the newly founded club was forced to close its doors, Wacker Vienna moved to the small market town of Lichtenwörth in Lower Austria. In fact, the local ASK Lichtenwörth temporarily played as SC Wacker-Wien-Lichtenwörth from November 26, 1999. Another attempt to revive SC Wacker Wien was made in 2005: The newly founded club plays its matches at Wiener-Viktoria-Platz under its traditional name. In the 2009–10 season, Wacker won the championship in Austria's lowest division (Wiener 3. Klasse) and played in the second lowest division (Wiener 2. Klasse) from the 2010–11 season. However, on October 9, 2012, the club merged with Borussia Hetzendorf, which brought this attempt to an abrupt end. In 2018, SC Wacker Wien was revived: The newly formed club won promotion to the 1. Klasse A (Austria's seventh highest division) by finishing runner-up in the 2. Klasse A (Austria's eighth highest division), but had to abandon the championship midway through the season due to the COVID-19 pandemic. After the restart, the team won the championship and was promoted to Oberliga A.

== Titles and achievements ==
=== Mitropa Cup ===
- 1 × Centro Cup finalist: 1951

=== Austrian Football Championship ===
- 1 × Austrian champion: 1947
- 8 × Austrian runners-up: 1939, 1940, 1941, 1945, 1948, 1951, 1953, 1956
- 7 × Austrian second division champions: 1912, 1913, 1914 (second division), 1962, 1964, 1966, 1968 (Regionalliga Ost)

=== Austrian and German Cup ===
- 1 × Austrian Cup winner: 1947
- 1 × Austrian Cup finalist: 1923
- 1 × German Cup semi-finalist: 1940

== Bibliography ==
Club stories

- F. Blaha: 40 Jahre S.C. Wacker, Austrian press and picture publisher Blaha, Vienna 1947

Sketches of the club's history

- „Wacker“ in Leo Schidrowitz: Geschichte des Fußballsportes in Österreich, Publisher Rudolf Traunau, Vienna 1951
- Various authors (including Turl Wagner): SC Wacker, Beiträge zur Geschichte des Meidlinger Traditionsvereins, Sheets of the Meidling District Museum, Vienna 2000, issue 52.

Important sources on soccer at the time

- Wilhelm Schmieger: Der Fußball in Österreich, Burgverlag, Vienna 1925
- Leo Schidrowitz: Geschichte des Fußballsportes in Österreich, Publisher Rudolf Traunau, Vienna 1951
- Karl Langisch: Geschichte des Fußballsports in Österreich, Wilhelm Limpert-Publisher, Vienna 1964
- Karl Kastler: Fußballsport in Österreich, Von den Anfängen bis in die Gegenwart, Trauner, Linz 1972
- Karl Heinz Schwind: Geschichten aus einem Fußball-Jahrhundert, Ueberreuter, Vienna 1994
- Josef Huber: Tagebuch des Jahrhunderts, Fußball-Österreich von 1901 bis 2000, Publisher Wolfgang Drabesch, Vienna 2000

Statistics

- Anton Egger, Kurt Kaiser: Österreichs Fußball-Bundesliga von A-Z, Chronik ab 1974, Publisher Anton Egger, Fohnsdorf 1995
