= 1943 Tschammerpokal final =

- Match programme cover
- Event: 1943 Tschammerpokal
LSV Hamburg	First Vienna
2	3
- After extra time
- Date: 31 August 1943
- Venue: Adolf-Hitler-Kampfbahn, Stuttgart
- Referee: Emil Schmetzer (Mannheim)
- Attendance: 45,000

The 1943 Tschammerpokal final decided the winner of the 1943 Tschammerpokal, the 9th season of Germany's knockout football cup competition. It was played on 31 August 1943 at the Adolf-Hitler-Kampfbahn in Stuttgart. First Vienna won the match 3–2 against LSV Hamburg after extra time, to claim their 1st cup title.

== Route to the final ==
The Tschammerpokal began the final stage with 34 teams in a single-elimination knockout cup competition. There were a total of five rounds leading up to the final. In the qualification round, all but two teams were given a bye. Teams were drawn against each other, and the winner after 90 minutes would advance. If still tied, 30 minutes of extra time was played. If the score was still level, a replay would take place at the original away team's stadium. If still level after 90 minutes, 30 minutes of extra time was played. If the score was still level, a second replay would take place at the original home team's stadium. If still level after 90 minutes, 30 minutes of extra time was played. If the score was still level, a drawing of lots would decide who would advance to the next round.

Note: In all results below, the score of the finalist is given first (H: home; A: away).

LSV Hamburg		Round	First Vienna
Opponent	Result	1943 Tschammerpokal	Opponent	Result
Cuxhavener SV (A)	3–1	Qualification round	Bye
SpVgg Wilhelmshaven (H)	1–0	Round 1	NSTG Brüx (A)	14–0
LSV Pütnitz (A)	3–2	Round of 16	Breslauer SpVg 02 (H)	6–5
Holstein Kiel (A)	4–2	Quarter-finals	1. FC Nürnberg (A)	3–2
Dresdner SC (H)	2–1	Semi-finals	Schalke 04 (A)	6–2

== Match ==
=== Details ===
31 August 1943
14:30 CET

LSV Hamburg	2–3 (a.e.t.)	First Vienna
Heinrich 26'; Gornick 70'	Report	Decker 49' (pen.); Noack 53', 113'

Adolf-Hitler-Kampfbahn, Stuttgart
Attendance: 45,000
Referee: Emil Schmetzer (Mannheim)

LSV Hamburg	First Vienna

GK	1	(Germany) Willy Jürissen
RB		(Germany) Karl Miller
LB		(Germany) Reinhold Münzenberg
RH		(Germany) Walter Ochs
CH		(Germany) Heinrich Gärtner
LH		(Germany) Robert Gebhardt
OR		(Germany) Heinz Mühle
IR		(Germany) Ludwig Janda
CF		(Germany) Willi Gornick
IL		(Germany) Reinhardt Heinrich
OL		(Germany) Jakob Lotz
Manager:
(Germany) Karl Höger

GK	1	(Germany) Hans Schwarzer
RB		(Germany) Otto Kaller
LB		(Germany) Karl Bortoli
RH		(Germany) Gottfried Gröbel
CH		(Germany) Ernst Sabeditsch
LH		(Germany) Richard Dörfel
OR		(Germany) Franz Holeschofski
IR		(Germany) Karl Decker
CF		(Germany) Richard Fischer
IL		(Germany) Rudolf Noack
OL		(Germany) Franz Widhalm
Manager:
(Germany) Fritz Gschweidl

Match rules

- 90 minutes.
- 30 minutes of extra time if necessary.
- Replay if scores still level.
- No substitutions.
