= FC Wacker München =

German football club

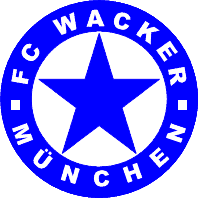
- Full name: Fußball-Club Wacker München e.V.
- Founded: 1903
- Ground: Bezirkssportanlage Demleitnerstraße
- League: Kreisliga München 2 (VIII)
- 2021–22: Kreisliga München 2, 2nd of 15
Home colours	Away colours

FC Wacker München is a German association football club of about 200 members based in the Sendling borough of Munich, Bavaria. At their zenith in the 1920s the Blue Stars twice reached the semi-finals of the German Championship. After World War II, the club spent a year in the first division play, but was primarily a third division side, then the highest amateur level in the country. Following its decline and near bankruptcy in the 1990s the club was reformed and has since then played in the lower amateur divisions. The term Wacker is German for brave.

== History ==
The club was formed in 1903 as FC Isaria München in the Munich quarter of Laim and later played as FC Wittelsbach and then FC München-Laim. In 1908, they joined the bicycling club Radsportclub Monachia and were officially called Fußball-Abteilung Wacker 1903 des SC Monachia (en: Football Department Wacker 1903 of SC Monachia). At the beginning of the 1913–14 season, the footballers left to join the gymnastics club Turnerschaft 1886 München and were called Fußballabteilung Turnerschaft Wacker 1886 München. In 1917, this union was dissolved and the club established itself as the independent side FC Wacker.

The first star of the team was the Austrian goalkeeper Karl Pekarna who played for Wacker in 1908 and 1909. He was named "Goalkeeper of the Year" in 1905 while playing in Scotland for Rangers F.C.. During these early years the club was primarily a first division side playing in the Süddeutscher Fußball Verband (en:South German Football League) where they captured the title in 1922. Wacker twice took part in national championship round play, advancing to the semi-final in 1922 where they were put out 0–4 by Hamburger SV, and again advancing to the semi-final in 1928, this time losing 1–2 to Hertha Berlin. The club's successes are closely associated with Alfréd Schaffer, one of the great stars of the early years of the game. He was Europe's top goalscorer in 1918 and 1919 while playing for MTK Budapest and is often considered the first professional player on the continent. He played for Wacker in 1921 and 1922 before serving as team coach at the end of the decade.

Logo of FC Wacker München ca. 1931

After the re-organization of German football into sixteen premier level divisions under the Third Reich in 1933, Wacker qualified for the Gauliga Bayern and played there until being relegated in 1938. Wacker returned to first division football in 1940 and remained there until 1945. However, the Blue Stars were never a serious contender for the division title. Following World War II, the team took up play in the Landesliga Bayern (II) and won promotion to the Oberliga Süd in 1947, only to be immediately relegated. In 1950, they qualified for the new second division 2nd Oberliga Süd and played two seasons there, returning for a third season in 1953. Until 1980, Wacker was for the most part a third division side, then Germany's highest amateur level, making single season appearances in the Regionalliga Süd (II) in 1964–65, 1970–71 and 1972–73. They qualified for Regionalliga play again in 1975, but declined the promotion for financial reasons. They slipped to the now fourth-tier Landesliga Bayern in 1980 and in 1995 were reorganized following financial difficulties. They remained in Landesliga play until being nearly bankrupted in 2004 through the fraudulent management of the club's finances. The club has since been part of the country's lowest divisions.

== Notable players and coaches ==
=== German internationals ===
A number of Wacker players were selected for the Germany national football team:

- Heinrich Altvater, one match for Germany in 1922
- Georg Ertl, seven matches for Germany from 1925 to 1927
- Wilhelm Falk, one match for Germany in 1927
- Josef Weber, one match for Germany in 1927
- Sigmund Haringer, 15 matches for Germany from 1931 to 1937, four of them while with Wacker

=== Others ===
- Karl Pekarna, Austrian international, 1908–09
- Alfréd Schaffer, Hungarian international, 1920–21
- Albert Eschenlohr, German international, ca. 1922
- Eugen Kling, German international, ca. early 1920s
- Péter Szabó, Hungarian international, late 1920s
- Ernst Poertgen, German international, 1939–42
- Friedrich Müller, German international, ca. mid-1930s
- Hennes Weisweiler, later famous coach, some time during World War II
- Hans Bauer, World Cup winner 1954, 1945–48
- Adolf Kunstwadl, former captain of Bayern Munich, 1967–74
- Dietmar Hamann, 59 matches for Germany, played for the club's youth side until 1989

=== Coaches ===
- Edward Hanney, English Olympics participant 1912, 1927–28
- Alfréd Schaffer, Hungarian international, ca. 1929–31
- Karl Mai, World Cup winner 1954, ca. 1969

== Honours ==
The club's honours:

- German championship
  - Semi-finals: (2) 1922, 1928
- Southern German championship
  - Champions: 1922
- Kreisliga Südbayern (I)
  - Champions: (2) 1921, 1922
- Amateurliga Bayern (II-III)
  - Champions: (6) 1946, 1958 (south), 1964, 1970, 1972, 1976
  - Runners-up: (4) 1953, 1963 (south), 1968, 1974
- Landesliga Bayern-Süd (IV)
  - Champions: (2) 1982, 1987
  - Runners-up: 1986
- 2nd Amateurliga Oberbayern B (IV)
  - Champions: 1962
- A-Klasse München 4 (X-XI)
  - Champions: (2) 2006, 2010
- Kreisklasse München 5
  - Champions: 2013

== Recent seasons ==
The recent season-by-season performance of the club:

Season	Division	Tier	Position
2003–04	A-Klasse München 5	X	3rd
2004–05	A-Klasse München 5	X	4th
2005–06	A-Klasse München 5	X	1st ↑
2006–07	Kreisklasse München 4	IX	10th
2007–08	Kreisklasse München 4	IX	9th
2008–09	Kreisklasse München 3	X	13th ↓
2009–10	A-Klasse München 4	XI	1st ↑
2010–11	Kreisklasse München 5	X	8th
2011–12	Kreisklasse München 5	X	5th
2012–13	Kreisklasse München 5	IX	1st ↑
2013–14	Kreisliga München 3	VIII	14th ↓
2014–15	Kreisklasse München 4	IX	3rd
2015–16	Kreisklasse München 4	IX	2nd ↑
2016–17	Kreisliga München 2	VIII	8th
2017–18	Kreisliga München 2	VIII	5th
2017–18	Kreisliga München 2	VIII	8th
2019–21	Kreisliga München 2	VIII	5th
2021–22	Kreisliga München 2	VIII	2nd
2022–23	Kreisliga München 2	VIII	

- With the introduction of the Bezirksoberligas in 1988 as the new fifth tier, below the Landesligas, all leagues below dropped one tier. With the introduction of the Regionalligas in 1994 and the 3. Liga in 2008 as the new third tier, below the 2. Bundesliga, all leagues below dropped one tier. With the establishment of the Regionalliga Bayern as the new fourth tier in Bavaria in 2012 the Bayernliga was split into a northern and a southern division, the number of Landesligas expanded from three to five and the Bezirksoberligas abolished. All leagues from the Bezirksligas onwards were elevated one tier.

↑ Promoted	↓ Relegated

== Women's team ==
Wacker was one of the pioneers of women's football in Germany commencing operations immediately after the German association permitted the sport in 1970. The women's football department of Wacker was moderately successful, achieving two one year stints in the top-level Bundesliga in 1992/93 and 1994/95. They left the club to form their own independent club in 1999, FFC Wacker München, becoming the first independent wonmen's football club in Bavaria. Since 2005 FFC Wacker co-operates with TSV 1860 München. They now play in Group South of the 2. Fußball-Bundesliga (women).

The Wacker women won the Bavarian Championship in the years 1991, 1992, 1994 and 2003 and the Bavarian Cup in 1992, 1994 and 1996.
