= Eigenstiller =

Eigenstiller is a surname occurring in Austria. Notable people with the surname include:

- Johann Eigenstiller (1943–2025), Austrian football player, brother of Kurt
- Kurt Eigenstiller (1928–2015), Austrian football player
