= Walter Joachim =

Walter Joachim may refer to:

- Walter Joachim (Austrian football player), (1901–1976)
- Walter Joachim (Canadian cellist), (1912–2001)
