= Theodor Brinek =

Theodor Brinek may refer to:

== Sports ==
- Theodor Brinek (footballer, born 1898), Austrian footballer
- Theodor Brinek Jr., Austrian footballer
