= Joseph Weber (disambiguation) =

Joseph Weber (1919–2000) was an American physicist.

Josef, Jozef, Joseph or Joe Weber may also refer to:

- Joseph Miroslav Weber (1854–1906), Czech composer and violinist
- Joe Weber (baseball) (1862–1921), Canadian outfielder
- Joseph N. Weber (1865–1950), Hungarian-born American labor union leader
- Joe Weber (vaudevillian) (1867–1942), American comedian
- Josef Weber (1898–1970), German footballer
- Josef Weber (1908–1985), German peace activist, recipient of 1983–84 Lenin Peace Prize
- Gerald Joseph Weber (1914–1989), American judge
- Joseph 'Jup' Weber (1950-2021), Luxembourgian Green and Liberal politician
- Jozef Weber (born 1970), Czech footballer

== Characters ==
- Josef Weber, key persona in 2013's The Storyteller (Picoult novel)

== See also ==
- Joe Webber (born 1993), New Zealand rugby player
