= Heinrich Altvater =

German footballer

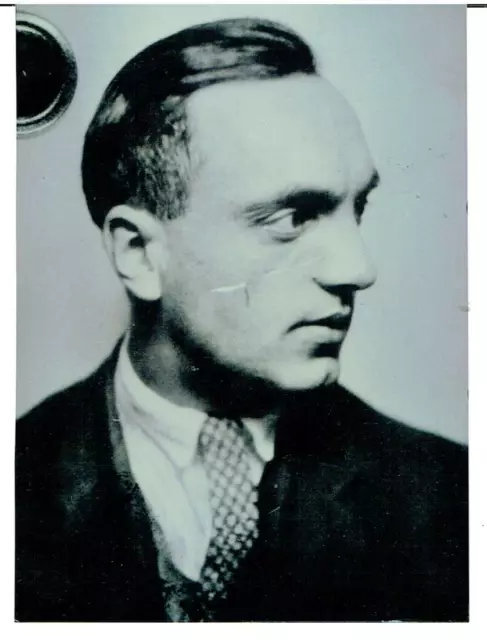

Personal information
- Date of birth: 27 August 1902
- Date of death: 25 February 1994 (aged 91)
- Position: Left wing

Senior career*
Years	Team	Apps	(Gls)
1921–1940	FC Wacker München		

International career
1922	Germany	1	(0)
- * Club domestic league appearances and goals

Heinrich Altvater (27 August 1902 – 25 February 1994) was a German club and international footballer.

== Club career ==
Heinrich Altvater started his career in 1921 for FC Wacker München. Playing with this team until he retired. He exclusively played left wing.

On 30 June 1940 at age 37 Heinrich Alvater retired from football.

== International career ==
Heinrich Altvater played one friendly match for his nation of Germany.

On 26 March 1922 Heinrich Altvater played his only match for Germany. The match was against Switzerland, hosted at Stadion am Riederwal in Frankfurt. The match was officiated by Willem Boas of Rotterdam. Heinrich Altvater made the starting eleven, playing in left wing. Despite a 2-0 lead after 90 minutes, the match ended 2-2. The match recorded an estimated 35,000 spectators.
