= Johann Eigenstiller =

Austrian footballer (1943–2025)

Personal information
- Date of birth: 17 June 1943
- Place of birth: Austria
- Date of death: 28 March 2025 (aged 81)
- Place of death: Tyrol, Austria
- Position: Defender

Senior career*
Years	Team	Apps	(Gls)
1961–1962	SK Vorwärts Steyr		
1962–1963	SK VÖEST Linz		
1965–1968	FC Wacker	85	(0)
1969–1970	Rapid Wien	24	(1)
1970–1978	SSW Innsbruck	216	(1)
1979–1981	IG Bregenz/Dornbirn		
1981–1984	FC Wildschönau		
1984–1985	SVG Reichenau		
1985–1986	FC Wacker Innsbruck (A)		

International career
1967–1975	Austria	37	(0)

Managerial career
- 1978: SSW Innsbruck
- * Club domestic league appearances and goals

Johann "Hans" Eigenstiller (17 June 1943 – 28 March 2025) was an Austrian professional footballer who played as a defender for SK Vorwärts Steyr, FC Wacker and Rapid Wien. At international level, he made 37 appearances for the Austria national team. On 28 March 2025, he died at the age of 81. His older brother Kurt was also a footballer.
