= Wilhelm Falk =

German footballer

Personal information
- Date of birth: 3 July 1898
- Date of death: 16 October 1961 (aged 63)
- Position: Defender

Senior career*
Years	Team	Apps	(Gls)
- FC Wacker München

International career
1927	Germany	1	(0)
- * Club domestic league appearances and goals

Wilhelm Falk (3 July 1898 – 16 October 1961) was a German international footballer.
