= Georg Ertl =

German footballer

Personal information
- Date of birth: 17 March 1901
- Date of death: 22 October 1968 (aged 67)
- Position: Goalkeeper

Senior career*
Years	Team	Apps	(Gls)
- FC Wacker München

International career
1925–1927	Germany	7	(0)
- * Club domestic league appearances and goals

Georg Ertl (17 March 1901 – 22 October 1968) was a German international footballer.
