= 1943 Tschammerpokal =

Tournament details
- Country: Germany
- Teams: 33

Final positions
- Champions: First Vienna
- Runners-up: LSV Hamburg

Tournament statistics
- Matches played: 32

The 1943 Tschammerpokal was the 9th season of the annual German football cup competition. It was the last time the tournament was held. After the war it was reconstituted as the DFB-Pokal. 32 teams competed in the final tournament stage of five rounds. In the final held on 31 October 1943 in the Kaiser-Adolf-Hitler-Kampfbahn (Stuttgart) First Vienna FC defeated LSV Hamburg 3–2 after extra time.

== Matches ==
=== Qualification round ===
15 August 1943
Cuxhavener SV	1–3	LSV Hamburg

=== First round ===
22 August 1943
BC Augsburg	3 – 0	FC Bayern Munich
TSG Rostock	1 – 7	Hertha BSC
SV Victoria Elbing	0 – 7	LSV Pütnitz
Dresdner SC	13 – 1	Reichsbahn SG Borussia Fulda
FV Saarbrücken	8 – 0	VfR Köln
SpVgg Breslau 02	5 – 3	TuS Lipine
FC Mühlhausen 93	1 – 4	VfR Mannheim
NSTG Brüx	0 – 14	First Vienna FC
SG SDW Posen	0 – 4	VfB Königsberg
Holstein Kiel	5 – 4	Eintracht Braunschweig
FK Niederkorn	0 – 3	Sportfreunde Katernberg
Stuttgarter Kickers	3 – 5	Kickers Offenbach
LSV Hamburg	1 – 0	SpVgg Wilhelmshaven
SpVgg Erfurt	0 – 4	FC Schalke 04
Zel Praga Warschau	3 – 5	MSV Brünn
KSG Schweinfurt	2 – 4	1. FC Nürnberg

=== Round of 16 ===
FC Schalke 04	4 – 2	Sportfreunde Katernberg
VfB Königsberg	0 – 5	Dresdner SC
First Vienna FC	6 – 5	SpVgg Breslau 02
Hertha BSC	0 – 3	Holstein Kiel
Kickers Offenbach	1 – 2	FV Saarbrücken
LSV Pütnitz	2 – 3	LSV Hamburg
MSV Brünn	1 – 5	1. FC Nürnberg
VfR Mannheim	4 – 2	BC Augsburg

=== Quarter-finals ===
Holstein Kiel	2 – 4	LSV Hamburg
FV Saarbrücken	1 – 2	FC Schalke 04	(AET)
1. FC Nürnberg	2 – 3	First Vienna FC
Dresdner SC	5 – 2	VfR Mannheim

=== Semi-finals ===
First Vienna FC	6 – 2	FC Schalke 04
LSV Hamburg	2 – 1	Dresdner SC

=== Final ===
31 August 1943
14:30 CET

LSV Hamburg	2–3 (a.e.t.)	First Vienna
Heinrich 26'; Gornick 70'	Report	Decker 49' (pen.); Noack 53', 113'

Adolf-Hitler-Kampfbahn, Stuttgart
Attendance: 45,000
Referee: Emil Schmetzer (Mannheim)
