= Fritz Eiberle =

German footballer

Personal information
- Date of birth: 17 September 1904
- Date of death: 22 September 1987 (aged 94)
- Position: Midfielder

Senior career*
Years	Team	Apps	(Gls)
- TSV 1860 München

International career
1933	Germany	1	(0)
- * Club domestic league appearances and goals

Fritz Eiberle (17 September 1904 – 22 September 1987) was a German international footballer.
