= Walter Kollmann =

Austrian footballer (1932–2017)

Personal information
- Full name: Walter Kollmann
- Date of birth: 17 June 1932
- Place of birth: Austria
- Date of death: 16 May 2017 (aged 84)
- Position: Defender

Senior career*
Years	Team	Apps	(Gls)
1951–1960	Wacker Wien		

International career
1952–1958	Austria	16	(0)
Medal record
Representing Austria
FIFA World Cup
Third place	1954 Switzerland
- * Club domestic league appearances and goals

Walter Kollmann (17 June 1932 – 16 May 2017) was an Austrian footballer.

== Career ==
During his club career he played for Wacker Wien. Kollmann earned 16 caps for the Austria national football team, and participated in the 1954 FIFA World Cup and the 1958 FIFA World Cup. He also represented Austria at the 1952 Summer Olympics.

== Personal life ==
On 26 May 1959, Kollmann crashed into two people in Vienna during a drunk driving incident, killing a woman and injuring a student. In November 1959, he was sentenced to ten months in prison.
