= Richard Beer =

Austrian footballer

Personal information
- Birth name: Richard Leopold Beer
- Date of birth: 3 January 1897
- Place of birth: Vienna, Austria-Hungary
- Date of death: 30 October 1973 (aged 76)
- Place of death: Vienna, Austria
- Position: Defender

International career
Years	Team	Apps	(Gls)
1920–1925	Austria	11	(0)

Richard Leopold Beer (3 January 1897 – 30 October 1973) was an Austrian footballer. He played in eleven matches for the Austria national football team from 1920 to 1925.
