= Rudolf Röckl =

Austrian footballer (1927–1976)

Personal information
- Date of birth: 12 January 1927
- Date of death: 2 November 1976 (aged 49)
- Position: Defender

Senior career*
Years	Team	Apps	(Gls)
- Wiener Sport-Club
–1960	First Vienna FC		
- 1. Wiener Neustädter SC

International career
1949–1956	Austria	24	(0)
- * Club domestic league appearances and goals

Rudolf Röckl (12 January 1927 – 2 November 1976) was an Austrian footballer who played as a defender. He made 24 appearances for the Austria national team from 1949 to 1956.
