= Rudolf Noack =

German footballer

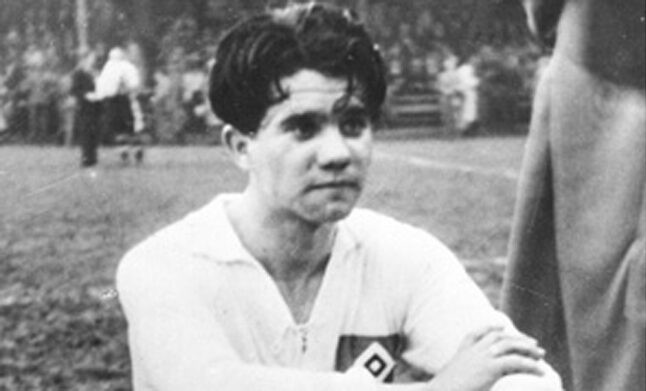
- Noack in the 1930s wearing the Hamburger SV kit

Personal information
- Full name: Rudolf Noack
- Date of birth: 30 March 1913
- Place of birth: Harburg, Prussia, German Empire
- Date of death: 30 June 1947 (aged 34)
- Place of death: Rakitianka, near Orsk, Russian SFSR, Soviet Union
- Positions: Forward; Playmaker

Youth career
- Herta 09 Harburg
- Rasensport Harburg

Senior career*
Years	Team	Apps	(Gls)
1931	SV Harburg		
1931–1942	Hamburger SV	178	(233)
1942–1944	First Vienna FC (guest)		
1944–1945	Hamburger SV		

International career
1934–1937	Germany	3	(1)
- * Club domestic league appearances and goals

Rudolf "Rudi" Noack (30 March 1913 – 30 June 1947) was a German footballer who played as a forward and playmaker. An attacking player for Hamburger SV, he participated in six Northern German championships between 1932 and 1945. As a wartime guest player with First Vienna FC, he won the Tschammerpokal in 1943 and two Austrian championships in 1943 and 1944. In HSV's official statistics from 1931 to 1945, Noack is credited with 193 league appearances and 233 goals.

== Early life ==
Noack grew up on the "Mopsberg" in Harburg, on the then Elisenstraße (today Baererstraße), where he played street football with neighbourhood children, including future HSV teammates Richard Dörfel and Friedo Dörfel. He came from a working-class background; his father was a labourer at the Phoenix rubber works. He began his youth football career at the ATSB club Herta 09 Harburg before moving to Rasensport Harburg and then, in 1931, to SV Harburg.

On his debut for SV Harburg, he scored five goals in a 6–4 victory over Victoria in the Northern Championship. This exceptional talent quickly became the talk of the city and a topic of interest at the Rothenbaum (HSV's home ground). For a time, Noack also went to sea as a sailor, during which period he acquired a tattoo on his upper arm. This tattoo was reportedly a factor that counted against his selection for the national team, and he was never permitted to roll up his sleeves far enough to reveal it.

== Club career ==
=== Hamburger SV (1931–1942) ===
In 1931, Noack joined HSV, where his Harburg neighbour Richard Dörfel had also transferred from Viktoria Harburg. He played an outstanding first season in 1931–32, scoring 36 goals in 18 league matches as HSV won the Oberliga Nord title with 34 points from a possible 36, before also claiming the Northern German championship. He was a four-goal scorer in both the 8–2 win over Eimsbütteler TV on 18 October 1931 and the 7–0 victory over FC St. Pauli on 31 January 1932.

In May 1932, he played his first two of an eventual 23 German football championship final-round matches (in which he scored 16 goals), appearing against VfL Benrath (3–1) and FC Schalke 04 (2–4). In June 1932, unemployed at the time, he and Richard Dörfel joined Kölner CfR. They returned in November 1932, but the Western German Football Association imposed a ban on both former Cologne players until April 1933. While Dörfel was released early and able to resume playing for HSV from 27 November 1932, Noack remained suspended until November 1933, only receiving an amnesty in time for the start of the 1933–34 season.

Playing as an inside-left forward, Noack typically assumed the role of playmaker. He was celebrated for his creativity and refined technique; the Hamburg public regarded him as a virtuoso of the kind they had never previously seen. He also had an unconventional character and was recognisable by his distinctive thick, dark hair, which earned him the nickname "der Schwarze" (the Black-Haired One).

The Fußball-Lexikon Hamburg records a remark attributed to Ernst Happel, who had seen Noack play several times as a wartime guest player for Vienna: that apart from Matthias Sindelar, Austria's most famous footballer of all time, Noack was better than the stars of the celebrated Wunderteam. The journalist Günther Rackow, writing in a history of the Northern German Football Association published in 2005, described Noack as the greatest footballer and technician ever to have played for HSV, and a representative of a typically southern European style of play.

==== Suspension (1940–1941) ====
In April 1940, Noack was expelled from the National Socialist League of the Reich for Physical Exercise (NSRL) for unspecified personal misconduct. He was barred from competition for the entirety of the 1940–41 season and managed only three league appearances (two goals) in 1939–40, returning to the HSV first team during the course of the 1941–42 season.

His former HSV colleague Rudolf Greifenberg later offered an alternative explanation for the repeated suspensions and ongoing disputes surrounding the popular player and crowd favourite: "Rudi was a fanatic about justice; he never let anything slide and he told Herberger exactly what he thought. Perhaps the bans had political reasons. We were neither of us communists, but we were against the Nazis; that was our reputation."

=== First Vienna FC (1942–1944) ===
During the Second World War, Noack rarely appeared for HSV. Following the transfer of his club colleague Richard Dörfel, Noack was posted to Vienna in October 1942. As a wartime guest player, alongside Dörfel, he joined First Vienna FC.

On 31 October 1943, in Stuttgart, Noack won the Tschammerpokal with First Vienna, defeating Luftwaffen-Sportverein Hamburg 3–2 after extra time. Playing alongside Richard Dörfel and Karl Decker, Noack scored twice, including the winning goal in the 113th minute. Four months earlier, with the same side, he had finished fourth in the final round of the 1942–43 German football championship. In total, he played six final-round matches for Vienna across the 1943 and 1944 championships, scoring three goals.

=== Return to HSV and final matches (1944–1945) ===
According to the statistical record compiled by Prüß and Irle, Noack played his last three competitive matches for HSV in November 1944, in the Gauklasse Hamburg, against FC St. Pauli (6–2), Victoria Hamburg (1–1) and Barmbeker SG (11–1). His teammates included Walter Warning, Erwin Seeler, Esegel Melkonian and Rudi Greifenberg.

Over his entire HSV career, he played 178 championship matches and 15 cup ties, scoring a total of 233 goals.

== International career ==
Noack won three caps for the Germany national football team, scoring one goal. He made his debut on 14 January 1934 in Frankfurt, in a 3–1 victory over Hungary, alongside fellow debutant centre-forward Edmund Conen. It was Germany's last match before their World Cup qualifier against Luxembourg on 11 March.

He was selected for the 1934 FIFA World Cup in Italy, together with Hans Schwartz of SC Victoria Hamburg as the Hamburg representatives. His sole appearance at the tournament came on 3 June in the semi-final against Czechoslovakia, a match Germany lost 1–3. Noack scored Germany's equaliser, making it 1–1 in the 62nd minute.

His final international appearance was on 2 May 1937 in Zürich, a 1–0 victory over Switzerland. The German forward line in Zürich comprised Ernst Lehner, Fritz Szepan, Jakob Eckert, Noack and Adolf Urban. A fortnight later, on 16 May, Germany beat Denmark 8–0 in Breslau, giving rise to the legend of the "Breslau-Elf"; for that match, Noack's place was taken by Rudolf Gellesch and Otto Siffling.

Despite his abilities, and a lifestyle that might have endeared him to the national coaches (he was a non-smoker and teetotaller), Noack was considered temperamental and headstrong, and he never became a regular under either Otto Nerz or Sepp Herberger.

== Representative football ==
With the Nordmark regional select team, Noack won the Reichsbundpokal final on 6 March 1938 in Erfurt, defeating the South-West side 3–1. The Northern attack lined up as Wilhelm Ahlers, Herbert Panse, Werner Höffmann, Noack and Gustav Carstens; Noack opened the scoring in the second half.

In the 1941–42 season, he led the Nordmark select team to the Reichsbundpokal final once more, with victories over Lower Silesia (3–0), Cologne/Aachen (6–0) and, in a replayed semi-final on 27 September 1942 in Hamburg, Brandenburg (4–1). He did not play in the final itself in November 1942. In total, he is recorded as having played 16 regional select matches, scoring 12 goals.

== Personal life ==
Noack, like his father, worked at the Phoenix rubber works in Harburg. For a period he served in the merchant navy.

== World War II and death ==
Noack was called up for military service and served as an anti-aircraft auxiliary (Flakhelfer), initially stationed at Mooswerder. Following his posting to Vienna in October 1942, he played for First Vienna FC alongside his wartime duties. He experienced the end of the war in Bohemia (Czechoslovakia). Holding the rank of Obergefreiter (corporal), he was captured by Soviet forces and taken as a prisoner of war.

Noack was one of approximately three million German soldiers held in Soviet captivity after the war. Rather than repatriating prisoners promptly, the Soviet Union retained an estimated 1.5 million as forced labour to aid post-war reconstruction, with no binding deadlines for their release.

Noack died in captivity on 30 June 1947, aged 34, at Rakitianka near Orsk in the Urals.

== Honours ==
Hamburger SV

- Northern German football championship: winner (multiple, 1932–1945)

First Vienna FC (wartime guest)

- Tschammerpokal: 1943
- Austrian championship: 1943, 1944

Nordmark regional select

- Reichsbundpokal: 1938
