= Roland Goriupp =

Austrian footballer

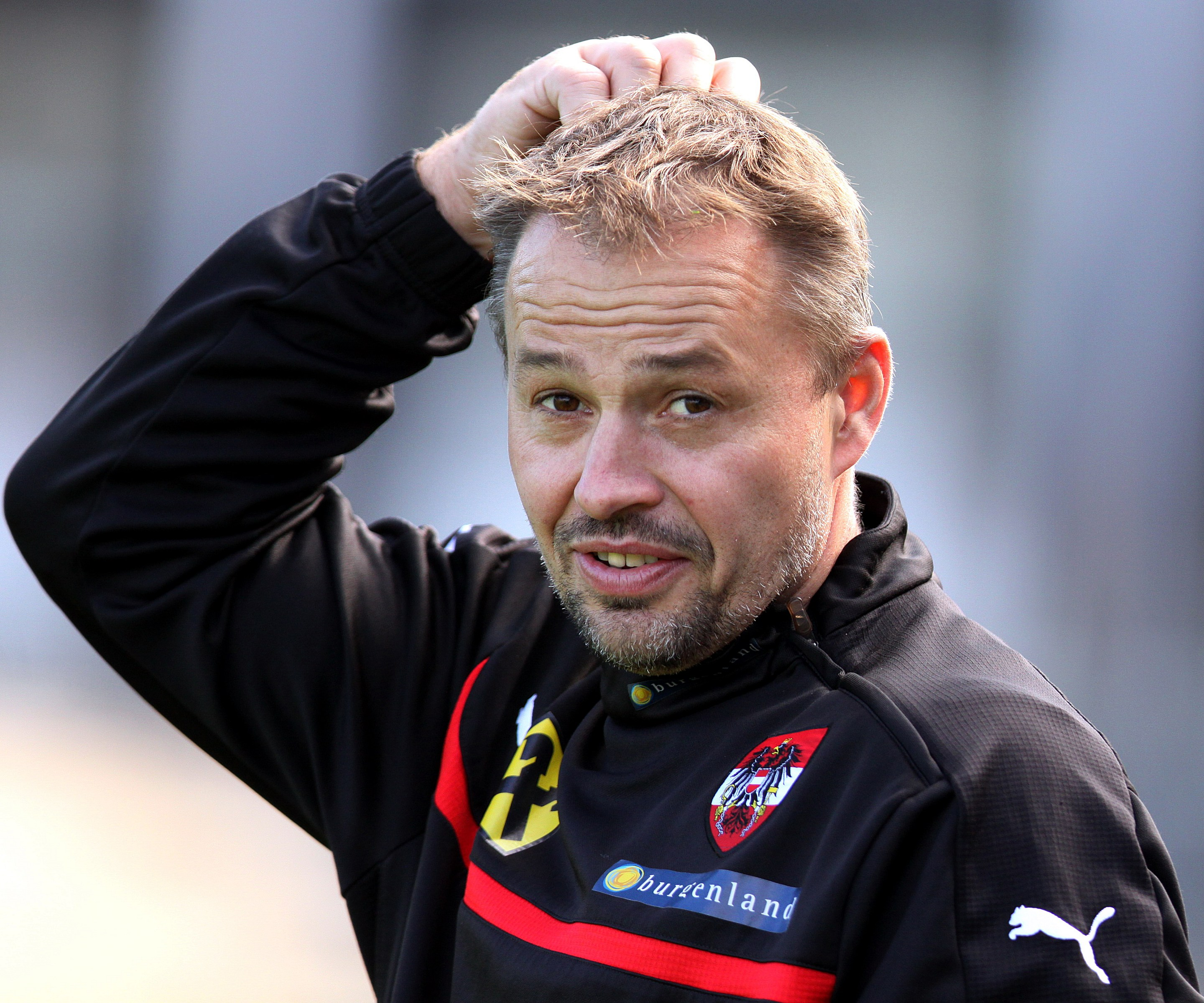

Personal information
- Date of birth: 24 April 1971 (age 55)
- Place of birth: Graz, Austria
- Height: 1.84 m (6 ft 1/2 in)
- Position: Goalkeeper

Youth career
- 1988–1993: Grazer AK

Senior career*
Years	Team	Apps	(Gls)
1993–1998	SK Sturm Graz	71	(0)
1998–2001	DSV Leoben	75	(0)
2001–2005	FC Kärnten	96	(0)
2005–2008	WAC St. Andrä	36	(0)
Total		220	(0)

International career
2002	Austria	1	(0)

Managerial career
- 1995–2000: Academy for Goalkeeper
- 1996–1998: Kids Camps
- 2007–2008: WAC St. Andrä (Director of Sport)
- 2008–: Grazer AK (Goalkeeper Coach)
- * Club domestic league appearances and goals

Roland Goriupp (born 24 April 1971 in Graz) is an Austrian retired football player.

== International career ==
Goriupp played his only game for Austria national football team in 2002 in a 2-6 loss to Germany.

== National team statistics ==
Austria national team
Year	Apps	Goals
2002	1	0
Total	1	0
