= Albert Eschenlohr =

German footballer

Personal information
- Date of birth: 10 March 1898
- Date of death: 9 December 1938 (aged 40)
- Position: Midfielder

Senior career*
Years	Team	Apps	(Gls)
- Tennis Borussia Berlin

International career
1924	Germany	1	(0)
- * Club domestic league appearances and goals

Albert Eschenlohr (10 March 1898 – 9 December 1938) was a German international footballer.
