= Karl Humenberger =

Austrian footballer and manager

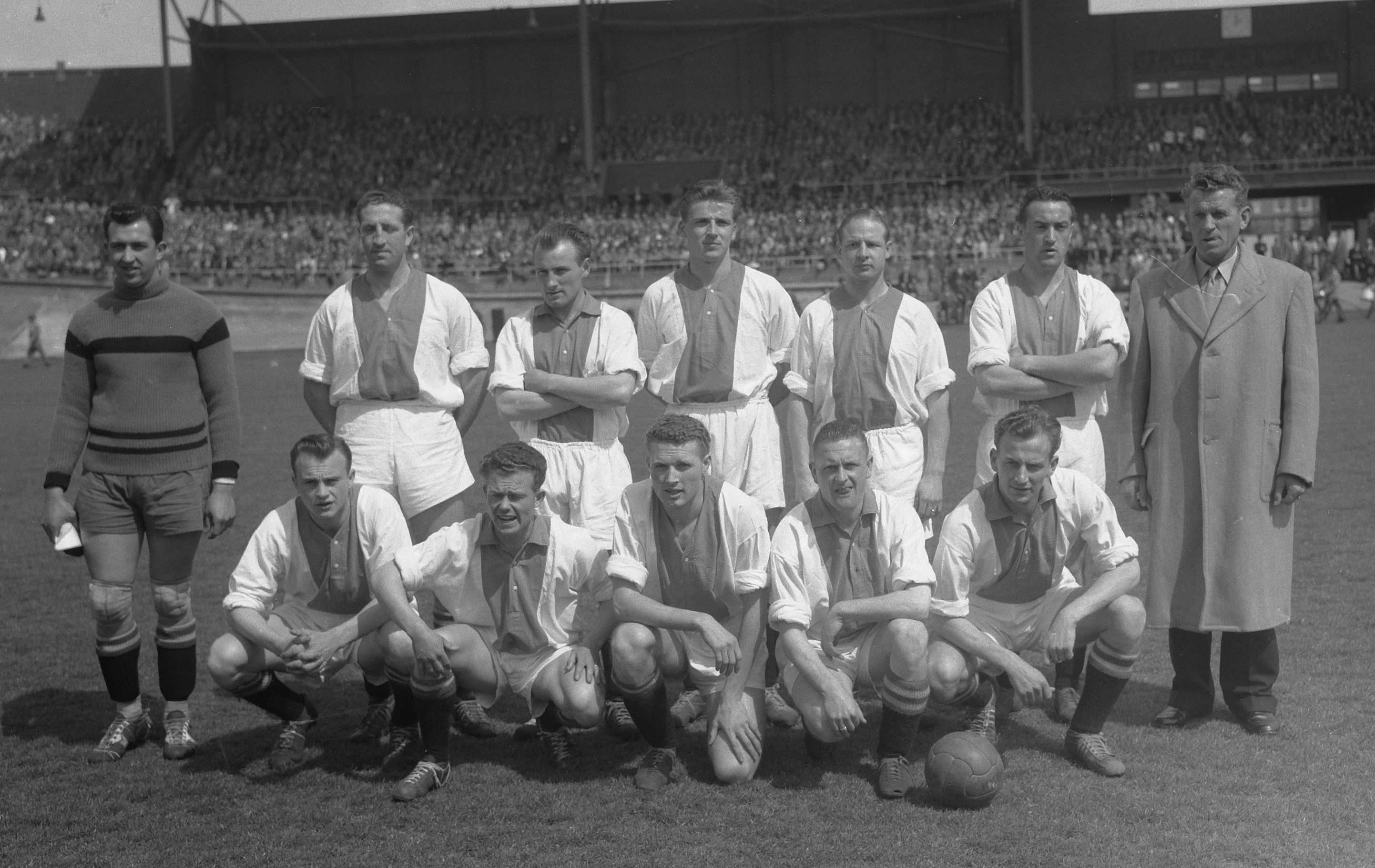
- Humenberger (standing right, with Ajax 1957)

Personal information
- Date of birth: 25 October 1906
- Place of birth: Vienna, Austria-Hungary
- Date of death: 28 December 1989 (aged 83)
- Height: 1.80 m (5 ft 11 in)
- Position: Midfielder

Senior career*
Years	Team	Apps	(Gls)
1926–1930	Floridsdorfer AC		
1930–1931	Admira Vienna		
1931–1932	FC Zürich		
1932–1936	Admira Vienna		
1936–1938	Strasbourg	41	(4)
1938–1939	Saint-Étienne	1	(0)

International career
1928	Austria	1	(0)

Managerial career
- 1952–1954: SC Ortmann
- 1954–1959: Ajax
- 1959: Austria Salzburg
- 1960–1961: Dordrecht
- 1961–1964: Royal Antwerp
- * Club domestic league appearances and goals

Karl Humenberger (25 October 1906 – 28 December 1989) was an Austrian association football player and manager, the brother of fellow player Ferdinand Humenberger.

== Club career ==
Born in Vienna, Humenberger played in Austria for Floridsdorfer AC and Admira Vienna, in Switzerland for FC Zürich, and in France for Strasbourg and Saint-Étienne.

== International career ==
Humenberger earned one cap for the Austrian national side in 1928.

== Coaching career ==
Humenberger managed in a number of European countries, including Austria (with SC Ortmann and Austria Salzburg), the Netherlands (with Ajax) and in Belgium (with Royal Antwerp). With Ajax, he won the championship in the first professional season (1956–57).

== Personal life ==
Karl was born in Vienna, the son of Auguste Stroh and Ferdinand Humenberger. He was married to Emilie Janata.
