= Franz Pavuza =

Austrian footballer (1920–1973)

Personal information
- Date of birth: 19 May 1920
- Date of death: 10 August 1973 (aged 53)

International career
Years	Team	Apps	(Gls)
1946–1947	Austria	7	(0)

Franz Pavuza (19 May 1920 – 10 August 1973) was an Austrian footballer. He played in seven matches for the Austria national football team from 1946 to 1947.
