= Karl Pekarna =

Austrian footballer (1881–1946)

Personal information
- Date of birth: 7 July 1881
- Place of birth: Oberlaa
- Date of death: 23 January 1946 (aged 64)
- Position: Goalkeeper

Senior career*
Years	Team	Apps	(Gls)
1900–1904	First Vienna FC		
1904–1905	Rangers	0	(0)
1905–1908	First Vienna FC		
1908–1910	FC Wacker München		
1910–1914	MTV München		
1918–1919	SK Slovan HAC		

International career
1904–1908	Austria	2	(0)

Managerial career
- 1920–1921: SG GFC Düren 99
- 1921: Alemannia Aachen
- 1923–1924: SK Slovan HAC
- * Club domestic league appearances and goals

Karl Pekarna (7 July 1881 – 23 January 1946) was an Austrian football player and a manager who played as a goalkeeper. He made two appearances for the Austria national team from 1904 to 1908.

== Career ==
Pekarna had a brief stint as a professional footballer with Scottish club Rangers, becoming the first footballer from mainland Europe to play in the United Kingdom.
