= Gustav Chrenka =

Austrian footballer

Personal information
- Date of birth: 4 July 1895
- Date of death: 1 September 1974 (aged 79)
- Position: Midfielder

International career
Years	Team	Apps	(Gls)
1914–1924	Austria	6	(0)

Gustav Chrenka (4 July 1895 – 1 September 1974) was an Austrian footballer. He played in six matches for the Austria national football team from 1914 to 1924.
