= Viktor Müller =

Bohemian-Austrian footballer

Personal information
- Full name: Viktor Müller
- Date of birth: 12 December 1886
- Positions: Goalkeeper; defender

Senior career*
Years	Team	Apps	(Gls)
1905–1908	SK Smíchov		
1910–1913	Wiener Sport-Club		

International career
1906–1907	Bohemia	3	(0)
1911–1912	Austria	5	(0)
- * Club domestic league appearances and goals

Viktor Müller (born 12 December 1886; date of death unknown) was a Czech-Austrian footballer who played as a goalkeeper or defender and appeared for both the Bohemia and Austria national teams.

== Career ==
Müller made his international debut for Bohemia as captain in the team's inaugural match on 1 April 1906 against Hungary, which finished as a 1–1 draw in Budapest. He earned three caps in total for Bohemia, all as a defender, making his final appearance on 6 October 1907 in Prague against Hungary, which finished as a 5–3 win, the national team's first victory. He later represented the Austria national team as a goalkeeper, making his first appearance on 7 May 1911 against Hungary, which finished as a 3–1 win in Vienna. He was capped five times for Austria, making his last appearance on 22 December 1912 against Italy, which finished as a 3–1 win in Genoa.

== Career statistics ==
=== International ===
Team	Year	Apps	Goals
Bohemia	1906	1	0
Bohemia	1907	2	0
Bohemia	Total	3	0
Austria	1911	3	0
Austria	1912	2	0
Austria	Total	5	0
Career total		8	0
