= Ernst Reitermaier =

German footballer and manager (1918–1993)

Personal information
- Full name: Ernst Reitermaier
- Date of birth: 26 December 1918
- Place of birth: Vienna, Austria
- Date of death: 4 May 1993 (aged 74)
- Place of death: Austria
- Position: Forward

Senior career*
Years	Team	Apps	(Gls)
1937–1951	SC Wacker Wien		
1951–1953	Vorwärts Steyr		

International career
1939	Germany	1	(0)

Managerial career
- 1957–1958: BC Augsburg
- * Club domestic league appearances and goals

Ernst Reitermaier (26 December 1918 – 4 May 1993) was an Austrian footballer and manager who played as a forward and made one appearance for the Germany national team.

== Career ==
Reitermaier was able to represent Germany internationally following the Anschluss. He earned his first and only cap on 27 August 1939 in a friendly against Slovakia. The away match, played in Bratislava, finished as a 0–2 loss.

== Personal life ==
Reitermaier died on 4 May 1993 at the age of 74.

== Career statistics ==
=== International ===
Germany
Year	Apps	Goals
1939	1	0
Total	1	0
