= Eugen Kling =

German footballer

Personal information
- Date of birth: 14 February 1899
- Date of death: 21 December 1971 (aged 72)
- Position: Defender

Senior career*
Years	Team	Apps	(Gls)
- TSV 1860 München

International career
1927	Germany	1	(0)
- * Club domestic league appearances and goals

Eugen Kling (14 February 1899 – 21 December 1971) was a German international footballer.
