= Erich Strobl =

Austrian footballer

Personal information
- Date of birth: 3 May 1933 (age 93)
- Position: Defender

Senior career*
Years	Team	Apps	(Gls)
1951–1961	Simmering	210	(34)
1961–1962	Austria Wien	31	(1)
1963–1966	Simmering	35	(3)

International career
1960–1962	Austria	5	(0)

Managerial career
- 1973–1974: Simmering
- * Club domestic league appearances and goals

Erich Strobl (born 3 May 1933) is an Austrian retired footballer and manager, known for his extensive period at Simmering.

== International career ==
He made his debut for Austria in a November 1960 friendly match away against Hungary and earned a total of 5 caps, scoring no goals. His final international was an April 1962 friendly away against Ireland.
