= Johann Schmid (footballer) =

Austrian footballer

International career
Years	Team	Apps	(Gls)
1912–1917	Austria	6	(0)

Johann Schmid was an Austrian footballer. He played in six matches for the Austria national football team from 1912 to 1917.
