= Heinrich Lenczewsky =

Austrian footballer

Personal information
- Date of birth: 19 May 1882
- Date of death: 12 February 1934 (aged 51)

International career
Years	Team	Apps	(Gls)
1906–1909	Austria	7	(0)

Heinrich Lenczewsky (19 May 1882 – 12 February 1934) was an Austrian footballer. He played in seven matches for the Austria national football team from 1906 to 1909.
