= Ferdinand Humenberger =

Austrian footballer (1897–1956)

Personal information
- Full name: Ferdinand August Humenberger
- Date of birth: 13 February 1897
- Place of birth: Vienna, Austria-Hungary
- Date of death: 13 May 1956 (aged 59)
- Place of death: Vienna, Austria
- Position: Midfielder

Senior career*
Years	Team	Apps	(Gls)
1918–1922	Floridsdorfer AC		

International career
1918	Austria	2	(0)

Managerial career
- 1923–1924: Treviso
- 1929–1930: KB
- 1930–1932: AIK
- 1935: Floridsdorfer AC
- * Club domestic league appearances and goals

Ferdinand Humenberger (13 February 1897 – 13 May 1956) was an Austrian professional football player and manager.

== Playing career ==
Humenberger played club football for Austrian side Floridsdorfer AC. He also played at international level for Austria, earning two caps in 1918.

== Coaching career ==
Humenberger coached Italian club Treviso between 1923 and 1924.

He is mentioned as a coach of Danish club KB around 1929 or 1930.

Humenberger was manager of Swedish side AIK between 1930 and 1932, winning the championship in 1932.

== Personal life ==
His brother Karl was also a professional football player and manager.
