= Franz Czernicky =

Austrian footballer

Personal information
- Date of birth: 16 September 1902
- Date of death: 16 June 1973 (aged 70)
- Position: Defender

International career
Years	Team	Apps	(Gls)
1927	Austria	1	(0)

Franz Czernicky (16 September 1902 – 16 June 1973) was an Austrian footballer. He played in one match for the Austria national football team in 1927.
