= Eduard Kanhäuser =

Austrian footballer

Personal information
- Date of birth: 18 September 1901
- Date of death: May 22, 1944
- Position: Goalkeeper

Senior career*
Years	Team	Apps	(Gls)
1921–1926	Wiener Sport-Club		

International career
1922–1925	Austria	9	(0)
- * Club domestic league appearances and goals

Eduard Kanhäuser, also known as Edi (born 18 September 1901-missing in action 22 May 1944) was an Austrian international footballer. Kanhäuser played as a goalkeeper for Wiener Sport-Club. His brother was fellow player Karl Kanhäuser.

== World War II and death ==
Kanhauser served as an Unteroffizier (Corporal) in the German Army in World War II. He was reported missing in action in Italy on 22 May 1944 aged 42 and is commemorated at the German Military Cemetery at Monte Cassino.
