= Karl Rumbold =

Austrian footballer (1893–1971)

Personal information
- Date of birth: 30 October 1893
- Place of birth: Vienna
- Date of death: 1971 (aged 77–78)
- Position: Defender

Senior career*
Years	Team	Apps	(Gls)
- First Vienna FC

International career
1913	Austria	1	(0)

Managerial career
- 1926–1927: Alemannia Aachen
- 1932–1933: Genoa
- 1933–1934: Alemannia Aachen
- * Club domestic league appearances and goals

Karl Rumbold (30 October 1893 – 1971) was an Austrian football player and manager. A defender, he played in one match for the Austria national team in 1913.
