= Josef Weber =

German footballer

Personal information
- Date of birth: 18 April 1898
- Date of death: 5 March 1970 (aged 71)
- Position: Midfielder

Senior career*
Years	Team	Apps	(Gls)
- FC Wacker München

International career
1927	Germany	1	(0)
- * Club domestic league appearances and goals

Josef Weber (18 April 1898 – 5 March 1970) was a German international footballer.
