= Volkan Kahraman =

Austrian footballer (1979–2023)

Personal information
- Date of birth: 10 October 1979
- Place of birth: Vienna, Austria
- Date of death: 8 February 2023 (aged 43)
- Place of death: Vienna, Austria
- Height: 1.79 m (5 ft 10 in)
- Position: Midfielder

Youth career
- 1987–1995: Austria Wien
- 1995–1997: Feyenoord

Senior career*
Years	Team	Apps	(Gls)
1997–2000	Feyenoord	1	(0)
1998–2000	→ Excelsior (loan)	42	(4)
2000–2001	Trabzonspor	0	(0)
2000–2001	→ Erzurumspor (loan)	11	(0)
2001–2003	SV Pasching	49	(4)
2003–2004	Austria Wien	7	(0)
2003	→ SV Salzburg (loan)	13	(0)
2004–2005	Skoda Xanthi	5	(0)
2005	LASK	9	(0)
2005–2006	SV Pasching	5	(0)
2005–2006	LASK	7	(1)
2006–2007	ASK Schwadorf	9	(0)
2006–2007	→ SC Eisenstadt (loan)	13	(3)
2007–2008	First Vienna	0	(0)
2008	FavAC	10	(1)
2009	UFC Purbach	12	(2)

International career
1996	Austria U16	3	(1)
1998–2001	Austria U21	25	(1)
2002	Austria	3	(0)

Managerial career
- 2011: 1. Simmeringer SC (caretaker)
- 2011: Beşiktaş Wien (player-coach)
- 2012–2013: 1. Simmeringer SC (sporting director)
- 2012–2013: 1. Simmeringer SC (caretaker)
- 2013: 1. Simmeringer SC (caretaker)
- 2013–2014: Beşiktaş Wien
- 2015: Sturm 19 St. Pölten
- 2015–2018: Karabakh Wien (sporting director)
- 2016–2018: Karabakh Wien
- * Club domestic league appearances and goals

Volkan Kahraman (10 October 1979 – 8 February 2023) was an Austrian football player and manager.

== Club career ==
Kahraman made his professional debut for Eredivisie side Feyenoord in November 1997 against De Graafschap and then scored 11 goals in 58 games on loan at city rivals Excelsior.

== International career ==
Born in Austria, Kahraman was of Turkish descent. He played for the Austria national team three times in 2002.

== Death ==
On 8 February 2023, Kahraman, aged 43, was shot and killed by his former friend, Orhan, in a murder-suicide after an argument broke out in Vienna, Austria.

== Career statistics ==
Appearances and goals by national team and year
National team	Year	Apps	Goals
Austria	2002	3	0
Total		3	0
