= Karl Ostricek =

Austrian footballer (1900–1930)

Personal information
- Date of birth: 10 December 1900
- Date of death: 7 May 1930 (aged 29)
- Position: Goalkeeper

International career
Years	Team	Apps	(Gls)
1921–1924	Austria	17	(0)

Karl Ostricek (10 December 1900 – 7 May 1930) was an Austrian footballer who played as a goalkeeper. He made 17 appearances for the Austria national team from 1921 to 1924.
