= Franz Urban =

Austrian footballer

International career
Years	Team	Apps	(Gls)
1914	Austria	2	(0)

Franz Urban was an Austrian footballer. He played in two matches for the Austria national football team in 1914.
