= Paul Schweda =

Austrian footballer (1930–2010)

Personal information
- Date of birth: 5 March 1930
- Date of death: 20 December 2010 (aged 80)
- Position: Goalkeeper

Senior career*
Years	Team	Apps	(Gls)
- Wiener AC
1949–1961	Austria Wien		

International career
1952–1953	Austria	3	(0)
- * Club domestic league appearances and goals

Paul Schweda (5 March 1930 – 20 December 2010) was an Austrian footballer who played as a goalkeeper for Austria Wien. He made three appearances for the Austria national team from 1952 to 1953.
