= 1. Simmeringer SC =

- Full name: 1. Simmeringer SC
- Founded: 1901
- Ground: Simmeringer Had
- Capacity: 5,000
- League: 2. Landesliga
- 2021–22: 1st (promoted to Wiener Stadtliga)

1. Simmeringer SC is an Austrian association football club from Vienna. The club was founded in 1901. It played in the Wiener Stadtliga.

== History ==
1. Simmeringer SC was founded in 1901 and played a role in the early Austrian leagues. Simmeringer finished 5th in the first-ever Austrian league in 1912. They achieved their greatest success in 1926, when they finished third in the top flight table.

In 1920, the club constructed the Simmeringer Had, a stadium with a capacity of around 40,000 people which ended up hosting a number of Austrian international matches.

1. Simmeringer SC also played in the top flight between 1951 and 1964. The club's biggest highlight during this period would be participation in the 1960 Mitropa Cup, an early international club competition, where they beat Ferencvárosi TC of Hungary 2:1 in the first leg in front of 60,000. However, they were defeated 5:1 at home to help consign Austria to last place in the Mitropa Cup table.

Relegation meant they could no longer maintain the large Simmeringer Had stadium and by 1970 had relocated to a smaller ground. By 1983, the club was functionally out of money and found themselves quickly relegated from the Bundesliga to the fourth division over the span of five years.

The club's best modern success occurred in 2001, when they reached the fourth round of the 1999–2000 Austrian Cup, defeating top flight SV Ried in the process.

The club played in the Eastern Regional League in 2012, but suffered financial problems that led to a restructuring of the club's finances. As a result, they ended up relegated to the top Viennese league, the fourth division. As of 2020, they play in the 2. Landesliga, the fifth division of Austrian football.

== Honours ==
- Austrian Regional League East
  - Champions (4): 1951, 1965, 1970, 1973

== Past managers ==
- Johann Hofstätter (1950–62)
- Tomislav Crnković (1965–66)
- Erich Strobl (1973–74)
- Rudi Flögel (1976–79)
- Johann Frank (1977–79)
- Ernst Dokupil (1979–83)
- Johann Frank (1983–85)
- Andreas Ogris (2001–02)
- Andreas Ogris (2005–06)
- Rudi Flögel (2007–08)
- Karl Brauneder (2008–10)
- Damir Čanadi (2010–11)
- Volkan Kahraman (2011)
- Romain Villiger (2012)
- Robert Kurka (2012)
- Christian Prosenik (2012)
- Volkan Kahraman (2012–)
