= Robert Pavlicek =

Austrian footballer

Personal information
- Date of birth: 31 May 1912
- Date of death: 22 January 1982 (aged 69)

International career
Years	Team	Apps	(Gls)
1933–1935	Austria	6	(0)

Robert Pavlicek (31 May 1912 – 22 January 1982) was an Austrian footballer. He played in six matches for the Austria national football team from 1933 to 1935.
