= Karl Kanhäuser =

Austrian footballer

Personal information
- Date of birth: 18 July 1900
- Place of birth: Vienna, Austria-Hungary
- Date of death: (declared) 31 December 1945
- Position: Striker

Senior career*
Years	Team	Apps	(Gls)
1919–1925	Wiener Sport-Club		
1925–1937	DFC Prag		

International career
1921–1924	Austria	5	(3)
1931	Czechoslovakia	2	(0)
- * Club domestic league appearances and goals

Karl Kanhäuser, also known as Karel Kannhauser (18 July 1900 – 31 December 1945 (declared)) was a footballer who played international football for both Austria and Czechoslovakia. Kanhäuser played as a striker for Wiener Sport-Club and DFC Prag. His brother was fellow player Eduard Kanhäuser.

== Personal life and death ==
Kanhauser renounced Austrian for Czechoslovak citizenship in 1931. Kanhauser continued to live in Prague with his family through the Second World War until in 1944 he was drafted in the Wehrmacht and deployed to Yugoslavia where he went missing in action. He was declared by the Vienna Regional Court to have died on 31 December 1945, five months on from his 45th birthday and seven months after the end of war in Europe.
