= Alfred Gager =

Austrian footballer (1942–2022)

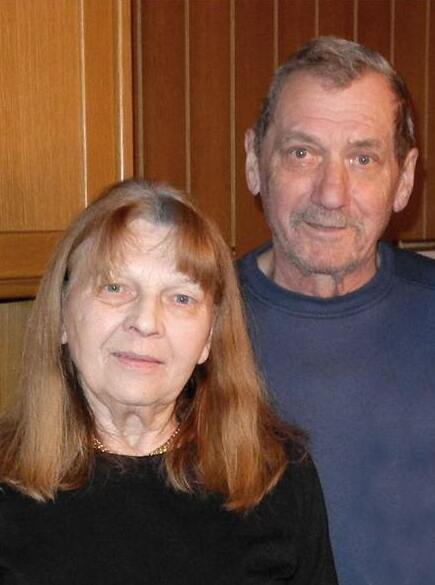
- Alfred Gager with Elly

Personal information
- Date of birth: 10 February 1942
- Place of birth: Vienna, Nazi Germany
- Date of death: 10 January 2022 (aged 79)
- Place of death: Obersiebenbrunn, Austria
- Position: Midfielder

Senior career*
Years	Team	Apps	(Gls)
1960–1966	Austria Wien		
1966–1967	Wacker Vienna		

International career
1962–1963	Austria	6	(0)
- * Club domestic league appearances and goals

Alfred Gager (10 February 1942 – 10 January 2022) was an Austrian footballer who played as a midfielder for Austria Wien and Wacker Wien. He made six appearances for the Austria national team from 1962 to 1963. Gager died on 10 January 2022, at the age of 79.
