= Otto Marischka =

Austrian-German footballer

Personal information
- Date of birth: 31 May 1912
- Date of death: 10 January 1991 (aged 78)
- Position: Defender

Senior career*
Years	Team	Apps	(Gls)
1934–1935	Favoritner SC		
1935–1947	Admira Wien		

International career
1939	Germany	1	(0)
- * Club domestic league appearances and goals

Otto Marischka (31 May 1912 – 10 January 1991) was an Austrian international footballer.
