= Johann Frank (footballer) =

Austrian footballer and coach

Personal information
- Date of birth: 14 May 1938
- Place of birth: Wien, Austria
- Date of death: 2 January 2010 (aged 71)
- Position: Defender

Senior career*
Years	Team	Apps	(Gls)
1955–1961	FC Wien		
1961–1966	1. Schwechater SC	152	(13)
1966–1971	Austria Vienna	91	(0)
1971–1972	Wiener Sport-Club		
1972–1975	1. Schwechater SC		

International career
1963–1967	Austria	7	(0)

Managerial career
- 1972–1975: 1. Schwechater SC
- 1975–1977: SC Neusiedl/See 1919
- 1977–1979: 1. Simmeringer SC
- 1981–1983: Wiener Sport-Club
- 1983–1985: 1. Simmeringer SC
- 1985–1986: SV Schwechat
- 1990–1991: ASV Vösendorf
- * Club domestic league appearances and goals

Johann Frank (14 May 1938 – 2 January 2010) was an Austrian football player and coach. He played for FC Wien, SC Schwechat and Austria Wien. He coached Schwechat and Neusiedl.
