= Josef Prager =

Austrian footballer

Personal information
- Date of birth: 15 November 1886
- Date of death: 1975 (aged 88–89)

International career
Years	Team	Apps	(Gls)
1904–1910	Austria	6	(0)

Josef Prager (15 November 1886 – 1975) was an Austrian footballer. He played in six matches for the Austria national football team from 1904 to 1910.
