= Franz Prohaska =

Austrian footballer

International career
Years	Team	Apps	(Gls)
1915–1917	Austria	5	(0)

Franz Prohaska was an Austrian footballer. He played in five matches for the Austria national football team from 1915 to 1917.
