= Ernst Sabeditsch =

Austrian footballer

Personal information
- Date of birth: 6 May 1920
- Date of death: 30 June 1986 (aged 66)
- Position: Midfielder

Senior career*
| Years | Team | Apps | (Gls) |
| 1938–1943 | First Vienna FC | | |
| 1943– | LSV Mölders Krakau | | |
| 1946–1950 | First Vienna FC | | |
| 1951 | Samarios | 16 | (0) |
| 1951–1953 | Wacker Wien | | |

International career
| 1939 | Germany | 1 | (0) |
| 1945–1947 | Austria | 7 | (0) |

Managerial career
- 1953–1955: LASK
- 1956–1957: FC Schaffhausen
- * Club domestic league appearances and goals

Ernst Sabeditsch (6 May 1920 – 30 June 1986) was an Austrian footballer and coach.

== Career ==
Sabeditsch had a spell in Colombia with Samarios during the 1951 season.
