= Walter Joachim (Canadian cellist) =

Canadian cellist and music teacher (1912–2001)

- Born: May 5, 1912; Düsseldorf, German Empire
- Died: December 20, 2001 (aged 89); Montreal, Quebec, Canada
- Occupations: Cellist, music teacher
- Relatives: Otto Joachim (brother)
- Awards: National Order of Quebec (1992); Order of Canada (1992); Prix Denise-Pelletier (1995)

Walter Joachim (May 5, 1912 – December 20, 2001) was a Canadian cellist, soloist, chamber musician, and music teacher from Quebec. Born in Düsseldorf, Germany, he was the brother of the composer Otto Joachim.

== Career ==
Joachim arrived in Canada in 1952 after living in Shanghai for a number of years to flee perscution by the Nazis back in Germany. He joined the Montreal Symphony Orchestra (OSM) in 1953, where he soon became principal cellist, a position he held until his retirement in 1979. He was also a member of the McGill Chamber Orchestra. In addition to giving numerous recitals on CBC radio and television, he was a co-founder and member of the Montreal String Quartet.

Joachim taught at the Conservatoire de musique du Québec à Montréal for more than 25 years, from 1952 to 1979. In the early 1980s, the onset of Parkinson's disease led him to concentrate on teaching. His students included more than 30 professional cellists working in Canada and abroad, among them Denis Brott, Guy Fouquet (who succeeded Joachim as principal cellist of the OSM in 1979), Hélène Gagné, Marcel Saint-Cyr, Julie Trudeau, and Sophie Rolland.

In 1992, he was made a Knight of the National Order of Quebec and a Member of the Order of Canada. He received Quebec's Prix Denise-Pelletier in 1995. Joachim died in Montreal on December 20, 2001.

== Honours ==
- 1992 – Knight of the National Order of Quebec
- 1992 – Member of the Order of Canada
- 1995 – Prix Denise-Pelletier
