= Richard Brousek =

Austrian footballer

Personal information
- Date of birth: 12 January 1931 (age 95)
- Place of birth: Austria
- Position: Forward

Senior career*
Years	Team	Apps	(Gls)
1949–1958	SC Wacker Wien	155	(146)
1958–1960	Sportclub Enschede	62	(21)
1960–1962	Be Quick 1887		(25)
1962–1963	SC Wacker Wien	18	(5)

International career
1955	Austria	4	(1)
- * Club domestic league appearances and goals

Richard Brousek (12 January 1931 – 28 November 2015) was an Austrian football forward who played for Austria. He also played for SC Wacker Wien, Sportclub Enschede and Be Quick 1887.
