= Walter Joachim (Austrian football player) =

Austrian footballer (1901–1976)

Personal information
- Full name: Ernst Walter Joachim
- Date of birth: 3 January 1901
- Place of birth: Vienna, Austria
- Date of death: 1976 (aged 74–75)
- Position: Goalkeeper

Senior career*
| Years | Team | Apps | (Gls) |
- Wiener Amateur-SV

International career
| | Austria | 4 | (0) |

Managerial career
- 1930–1931: Calcio Catania
- * Club domestic league appearances and goals

Ernst Walter Joachim (3 January 1901 – 1976) was an Austrian football player and manager. A goalkeeper, he played for Wiener Amateur-SV and made four appearances for the Austria national team from 1917 to 1919. He coached Italian club Calcio Catania from 1930 to 1931.
