= Theodor Brinek Jr. =

Austrian footballer (1921–2000)

Theodor Brinek
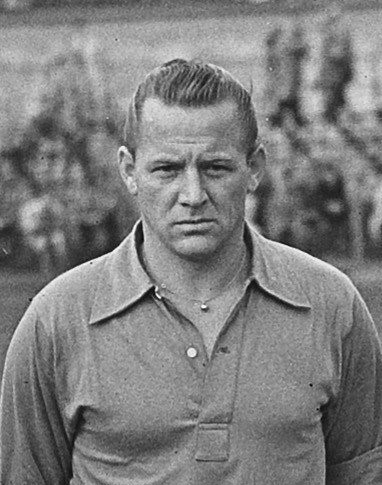
- Brinek in 1953

Personal information
- Date of birth: 9 May 1921
- Place of birth: Austria
- Date of death: 24 January 2000 (aged 78)
- Position: Midfielder

Senior career*
Years	Team	Apps	(Gls)
1939–1953	SC Wacker Wien		
1953–1955	Monaco	51	(11)
1955–1956	Servette		

International career
1946–1953	Austria	17	(2)

Managerial career
- 1955–1956: Servette
- 1957–1958: LASK
- 1962–1963: Iraklis Thessaloniki
- 1968–1969: Kremser SC
- * Club domestic league appearances and goals

Theodor Brinek Jr. (9 May 1921 – 24 January 2000) was an Austrian football player and manager who played as a midfielder. His father, Theodor Brinek Sr., was also an Austria international footballer.

== International career ==
He made his debut for Austria in November 1946 against Switzerland and earned 17 caps, scoring 2 goals. He was also part of Austria's squad for the football tournament at the 1948 Summer Olympics, but he did not play in any matches.
