= Karl Bortoli =

Austrian footballer

Personal information
- Date of birth: 4 October 1912
- Position: Forward

Senior career*
Years	Team	Apps	(Gls)
–1933	Praterstern		
1933–1935	Weiße Elf		
1935–1938	FC Wien		
1938–1939	SK Amateure Steyr		
1939–1947	Vienna		

International career
1945–1947	Austria	7	(0)
- * Club domestic league appearances and goals

Karl Bortoli (born 4 October 1912, date of death unknown) was an Austrian international footballer.
