= Poldl Resch =

Austrian footballer (1900–1971)

Personal information
- Date of birth: 11 October 1900
- Date of death: 18 January 1971 (aged 70)

International career
Years	Team	Apps	(Gls)
1922–1927	Austria	16	(0)

Poldl Resch (11 October 1900 – 18 January 1971) was an Austrian footballer. He played in 16 matches for the Austria national football team from 1922 to 1927.
