= Hans Walzhofer =

Austrian footballer

Personal information
- Date of birth: 23 March 1906
- Place of birth: Austria-Hungary
- Position: Forward

Senior career*
Years	Team	Apps	(Gls)
1922–1926	Jedlersdorfer SC		
1926–1927	Floridsdorfer Athletiksport-Club		
1927–1929	Wiener AC		
1929–1944	Sportclub Wacker		

International career
1927–1934	Austria	5	(0)
- * Club domestic league appearances and goals

Hans Walzhofer (23 March 1906 - 1 March 1970) was an Austrian football forward who played for Austria in the 1934 FIFA World Cup. He also played for Jedlersdorfer SC, Floridsdorfer Athletiksport-Club, Wiener AC, and Sportclub Wacker.
