= Otto Kaller =

Austrian footballer

Personal information
- Date of birth: 28 June 1907
- Date of death: April 1985
- Position: Midfielder

Senior career*
Years	Team	Apps	(Gls)
1925–1948	Vienna		

International career
1926–1945	Austria	8	(0)
- * Club domestic league appearances and goals

Otto Kaller (28 June 1907 – April 1985) was an Austrian international footballer.
