= Kurt Eigenstiller =

Austrian footballer

Personal information
- Date of birth: 11 April 1928
- Date of death: 11 July 2015 (aged 87)
- Position: Forward

International career
Years	Team	Apps	(Gls)
1954	Austria	1	(0)

Kurt Eigenstiller (11 April 1928 – 11 July 2015) was an Austrian footballer. He played in one match for the Austria national football team in 1954.
