= Theodor Brinek (footballer, born 1898) =

Austrian footballer (1898–1974)

Personal information
- Date of birth: 8 August 1898
- Date of death: 25 July 1974 (aged 75)
- Position: Midfielder

International career
Years	Team	Apps	(Gls)
1927	Austria	1	(0)

Theodor Brinek (8 August 1898 – 25 July 1974) was an Austrian footballer who played as a midfielder. He made one appearance for the Austria national team in 1927.
