= 1958 FIFA World Cup Group 4 =

Football tournament group stage

Group 4 of the 1958 FIFA World Cup took place from 8 to 17 June 1958. The group consisted of Austria, Brazil, England, and the Soviet Union.

== Standings ==
Pos	Team	Pld	W	D	L	GF	GA	GR	Pts	Qualification
1	Brazil	3	2	1	0	5	0	—	5	Advance to knockout stage
2	Soviet Union	3	1	1	1	4	4	1.000	3 (Note: The Soviet Union finished ahead of England by winning a play-off.)	Advance to knockout stage
3	England	3	0	3	0	4	4	1.000	3	
4	Austria	3	0	1	2	2	7	0.286	1	

Source: FIFA

== Matches ==
All times listed are local time.

=== Brazil vs Austria ===
8 June 1958
19:00 (CET)

Brazil	3–0	Austria
Altafini 37', 85'; Nílton Santos 50'

Rimnersvallen, Uddevalla
Attendance: 17,788
Referee: Maurice Guigue (France)

Brazil
Austria

GK	3	Gilmar
RB	14	De Sordi
CB	15	Orlando
CB	2	Bellini (c)
LB	12	Nílton Santos
DM	5	Dino Sani
AM	6	Didi
RW	17	Joel
FW	18	Mazzola
FW	21	Dida
LW	7	Zagallo
Manager:
Vicente Feola

GK	1	Rudolf Szanwald
DF	2	Paul Halla
DF	3	Ernst Happel
DF	4	Franz Swoboda
MF	5	Gerhard Hanappi (c)
MF	6	Karl Koller
FW	7	Walter Horak
FW	11	Helmut Senekowitsch
FW	9	Hans Buzek
FW	10	Alfred Körner
FW	13	Walter Schleger
Manager:
Karl Argauer

=== Soviet Union vs England ===
8 June 1958
19:00 (CET)

Soviet Union	2–2	England
Simonyan 13'; A. Ivanov 56'		Kevan 66'; Finney 85' (pen.)

Ullevi, Gothenburg
Attendance: 49,348
Referee: István Zsolt (Hungary)

Soviet Union
England

GK	1	Lev Yashin
RB	2	Vladimir Kesarev
CB	3	Konstantin Krizhevsky
LB	4	Boris Kuznetsov
RH	5	Yuri Voinov
LH	16	Viktor Tsarev
OR	17	Aleksandr Ivanov
IR	8	Valentin Ivanov
CF	9	Nikita Simonyan (c)
IL	10	Sergei Salnikov
OL	11	Anatoli Ilyin
Manager:
Gavriil Kachalin

GK	1	Colin McDonald
RB	2	Don Howe
CB	5	Billy Wright (c)
LB	3	Tommy Banks
RH	4	Eddie Clamp
LH	6	Bill Slater
OR	7	Bryan Douglas
IR	8	Bobby Robson
CF	9	Derek Kevan
IL	10	Johnny Haynes
OL	11	Tom Finney
Manager:
Walter Winterbottom

=== Brazil vs England ===
This was the first goalless draw in World Cup finals history.

11 June 1958
19:00 (CET)

Brazil	0–0	England

Ullevi, Gothenburg
Attendance: 40,895
Referee: Albert Dusch (West Germany)

Brazil
England

GK	3	Gilmar
RB	14	De Sordi
CB	15	Orlando
CB	2	Bellini (c)
LB	12	Nílton Santos
DM	5	Dino Sani
AM	6	Didi
RW	17	Joel
FW	18	Mazzola
FW	20	Vavá
LW	7	Zagallo
Manager:
Vicente Feola

GK	1	Colin McDonald
DF	2	Don Howe
DF	3	Tommy Banks
MF	4	Eddie Clamp
MF	5	Billy Wright (c)
MF	6	Bill Slater
FW	7	Bryan Douglas
FW	8	Bobby Robson
FW	9	Derek Kevan
FW	10	Johnny Haynes
FW	21	Alan A'Court
Manager:
Walter Winterbottom

=== Soviet Union vs Austria ===
11 June 1958
19:00 (CET)

Soviet Union	2–0	Austria
Ilyin 15'; V. Ivanov 62'

Ryavallen, Borås
Attendance: 21,239
Referee: Carl Jørgensen (Denmark)

Soviet Union
Austria

GK	1	Lev Yashin
RB	2	Vladimir Kesarev
CB	3	Konstantin Krizhevsky
LB	4	Boris Kuznetsov
RH	5	Yuri Voinov
LH	16	Viktor Tsarev
OR	17	Aleksandr Ivanov
IR	8	Valentin Ivanov
CF	9	Nikita Simonyan (c)
IL	10	Sergei Salnikov
OL	11	Anatoli Ilyin
Manager:
Gavriil Kachalin

GK	12	Kurt Schmied
RB	17	Ernst Kozlicek
CB	16	Karl Stotz
LB	4	Franz Swoboda
RH	5	Gerhard Hanappi (c)
LH	6	Karl Koller
OR	8	Paul Kozlicek
IR	7	Walter Horak
CF	9	Hans Buzek
IL	11	Helmut Senekowitsch
OL	10	Alfred Körner
Manager:
Karl Argauer

=== England vs Austria ===
15 June 1958
19:00 (CET)

England	2–2	Austria
Haynes 56'; Kevan 74'		Koller 15'; Körner 71'

Ryavallen, Borås
Attendance: 15,872
Referee: Jan Bronkhorst (Netherlands)

England
Austria

GK	1	Colin McDonald
DF	2	Don Howe
DF	3	Tommy Banks
MF	4	Eddie Clamp
MF	5	Billy Wright (c)
MF	6	Bill Slater
FW	7	Bryan Douglas
FW	8	Bobby Robson
FW	9	Derek Kevan
FW	10	Johnny Haynes
FW	21	Alan A'Court
Manager:
Walter Winterbottom

GK	1	Rudolf Szanwald
DF	15	Walter Kollmann
DF	4	Franz Swoboda
DF	3	Ernst Happel
MF	5	Gerhard Hanappi (c)
MF	6	Karl Koller
FW	16	Ernst Kozlicek
FW	8	Paul Kozlicek
FW	9	Hans Buzek
FW	10	Alfred Körner
FW	11	Helmut Senekowitsch
Manager:
Karl Argauer

=== Brazil vs Soviet Union ===
15 June 1958
19:00 (CET)

Brazil	2–0	Soviet Union
Vavá 3', 77'

Ullevi, Gothenburg
Attendance: 50,928
Referee: Maurice Guigue (France)

Brazil
Soviet Union

GK	3	Gilmar
RB	14	De Sordi
CB	15	Orlando
CB	2	Bellini (c)
LB	12	Nílton Santos
DM	19	Zito
AM	6	Didi
RW	11	Garrincha
FW	10	Pelé
FW	20	Vavá
LW	7	Zagallo
Manager:
Vicente Feola

GK	1	Lev Yashin
DF	2	Vladimir Kesarev
DF	4	Boris Kuznetsov
DF	5	Yuri Voinov
DF	3	Konstantin Krizhevsky
MF	16	Viktor Tsarev
MF	6	Igor Netto (c)
FW	17	Aleksandr Ivanov
FW	8	Valentin Ivanov
FW	9	Nikita Simonyan
FW	11	Anatoli Ilyin
Manager:
Gavriil Kachalin

=== Play-off: Soviet Union vs England ===
17 June 1958
19:00 (CET)

Soviet Union	1–0	England
Ilyin 69'

Ullevi, Gothenburg
Attendance: 23,182
Referee: Albert Dusch (West Germany)

Soviet Union
England

GK	1	Lev Yashin
DF	2	Vladimir Kesarev
DF	4	Boris Kuznetsov
DF	5	Yuri Voinov
MF	3	Konstantin Krizhevsky
MF	16	Viktor Tsarev
FW	7	German Apukhtin
FW	8	Valentin Ivanov
FW	9	Nikita Simonyan (c)
FW	20	Yuri Falin
FW	11	Anatoli Ilyin
Manager:
Gavriil Kachalin

GK	1	Colin McDonald
DF	2	Don Howe
DF	3	Tommy Banks
MF	15	Ronnie Clayton
MF	5	Billy Wright (c)
MF	6	Bill Slater
FW	17	Peter Brabrook
FW	18	Peter Broadbent
FW	9	Derek Kevan
FW	10	Johnny Haynes
FW	21	Alan A'Court
Manager:
Walter Winterbottom

== See also ==
- Austria at the FIFA World Cup
- Brazil at the FIFA World Cup
- England at the FIFA World Cup
- Soviet Union at the FIFA World Cup
