= 1972–73 SK Rapid Wien season =

Rapid Wien
1972–73 season
- Coach: Ernst Hlozek
- Stadium: Pfarrwiese, Vienna, Austria
- Nationalliga: 2nd
- Cup: Runners-up
- Cup Winners' Cup: Round of 16
- Top goalscorer: League: Hans Krankl (14); All: Hans Krankl (21)
- Average home league attendance: 8,000

The 1972–73 SK Rapid Wien season was the 75th season in club history.

== Squad ==
=== Squad statistics ===
Nat.	Name	Age	League		Cup		CW Cup		Total		Discipline	
Nat.	Name	Age	Apps	Goals	Apps	Goals	Apps	Goals	Apps	Goals	Booked	Sent off (straight red)
Goalkeepers
(Austria)	Adolf Antrich	31	15		4		2		21			
(Austria)	Erwin Fuchsbichler	20	15		4		2		21			
Defenders
(Austria)	Erich Fak	27	30	2	8		4		42	2		
(Austria)	Roman Groll	22	3+6		1+1		0+1		4+8			
(Austria)	Egon Pajenk	21	27+1		6+1		4		37+2			
(Austria)	Günter Scheffl	28	21+2		6+1		2		29+3			
(Austria)	Ewald Ullmann	29	12		1		4		17			
(West Germany)	Peter Werner	26	27+1		7	1	3		37+1	1		
Midfielders
(West Germany)	Jürgen Ey	25	3+2		1		2+1		6+3			
(Austria)	Geza Gallos	23	28+1	11	8	7	4	2	40+1	20		
(Austria)	Norbert Hof	28	27	3	8	1	4	1	39	5		
(Austria)	Karl Müller	19	2+5				0+4		2+9			
(Austria)	Karl Ritter	25	13+2	5	5+1				18+3	5		
(Austria)	Kurt Scherr	26	0+2						0+2			
(Austria)	Werner Walzer	24	30	2	8		4		42	2		
Forwards
(West Germany)	Herbert Gronen	28	15	1	6	1			21	2		
(Austria)	Stanislaus Kastner	24	10+7	1	0+2		1+1		11+10	1		
(Austria)	Clemens Kos	19	0+1						0+1			
(Austria)	Hans Krankl	19	28+2	14	7+1	6	4	1	39+3	21		
(West Germany)	Bernd Lorenz	24	24	10	8	9	4		36	19		

== Fixtures and results ==
Win Draw Loss

=== League ===
Rd	Date	Venue	Opponent	Res.	Att.	Goals and discipline
1	12.08.1972	A	Austria Klagenfurt	3–2	9,000	Fak 20', Gallos 35' 81'
2	18.08.1972	H	Austria Wien	1–0	25,000	Lorenz 8'
3	23.08.1972	A	VÖEST Linz	1–1	22,000	Gallos 89'
4	16.09.1972	H	Wiener SC	6–0	5,000	Gallos 5' 85', Krankl 16' 54', Lorenz 46', Fak 88'
5	20.09.1972	A	Admira Wr. Neustadt	2–1	5,500	Krankl 22' 55'
6	23.09.1972	H	Leoben	1–0	6,500	Kastner 15'
7	30.09.1972	A	GAK	1–1	10,000	Gallos 46'
8	04.10.1972	H	Vienna	1–1	4,000	Lorenz 75'
9	18.10.1972	A	Wacker Innsbruck	0–1	16,000	
10	21.10.1972	A	Eisenstadt	1–1	10,000	Gallos 69'
11	28.10.1972	H	LASK	1–2	7,500	Lorenz 65' (pen.)
12	04.11.1972	A	Austria Salzburg	0–2	12,000	
13	11.11.1972	H	Admira	1–0	8,000	Gallos 55'
14	19.11.1972	A	Sturm Graz	3–1	7,000	Krankl 1', Walzer 45', Lorenz 46'
15	02.12.1972	H	SW Bregenz	2–0	3,500	Grloci 45' (o.g.), Krankl 78'
16	17.03.1973	H	Austria Klagenfurt	5–2	7,000	Lorenz 16', Krankl 17', Gallos 30' 32' (pen.), Hof 81'
17	24.03.1973	A	Austria Wien	2–2	22,000	Krankl 41', Gallos 65'
18	31.03.1973	H	VÖEST Linz	2–0	8,000	Walzer 27', Krankl 89'
19	07.04.1973	A	Wiener SC	3–2	11,000	Lorenz 29' 72', Ritter 59'
20	25.04.1973	H	Admira Wr. Neustadt	2–1	3,000	Lorenz 68', Gronen 73'
21	02.05.1973	A	Leoben	2–1	6,000	Hof 31', Krankl 76'
22	05.05.1973	H	GAK	0–1	6,000	
23	12.05.1973	A	Vienna	0–0	7,000	
24	15.05.1973	H	Wacker Innsbruck	2–2	23,000	Lorenz 50', Ritter 77'
25	07.07.1973	H	Eisenstadt	1–1	7,500	Krankl 62'
26	06.06.1973	A	LASK	2–3	14,000	Ritter 21', Krankl 44'
27	09.06.1973	H	Austria Salzburg	2–0	3,500	Ritter 15' 34'
28	16.06.1973	A	Admira	2–1	1,000	Krankl 43', Hof 65'
29	23.06.1973	H	Sturm Graz	1–0	3,500	Krankl 35'
30	30.06.1973	A	SW Bregenz	0–2	10,000	

=== Cup ===
Rd	Date	Venue	Opponent	Res.	Att.	Goals and discipline
R1	26.08.1972	A	Radenthein	4–3	2,500	Gallos 39' 62', Lorenz 57' 74'
R16	08.12.1972	A	Austria Salzburg	3–2	6,500	Gallos 39', Hof 43', Lorenz 83'
QF-L1	10.03.1973	H	Vienna	5–2	3,000	Werner P. 1', Lorenz 11' 88', Krankl 69' 81'
QF-L2	13.03.1973	A	Vienna	3–0	3,000	Lorenz 21' 24' (pen.), Gallos 40'
SF-L1	18.04.1973	A	Wiener SC	2–2	6,000	Krankl 12' 55'
SF-L2	09.05.1973	H	Wiener SC	6–3	5,500	Krankl 10' 75', Lorenz 20' 42', Gallos 51' (pen.) 75'
F-L1	27.05.1973	A	Wacker Innsbruck	0–1	17,000	
F-L2	02.06.1973	H	Wacker Innsbruck	2–1	22,000	Gronen 18', Gallos 90' (pen.)

=== Cup Winners' Cup ===
Rd	Date	Venue	Opponent	Res.	Att.	Goals and discipline
R1-L1	13.09.1972	H	PAOK (Greece)	0–0	10,000	
R1-L2	27.09.1972	A	PAOK (Greece)	2–2	45,000	Gallos 23', Krankl 43'
R2-L1	25.10.1972	H	Rapid Bucuresti (Romania)	1–1	7,500	Gallos 10'
R2-L2	08.11.1972	A	Rapid Bucuresti (Romania)	1–3	20,000	Hof 50'
