= 1971–72 SK Rapid Wien season =

Rapid Wien
1971–72 season
- Coaches: Gerd Springer, Robert Körner
- Stadium: Pfarrwiese, Vienna, Austria
- Nationalliga: 5th
- Cup: Winners (8th title)
- UEFA Cup: Round of 16
- Top goalscorer: League: Geza Gallos (8); All: Bernd Lorenz (12)
- Average home league attendance: 9,500

The 1971–72 SK Rapid Wien season was the 74th season in club history.

== Squad ==
=== Squad statistics ===
| Nat. | Name | Age | League | | Cup | | UEFA Cup | | Total | | Discipline | |
| Nat. | Name | Age | Apps | Goals | Apps | Goals | Apps | Goals | Apps | Goals | Booked | Sent off (straight red) |
Goalkeepers
| (Austria) | Adolf Antrich | 30 | 24 | | 5 | | 4 | | 33 | | | |
| (Austria) | Erwin Fuchsbichler | 19 | 4 | | 1+1 | | | | 5+1 | | | |
Defenders
| (Austria) | Erich Fak | 26 | 23 | | 5 | | 4 | | 32 | | 1 | |
| (Austria) | Egon Pajenk | 20 | 22 | | 2 | | 3+1 | | 27+1 | | | |
| (Austria) | Günter Scheffl | 27 | 18+2 | | 4+1 | | 3+1 | | 25+4 | | | |
Midfielders
| (Austria) | Rudolf Flögel | 31 | 24+2 | 7 | 5 | 4 | 4 | | 33+2 | 11 | | |
| (Austria) | Norbert Hof | 27 | 24 | 1 | 6 | | 4 | 1 | 34 | 2 | | |
| (Austria) | Alois Jagodic | 25 | 27 | 1 | 6 | | 4 | 1 | 37 | 2 | | |
| (Austria) | Karl Müller | 18 | 0+9 | 1 | 0+1 | | 0+2 | | 0+12 | 1 | | |
| (Austria) | Ewald Ullmann | 28 | 22 | 1 | 5 | | 1 | | 28 | 1 | | |
| (Austria) | Werner Walzer | 23 | 22+2 | 2 | 5+1 | | 3 | | 30+3 | 2 | | |
Forwards
| (Denmark) | Johnny Bjerregaard | 28 | 15+3 | 3 | 5 | 7 | 4 | | 24+3 | 10 | 1 | |
| (Austria) | Hans Buzek | 33 | 15+4 | 1 | 3 | 4 | 1 | | 19+4 | 5 | | |
| (West Germany) | Jürgen Ey | 24 | 5+9 | 2 | 0+2 | | 1+1 | | 6+12 | 2 | | |
| (Austria) | Geza Gallos | 22 | 28 | 8 | 5 | 2 | 4 | | 37 | 10 | | |
| (Austria) | Stanislaus Kastner | 23 | 5+3 | 3 | 1+2 | | | | 6+5 | 3 | | |
| (Austria) | Clemens Kos | 18 | 3+4 | 1 | 3 | 1 | | | 6+4 | 2 | | |
| (West Germany) | Bernd Lorenz | 23 | 27 | 7 | 5 | 4 | 4 | 1 | 36 | 12 | 1 | |
| (Austria) | Ernst Pils | 18 | 0+3 | | | | | | 0+3 | | | |

== Fixtures and results ==
Win Draw Loss

=== League ===
| Rd | Date | Venue | Opponent | Res. | Att. | Goals and discipline |
|---|---|---|---|---|---|---|
| 1 | 21.08.1971 | H | Wiener SC | 6–1 | 19,000 | Lorenz 15', Jagodic 34', Ey 40' 58', Gallos 85' 87' |
| 2 | 28.08.1971 | A | Vienna | 0–0 | 18,076 | |
| 3 | 08.09.1971 | H | Simmering | 1–0 | 15,000 | Lorenz 46' |
| 4 | 11.09.1971 | A | Admira | 0–0 | 15,000 | |
| 5 | 18.09.1971 | H | Sturm Graz | 1–0 | 12,000 | Flögel 15' |
| 6 | 22.09.1971 | A | LASK | 1–0 | 16,000 | Lorenz 67' |
| 7 | 25.09.1971 | H | Austria Salzburg | 0–0 | 15,000 | |
| 8 | 01.10.1971 | A | Eisenstadt | 3–0 | 12,000 | Flögel 19', Walzer 39', Ullmann 65' |
| 10 | 16.10.1971 | H | Austria Wien | 0–1 | 12,000 | |
| 11 | 23.10.1971 | A | Wacker Innsbruck | 0–0 | 16,000 | |
| 12 | 30.10.1971 | H | GAK | 2–2 | 12,000 | Lorenz 20' (pen.) 71' (pen.) |
| 13 | 06.11.1971 | A | VÖEST Linz | 0–3 | 11,000 | |
| 14 | 13.11.1971 | H | Bischofshofen | 1–0 | 5,000 | Bjerregaard 17' |
| 15 | 27.11.1971 | A | Leoben | 0–0 | 11,000 | |
| 16 | 11.03.1972 | A | Wiener SC | 2–0 | 10,500 | Walzer 64', Gallos 77' |
| 17 | 18.03.1972 | H | Vienna | 1–2 | 9,000 | Bjerregaard 21' |
| 18 | 25.03.1972 | A | Simmering | 4–0 | 6,000 | Lorenz 5', Buzek 25', Flögel 40', Gallos 75' |
| 19 | 01.04.1972 | H | Admira | 1–1 | 5,500 | Flögel 20' |
| 20 | 12.04.1972 | A | Sturm Graz | 1–3 | 8,000 | Flögel 86' |
| 21 | 15.04.1972 | H | LASK | 2–1 | 6,000 | Unknown 40' (pen.), Flögel 72' |
| 22 | 22.04.1972 | A | Austria Salzburg | 1–1 | 14,000 | Gallos 58' |
| 23 | 06.05.1972 | H | Eisenstadt | 2–0 | 8,500 | Bjerregaard 58', Gallos 70' |
| 25 | 13.05.1972 | A | Austria Wien | 1–2 | 17,500 | Gallos 62' |
| 26 | 25.05.1972 | H | Wacker Innsbruck | 1–2 | 8,000 | Kastner 82' |
| 27 | 27.05.1972 | A | GAK | 0–1 | 2,000 | |
| 28 | 31.05.1972 | H | VÖEST Linz | 3–0 | 2,300 | Kos 23', Kastner 36', Flögel 74' |
| 29 | 14.06.1972 | A | Bischofshofen | 3–1 | 1,500 | Lorenz 67', Gallos 81', Müller K. 83' |
| 30 | 17.06.1972 | H | Leoben | 2–2 | 3,000 | Hof 8', Kastner 65' |

=== Cup ===
| Rd | Date | Venue | Opponent | Res. | Att. | Goals and discipline |
|---|---|---|---|---|---|---|
| R1 | 15.08.1971 | A | Hohenau | 3–0 | 4,000 | Buzek 47', Lorenz 80', Bjerregaard 82' |
| R16 | 04.12.1971 | H | Sturm Graz | 6–1 | 3,000 | Flögel 8' 17', Buzek 12' 88', Gallos 48', Bjerregaard 62' |
| QF | 04.03.1972 | H | VÖEST Linz | 3–1 | 6,000 | Gallos 16', Buzek 69', Kos 72' |
| SF | 03.05.1972 | H | Austria Wien | 6–2 | 9,000 | Bjerregaard 21' 31' 48' 80', Flögel 35', Lorenz 90+3' |
| F-L1 | 17.05.1972 | A | Wiener SC | 1–2 | 12,000 | Bjerregaard 21' |
| F-L2 | 03.06.1972 | H | Wiener SC | 3–1 (a.e.t.) | 14,000 | Flögel 56', Lorenz 69' 107' |

=== UEFA Cup ===
| Rd | Date | Venue | Opponent | Res. | Att. | Goals and discipline |
|---|---|---|---|---|---|---|
| R2-L1 | 20.10.1971 | A | Dinamo Zagreb (Socialist Federal Republic of Yugoslavia) | 2–2 | 25,000 | Hof 11', Jagodic 86' |
| R2-L2 | 03.11.1971 | H | Dinamo Zagreb (Socialist Federal Republic of Yugoslavia) | 0–0 | 10,000 | |
| R3-L1 | 24.11.1971 | H | Juventus (Italy) | 0–1 | 623 | |
| R3-L2 | 08.12.1971 | A | Juventus (Italy) | 1–4 | 30,000 | Lorenz 17' |
