= 1974–75 Austrian Cup =

Tournament details
- Country: Austria

Final positions
- Champions: SWW Innsbruck
- Runners-up: Sturm Graz

The 1974–75 Austrian Cup (German: ÖFB-Cup) was the 41st season of Austria's nationwide football cup competition. The final was played over two legs, on 17 June 1975 at the Tivoli, Innsbruck and on 25 June 1975 at the Liebenauer Stadion, Graz.

The competition was won by SWW Innsbruck after beating Sturm Graz 3–2 on aggregate.

== First round ==
Team 1	Score	Team 2
2 August 1974
Salzburger AK 1914	0–1	FC Vorarlberg
3 August 1974
ASK St. Valentin	1–0 (a.e.t.)	SK Bischofshofen
Admira Linz	2–2 (a.e.t.) (4–2 p)	1. Halleiner SK
Blau-Weiß Feldkirch	6–3	SC Kufstein
Deutschlandsberger SC	1–0	Wolfsberger AC
Donawitzer SV Alpine	1–0	Kapfenberger SV
FS Elektra Wien	1–2	1. Wiener Neustädter SC
IG Bregenz/Bludenz	0–2	FC Dornbirn
Kremser SC	2–0	Admira Wr. Neustadt
Rapid Lienz	1–2	Grazer AK
SC Amateure St. Veit	1–3	WSG Radenthein/Villacher SV
SC Pinkafeld	2–1	Badener AC
SV Heid Stockerau	4–0	SV Rechnitz
SV Rottenmann	2–1	SV Flavia Solva
SV/SK Innsbruck	0–1	FC Höchst
USV Rudersdorf	1–2 (a.e.t.)	1. Simmeringer SC
VfB Hohenems	4–2	SC Kundl
4 August 1974
KSV Böhlerwerk	0–2	Wiener Sport-Club
Landstraßer AC Wien	0–3	First Vienna FC
Magdalener SC	3–1	SV St. Veit
SV Grödig	2–0	SV Grieskirchen
WSV Liezen	2–1	1. Schwechater SC

== Second round ==
Team 1	Score	Team 2
27 August 1974
Grazer AK	2–3	SK VÖEST Linz
28 August 1974
Blau-Weiß Feldkirch	0–3	SWW Innsbruck
Kremser SC	0–4	SK Rapid Wien
VfB Hohenems	1–3	SV Austria Salzburg
30 August 1974
FC Vorarlberg	2–1	FC Dornbirn
First Vienna FC	3–0	SC Eisenstadt
31 August 1974
1. Wiener Neustädter SC	2–0	ASK St. Valentin
1. Simmeringer SC	2–0 (a.e.t.)	SV Heid Stockerau
Admira Linz	2–1	Magdalener SC
Deutschlandsberger SC	1–5	Donawitzer SV Alpine
SC Pinkafeld	0–5	FC Admira/Wacker
WSG Radenthein/Villacher SV	0–1 (a.e.t.)	Linzer ASK
WSV Liezen	1–2	SK Austria Klagenfurt
Wiener Sport-Club	2–2 (a.e.t.) (2–1 p)	Austria/WAC
1 September 1974
FC Höchst	2–1	SV Grödig
SV Rottenmann	1–4	SK Sturm Graz

== Third round ==
Team 1	Score	Team 2
12 October 1974
SV Austria Salzburg	1–1 (a.e.t.) (5–6 p)	SK VÖEST Linz
Donawitzer SV Alpine	0–2	First Vienna FC
Linzer ASK	2–1 (a.e.t.)	SK Austria Klagenfurt
SK Rapid Wien	2–1	FC Admira/Wacker
12 October 1974
SK Sturm Graz	3–0	FC Höchst
13 October 1974
1. Simmeringer SC	0–3	SWW Innsbruck
Admira Linz	2–2 (a.e.t.) (5–6 p)	1. Wiener Neustädter SC
FC Vorarlberg	2–1	Wiener Sport-Club

== Quarter-finals ==
Team 1	Score	Team 2
29 March 1975
FC Vorarlberg	1–0 (a.e.t.)	1. Wiener Neustädter SC
15 April 1975
SK Sturm Graz	1–0 (a.e.t.)	Linzer ASK
16 April 1975
SWW Innsbruck	5–1	First Vienna FC
SK VÖEST Linz	2–1	SK Rapid Wien

== Semi-finals ==
The first legs were played on 23 April, while the second legs were played on 30 April 1975.

Team 1	Agg.	Team 2	1st leg	2nd leg
SK Sturm Graz	7–3	FC Vorarlberg	3–1	4–2
SK VÖEST Linz	2–2 (a)	SWW Innsbruck	2–1	0–1

== Final ==
=== First leg ===
17 June 1975
19:30

SWW Innsbruck	3–0	SK Sturm Graz
Horvath 1' (pen.), 40' (pen.); Flindt Bjerg 50'	Report	Bacher 10'

Tivoli, Innsbruck
Attendance: 7,000
Referee: Franz Latzin

=== Second leg ===
25 June 1975
19:30

SK Sturm Graz	2–0	SWW Innsbruck
Kulmer 27', 53'	Report

Liebenauer Stadion, Graz
Attendance: 10,000
Referee: Franz Wöhrer

SSW Innsbruck won 3–2 on aggregate.
