= Helmut Senekowitsch =

Austrian footballer and manager (1933–2007)

Personal information
- Full name: Helmut Senekowitsch
- Date of birth: 22 October 1933
- Place of birth: Graz, Austria
- Date of death: 9 September 2007 (aged 73)
- Place of death: Klosterneuburg, Austria
- Positions: Forward; midfielder

Senior career*
Years	Team	Apps	(Gls)
1955–1958	Sturm Graz	72	(30)
1958–1961	First Vienna	75	(63)
1961–1964	Real Betis	47	(10)
1964–1971	Wacker Innsbruck	160	(16)
Total		354	(119)

International career
1957–1968	Austria	18	(5)

Managerial career
- 1971–1973: Grazer AK
- 1973–1975: SK VÖEST Linz
- 1975–1976: FC Admira/Wacker
- 1976–1978: Austria
- 1978–1979: Tecos UAG
- 1979–1980: Athletic Bilbao
- 1980–1981: Panathinaikos
- 1981: Olympiacos
- 1982: Eintracht Frankfurt
- 1983: AEK Athens
- 1983–1984: AEK Athens
- 1984–1985: Grazer AK
- 1985–1988: Tecos UAG
- 1988: Cádiz CF
- 1989–1990: Panionios
- 1990–1991: AC Omonia
- 1991–1992: LASK Linz
- 1995–1996: Floridsdorfer AC
- 1997: First Vienna
- * Club domestic league appearances and goals

Helmut Senekowitsch ([seˈnekovitʃ]; 22 October 1933 – 9 September 2007) was an Austrian football player and later a football manager.

== Club career ==
Senekowitsch played for several clubs, including SK Sturm Graz, Real Betis and FC Wacker Innsbruck.

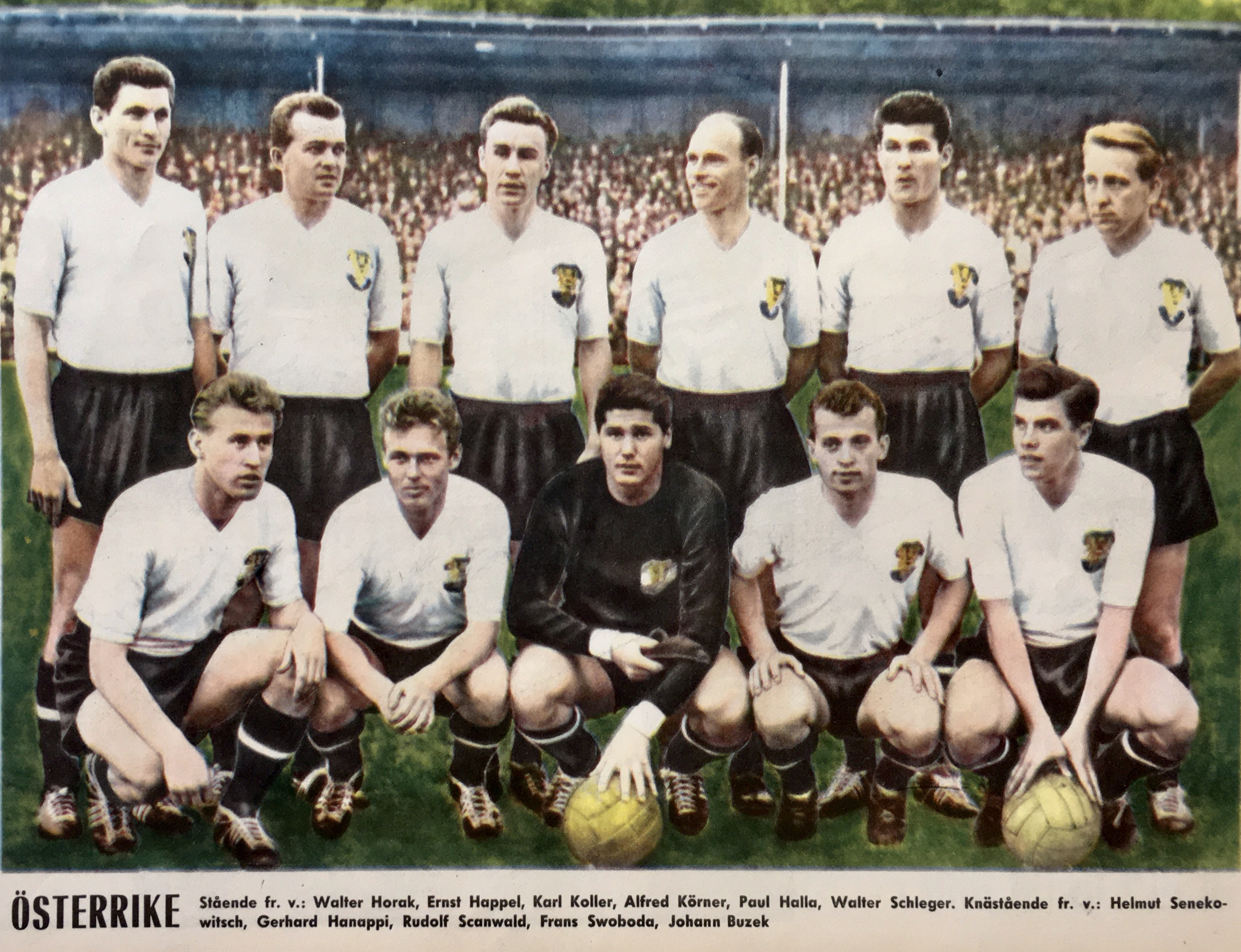
Austria in 1958 – from left to right, standing; Horak, Happel, Koller, Körner, Halla, Schleger; crouched: Senekowitsch, Hanappi, Szanwald, Swoboda and Buzek.

== International career ==
Senekowitsch played for the Austria national football team and was a participant at the 1958 FIFA World Cup. He earned 18 caps, scoring 5 goals.

== Managerial career ==
Senekowitsch later worked as a coach, one of his major achievements was helping Austria qualify for the 1978 FIFA World Cup, the first time Austria had qualified for the World Cup in twenty years. The Austrian team advanced to the second round in whose first match they fell 1–5 against Netherlands being coached by former international teammate Ernst Happel. Later he led them during the game dubbed The miracle of Córdoba, against arch-rivals West Germany, which the Austrians won 3–2. It was Austria's first victory against a German national side in 47 years, and its first victory over West Germany.

== Death ==
He died in September 2007 after a long illness.

== Honours ==
=== Player ===
Wacker Innsbruck

- Austrian football championship: 1970–71
- Austrian Cup: 1969–70

=== Manager ===
AEK Athens

- Greek Cup: 1982–83
