= 1972–73 Austrian Cup =

Tournament details
- Country: Austria

Final positions
- Champions: SSW Innsbruck
- Runners-up: Rapid Wien

The 1972–73 Austrian Cup (German: ÖFB-Cup) was the 39th season of Austria's nationwide football cup competition. The final was played over two legs, on 27 May 1973 at the Praterstadion, Vienna and on 2 June 1973 at the Tivoli, Innsbruck.

The competition was won by SSW Innsbruck after beating Rapid Wien on away goals rule after the tie finished 2–2 on aggregate.

== First round ==
Team 1	Score	Team 2
5 August 1972
ESV Austria Innsbruck	4–1	SV Hall
Badener AC	2–2 (a.e.t.) (4–2 p)	Wiener AC
Deutschlandsberger SC	1–0	Salzburger AK 1914
Magdalener SC	0–1 (a.e.t.)	SV Grieskirchen
Ostbahn XI Wien	1–5	1. Simmeringer SC
SC Ortmann	2–3	1. Schwechater SC
SV Mattersburg	1–1 (a.e.t.) (5–4 p)	SV Heid Stockerau
USV Rudersdorf	2–3 (a.e.t.)	WSG Radenthein
WSK Kaprun	4–2 (a.e.t.)	1. Halleiner SK
WSV Rosental	0–3	Kapfenberger SV
Welser SC	3–2	Villacher SV
6 August 1972
FC Dornbirn	2–1	Blau-Weiß Feldkirch
Innsbrucker AC	1–0	SK Bischofshofen
Landstraßer AC Wien	3–1	SV Wienerberger
Rätia Bludenz	3–1	FC Höchst
SK Altheim	0–2	Wolfsberger AC

== Second round ==
Team 1	Score	Team 2
26 August 1972
1. Simmeringer SC	1–1 (a.e.t.) (3–4 p)	FC Admira/Wacker
ESV Austria Innsbruck	1–2	First Vienna FC
Badener AC	0–6	SK Austria Klagenfurt
Deutschlandsberger SC	3–5	Linzer ASK
FC Dornbirn	0–0 (a.e.t.) (3–2 p)	SK Sturm Graz
Kapfenberger SV	0–1	Admira Wr. Neustadt
SV Grieskirchen	0–1	Wiener Sport-Club
SV Mattersburg	0–2	Donawitzer SV Alpine
WSG Radenthein	3–4	SK Rapid Wien
WSK Kaprun	1–8	FK Austria Wien
Welser SC	2–2 (a.e.t.) (4–2 p)	Schwarz-Weiß Bregenz
Wolfsberger AC	0–6	SWW Innsbruck
27 August 1972
1. Schwechater SC	2–3	Grazer AK
Innsbrucker AC	0–1	SC Eisenstadt
Landstraßer AC Wien	0–2	SK VÖEST Linz
Rätia Bludenz	2–3	SV Austria Salzburg

== Third round ==
Team 1	Score	Team 2
1 November 1972
Admira Wr. Neustadt	0–0 (a.e.t.) (3–5 p)	SWW Innsbruck
First Vienna FC	3–2	FC Dornbirn
22 November 1972
SC Eisenstadt	3–1	SK Austria Klagenfurt
8 December 1972
SV Austria Salzburg	2–3	SK Rapid Wien
Donawitzer SV Alpine	0–1	FK Austria Wien
Linzer ASK	5–2	Welser SC
SK VÖEST Linz	1–0	Grazer AK
10 December 1972
Wiener Sport-Club	2–1	FC Admira/Wacker

== Quarter-finals ==
The first legs were played on 3, 7 and 10 March, while the second legs were played on 10, 11, 13 March and 3 April 1973.

Team 1	Agg.	Team 2	1st leg	2nd leg
Linzer ASK	2–3	SK VÖEST Linz	2–1	0–2
SC Eisenstadt	4–5	SWW Innsbruck	2–2	2–5
Wiener Sport-Club	3–2	FK Austria Wien	1–1	2–1
SK Rapid Wien	8–2	First Vienna FC	5–2	3–0

== Semi-finals ==
The first legs were played on 18 April, while the second legs were played on 9 May 1973.

Team 1	Agg.	Team 2	1st leg	2nd leg
SK VÖEST Linz	1–4	SWW Innsbruck	1–1	0–3
Wiener Sport-Club	5–8	SK Rapid Wien	2–2	3–6

== Final ==
=== First leg ===
27 May 1973
16:00

SWW Innsbruck	1–0	SK Rapid Wien
Jara 55'	Report

Tivoli, Innsbruck
Attendance: 17,000
Referee: Josef Bucek

=== Second leg ===
2 June 1973
16:30

SK Rapid Wien	2–1	SWW Innsbruck
Gronen 18'; Gallos 90' (pen.)	Report	Flindt Bjerg 9'

Praterstadion, Vienna
Attendance: 22,000
Referee: Erich Linemayr

2–2 on aggregate. SWW Innsbruck won on away goals.
