= Werner Schwarz (footballer) =

Austrian footballer

Personal information
- Date of birth: 12 April 1952 (age 74)
- Place of birth: Innsbruck, Austria
- Height: 1.81 m (5 ft 11 in)
- Position: Midfielder

Senior career*
Years	Team	Apps	(Gls)
1972–1974	Austria WAC Wien	25	(2)
1974–1984	SSW Innsbruck	175	(14)
Total		200	(16)

International career
1976	Austria	3	(0)
- * Club domestic league appearances and goals

Werner Schwarz (born 12 April 1952) is an Austrian former footballer who played as a midfielder for Austria WAC Wien and SSW Innsbruck. He made three appearances for the Austria national team in 1976.
