= Cor Brom =

Dutch footballer and manager

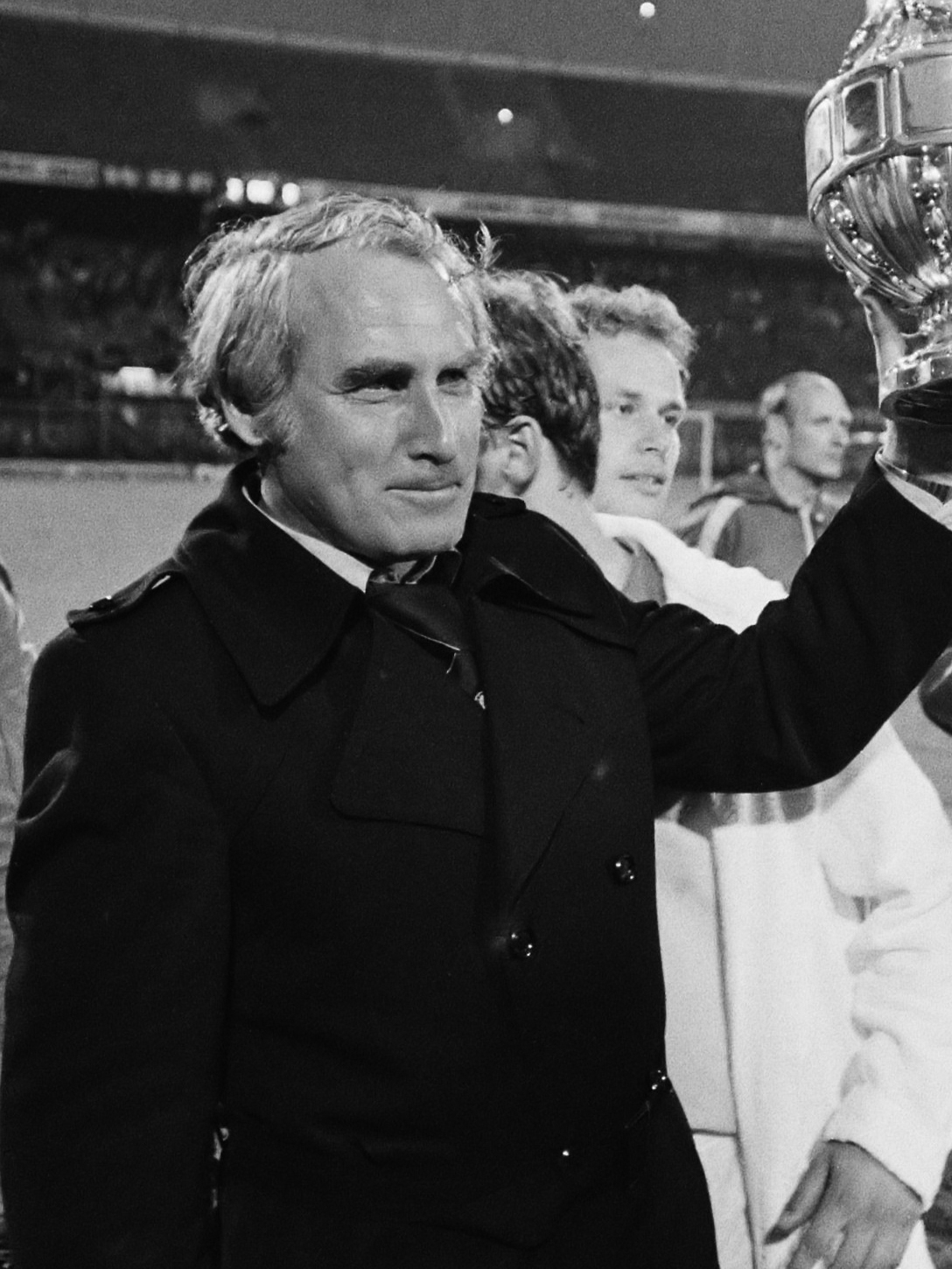
- Brom in 1979

Personal information
- Full name: Cornelis Brom
- Date of birth: 27 August 1932
- Place of birth: Amsterdam, Netherlands
- Date of death: 29 October 2008 (aged 76)
- Place of death: Amsterdam, Netherlands
- Position: Midfielder

Senior career*
Years	Team	Apps	(Gls)
1953–1954	VVA Amsterdam		
1954–1956	BVC Amsterdam		
1956–1957	BSV Limburgia		
1957–1959	IJVV Stormvogels		
1959–1963	VSV Velsen		
1963–1966	Telstar		

Managerial career
- 1969–1972: Vitesse
- 1972–1976: Fortuna SC
- 1976–1978: Sparta
- 1978–1979: Ajax
- 1979–1981: Thor Waterschei
- 1981–1982: RWD Molenbeek
- 1982–1984: FC Zwolle
- 1984–1985: SSW Innsbruck
- 1985: MVV
- * Club domestic league appearances and goals

Cor Brom (27 August 1932 – 29 October 2008) was a Dutch football player and manager.

== Playing career ==
During his playing career, Brom played as a midfielder for VVA Amsterdam, BVC Amsterdam, BSV Limburgia, IJVV Stormvogels, VSV Velsen and Telstar.

== Managerial career ==
After retiring as a player, Brom managed Vitesse Arnhem from 1969 to 1972, Fortuna SC from 1972 to 1976, Sparta Rotterdam from 1976 to 1978, Ajax from 1978 to 1979, RWD Molenbeek from 1981 to 1982, and FC Zwolle from 1982 to 1984.

He was dismissed by Ajax's new chairman Ton Harmsen in 1979 after allegedly taking payments and gifts (a horse and the meat of a whole pig), meant for the players, from an amateur side who played Ajax in pre-season.

== Later life and death ==
Brom died in Amsterdam on 29 October 2008, of Parkinson's disease.
