= Branko Elsner =

Slovenian footballer (1929–2012)

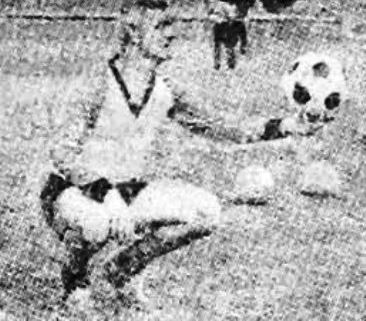

Personal information
- Date of birth: 23 November 1929
- Place of birth: Ljubljana, Kingdom of Yugoslavia
- Date of death: 17 November 2012 (aged 82)
- Place of death: Ljubljana, Slovenia

Youth career
- Vič
- Enotnost / Odred

Senior career*
Years	Team	Apps	(Gls)
- Enotnost / Odred
- Branik Maribor
- Slovan

Managerial career
- 1964–1967: Olimpija
- 1968–1970: Wacker Innsbruck
- 1972: Wacker Innsbruck
- 1974–1976: Wacker Innsbruck
- 1975: Austria
- 1977–1978: Olimpija
- 1985–1987: Austria
- 1997: Brummell Sendai
- * Club domestic league appearances and goals

Branko Elsner (23 November 1929 – 17 November 2012) was a Slovenian football manager and player, most known for being the manager of the Austria national team twice.

Elsner had his first success as a football coach in his Slovenian homeland with Olimpija, whom he trained from 1964 to 1967.

== Personal life ==
His son Marko Elsner, and grandsons Luka Elsner and Rok Elsner, were all professional footballers.
