= 1971–72 Austrian Cup =

Tournament details
- Country: Austria

Final positions
- Champions: Rapid Wien
- Runner-up: Wiener Sport-Club

The 1971–72 Austrian Cup (German: ÖFB-Cup) was the 38th season of Austria's nationwide football cup competition. The final was played over two legs, on 27 May 1972 at the Praterstadion, Vienna and on 2 June 1972 at the Tivoli, Innsbruck.

The competition was won by Rapid Wien after beating Wiener Sport-Club 5–4 on aggregate.

== First round ==
Team 1	Score	Team 2
7 August 1971
Admira Wr. Neustadt	2–0	1. Halleiner SK
SC Austria Lustenau	1–2 (a.e.t.)	Villacher SV
SC Oberwart	2–4 (a.e.t.)	FC Wien
VfB Hohenems	0–2 (a.e.t.)	SC Kundl
WSG Ferndorf	1–0	WSG Radenthein
8 August 1971
ASK St. Valentin	1–3	SVS Linz
ASV Hohenau	3–0	Salzburger AK 1914
ASV Siegendorf	2–0	SC Tulln
FC Höchst	0–0 (a.e.t.) (4–3 p)	Blau-Weiß Feldkirch
Phönix Mürzzuschlag/Hönigsberg	0–4	Kapfenberger SV
Post SV Wien	0–4 (a.e.t.)	Wacker/Admira
Prater SV	1–1 (a.e.t.) (3–5 p)	Wiener AC
SK Altheim	4–1	Innsbrucker AC
SV Flavia Solva	0–2	SV Wienerberger
8 August 1971
Schwarz-Weiß Bregenz	4–0	ESV Austria Innsbruck
14 August 1971
SK Austria Klagenfurt	1–1 (a.e.t.) (2–4 p)	Rapid Lienz

== Second round ==
Team 1	Score	Team 2
14 August 1971
ASV Siegendorf	0–3	SK Sturm Graz
Admira Wr. Neustadt	2–4	FK Austria Wien
Kapfenberger SV	2–3	1. Simmeringer SC
SC Kundl	0–3	SC Eisenstadt
SV Wienerberger	4–4 (a.e.t.) (4–3 p)	Linzer ASK
SVS Linz	1–1 (a.e.t.) (3–4 p)	First Vienna FC
Villacher SV	2–3	SV Austria Salzburg
15 August 1971
ASV Hohenau	0–3	SK Rapid Wien
FC Höchst	3–5	Wiener Sport-Club
FC Wien	0–7	SK VÖEST Linz
SK Altheim	1–2	SWW Innsbruck
Schwarz-Weiß Bregenz	4–0	SK Bischofshofen
WSG Ferndorf	1–3	Donawitzer SV Alpine
Wacker/Admira	2–1	FC Admira/Wacker
26 October 1971
Rapid Lienz	2–0	Grazer AK

== Third round ==
Team 1	Score	Team 2
26 October 1971
Schwarz-Weiß Bregenz	1–3	FK Austria Wien
4 December 1971
1. Simmeringer SC	0–1	SC Eisenstadt
SK Rapid Wien	6–1	SK Sturm Graz
SK VÖEST Linz	1–1 (a.e.t.) (5–4 p)	SWW Innsbruck
Wiener Sport-Club	3–0	Rapid Lienz
5 December 1971
SV Austria Salzburg	3–1 (a.e.t.)	Donawitzer SV Alpine
SV Wienerberger	1–0	Wacker/Admira
26 February 1972
First Vienna FC	2–1	Wiener AC

== Quarter-finals ==
Team 1	Score	Team 2
4 March 1972
FK Austria Wien	2–1	First Vienna FC
SK Rapid Wien	3–1	SK VÖEST Linz
5 March 1972
SV Wienerberger	0–3 (w/o)	SV Austria Salzburg
Wiener Sport-Club	2–0	SC Eisenstadt

== Semi-finals ==
Team 1	Score	Team 2
2 May 1972
Wiener Sport-Club	3–1 (a.e.t.)	SV Austria Salzburg
3 May 1972
SK Rapid Wien	6–2	FK Austria Wien

== Final ==
=== First leg ===
17 May 1972
17:00

Wiener Sport-Club	2–1	SK Rapid Wien
Rinker 48' (pen.); Wustinger 53'	Report	Bjerregaard 21'

Sport-Club Platz, Vienna
Attendance: 12,000
Referee: Paul Schiller

=== Second leg ===
3 June 1972
16:30

SK Rapid Wien	3–1 (a.e.t.)	Wiener Sport-Club
Flögel 55'; Lorenz 67', 106'	Report	Hörmayer 16'

Pfarrwiese, Vienna
Attendance: 14,000
Referee: Adolf Mathias

SK Rapid Wien won 5–4 on aggregate.
