= Karl Koller (footballer) =

Austrian footballer

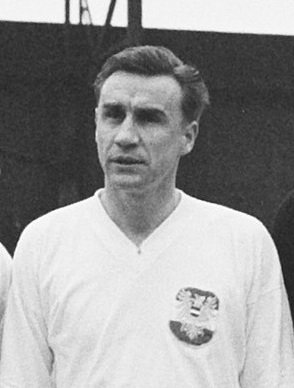
- Koller in 1964

Personal information
- Full name: Karl Koller
- Date of birth: 9 February 1929
- Place of birth: Hölles, Austria
- Date of death: 24 January 2009 (aged 79)
- Place of death: Baden, Austria
- Position: Midfielder

Senior career*
Years	Team	Apps	(Gls)
1949–1966	First Vienna	836	(101)

International career
1952–1965	Austria	86	(5)

Managerial career
- 1967: 1. Wiener Neustädter SC
- 1968: First Vienna
Medal record
Representing Austria
FIFA World Cup
Third place	1954 Switzerland
- * Club domestic league appearances and goals

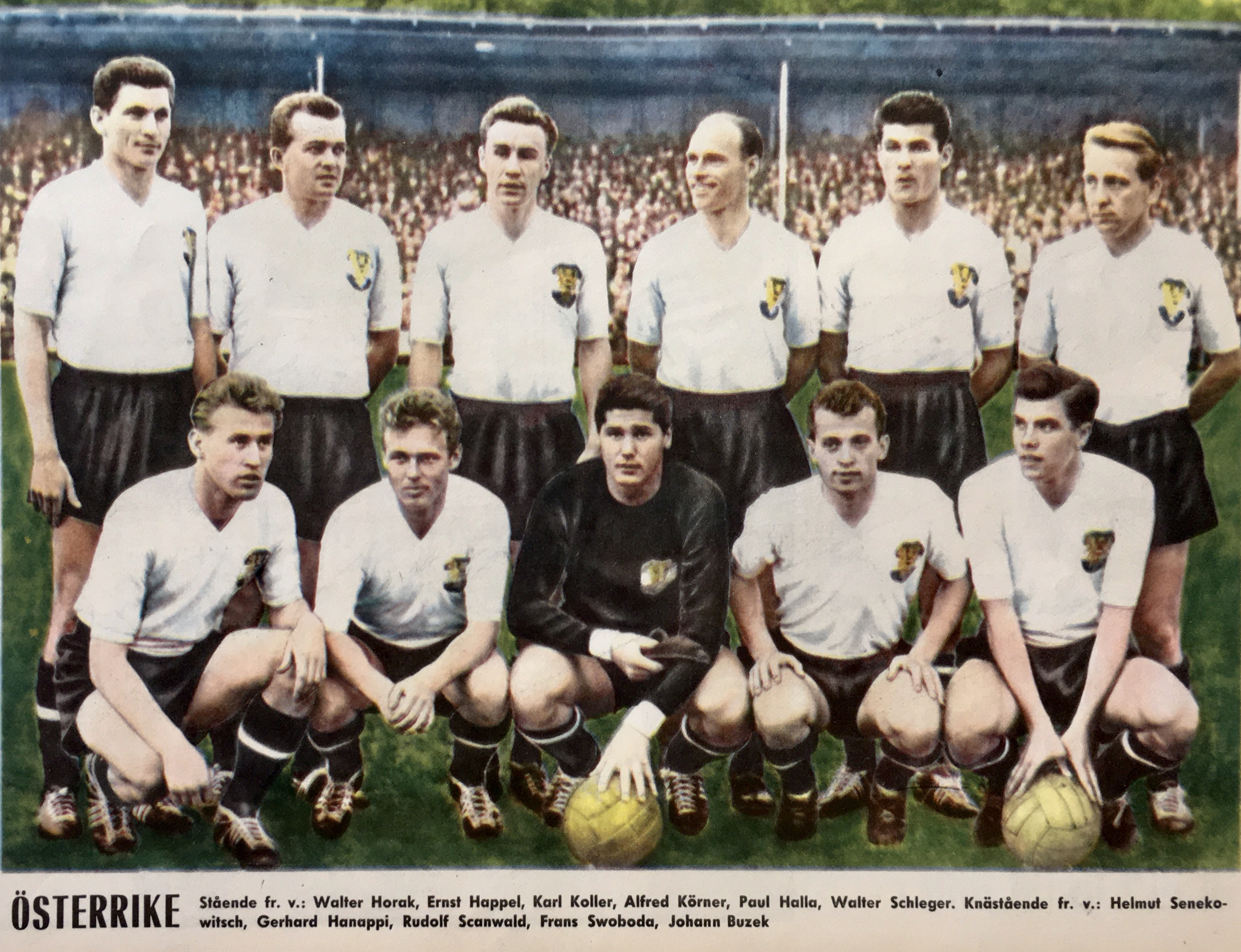
Austria national football team in 1958 with the following players – from left to right, standing; Walter Horak, Ernst Happel, Karl Koller, Alfred Körner, Paul Halla, Walter Schleger; crouched: Helmut Senekowitsch, Gerhard Hanappi, Rudolf Szanwald, Franz Swoboda and Johann Buzek.

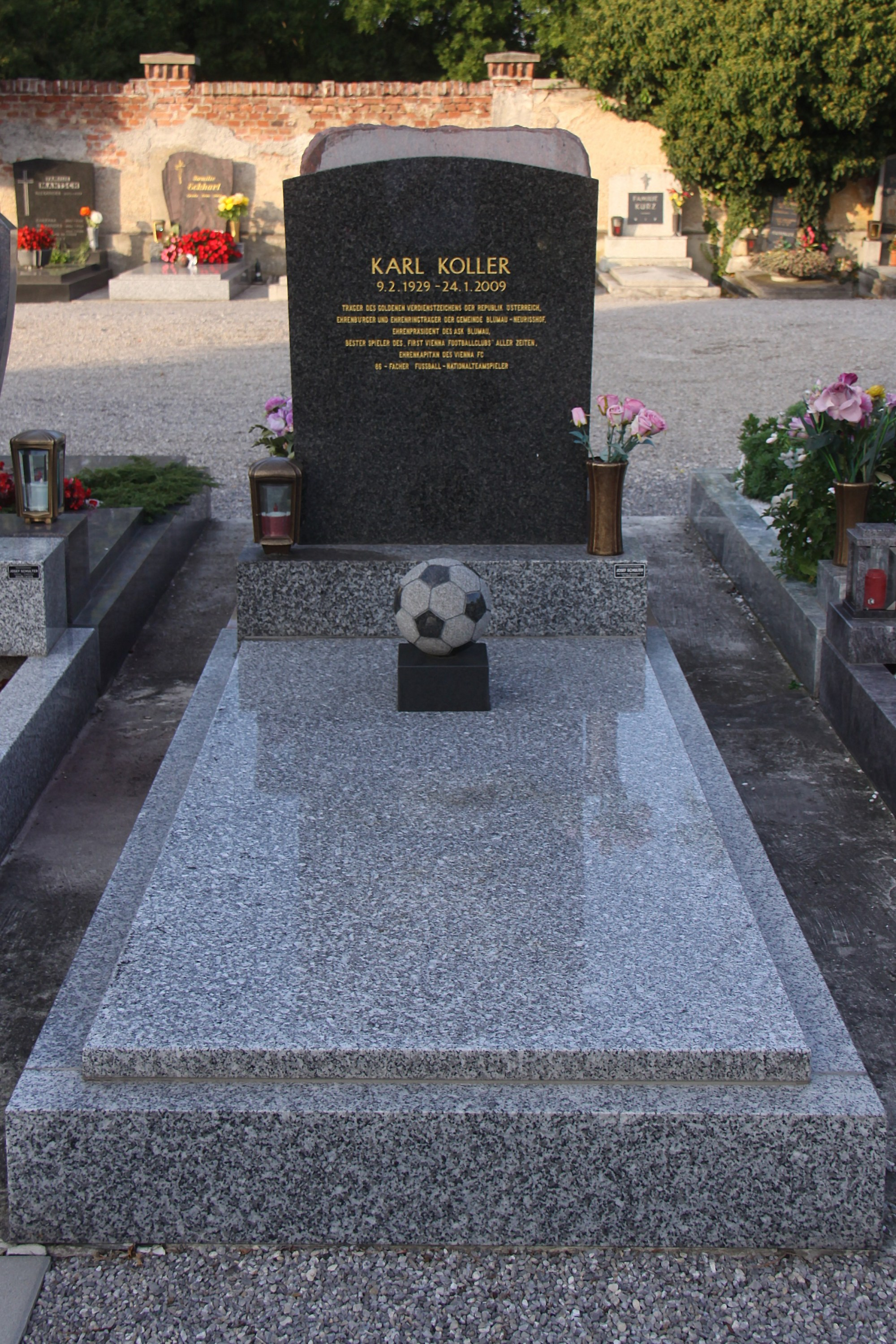
Grave of Karl Koller in Blumau-Neurißhof

Karl Koller (9 February 1929 – 24 January 2009) was an Austrian football player.

== Club career ==
Koller played most of his career for First Vienna FC (1949–1966). He is regarded, behind Ernst Ocwirk and Gerhard Hanappi, as one of the best Austrian midfielders of all time and was rated as one of the best 100 European footballers of the 20th century by the IFFHS. Normally a center midfielder, Koller was capable in both in defense and attack and was well known for technique, strength and powerful shot from distance.

== International career ==
He made his debut for Austria in a March 1952 friendly match against Belgium and was a participant at the 1954 FIFA World Cup in Switzerland, where they reached 3rd place and 1958 FIFA World Cup, where he scored a goal in a match against England.

He earned 86 caps, scoring 5 goals, which still makes him Austria's fourth most capped player of all time. His last international was a September 1965 World Cup qualification match against Hungary.

He went on to coach 1. Wiener Neustädter SC.

== Honours ==
=== Club ===
- Austrian Football Bundesliga (1):
  - 1955
- Austrian Cup (1):
  - 1961

=== International ===
- FIFA World Cup Third Place:
  - 1954
