= Ernst Happel =

Austrian footballer and manager (1925–1992)

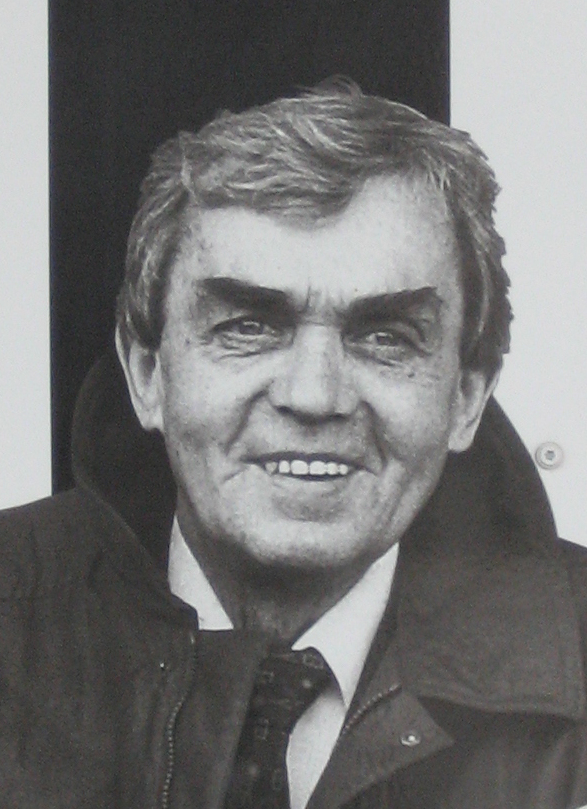
- Happel in a commemorative banner

Personal information
- Full name: Ernst Franz Hermann Happel
- Date of birth: 29 November 1925
- Place of birth: Vienna, Austria
- Date of death: 14 November 1992 (aged 66)
- Place of death: Innsbruck, Austria
- Height: 1.78 m (5 ft 10 in)
- Position: Defender

Youth career
- 1938–1942: Rapid Wien

Senior career*
Years	Team	Apps	(Gls)
1942–1954	Rapid Wien	177	(8)
1955–1956	RC Paris	42	(9)
1956–1959	Rapid Wien	63	(17)
Total		282	(34)

International career
1947–1958	Austria	51	(5)

Managerial career
- 1962–1969: ADO Den Haag
- 1967: San Francisco Gales
- 1969–1973: Feyenoord
- 1973: Sevilla
- 1974–1978: Club Brugge
- 1977–1978: Netherlands
- 1979: Harelbeke
- 1979–1981: Standard Liège
- 1981–1987: Hamburger SV
- 1987–1991: Swarovski Tirol
- 1992: Austria
Medal record
Men's football
Representing Austria (as player)
FIFA World Cup
Bronze medal – third place	1954
Representing Netherlands (as manager)
FIFA World Cup
Runner-up	1978
- * Club domestic league appearances and goals

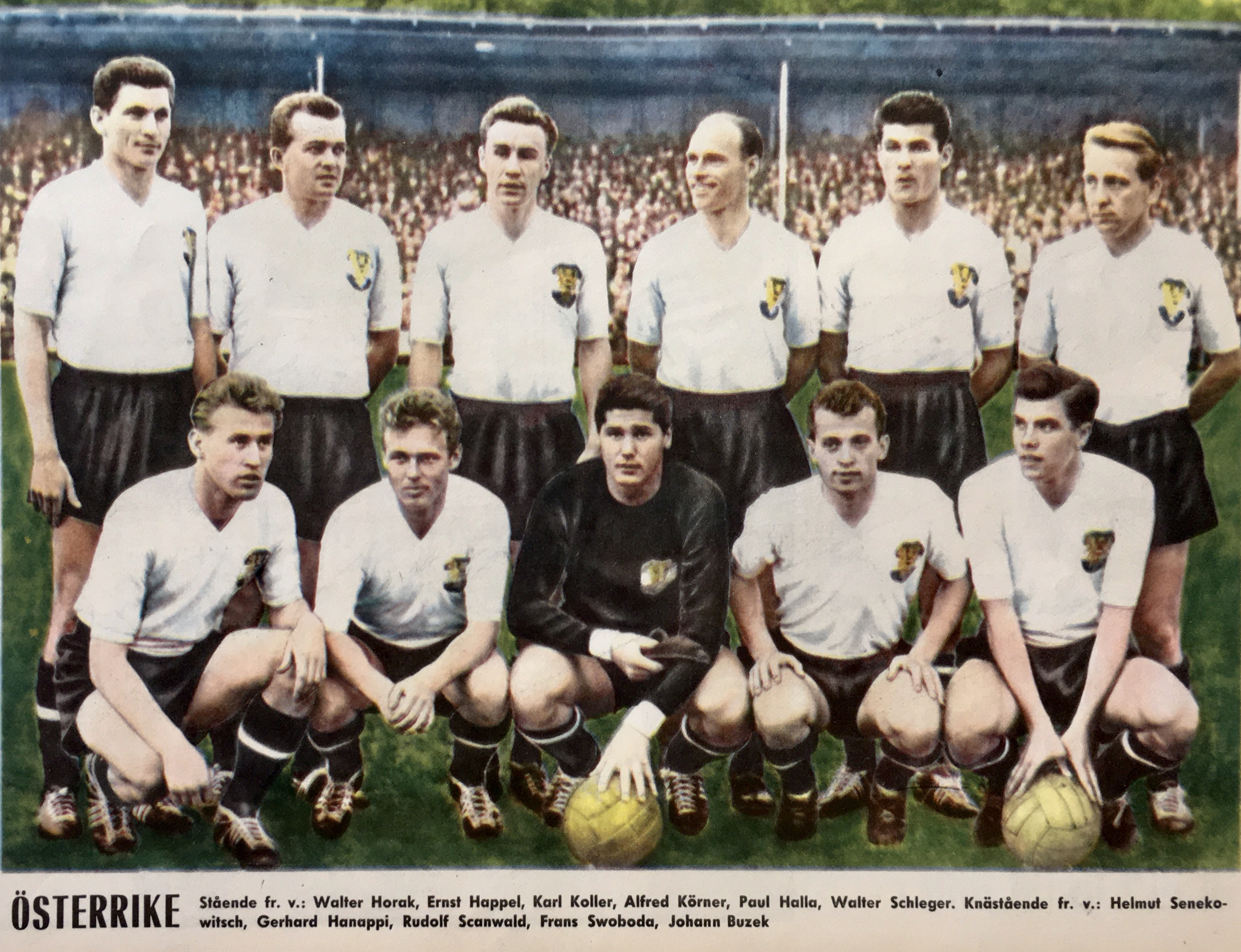
Team Austria of 1958 with the following players – from left to right, standing; Walter Horak, Ernst Happel, Karl Koller, Alfred Körner, Paul Halla, Walter Schleger; crouched: Helmut Senekowitsch, Gerhard Hanappi, Rudolf Szanwald, Franz Swoboda and Johann Buzek.

Ernst Franz Hermann Happel (29 November 1925 – 14 November 1992) was an Austrian football player and manager. Regarded as one of the greatest managers of all time, he won both league and domestic cup titles in the Netherlands, Belgium, West Germany, and Austria. Happel won the European Cup twice, in 1970 with Feyenoord and 1983 with Hamburger SV, and managed Club Brugge to a European Cup runner-up finish in 1978. He also won a runners-up medal with the Netherlands at the 1978 FIFA World Cup; this remains the best result ever for a non-domestic manager in a World Cup alongside Englishman George Raynor's Swedish runner-up campaign in 1958.

Happel was the first of the seven managers to have won the European Cup with two clubs (Carlo Ancelotti, Ottmar Hitzfeld, José Mourinho, Luis Enrique, Pep Guardiola, and Jupp Heynckes being the other six). He is also one of six managers—along with Ancelotti, Mourinho, Giovanni Trapattoni, Tomislav Ivić, and Eric Gerets—to have won top-flight domestic league championships in at least four countries.

== Playing career ==
=== Club level ===
Happel started his professional playing career at Rapid Wien, where he made his first team debut at age 17. Forming a solid defensive partnership with Max Merkel, he played 14 years for Rapid, from 1943 until 1954 and 1956 until 1959, winning the Austrian Championship title six times. He was chosen in Rapid's Team of the Century in 1999.

Between his two stints at Rapid Wien, Happel spent the 1954-55 and 1955–56 seasons playing for Racing Club de Paris in France.

=== International level ===
Happel made his debut for Austria in September 1947 against Hungary. He played for Austria at the 1948 Summer Olympics. He was a participant at the 1954 FIFA World Cup in Switzerland, where he helped Austria reach third place, and also at the 1958 FIFA World Cup in Sweden. His last international was a September 1958 match against Yugoslavia. He earned 51 caps and scored 5 goals.

== Managerial career ==
After retiring as a player, Happel went on to become one of the greatest coaches of all time. He won the league title in four countries. He also took two clubs to gold in the European Champions' Cup (now the UEFA Champions League) and the Netherlands to second place in the 1978 World Cup. His first club was ADO Den Haag in 1962, with whom he won the Dutch Cup in 1968. After Den Haag he coached Feyenoord, with whom he won the European Cup (defeated Glasgow Celtic in the 1970 final) and the Intercontinental Cup in 1970, and the Dutch championship in 1971.

At the 1978 World Cup in Argentina, Happel was coach of The Netherlands national team and reached the final against the Argentina national team. Always a man of few words, Happel's pre-match pep talk is said to have consisted of just one sentence: "Gentlemen, two points." The Dutch, however, lost the final 3–1 in extra time.

During his career as coach, Happel worked for several clubs, including Sevilla, Club Brugge (winning the Belgian Championship title several times) and Hamburger SV (1981–1987, German champions in 1982 and 1983, German Cup winner 1987).

In 1983, he won the European Cup again, 13 years after the triumph with Feyenoord, this time with Hamburger SV, defeating Juventus in the final. He is one of seven coaches in the history of the European Cup (now called Champions League) to win the title with two clubs, the others being Ottmar Hitzfeld, who won with Borussia Dortmund and Bayern Munich; José Mourinho, who won with Porto and Inter Milan; Jupp Heynckes, who won with Real Madrid and Bayern Munich; Carlo Ancelotti, who won with Milan and Real Madrid; Pep Guardiola, who won with FC Barcelona and Manchester City; and Luis Enrique, who won with FC Barcelona and Paris Saint-Germain.

In 1987, Happel returned to Austria as coach of Swarovski Tirol. With the club, he won the Austrian Championship title twice (1989 and 1990) before becoming coach of the Austria national team in 1992.

== Personal life ==
All youth players of Rapid Vienna automatically became member of the Hitler Jugend in 1938. Ernst reported he refused to sing along to their songs until he was kicked out of their gatherings.

He was conscripted and dispatched to the Eastern Front in 1943. Although he never saw action, he was arrested by the Americans in 1945. He escaped by jumping out of the train wagon in Munich and took several months to make his way back to Vienna. He smuggled himself into the Soviet occupation zone with the excuse that he had seen from afar his house was still standing and that he'd started playing at Rapid Vienna again.

Ernst Happel never married. He was described by one of his ex-players Birger Jensen as a bit of a loner, always accompanied by his cigarettes and cognac. He nevertheless would meet up with Austrian friends, enjoying card games, pool and darts.

Correction: Ernst Happel married in 1952 to Elfride Kogler( 1924- 1996) . They had a son, Ernst Happel Junior.

Source: https://portal.dnb.de/opac.htm?method=simpleSearch&query=119100169

== Death ==
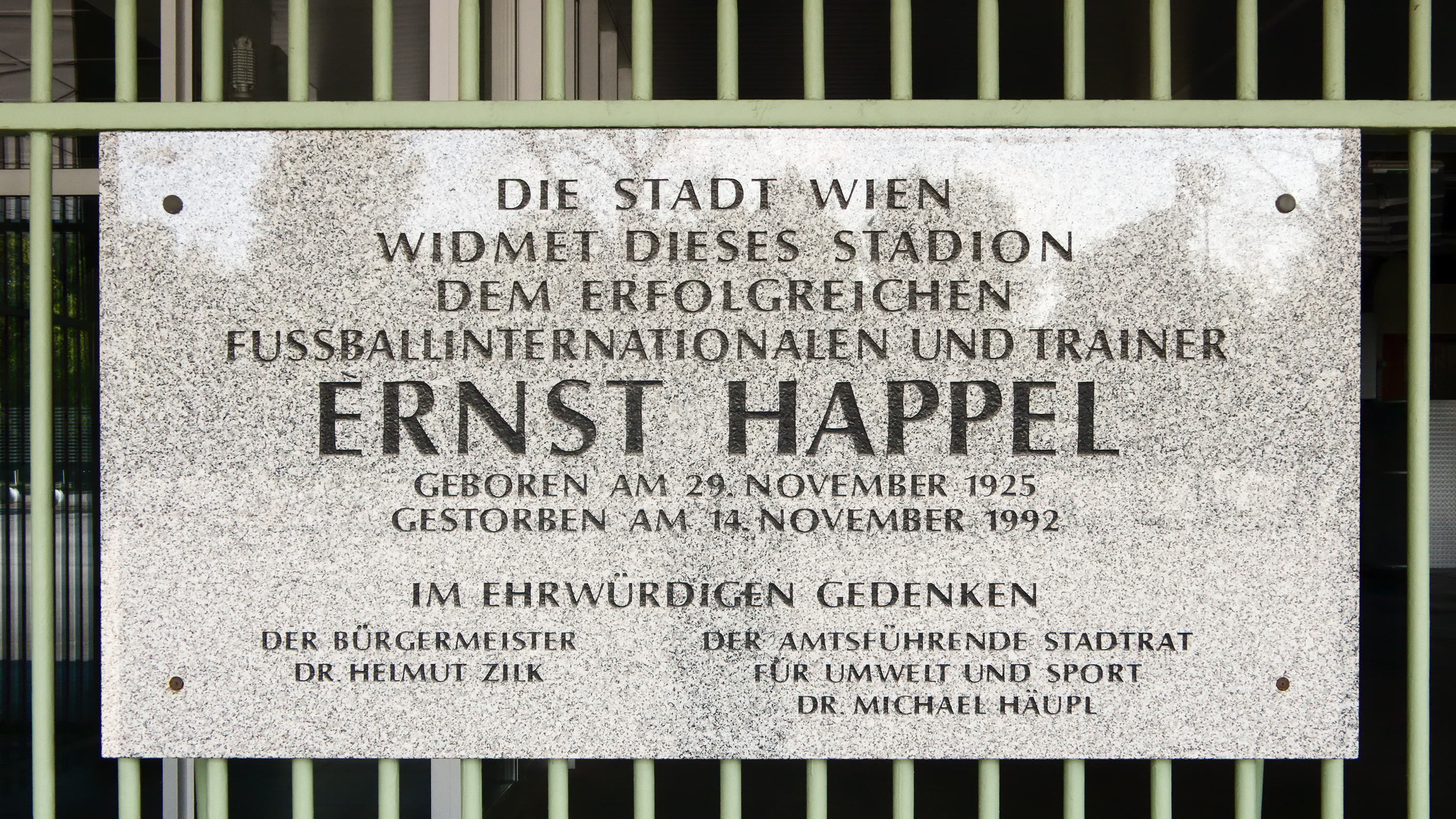
Plaque at the Ernst-Happel-Stadion in Vienna

A heavy smoker for most of his adult life, Happel died of lung cancer in 1992 at age 66. In the wake of his death, the biggest football stadium in Austria, the Praterstadion in Vienna, was renamed the Ernst-Happel-Stadion. Four days after his death, Austria played against Germany and reached a 0–0 draw; Happel's cap lay on the bench during the entire match.

== Managerial statistics ==
Managerial record by team and tenure
Team	From	To	Record							
Team	From	To	G	W	D	L	GF	GA	GD	Win %
ADO Den Haag	1 August 1962	25 May 1967	176	84	43	49	314	230	+84	47.73
San Francisco Golden Gate Gales	26 May 1967	2 July 1967	12	5	3	4	25	19	+6	41.67
ADO Den Haag	30 July 1967	30 May 1969	82	38	24	20	136	88	+48	46.34
Feyenoord	1 August 1969	30 May 1973	169	121	29	19	423	124	+299	71.60
Club Brugge	23 January 1974	26 October 1978	227	131	49	47	491	263	+228	57.71
Netherlands	20 August 1977	30 June 1978	12	8	2	2	32	12	+20	66.67
Hamburger SV	1 July 1981	30 June 1987	250	141	50	59	543	299	+244	56.40
Swarovski Tirol	1 July 1987	1 December 1991	201	114	48	39	428	249	+179	56.72
Austria	1 January 1992	14 November 1992	9	2	3	4	18	17	+1	22.22
Career total			1,137	643	251	243	2,410	1,301	+1109	56.55

=== Club ===
Club	From	To	Competition	Record				
Club	From	To	Competition	P	W	D	L	Win %
Sevilla	2 September 1973	17 December 1973	Segunda División	14	5	4	5	35.71
Sevilla	2 September 1973	17 December 1973	Copa del Generalísimo	1	1	0	0	100.00
Sevilla Total				15	6	4	5	40.00
K.R.C. Harelbeke	11 February 1979	1 May 1979	Second Division	11	6	1	4	54.55
K.R.C. Harelbeke Total				11	6	1	4	54.55
Standard Liège	29 August 1979	17 May 1981	First Division	68	38	15	15	55.88
Standard Liège	29 August 1979	17 May 1981	Belgian Cup	14	12	1	1	85.71
Standard Liège	29 August 1979	17 May 1981	Belgian Super Cup	1	0	1	0	0.00
Standard Liège	29 August 1979	17 May 1981	UEFA Cup	8	4	3	1	50.00
Standard Liège	29 August 1979	17 May 1981	Intertoto Cup	6	2	1	3	33.33
Standard Liège Total				97	56	21	20	57.73
Totals				1,274	707	294	273	55.49

*Dates of first and last games under Happel, not dates of official appointments

== Honours ==
=== Player ===
Rapid Wien

- Austrian Football Bundesliga: 1945–46, 1947–48, 1950–51, 1951–52, 1953–54, 1956–57
- Austrian Cup: 1945–46
- Zentropa Cup: 1951

Austria

- FIFA World Cup third place: 1954

=== Manager ===
ADO Den Haag

- Dutch Cup: 1967–68

Feyenoord

- Eredivisie: 1970–71
- European Cup: 1969–70
- Intercontinental Cup: 1970

Club Brugge

- European Cup runners-up: 1977–78
- UEFA Cup runners-up: 1975–76
- Belgian Championship: 1975–76, 1976–77, 1977–78
- Belgian Cup: 1976–77

Standard Liège

- Belgian Cup: 1980–81

Hamburger SV

- European Cup: 1982–83
- UEFA Cup runners-up: 1981–82
- European Super Cup runners-up: 1983
- Bundesliga: 1981–82, 1982–83
- DFB-Pokal: 1986–87

Swarovski Tirol

- Austrian Championship: 1988–89, 1989–90
- Austrian Cup: 1988–89

Netherlands

- FIFA World Cup runners-up: 1978
- Tournoi de Paris: 1978

=== Individual ===
- France Football 9th Greatest Manager of All Time: 2019
- World Soccer 9th Greatest Manager of All Time: 2013
- ESPN 14th Greatest Manager of All Time: 2013
- FourFourTwo 9th Greatest Manager of All Time: 2023
