= Franz Swoboda =

Austrian footballer

Personal information
- Date of birth: 15 February 1933
- Place of birth: Austria
- Date of death: 27 July 2017 (aged 84)
- Position: Defender

Senior career*
Years	Team	Apps	(Gls)
1950–1961	FK Austria Wien	398	(27)

International career
1955–1960	Austria	23	(0)
- * Club domestic league appearances and goals

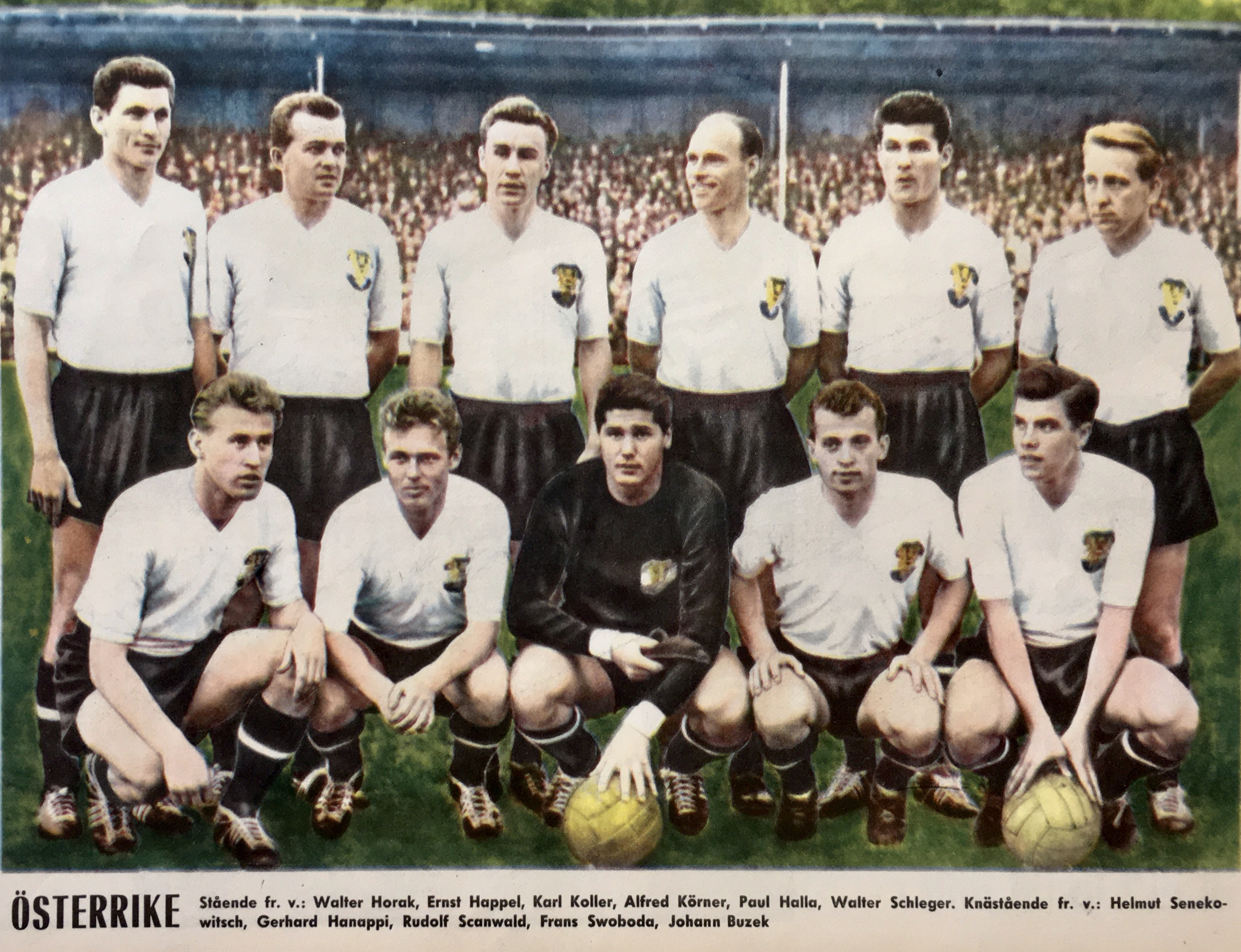
Austria national football team of 1958 with the following players – from left to right, standing; Walter Horak, Ernst Happel, Karl Koller, Alfred Körner, Paul Halla, Walter Schleger; crouched: Helmut Senekowitsch, Gerhard Hanappi, Rudolf Szanwald, Franz Swoboda and Johann Buzek.

Franz Swoboda (15 February 1933 – 27 July 2017) was an Austrian football defender who played for the Austria in the 1958 FIFA World Cup. He also played for the FK Austria Wien.
