= Walter Horak =

Austrian footballer (1931–2019)

Personal information
- Full name: Walter Horak
- Date of birth: 1 June 1931
- Place of birth: Marchegg, Austria
- Date of death: 24 December 2019 (aged 88)
- Place of death: Vienna, Austria
- Height: 1.79 m (5 ft 10 in)
- Position: Striker

Youth career
- Marchegg
- FC Stadlau
- Leopoldsdorf

Senior career*
Years	Team	Apps	(Gls)
1954–1959	Wiener Sport Club	121	(83)
1959–1960	SC Wacker Wien	9	(1)
1961	Grazer AK	12	(3)
1961–1962	Austria Wien	10	(2)
1962	FC Sochaux	19	(6)
1962–1966	1. Schwechater SC	71	(14)
1966–1967	Austria Klagenfurt	1	(0)
Total		243	(109)

International career
1954–1960	Austria	13	(3)
- * Club domestic league appearances and goals

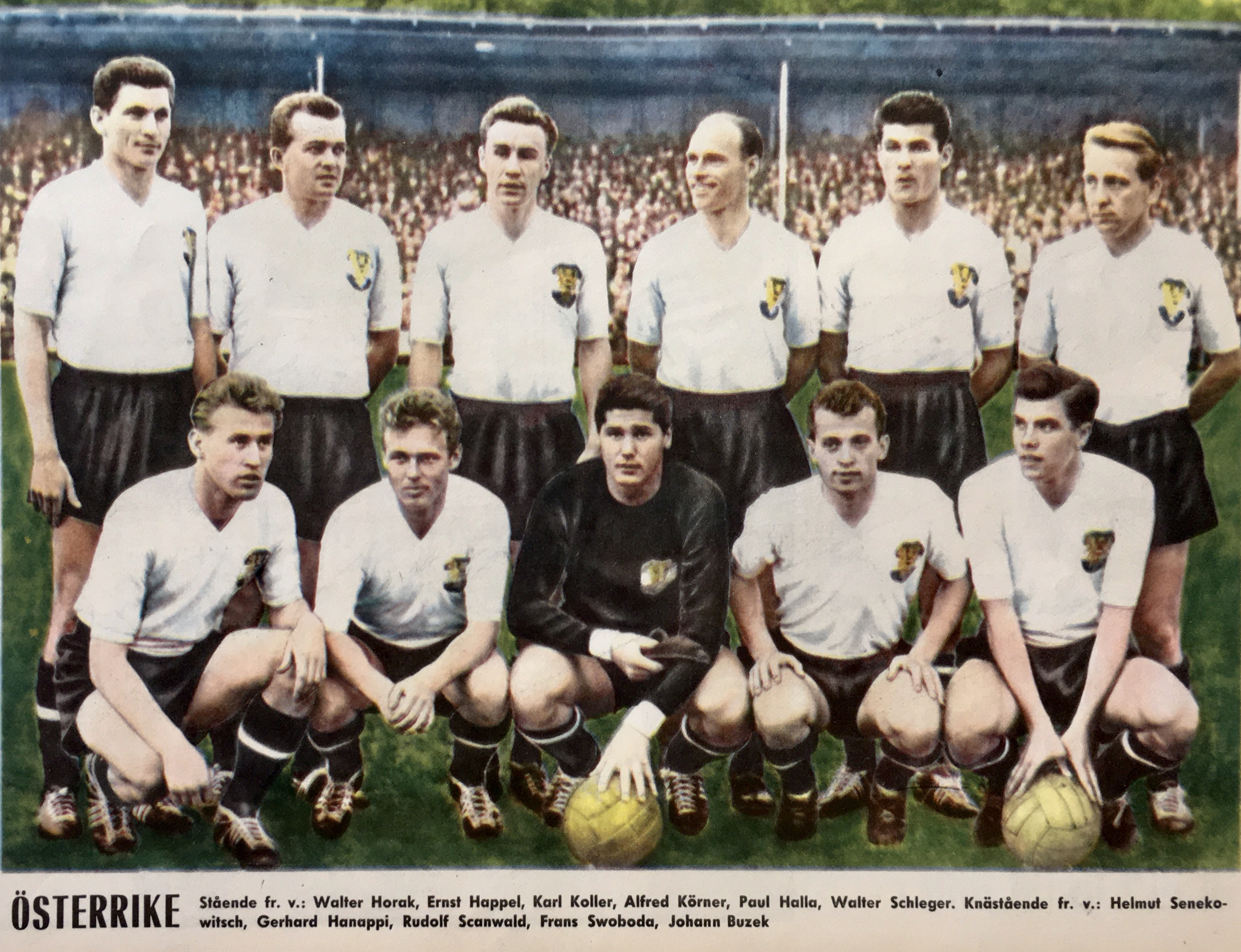
Austria national football team of 1958 with the following players – from left to right, standing; Walter Horak, Ernst Happel, Karl Koller, Alfred Körner, Paul Halla, Walter Schleger; crouched: Helmut Senekowitsch, Gerhard Hanappi, Rudolf Szanwald, Franz Swoboda and Johann Buzek.

Walter Horak (1 June 1931 – 24 December 2019) was an Austrian football player.

== Club career ==
Horak played for several clubs, including Austria Wien, SC Wacker Wien, Grazer AK, and FC Sochaux (France). But with Wiener Sport Club he won two league titles and he topped the final goalscorers chart once.

== International career ==
He made his debut for Austria in November 1954 against Hungary and was a participant at the 1958 FIFA World Cup and the 1960 European Nations' Cup where he scored against France. He earned 13 caps, scoring 3 goals.

== Honours ==
- Austrian Football Bundesliga (3):
  - 1958, 1959, 1962
- Austrian Cup (1):
  - 1962
- Austrian Bundesliga Top Goalscorer (1):
  - 1958
