= Hans Buzek =

Austrian footballer (1938–2026)

Personal information
- Full name: Johann Buzek
- Date of birth: 22 May 1938
- Place of birth: Vienna, Austria
- Date of death: 19 June 2026 (aged 88)
- Height: 1.81 m (5 ft 11 in)
- Position: Forward

Youth career
- 1950–1953: First Vienna FC

Senior career*
Years	Team	Apps	(Gls)
1953–1963	First Vienna FC	163	(138)
1963–1967	Austria Wien	102	(52)
1967–1969	Wiener Sportclub	41	(18)
1969–1970	FC Dornbirn	27	(4)
1970–1972	Rapid Wien	49	(12)
1972–1973	Austria Klagenfurt	23	(3)
Total		405	(227)

International career
1955–1969	Austria	42	(9)
- * Club domestic league appearances and goals

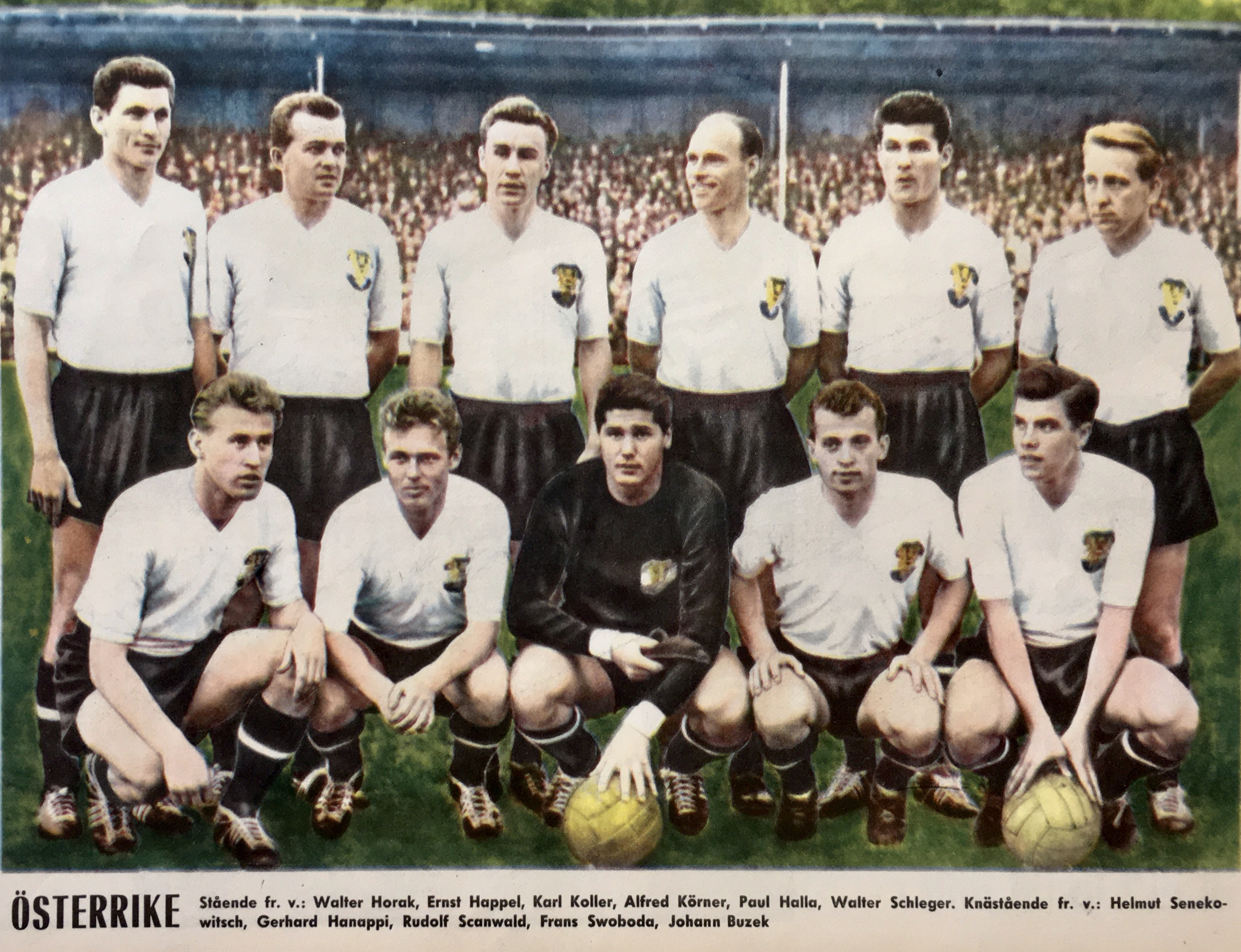
Austria national football team in 1958 with the following players – from left to right, standing; Walter Horak, Ernst Happel, Karl Koller, Alfred Körner, Paul Halla, Walter Schleger; crouched: Helmut Senekowitsch, Gerhard Hanappi, Rudolf Szanwald, Franz Swoboda and Hans Buzek

Johann "Hans" Buzek (22 May 1938 – 19 June 2026) was an Austrian footballer who played as a forward. He was the last Austrian surviving player at World Cup 1958.

== Club career ==
A goldsmith by profession, Buzek came through the youth ranks of First Vienna FC and stayed with them for 13 years. He also played for the other big capital sides Austria Wien, Wiener Sportclub and Rapid Wien. In 1969–70 season he got relegated with FC Dornbirn. After finishing his playing career with Austria Klagenfurt he became a full-time goldsmith in Baden bei Wien.

== International career ==
Buzek made his debut for Austria in an October 1955 match against Yugoslavia and earned a total of 42 caps, scoring 9 goals. Also, he was a participant at the 1958 FIFA World Cup.

== Death ==
Buzek's death at the age of 88 was announced on 19 June 2026.

== Honours ==
First Vienna FC

- Austrian football championship: 1954–55

Austria Wien

- Austrian Cup: 1966–67

Rapid Wien

- Austrian Cup: 1971–72

Individual

- Austrian football championship top goalscorer: 1956, 1966
