= Rudolf Szanwald =

Austrian footballer

Personal information
- Date of birth: 6 July 1931
- Place of birth: Vienna, Austria
- Date of death: 2 January 2013 (aged 81)
- Position: Goalkeeper

Senior career*
Years	Team	Apps	(Gls)
1946–1966	Wiener Sport-Club	486	(0)
1966–1967	FC Kärnten		
1967–1970	FK Austria Wien		

International career
1955–1965	Austria	12	(0)
- * Club domestic league appearances and goals

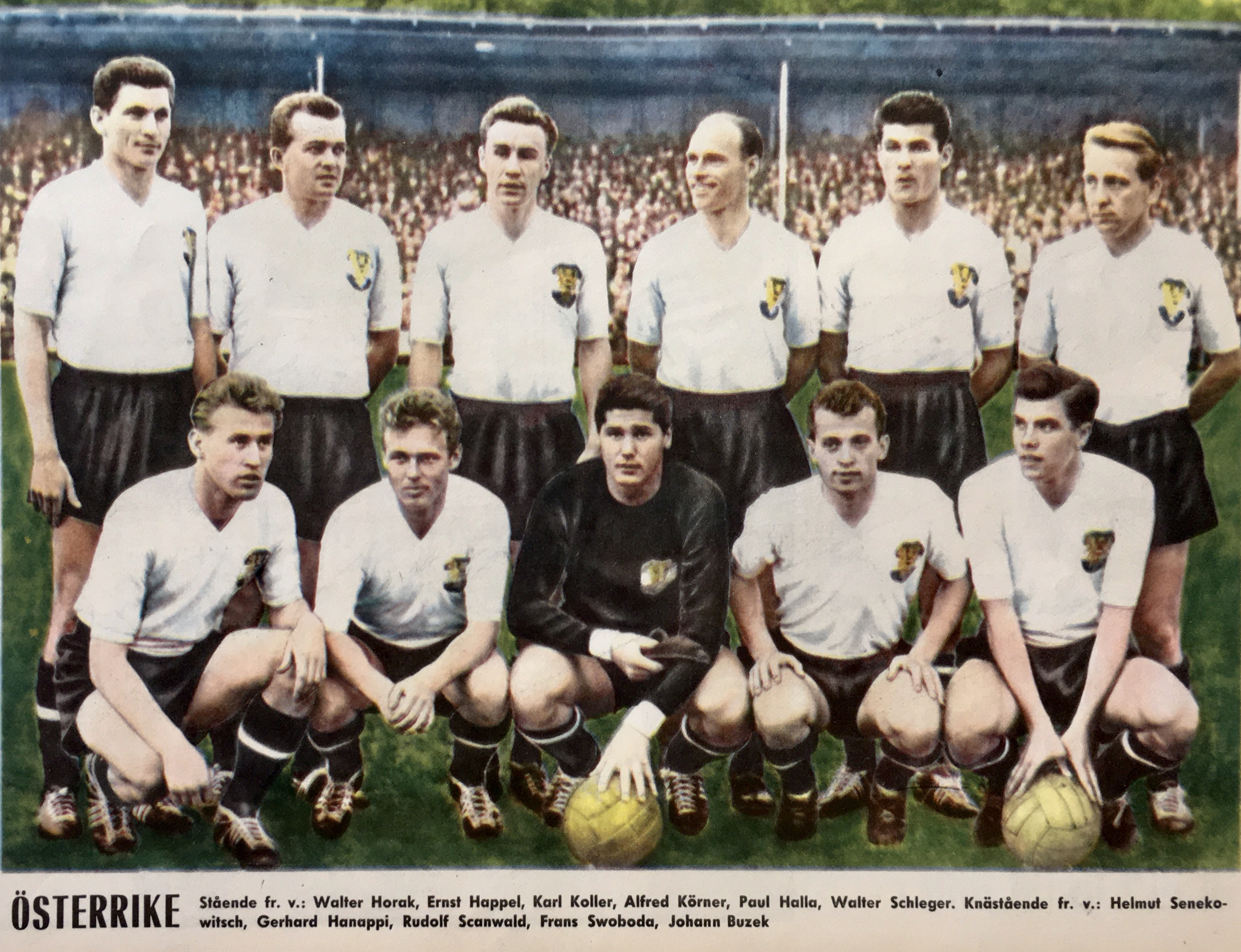
Austria national football team of 1958 with the following players – from left to right, standing; Walter Horak, Ernst Happel, Karl Koller, Alfred Körner, Paul Halla, Walter Schleger; crouched: Helmut Senekowitsch, Gerhard Hanappi, Rudolf Szanwald, Franz Swoboda and Johann Buzek.

Rudolf Szanwald (6 July 1931 – 2 January 2013) was an Austrian football goalkeeper who played for Austria in the 1958 FIFA World Cup. He also played for Wiener Sport-Club, FC Kärnten, and FK Austria Wien.
