= Aleksandr Ivanov (footballer, born 1928) =

Soviet footballer

Personal information
- Full name: Aleksandr Ivanovich Ivanov
- Date of birth: April 14, 1928
- Place of birth: Leningrad, USSR
- Date of death: March 29, 1997 (aged 68)
- Place of death: Saint Petersburg, Russia
- Position: Striker

Youth career
- Trudovye Rezervy Leningrad

Senior career*
| Years | Team | Apps | (Gls) |
| 1950–1960 | Zenit Leningrad | 220 | (47) |

International career
| 1958–1959 | USSR | 5 | (1) |

Managerial career
- ?: LOMO Leningrad
- * Club domestic league appearances and goals

Aleksandr Ivanovich Ivanov (Russian: Александр Иванович Иванов) (April 14, 1928 – March 29, 1997) was a Soviet football player.

== International career ==
Ivanov made his debut for USSR on June 8, 1958, in a 1958 FIFA World Cup game against England, scoring a goal on his debut.
