= Walter Schleger =

Austrian footballer (1929–1999)

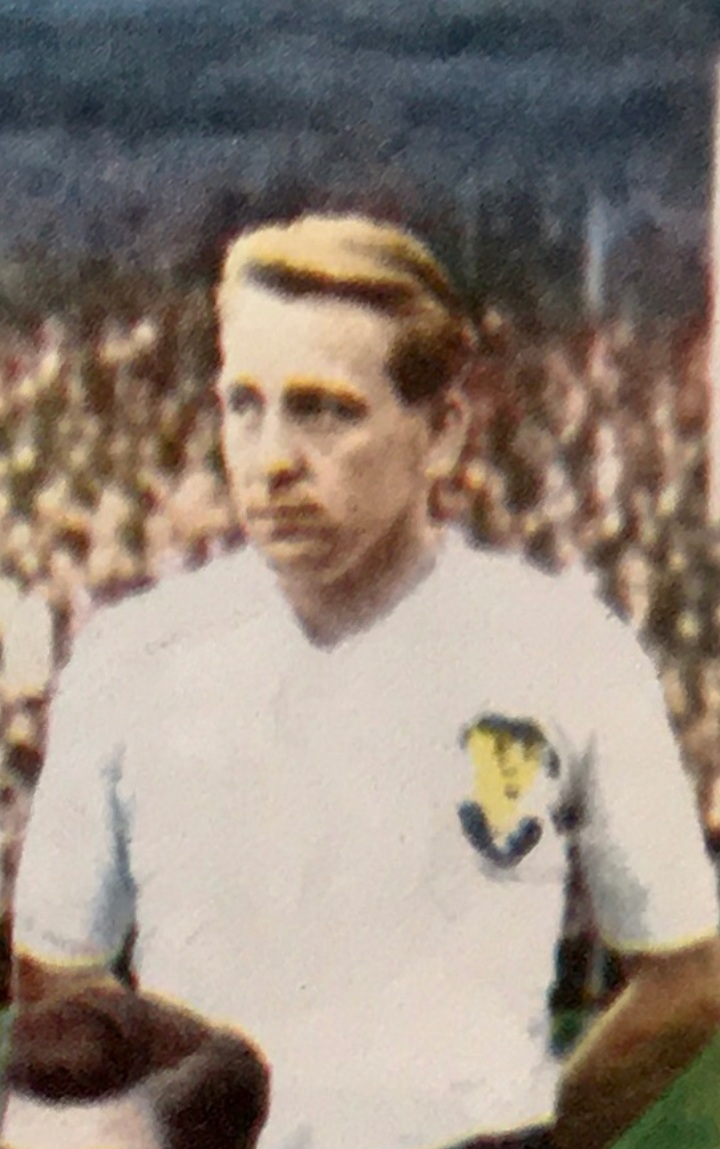

Personal information
- Date of birth: 19 September 1929
- Place of birth: Prague, Czechoslovakia
- Date of death: 3 December 1999 (aged 70)
- Position: Striker

Youth career
- AC Sparta Prague

Senior career*
Years	Team	Apps	(Gls)
1949–1951	Wiener Sportclub		
1951–1964	Austria Wien	334	(107)

International career
1951–1962	Austria	22	(1)
Medal record
Representing Austria
FIFA World Cup
Third place	1954 Switzerland
- * Club domestic league appearances and goals

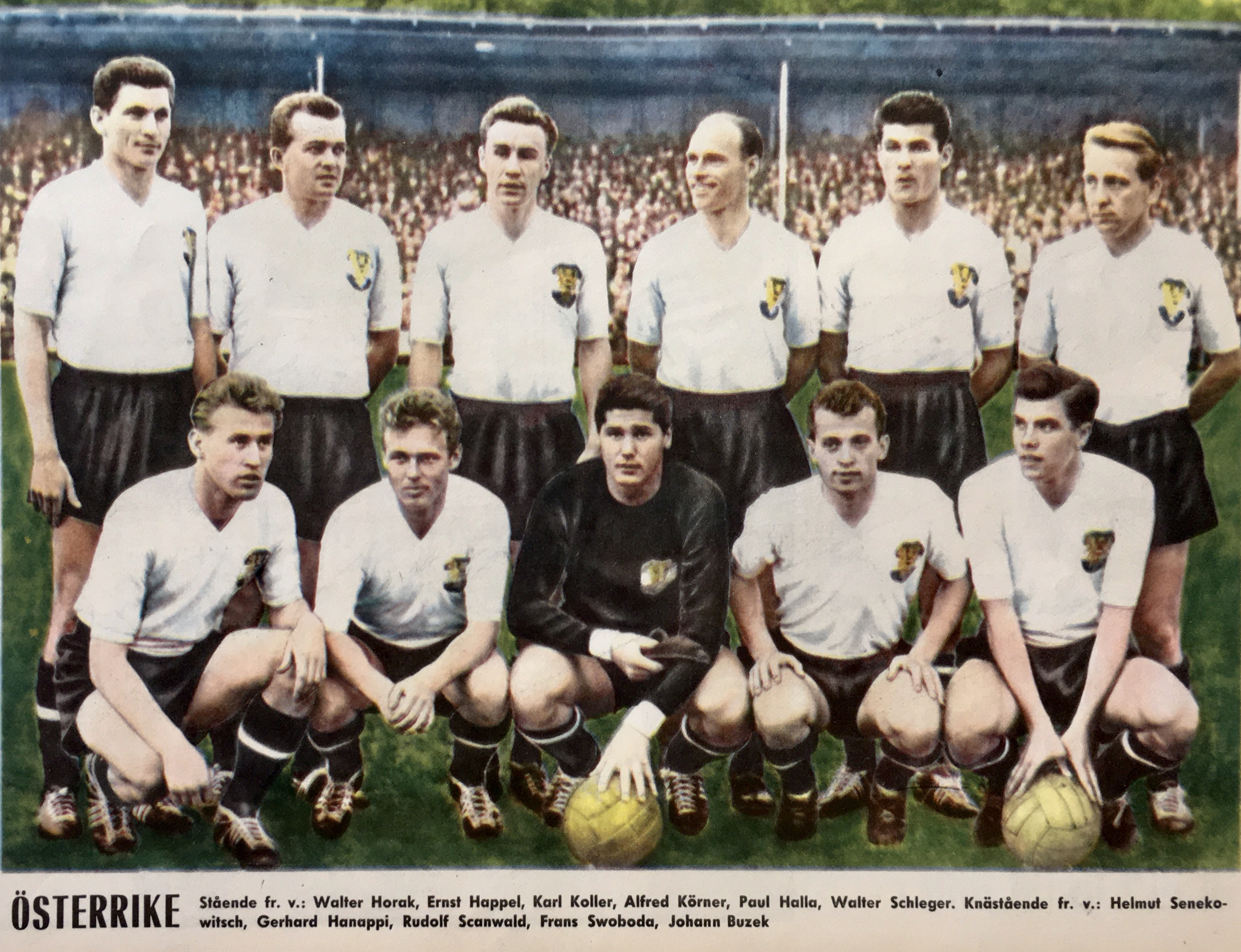
Austria national football team of 1958 with the following players – from left to right, standing; Walter Horak, Ernst Happel, Karl Koller, Alfred Körner, Paul Halla, Walter Schleger; crouched: Helmut Senekowitsch, Gerhard Hanappi, Rudolf Szanwald, Franz Swoboda and Johann Buzek.

Walter Schleger (19 September 1929 – 3 December 1999) was an Austrian football player.

== Club career ==
A speedy and tricky attacker, Schleger played for several clubs: he began his career in Sparta Prague, where he played in their youth team, later went to Vienna and played for Wiener Sportclub (1949–1951) and Austria Wien (1951–1964).

A veterinarian, he later became head of the genetics institute at the University of Veterinary Medicine Vienna.

== International career ==
He made his debut for Austria in a September 1951 friendly match against West Germany and was a participant at the 1954 FIFA World Cup and 1958 FIFA World Cup. He earned 22 caps, scoring one goal.

== Honours ==
- Austrian Football Bundesliga (4):
  - 1953, 1961, 1962, 1963
- Austrian Cup (3):
  - 1960, 1962, 1963
