= Rudolf Horváth =

Slovak handball player (born 1947)

Rudolf Horváth (born June 28, 1947) is a former Slovak handball player.

He played for Czechoslovakia and won the gold medal in the 1967 World Men's Handball Championship in Sweden.
