= 1969–70 Austrian Cup =

Tournament details
- Country: Austria

Final positions
- Champions: Wacker Innsbruck
- Runner-up: Linzer ASK

The 1969–70 Austrian Cup (German: ÖFB-Cup) was the 36th season of Austria's nationwide football cup competition. The final was held at the Bundesstadion Südstadt, Maria Enzersdorf on 28 May 1970.

The competition was won by Wacker Innsbruck after beating Linzer ASK 1–0.

== Preliminary round ==
Team 1	Score	Team 2
10 August 1969
1. Schwechater SC	6–2	Kapfenberger SV

== First round ==
Team 1	Score	Team 2
9 August 1969
SC Austria Lustenau	0–2	Wiener Sport-Club
BSV Enzesfeld-Hirtenberg	0–1	SK Austria Klagenfurt
FC Lustenau	0–3	Linzer ASK
Floridsdorfer AC	1–7	Admira Wien
RW Knittelfeld	0–3	Grazer AK
Salzburger AK 1914	2–5	FK Austria Wien
SV Urfahr	0–1	SK Rapid Wien
WSG Radenthein	3–2	SC Eisenstadt
WSV Donawitz	3–3 (a.e.t.)	First Vienna FC
10 August 1969
SC Kundl	2–3	SK Sturm Graz
Schwarz-Weiß Bregenz	2–1	FC Dornbirn
UFC Frauenkirchen	4–2	Wacker Wien
SK Bischofshofen	2–3	FC Wacker Innsbruck
Rapid Lienz	1–4	WSG Wattens
SC Tulln	2–1 (a.e.t.)	SV Austria Salzburg
15 August 1969
1. Schwechater SC	4–1	SK VÖEST Linz
Replay: 17 August 1969
First Vienna FC	3–1	WSV Donawitz

== Second round ==
Team 1	Score	Team 2
17 September 1969
Linzer ASK	6–0	Admira Wien
20 September 1969
SC Tulln	2–3	Schwarz-Weiß Bregenz
SK Sturm Graz	1–0	SK Austria Klagenfurt
2 November 1969
Grazer AK	3–2	WSG Wattens
14 December 1969
FK Austria Wien	0–1	WSG Radenthein
1 February 1970
First Vienna FC	1–0	Wiener Sport-Club
8 February 1970
SK Rapid Wien	3–5	FC Wacker Innsbruck
30 March 1970
1. Schwechater SC	5–0	UFC Frauenkirchen

== Quarter-finals ==
Team 1	Score	Team 2
11 April 1970
Schwarz-Weiß Bregenz	6–2	1. Schwechater SC
15 April 1970
FC Wacker Innsbruck	3–2	Grazer AK
SK Sturm Graz	3–2 (a.e.t.)	First Vienna FC
Linzer ASK	4–0	WSG Radenthein

== Semi-finals ==
Team 1	Score	Team 2
7 May 1970
FC Wacker Innsbruck	2–0	SK Sturm Graz
Schwarz-Weiß Bregenz	2–2 (a.e.t.)	Linzer ASK
Replay: 20 May 1970
Linzer ASK	3–3 (a.e.t.)^{1}	Schwarz-Weiß Bregenz

- ^{1} Linzer ASK won on the drawing lots.

== Final ==
28 May 1970
18:00

FC Wacker Innsbruck	1–0	Linzer ASK
Ettmayer 53'	Report

Bundesstadion Südstadt, Maria Enzersdorf
Attendance: 1,800
Referee: Franz Wöhrer
