= Ove Flindt Bjerg =

Danish footballer (born 1948)

Personal information
- Date of birth: 21 July 1948 (age 78)
- Place of birth: Aalborg, Denmark
- Height: 1.79 m (5 ft 10 in)
- Position: Midfielder

Senior career*
Years	Team	Apps	(Gls)
1968–1971	AaB		
1971–1976	SSW Innsbruck	142	(51)
1976–1978	Karlsruher SC	72	(11)
1978–1979	AaB		
1979	San Jose Earthquakes	23	(2)
1979–1982	SK VOEST Linz	79	(9)
1983	Nørresundby BK		
1984–1987	AaB		

International career
1970–1979	Denmark	18	(1)
- * Club domestic league appearances and goals

Ove Flindt Bjerg (born 21 July 1948) is a Danish former professional footballer who played as a midfielder. He made 18 appearances for the Denmark national team from 1970 to 1979.
