= Josef Argauer =

Austrian football coach (1910–2004)

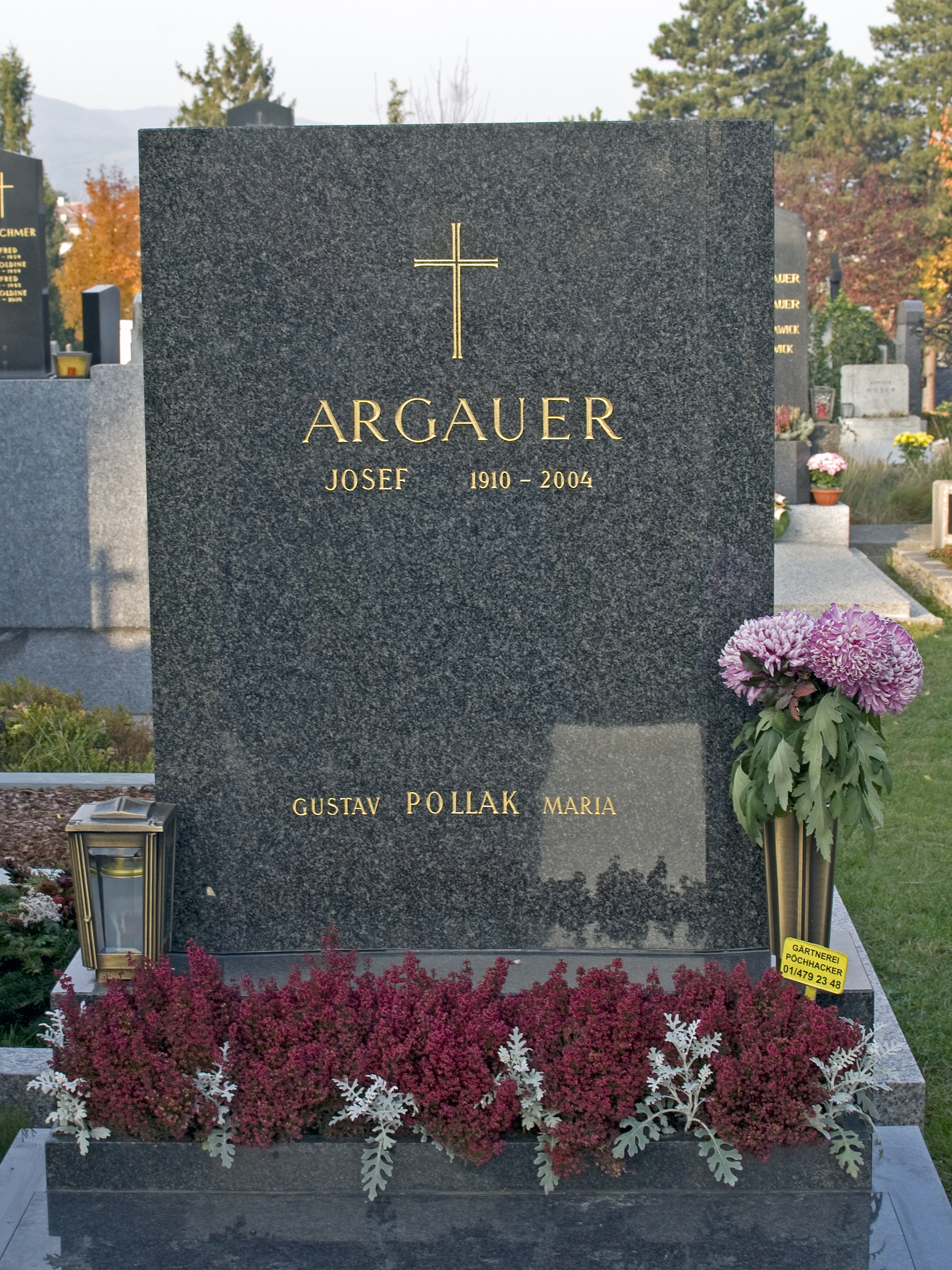
- Grave of Josef Argauer at Gersthof cemetery in Vienna

Personal information
- Date of birth: 15 November 1910
- Place of birth: Vienna, Austria
- Date of death: 10 October 2004 (aged 93)

Managerial career
- Years: Team
- Austria

Josef Argauer (15 November 1910 – 10 October 2004) was an Austrian football coach. He was the coach of the Austria national team during the 1958 FIFA World Cup.
