= Paul Halla =

Austrian footballer

Personal information
- Full name: Paul Halla
- Date of birth: 10 April 1931
- Place of birth: Graz, Austria
- Date of death: 6 December 2005 (aged 74)
- Place of death: Vienna, Austria
- Position: Defender

Senior career*
Years	Team	Apps	(Gls)
1950–1951	Sturm Graz		
1951–1953	Grazer AK	47	(24)
1953–1965	Rapid Wien	289	(39)
1965–1967	Helfort		

International career
1952–1965	Austria	34	(2)
Medal record
Representing Austria
FIFA World Cup
Third place	1954 Switzerland
- * Club domestic league appearances and goals

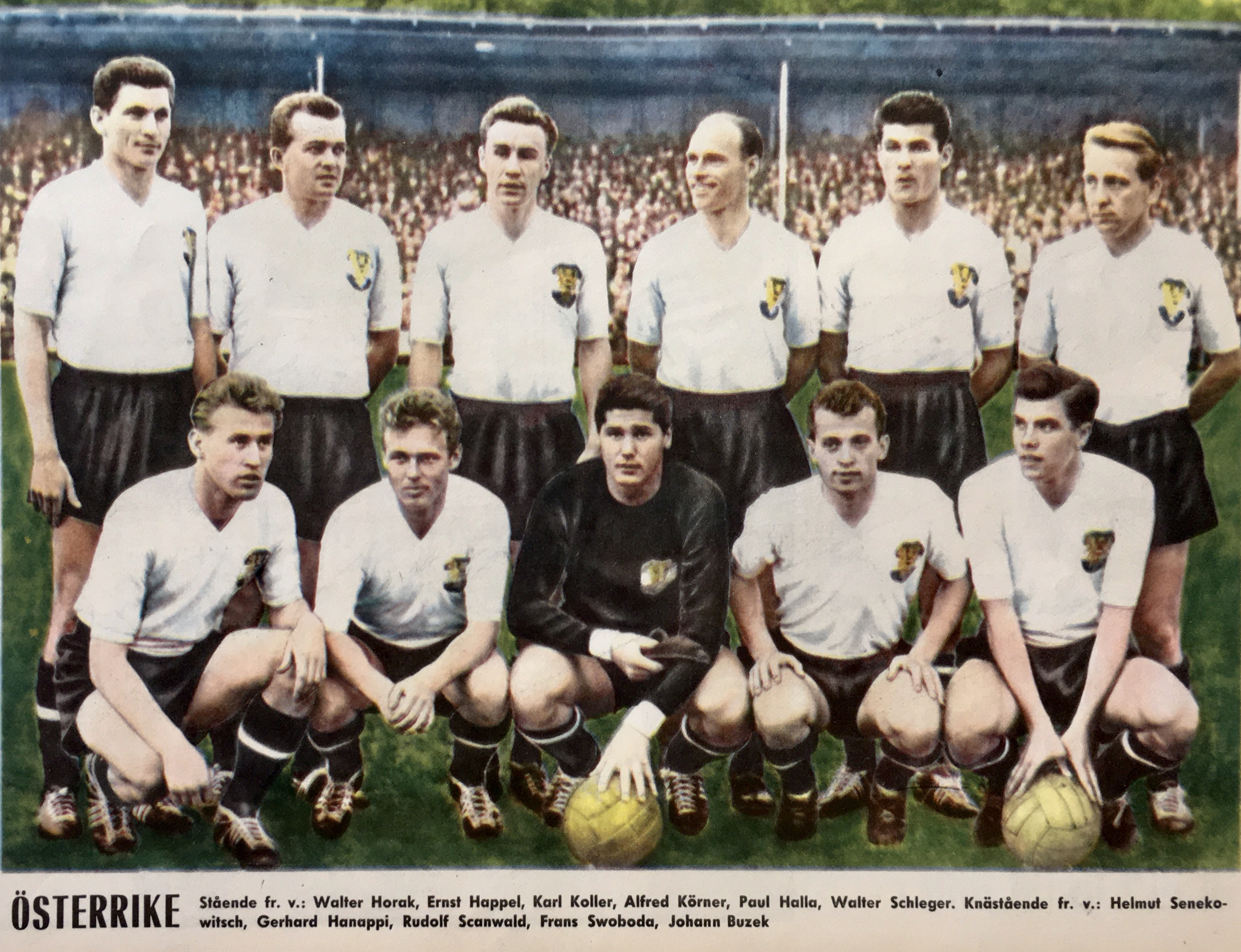
Austria national football team of 1958 with the following players – from left to right, standing; Walter Horak, Ernst Happel, Karl Koller, Alfred Körner, Paul Halla, Walter Schleger; crouched: Helmut Senekowitsch, Gerhard Hanappi, Rudolf Szanwald, Franz Swoboda and Johann Buzek.

Paul Halla (10 April 1931 – 6 December 2005) was an Austrian footballer.

== Club career ==
He played for SK Sturm Graz, Grazer AK and SK Rapid Wien (1953–1965). He skippered Rapid in his final season there.

== International career ==
He earned 34 caps and scored 2 goals for the Austria national football team from 1954 to 1965, and participated in the 1954 FIFA World Cup and the 1958 FIFA World Cup.

== Death ==
He died in a Vienna hospital in December 2005 after stomach surgery.

== Honours ==
- Austrian Football Bundesliga (5):
  - 1954, 1956, 1957, 1960, 1964
- Austrian Cup (1):
  - 1961
