= 1972–73 Austrian football championship =

55th season of top-tier football league in Austria

Austrian Nationalliga
- Season: 1972–73
- Champions: FC Wacker Innsbruck

Statistics of Austrian Nationalliga in the 1972–73 season.

== Overview ==
It was contested by 16 teams, and FC Wacker Innsbruck won the championship.

== League standings ==
Pos	Team	Pld	W	D	L	GF	GA	GD	Pts
1	FC Wacker Innsbruck	30	18	7	5	57	25	+32	43
2	SK Rapid Wien	30	16	8	6	50	31	+19	40
3	Grazer AK	30	13	10	7	44	26	+18	36
4	FC Admira/Wacker	30	14	8	8	37	30	+7	36
5	VÖEST Linz	30	14	7	9	53	32	+21	35
6	Linzer ASK	30	11	12	7	45	35	+10	34
7	SV Austria Salzburg	30	13	6	11	40	37	+3	32
8	Wiener Sportclub	30	11	9	10	39	40	−1	31
9	Donawitzer SV Alpine	30	10	9	11	36	52	−16	29
10	FK Austria Wien	30	11	5	14	53	43	+10	27
11	First Vienna FC	30	10	7	13	40	50	−10	27
12	Austria Klagenfurt	30	11	4	15	32	47	−15	26
13	SC Eisenstadt	30	10	5	15	37	41	−4	25
14	SK Sturm Graz	30	8	9	13	29	38	−9	25
15	Schwarz-Weiß Bregenz	30	9	4	17	36	54	−18	22
16	SV Admira Wiener Neustadt	30	3	6	21	23	70	−47	12

Source: rsssf.com

== Results ==
Home \ Away	ADM	AWN	KLA	ASZ	AWI	BRE	DON	EIS	FIR	GAK	LIN	RWI	WKR	STU	VOE	WIE
Admira/Wacker		1–0	0–0	1–3	1–0	2–0	0–2	1–0	1–1	0–0	2–2	0–1	2–0	2–0	2–0	0–0
Admira Wiener Neustadt	0–1		1–2	0–2	1–5	1–1	0–0	1–0	0–1	2–6	1–1	1–2	0–5	1–1	3–2	1–2
Austria Klagenfurt	0–0	5–2		1–0	2–0	2–0	4–1	0–1	3–0	1–2	0–5	2–3	0–5	1–0	0–3	0–1
Austria Salzburg	3–1	2–2	2–0		1–2	2–0	1–2	0–2	3–1	1–1	2–2	2–0	1–0	2–1	0–1	0–0
Austria Wien	1–2	3–1	5–0	1–2		2–1	1–2	0–3	2–3	1–0	2–0	0–1	2–2	5–0	0–0	2–2
Bregenz	1–3	4–1	0–1	2–0	2–1		4–1	2–0	4–2	2–4	0–0	2–0	1–3	2–0	1–6	0–2
Donawitzer SV Alpine	3–7	1–0	2–0	0–0	0–3	3–1		0–3	2–1	1–1	2–2	0–1	0–0	0–0	3–3	1–0
Eisenstadt	1–2	3–0	1–0	2–5	3–1	2–2	1–1		0–1	3–2	0–3	1–1	0–1	0–1	0–1	0–3
First Vienna	2–1	7–0	1–0	2–1	0–2	3–1	0–1	3–1		2–0	2–4	0–0	0–4	1–1	3–6	1–4
Grazer AK	3–1	1–2	1–1	0–1	1–0	2–0	1–1	1–1	0–0		0–1	1–1	0–1	4–0	1–0	1–0
Linzer ASK	0–1	1–1	0–1	0–0	0–0	0–1	2–0	4–1	1–1	0–5		2–1	1–0	1–1	2–0	5–0
Rapid Wien	2–1	2–1	5–2	2–0	2–2	2–0	2–1	1–1	1–1	0–1	2–3		0–1	3–1	1–1	6–0
Wacker Innsbruck	1–1	1–0	1–1	4–2	2–1	3–0	7–1	2–1	3–1	1–2	2–1	2–2		1–0	1–1	1–3
Sturm Graz	0–0	5–0	1–0	1–2	1–5	3–0	2–1	1–0	1–0	1–1	5–0	0–1	0–1		1–3	1–1
VÖEST Linz	4–0	2–0	0–2	2–0	6–3	2–1	3–1	0–2	3–0	1–1	0–0	0–2	0–1	0–0		3–0
Wiener SC	0–1	1–0	4–1	4–0	2–1	1–1	2–3	1–4	0–0	0–1	2–2	2–3	1–1	0–0	1–0	

Legend: Blue = home team win; Yellow = draw; Red = away team win.
