= Adolf Antrich =

Austrian footballer (1940–2024)

Personal information
- Date of birth: 8 December 1940
- Place of birth: Leoben, Reichsgau Steiermark, Nazi Germany
- Date of death: 28 August 2024 (aged 83)
- Position: Goalkeeper

Senior career*
| Years | Team | Apps | (Gls) |
- WSV Donawitz
| –1967 | Kapfenberger SV | | |
| 1967–1969 | Schwarz-Weiß Bregenz | 28 | (0) |
| 1969–1970 | Austria Klagenfurt | 29 | (0) |
| 1970–1971 | Austria Salzburg | 30 | (0) |
| 1971–1975 | Rapid Wien | 61 | (0) |
| 1975–1977 | Donawitzer SV Alpine | | |

International career
| 1971 | Austria | 2 | (0) |
- * Club domestic league appearances and goals

Adolf Antrich (8 December 1940 – 28 August 2024) was an Austrian footballer who played as a goalkeeper. He made two appearances for the Austria national team in 1971.

Antrich played five seasons of club football for Kapfenberger SV before joining Rapid Wien late in his career, where he won the 1971–72 Austrian Cup. While playing for Rapid, Antrich had a streak of 784 minutes without conceding a goal, the seventh longest in the history of the Austrian Bundesliga as of August 2012.

Antrich died on 28 August 2024, at the age of 83.
