= Erwin Fuchsbichler =

Austrian footballer

Personal information
- Date of birth: 27 March 1952 (age 74)
- Place of birth: Kapfenberg, Austria
- Height: 6 ft 3 in (1.91 m)
- Position: Goalkeeper

Senior career*
Years	Team	Apps	(Gls)
1969–1970	Kapfenberger SV		
1970–1973	SK Rapid Wien		
1974–1988	SK VÖEST Linz		
1988–1989	SK Vorwärts Steyr		

International career
1978	Austria	4	(0)
- * Club domestic league appearances and goals

Erwin Fuchsbichler (born 27 March 1952) is an Austrian football goalkeeper who played for Austria in the 1978 FIFA World Cup. He also played for Kapfenberger SV, SK Rapid Wien, SK VÖEST Linz, and SK Vorwärts Steyr.
