= Bernd Lorenz =

German footballer (1947–2005)

Personal information
- Date of birth: 24 December 1947
- Place of birth: Hamburg, West Germany
- Date of death: 6 April 2005 (aged 56)
- Height: 1.85 m (6 ft 1 in)
- Position: Forward

Senior career*
Years	Team	Apps	(Gls)
1966–1969	TSV DUWO 08		
1969–1971	Werder Bremen	51	(10)
1971–1974	Rapid Wien	44	(16)
1974–1976	Eintracht Frankfurt	30	(13)
1976–1977	Young Boys		
1977–1978	FC Augsburg	13	(3)
1978–1979	First Vienna FC	26	(13)
1979–1980	VfB Mödling	7	(2)
- * Club domestic league appearances and goals

Bernd Lorenz (24 December 1947 – 6 April 2005) was a German footballer who played as a forward. During his career he played for TSV DUWO 08, Werder Bremen, Rapid Wien, Eintracht Frankfurt, BSC Young Boys, FC Augsburg, First Vienna FC and VfB Mödling.

== Honours ==
Eintracht Frankfurt

- DFB-Pokal
  - Winner: 1974–75

Rapid Wien

- Austrian Cup:
  - Winner: 1971–72
  - Runner-up: 1972–73
- Austrian championship:
  - Runner-up: 1972–73

BSC Young Boys

- Swiss Cup:
  - Winner: 1976–77
