= Norbert Hof =

Austrian footballer (1944–2020)

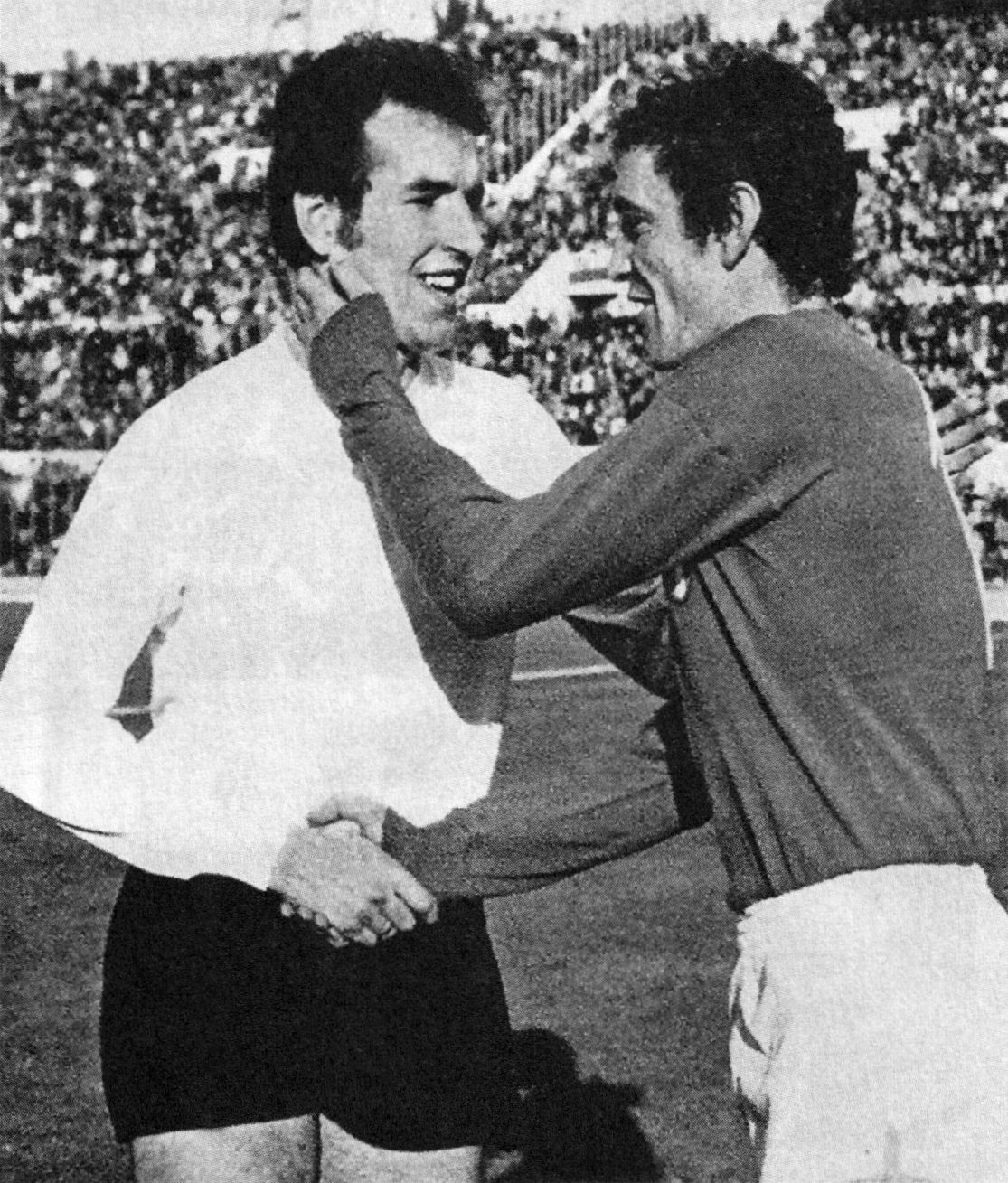
- Hof (left) and Gigi Riva in 1971

Personal information
- Date of birth: 2 February 1944
- Date of death: 8 July 2020 (aged 76)
- Position: Defender

Senior career*
Years	Team	Apps	(Gls)
1962–1964	Wiener Sport-Club	12	(2)
1964–1965	Wacker Wien	23	(1)
1965–1969	Wiener Sport-Club	93	(4)
1969–1970	Hamburger SV	29	(2)
1970–1971	Wiener Sport-Club	29	(4)
1971–1976	Rapid Wien	147	(6)
1976–1980	Wiener Sport-Club	81	(1)

International career
1968–1974	Austria	31	(1)
- * Club domestic league appearances and goals

Norbert Hof (2 February 1944 – 8 July 2020) was an Austrian footballer who played as a defender. He was the brother of footballer Erich Hof.

Scores and results list Austria's goal tally first, score column indicates score after each Hof goal.

List of international goals scored by Norbert Hof
No.	Date	Venue	Opponent	Score	Result	Competition	Ref.
1	30 April 1972	Praterstadion, Vienna, Austria	Malta	4-0	4–0	1974 FIFA World Cup qualification	
