= Geza Gallos =

Austrian footballer (1948–2013)

Geza Gallos (7 September 1948 – 3 November 2013) was an Austrian footballer who played as a forward. He played for Eisenstadt, Rapid Wien, Linzer ASK, Admira Wacker and Neusiedl am See. He also won six caps for Austria.
