= FC Wacker Innsbruck =

Austrian football club, based in Innsbruck

- Full name: Fußballclub Wacker Innsbruck
- Founded: 4 February 1915; 111 years ago
- Dissolved: 20 May 1999; 27 years ago
- League: Austrian 1. Klasse
- 1998-99: unknown
Home colours

FC Wacker Innsbruck was an Austrian association football club from Innsbruck, Tyrol.

== History ==
The Fußball-Club Wacker ("Valiant") Innsbruck was established in 1915 by Jakob Hanspeter, Benedikt Hosp, Josef Leitner, Josef Albrecht and other now unknown football enthusiasts and adopted club colours of black and green. After a few years playing friendlies against other Innsbruck sides, the club was put on hiatus until 1918 because of the interruption of the First World War. In 1964 the club participated the first time in Austria's A-Liga, today's Bundesliga, winning its first championship in 1971.

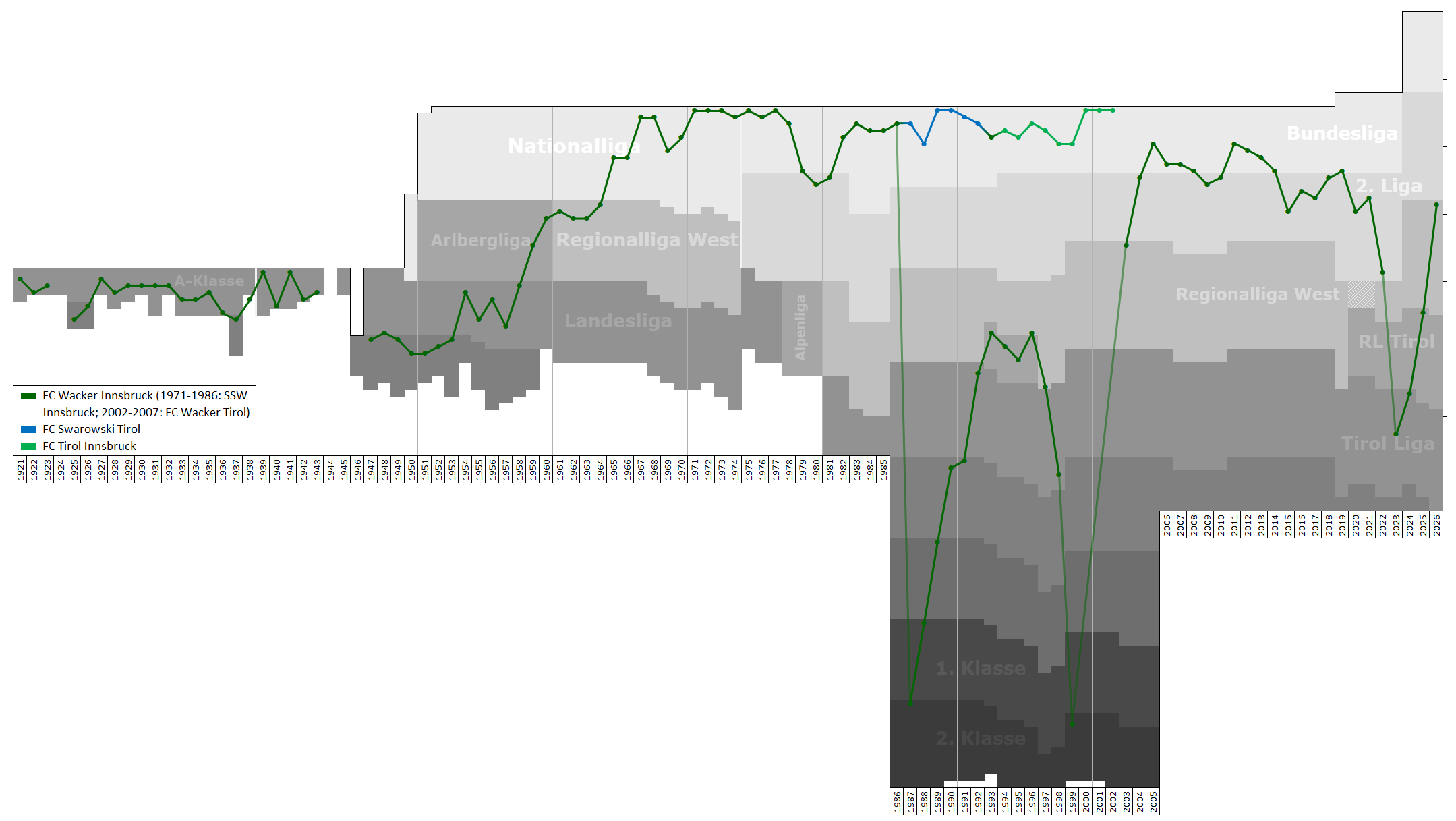
Historical chart of FC Wacker Innsbruck league performance (incl. mergers and successor clubs)

On 20 July 1971, FC Wacker Innsbruck and SV Wattens, also playing in Austrian first division, merged to form a single team called SpG Swarovski Wattens-Innsbruck (SSW Innsbruck) in order to focus the football power of Tyrol better. The union applied only to the professional footballers – the junior sides of both teams carried on as part of their original clubs. SSW Innsbruck won the Austrian Championship five times and reached the quarterfinals in the 1977–78 European Cup.

In 1981 SSW Innsbruck was relegated the first time and in 1986 the club was renamed FC Wacker Innsbruck. After the new club FC Swarovski Tirol took over the license of the club, FC Wacker Innsbruck was forced to play in the eighth division, quickly managing to reach the fourth division in 1992. In the same year the FC Swarovski was dissolved and Wacker regained the Bundesliga license and access to the 1992–93 UEFA Cup. They nevertheless played in the Bundesliga only for one season, as in 1993 the FC Tirol Innsbruck was formed, to which FC Wacker again lost its license. In 1999 the club, meanwhile playing in the seventh division, finally folded.

== Honours ==
=== National ===
- Austrian Bundesliga
  - Champions (5): 1970–71, 1971–72, 1972–73, 1974–75, 1976–77
- Austrian Cup
  - Winners (6): 1969–70, 1972–73, 1974–75, 1977–78, 1978–79, 1992–93

=== International ===
- Mitropa Cup
  - Winners: 1974–75, 1975–76

== European cup history ==
QF = Quarterfinal

Season	Competition	Round	Country	Club	Home	Away	Aggregate
1970–71	UEFA Cup Winners' Cup	1	(Albania)	Partizani	3–2	2–1	5–3
1970–71	UEFA Cup Winners' Cup	2	(Spain)	Real Madrid	0–2	1–0	1–2
1971–72	European Cup	1	(Portugal)	Benfica	1–3	0–4	1–7
1972–73	European Cup	1	(Ukraine)	Dynamo Kyiv	0–1	0–2	0–3
1973–74	European Cup	1	(Bulgaria)	CSKA Sofia	0–1	0–3	0–4
1974–75	UEFA Cup	1	(Germany)	Borussia Mönchengladbach	2–1	0–3	2–4
1975–76	European Cup	1	(Germany)	Borussia Mönchengladbach	1–1	1–6	2–7
1976–77	UEFA Cup	1	(Norway)	IK Start	2–1	5–0	7–1
1976–77	UEFA Cup	2	(Hungary)	Videoton	1–1	0–1	1–2
1977–78	European Cup	1	(Switzerland)	Basel	0–1	3–1	3–2
1977–78	European Cup	2	(Scotland)	Celtic	3–0	1–2	4–2
1977–78	European Cup	3	(Germany)	Borussia Mönchengladbach	3–1	0–2	3–3
1978–79	UEFA Cup Winner's Cup	1	(Poland)	Zagłębie Sosnowiec	3–2	1–1	4–3
1978–79	UEFA Cup Winner's Cup	2	(England)	Ipswich Town	0–1	1–1	1–2
1979–80	UEFA Cup Winners' Cup	1	(Czechoslovakia)	FC Lokomotíva Košice	1–2	0–1	1–3
1983–84	UEFA Cup Winners' Cup	1	(Germany)	FC Koln	1–0	1–7	2–7
1984–85	UEFA Cup	1	(Spain)	Real Madrid	2–0	0–5	2–5
1985–86	UEFA Cup	1	(Belgium)	RFC Liege	1–3	0–1	1–4
1992–93	UEFA Cup	1	(Italy)	Roma	1–4	0–1	1–5

== Managers ==
- (Socialist Federal Republic of Yugoslavia) Otto Barić (1 Jan 1971 – 31 Dec 1971)
- (Socialist Federal Republic of Yugoslavia) Branko Elsner (1 July 1974 – 30 June 1976)
- (Austria) Fritz Pfister (1 July 1976 – 30 June 1977)
- (West Germany) Georg Keßler (1977–78)
- (Austria) Johann Eigenstiller (1979)
- (Hungary) Lajos Baróti (1 Jan 1979 – 30 June 1979)
- (West Germany) Peter Velhorn (1 July 1979 – 20 Feb 1980)
- (Austria) Franz Wolny (1 Jan 1980 – 28 Aug 1983)
- (Austria) Heinz Binder (Sept 1, 1983–30 June 1984)
- (Netherlands) Cor Brom (1 July 1984 – 23 April 1985)
- (Austria) Werner Schwarz (24 April 1985 – 30 June 1985)
- (Austria) Felix Latzke (1 July 1985 – 30 June 1987)
- (Slovenia) Branko Elsner (1 July 1992 – 31 Dec 1992)
- (Austria) Walter Skocik (1 Jan 1993 – 31 May 1993)
