= Willibald Ruttensteiner =

Austrian football manager (born 1962)

Willie Ruttensteiner
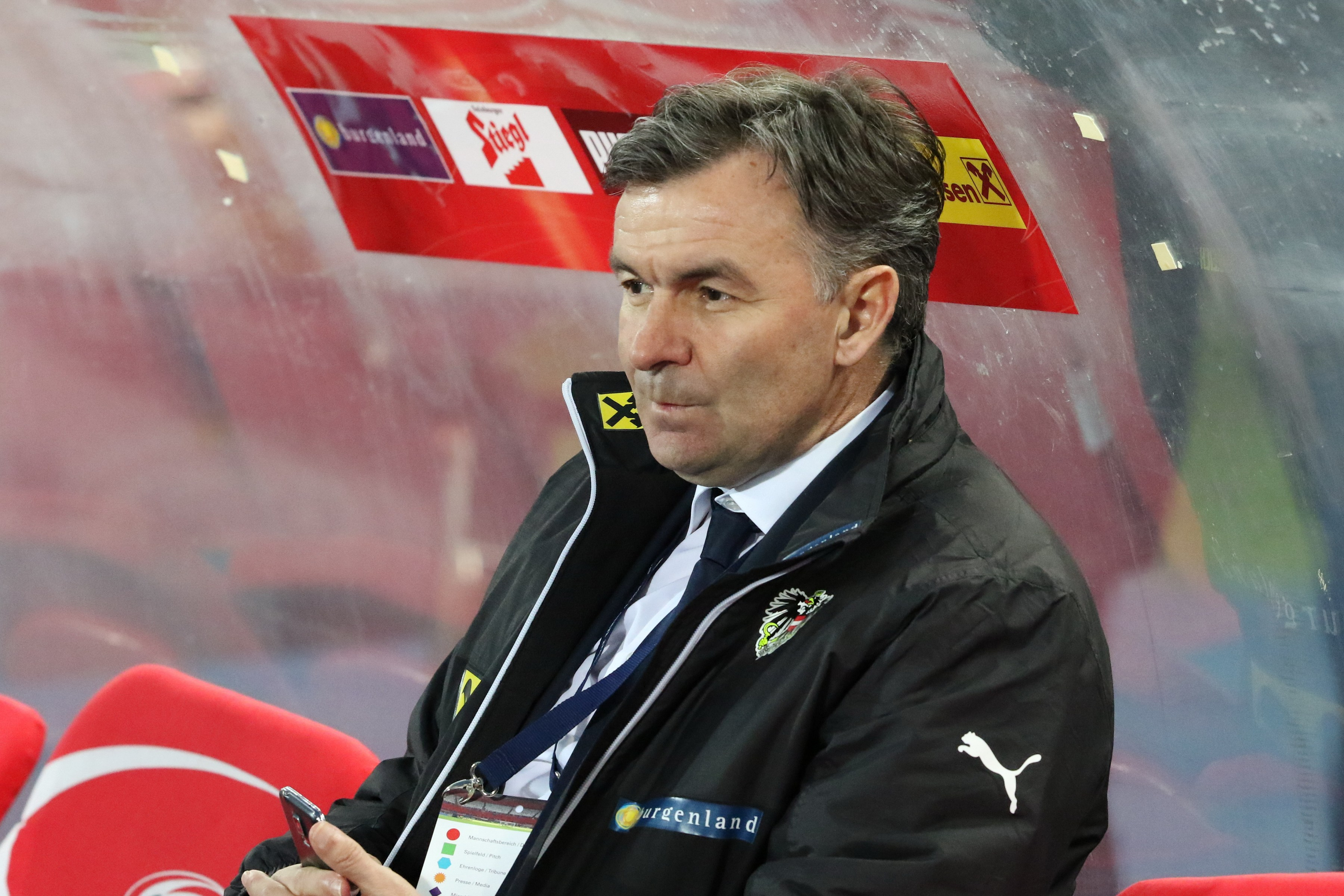
- Ruttensteiner in 2016

Personal information
- Date of birth: 12 November 1962 (age 63)
- Place of birth: Steyr, Austria

Senior career*
Years	Team	Apps	(Gls)
- Union Wolfern
- SK Amateure Steyr
- Union Vöcklamarkt
- FC Union Wels

Managerial career
- 1993–1995: ATSV Sattledt
- 1995–1996: FC Linz U18 (trainer)
- 1996–1997: FC Linz (co-trainer)
- 1997–1998: FC Linz
- 1998–1999: LASK (sports director)
- 1998–1999: Upper Austria (youth manager)
- 1999–2001: Austria Football Association (sports coordinator and U21 trainer)
- 2001–2006: Austria Football Association (sports director and U21 trainer)
- 2005, 2011: Austria (trainer)
- 2006–2018: Austria Football Association (sports director)
- 2018–2020: Israel Football Association (sports director)
- 2020–2022: Israel
- * Club domestic league appearances and goals

Willibald "Willi" Ruttensteiner (born 12 November 1962) is an Austrian businessman and football administrator and manager who served as head coach of the Israel national team as well as the head of the youth development program "Project12". Following the resignation of Dietmar Constantini in September 2011, Ruttensteiner was acting trainer of the Austria national team for two games. In the two games he managed a win and a tie.

He was also responsible for the signing of national coach Marcel Koller, who was controversial in the beginning and later very successful.

== Early life ==
Ruttensteiner was born in Steyr, Austria. He is Christian.

== Career as manager ==
- 1993 – 1995: ATSV Sattledt (Champion 1993/1994)
- 1995 – 1996: U18-trainer FC Linz (Austrian Champion)
- 1996 – 1997: Co-Trainer FC Linz (Champion under Heinz Hochhauser)
- 1997 – 1998: Head coach FC Linz
- 1998 – 1999: Sports director LASK Linz and youth manager of the Upper Austrian Football Association
- 1999 – 2001: ÖFB sports coordinator and U21-Trainer
- 2001 – 2006: ÖFB sports director and U21-Trainer
- since 2006: ÖFB sports director
- October 2005: Responsible for training the Austria national football team in the 2006 FIFA World Cup qualification games against England and Northern Ireland
- September – November 2011: Responsible for training the Austria national football team in the European Championship qualification games against Azerbaijan and Kazakhstan.
- June 2018: Israel Football Association sports director (under Israel's head coach and Austrian manager Andi Herzog)
- July 2020: Israel head coach

== Career as a player ==
- Union Wolfern
- SK Amateure Steyr
- Union Vöcklamarkt
- FC Union Wels

== Managerial Statistics ==
As of Match played 26 March 2022

Team	From	To	Record				
Team	From	To	G	W	D	L	Win %
Israel	July 2020	February 2022	20	8	3	9	40.00
