= Josef Molzer =

Austrian footballer and coach

Personal information
- Date of birth: 28 February 1906
- Date of death: September 1987
- Position: Striker

Senior career*
Years	Team	Apps	(Gls)
1922–1926	SK Admira Wien		
1926–1927	SK Rapid Wien	3	(1)
1927	FK Austria Wien		
1928–1929	Floridsdorfer AC		
1929–1936	FK Austria Wien		
1936–1938	First Vienna FC		

International career
1932	Austria	2	(1)

Managerial career
- 1946–1949: SK Sturm Graz
- 1950: SC Westfalia Herne
- 1951–1952: TSV 1860 München
- 1955: Austria
- 1956–1958: Austria
- 1960: First Vienna FC
- * Club domestic league appearances and goals

Josef Molzer (28 February 1906 – September 1987) was an Austrian international footballer and coach.
