= Hans Kaulich =

Austrian footballer, manager, and referee

Personal information
- Full name: Johann Anton Caspar Melchior Balthasar Kaulich
- Place of birth: Austria
- Position: Forward

Senior career*
Years	Team	Apps	(Gls)
1912–1913	Vienna Cricket and Football-Club		

Managerial career
- 1954–1955: Austria
- * Club domestic league appearances and goals

Johann Anton Caspar Melchior Balthasar Kaulich "Hans" Kaulich was an Austrian footballer, referee and manager.

== Career ==
Before the outbreak of World War I, Kaulich played for Vienna Cricket and Football-Club as a forward.

Following the war, Kaulich became a referee.

On 29 November 1954, Kaulich was appointed manager of the Austria national team. On 27 March 1955, Kaulich managed Austria for the only time, culminating in a 3–2 defeat against Czechoslovakia in the 1955–60 Central European International Cup. Kaulich resigned from the post the following day, citing the rebuilding effort following the 1954 FIFA World Cup to be too great.
