= List of international goals scored by Marko Arnautović =

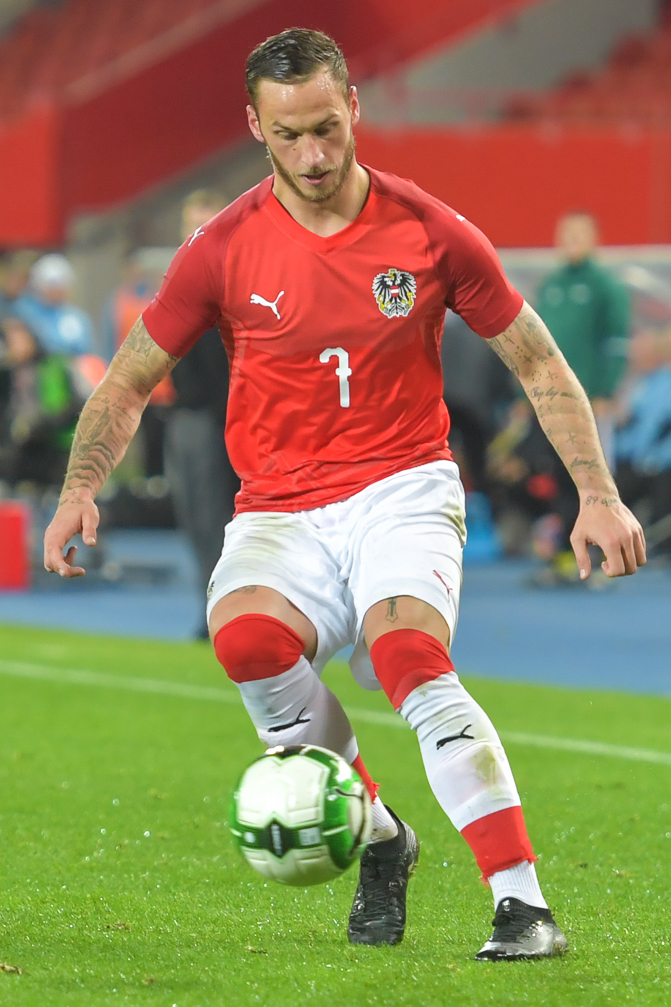
Arnautović playing for Austria in 2017

Marko Arnautović is an Austrian professional footballer who represented the Austria national team between 2008 and 2026. In total, he scored 49 goals in 137 international appearances, making him the country's top scorer, as well as their most-capped player overall.

Upon scoring against Sweden on 12 September 2023, Arnautović became Austria's second top scorer, overtaking Hans Krankl. On 9 October 2025, he surpassed Toni Polster's record of 44 goals by scoring four times against San Marino during the 2026 FIFA World Cup qualification, becoming Austria's all-time leading scorer.

== International goals ==
Scores and results list Austria's goal tally first, score column indicates score after each Arnautović goal.

List of international goals scored by Marko Arnautović
No.	Cap	Date	Venue	Opponent	Score	Result	Competition	Ref.
1	6	8 October 2010	Ernst-Happel-Stadion, Vienna, Austria	Azerbaijan	2–0	3–0	UEFA Euro 2012 qualifying	
2	6	8 October 2010	Ernst-Happel-Stadion, Vienna, Austria	Azerbaijan	3–0	3–0	UEFA Euro 2012 qualifying	
3	7	12 October 2010	King Baudouin Stadium, Brussels, Belgium	Belgium	2–1	4–4	UEFA Euro 2012 qualifying	
4	9	9 February 2011	Philips Stadion, Eindhoven, Netherlands	Netherlands	1–3	1–3	Friendly	
5	12	2 September 2011	Veltins-Arena, Gelsenkirchen, Germany	Germany	1–3	2–6	UEFA Euro 2012 qualifying	
6	18	1 June 2012	Tivoli Stadion Tirol, Innsbruck, Austria	Ukraine	2–1	3–2	Friendly	
7	18	1 June 2012	Tivoli Stadion Tirol, Innsbruck, Austria	Ukraine	3–2	3–2	Friendly	
8	41	27 March 2015	Rheinpark Stadion, Vaduz, Liechtenstein	Liechtenstein	5–0	5–0	UEFA Euro 2016 qualifying	
9	46	9 October 2015	Podgorica City Stadium, Podgorica, Montenegro	Montenegro	2–2	3–2	UEFA Euro 2016 qualifying	
10	47	12 October 2015	Ernst-Happel-Stadion, Vienna, Austria	Liechtenstein	1–0	3–0	UEFA Euro 2016 qualifying	
11	51	31 May 2016	Wörthersee Stadion, Klagenfurt, Austria	Malta	1–0	2–1	Friendly	
12	57	6 October 2016	Ernst-Happel-Stadion, Vienna, Austria	Wales	1–1	2–2	2018 FIFA World Cup qualification	
13	57	6 October 2016	Ernst-Happel-Stadion, Vienna, Austria	Wales	2–2	2–2	2018 FIFA World Cup qualification	
14	61	24 March 2017	Ernst-Happel-Stadion, Vienna, Austria	Moldova	1–0	2–0	2018 FIFA World Cup qualification	
15	62	28 March 2017	Tivoli Stadion Tirol, Innsbruck, Austria	Finland	1–0	1–1	Friendly	
16	65	6 October 2017	Ernst-Happel-Stadion, Vienna, Austria	Serbia	2–1	3–2	2018 FIFA World Cup qualification	
17	68	23 March 2018	Wörthersee Stadion, Klagenfurt, Austria	Slovenia	2–0	3–0	Friendly	
18	68	23 March 2018	Wörthersee Stadion, Klagenfurt, Austria	Slovenia	3–0	3–0	Friendly	
19	69	27 March 2018	Stade Josy Barthel, Luxembourg City, Luxembourg	Luxembourg	1–0	4–0	Friendly	
20	75	12 October 2018	Ernst-Happel-Stadion, Vienna, Austria	Northern Ireland	1–0	1–0	2018–19 UEFA Nations League B	
21	79	24 March 2019	Sammy Ofer Stadium, Haifa, Israel	Israel	1–0	2–4	UEFA Euro 2020 qualifying	
22	79	24 March 2019	Sammy Ofer Stadium, Haifa, Israel	Israel	2–4	2–4	UEFA Euro 2020 qualifying	
23	81	10 June 2019	Toše Proeski Arena, Skopje, North Macedonia	North Macedonia	2–1	4–1	UEFA Euro 2020 qualifying	
24	81	10 June 2019	Toše Proeski Arena, Skopje, North Macedonia	North Macedonia	3–1	4–1	UEFA Euro 2020 qualifying	
25	82	6 September 2019	Red Bull Arena, Salzburg, Austria	Latvia	1–0	6–0	UEFA Euro 2020 qualifying	
26	82	6 September 2019	Red Bull Arena, Salzburg, Austria	Latvia	3–0	6–0	UEFA Euro 2020 qualifying	
27	89	13 June 2021	Arena Națională, Bucharest, Romania	North Macedonia	3–1	3–1	UEFA Euro 2020	
28	92	1 September 2021	Zimbru Stadium, Chișinău, Moldova	Moldova	2–0	2–0	2022 FIFA World Cup qualification	
29	93	4 September 2021	Sammy Ofer Stadium, Haifa, Israel	Israel	2–3	2–5	2022 FIFA World Cup qualification	
30	95	12 November 2021	Wörthersee Stadion, Klagenfurt, Austria	Israel	1–1	4–2	2022 FIFA World Cup qualification	
31	96	15 November 2021	Wörthersee Stadion, Klagenfurt, Austria	Moldova	1–0	4–1	2022 FIFA World Cup qualification	
32	96	15 November 2021	Wörthersee Stadion, Klagenfurt, Austria	Moldova	3–0	4–1	2022 FIFA World Cup qualification	
33	99	3 June 2022	Gradski Vrt Stadium, Osijek, Croatia	Croatia	1–0	3–0	2022–23 UEFA Nations League A	
34	105	16 November 2022	Estadio La Rosaleda, Málaga, Spain	Andorra	1–0	1–0	Friendly	
35	110	12 September 2023	Friends Arena, Stockholm, Sweden	Sweden	2–0	3–1	UEFA Euro 2024 qualifying	
36	110	12 September 2023	Friends Arena, Stockholm, Sweden	Sweden	3–0	3–1	UEFA Euro 2024 qualifying	
37	114	21 June 2024	Olympiastadion, Berlin, Germany	Poland	3–1	3–1	UEFA Euro 2024	
38	120	13 October 2024	Raiffeisen Arena, Linz, Austria	Norway	1–0	5–1	2024–25 UEFA Nations League B	
39	120	13 October 2024	Raiffeisen Arena, Linz, Austria	Norway	2–1	5–1	2024–25 UEFA Nations League B	
40	125	10 June 2025	San Marino Stadium, Serravalle, San Marino	San Marino	1–0	4–0	2026 FIFA World Cup qualification	
41	125	10 June 2025	San Marino Stadium, Serravalle, San Marino	San Marino	3–0	4–0	2026 FIFA World Cup qualification	
42	128	9 October 2025	Ernst-Happel-Stadion, Vienna, Austria	San Marino	2–0	10–0	2026 FIFA World Cup qualification	
43	128	9 October 2025	Ernst-Happel-Stadion, Vienna, Austria	San Marino	7–0	10–0	2026 FIFA World Cup qualification	
44	128	9 October 2025	Ernst-Happel-Stadion, Vienna, Austria	San Marino	9–0	10–0	2026 FIFA World Cup qualification	
45	128	9 October 2025	Ernst-Happel-Stadion, Vienna, Austria	San Marino	10–0	10–0	2026 FIFA World Cup qualification	
46	129	15 November 2025	AEK Arena, Larnaca, Cyprus	Cyprus	1–0	2–0	2026 FIFA World Cup qualification	
47	129	15 November 2025	AEK Arena, Larnaca, Cyprus	Cyprus	2–0	2–0	2026 FIFA World Cup qualification	
48	134	16 June 2026	Levi's Stadium, Santa Clara, United States	Jordan	3–1	3–1	2026 FIFA World Cup	
49	136	27 June 2026	Arrowhead Stadium, Kansas City, United States	Algeria	1–0	3–3	2026 FIFA World Cup	

== Statistics ==
Appearances and goals by national team and year
National team	Year	Apps	Goals
Austria	2008	3	0
Austria	2009	2	0
Austria	2010	3	3
Austria	2011	8	2
Austria	2012	7	2
Austria	2013	9	0
Austria	2014	8	0
Austria	2015	8	3
Austria	2016	12	3
Austria	2017	7	3
Austria	2018	10	4
Austria	2019	8	6
Austria	2020	2	0
Austria	2021	9	6
Austria	2022	10	2
Austria	2023	5	2
Austria	2024	10	3
Austria	2025	9	8
Austria	2026	7	2
Total		137	49

Goals by competition
Competition	Goals
FIFA World Cup qualification	17
UEFA European Championship qualifying	15
Friendlies	9
UEFA Nations League	4
UEFA European Championship	2
FIFA World Cup	2
Total	49

Goals by opponent
Opponent	Goals
San Marino	6
Israel	4
Moldova	4
North Macedonia	3
Azerbaijan	2
Cyprus	2
Latvia	2
Liechtenstein	2
Luxembourg	2
Norway	2
Slovenia	2
Sweden	2
Ukraine	2
Wales	2
Algeria	1
Andorra	1
Belgium	1
Croatia	1
Finland	1
Germany	1
Jordan	1
Malta	1
Montenegro	1
Netherlands	1
Northern Ireland	1
Poland	1
Serbia	1
Total	49
