= Marko Arnautović =

Austrian footballer (born 1989)

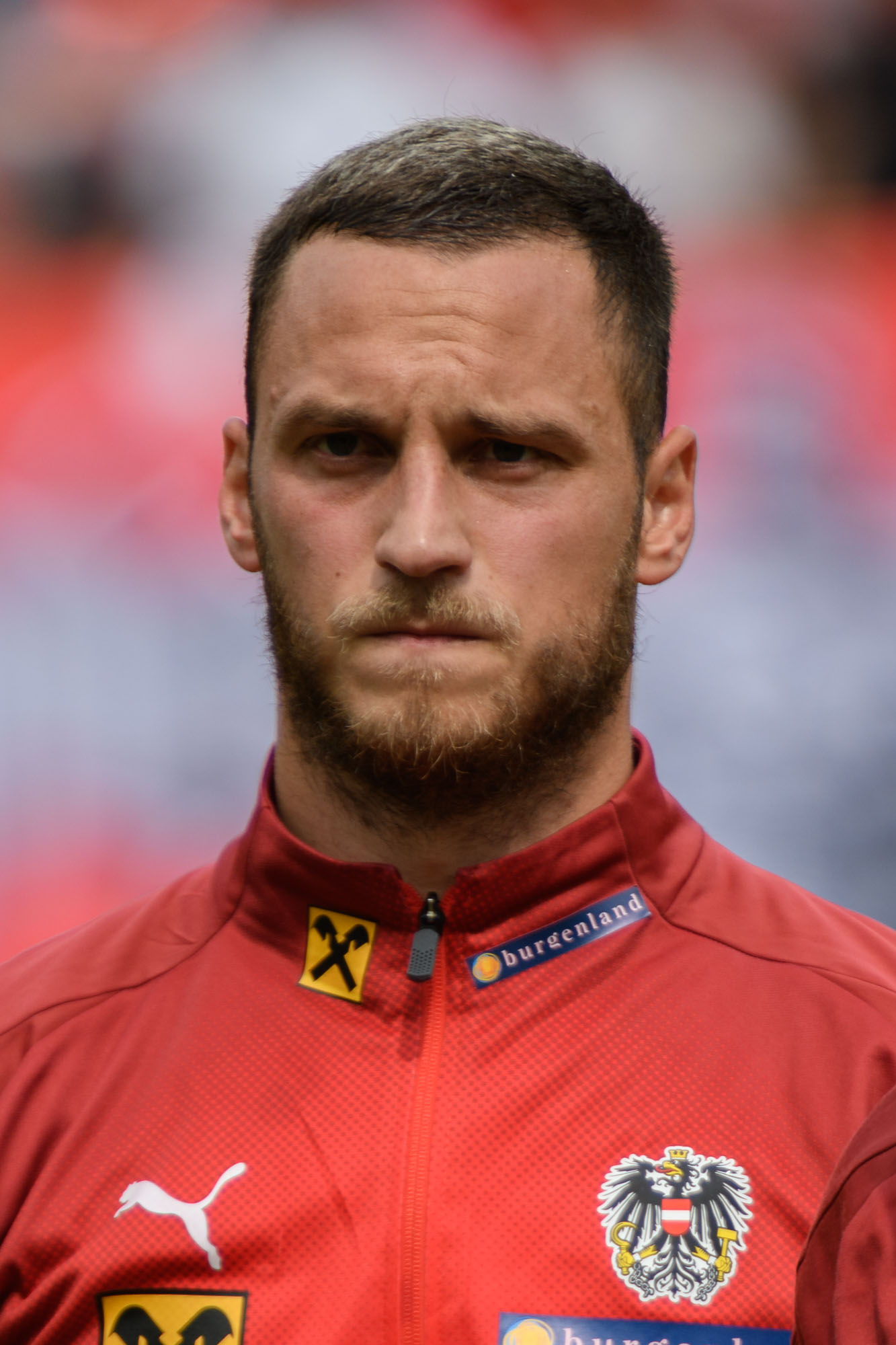
- Arnautović with Austria in 2018

Personal information
- Full name: Marko Arnautović
- Date of birth: 19 April 1989 (age 37)
- Place of birth: Vienna, Austria
- Height: 1.92 m (6 ft 4 in)
- Position: Striker

Team information
- Current team: Red Star Belgrade
- Number: 7

Youth career
- 1995–1998: Floridsdorfer AC
- 1998–2001: Austria Wien
- 2001–2002: First Vienna FC
- 2002–2003: Austria Wien
- 2003–2004: Rapid Wien
- 2004–2006: Floridsdorfer AC
- 2006–2007: Jong Twente

Senior career*
| Years | Team | Apps | (Gls) |
| 2007–2010 | Twente | 44 | (12) |
| 2009–2010 | → Inter Milan (loan) | 3 | (0) |
| 2010–2013 | Werder Bremen | 72 | (14) |
| 2013–2017 | Stoke City | 125 | (22) |
| 2017–2019 | West Ham United | 59 | (21) |
| 2019–2021 | Shanghai SIPG | 33 | (19) |
| 2021–2024 | Bologna | 54 | (24) |
| 2023–2024 | → Inter Milan (loan) | 27 | (5) |
| 2024–2025 | Inter Milan | 18 | (4) |
| 2025– | Red Star Belgrade | 25 | (10) |

International career
| 2007 | Austria U19 | 4 | (0) |
| 2007–2010 | Austria U21 | 5 | (3) |
| 2008–2026 | Austria | 137 | (49) |
- * Club domestic league appearances and goals as of 20:00, 8 November 2026 (UTC)

Marko Arnautović (Serbian Cyrillic: Марко Арнаутовић; born 19 April 1989) is an Austrian professional footballer who plays as a striker for Serbian SuperLiga club Red Star Belgrade.

Arnautović began his career in his native country Austria, playing in the youth teams for a number of clubs in the Vienna area before he signed a contract with Dutch club Twente in 2006. He impressed at De Grolsch Veste and after a fine 2008–09 season he joined Italian giants Inter Milan on loan, where he made only three appearances due to injury. He joined German side Werder Bremen in June 2010 and became a regular member of the first-team. In September 2013, Arnautović joined English side Stoke City, where he scored 26 goals in 145 appearances. He joined West Ham United in July 2017 for a fee of £20 million and won the Hammer of the Year award in his debut season. He scored 22 goals in 65 games for West Ham over two seasons before joining Shanghai SIPG (now Shanghai Port) for £22.4 million in July 2019. Arnautović returned to Europe to join Italian club Bologna in August 2021. In 2023, he rejoined Inter Milan on loan for the 2023–24 season, where he contributed mainly as a rotational forward in their domestic success and European campaign. His move was made permanent ahead of the following season, before he later joined Serbian club Red Star Belgrade in 2025.

A full international with 137 caps for Austria between 2008 and 2026, Arnautović is the most-capped and highest-scoring player in the history of the country's national team. He was part of the sides that qualified for the UEFA European Championship in 2016, 2020, and 2024, and the FIFA World Cup in 2026. He was named Austrian Footballer of the Year in 2018.

== Early and personal life ==
Marko Arnautović was born on 19 April 1989 in Vienna, to a Serbian father and an Austrian mother. Arnautović is a Serbian Orthodox Christian. He is married to Sarah (née Lizakowski), and together they have two daughters, Emilia and Alicia. During his time spent in Italy and Germany, Arnautović developed a reputation with the media as "the bad boy of Austrian football". Speaking on the matter in October 2013, he admitted he was "not an angel" but insisted that the birth of his daughter had made him "grow up".

== Club career ==
=== Early career ===
Arnautović began his career with his brother Danijel at Floridsdorfer AC. In 1998, he joined FK Austria Wien but behaviour issues saw him change clubs regularly as in the next six years he played for First Vienna FC 1894, a second spell at FK Austria Wien, and SK Rapid Wien before he returned to Floridsdorfer AC. Despite this he was scouted by Dutch club FC Twente who signed him in 2006.

=== Twente ===
Arnautović scored 22 goals in 24 matches for the Under-19 FC Twente in the 2007–08 season, helping them win the youth championship. He then played for Jong FC Twente between 2006 and 2008, appearing in 32 matches and scoring 27 goals. Arnautović made his professional debut for FC Twente in the 2006–07 season as a substitute for Kennedy Bakircioglu against PSV Eindhoven in April 2007. In July 2008, he extended his contract with Twente despite interest from Dutch giant Feyenoord.

He made 16 appearances in 2007–08 as Twente finished in fourth position and qualified for the UEFA Champions League. In the 2008–09 season Arnautović scored 14 goals in 41 matches as Twente finished 2nd in the Eredivisie and reached the knock out phase of the UEFA Cup. In March 2009 after a league match against Willem II, one of Twente opponents, Ibrahim Kargbo, accused Arnautović of racially abusing him. An investigation by the Dutch Football Association found no evidence against him, and the case was dismissed.

==== Loan to Inter Milan ====
On 4 August 2009, it was said that Arnautović was on the verge of a move to Italian giants Inter Milan. The deal had been largely held up due to a stress fracture in Arnautović's right foot, leading to a re-negotiation of the deal between the clubs. On 6 August, it was announced by Twente that the details for the loan had been finalised, Arnautović would join Inter on loan for the season. The deal was said to become permanent if he was to play a set number of matches. If the deal did not become permanent the player would return to Twente on a pre-agreed contract of two years, with an option to extend the contract for a third year. He made his unofficial debut for Inter in a friendly match on 5 September 2009 against Swiss team, Lugano, the final score was 3–3.

He made his league debut in a 1–0 away victory against Chievo on 6 January 2010. He played in their next match against Siena coming on as a substitute at half time for the injured Dejan Stanković and helped Inter to win the match 4–3. He played one more match for Inter against Atalanta on 24 April 2010. At the end of the season Inter decided against turning his loan into a permanent move with manager José Mourinho stating that Arnautović "is a fantastic person but has the attitude of a child".

=== Werder Bremen ===
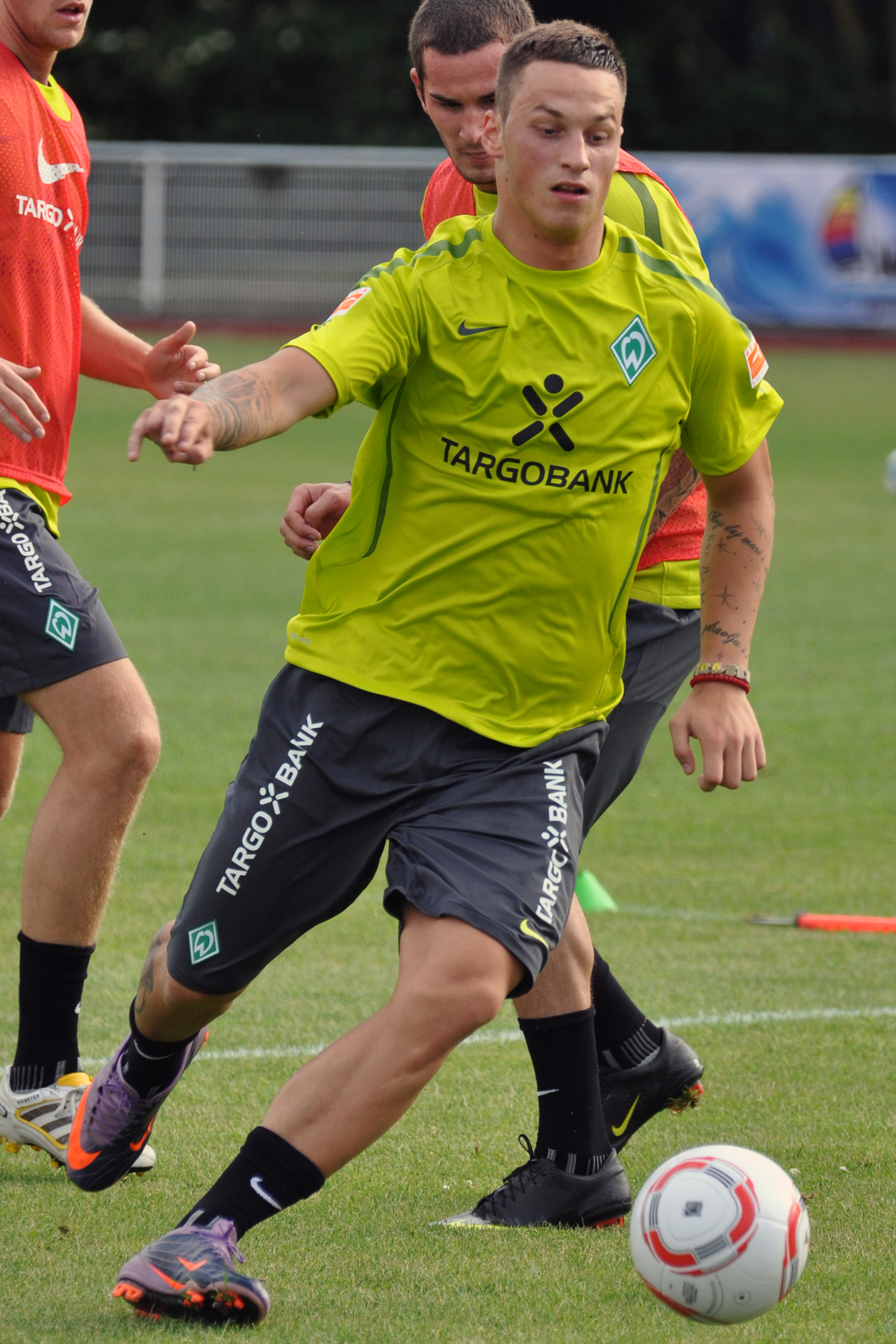
Arnautović training with Werder Bremen in 2010

On 4 June 2010, Bundesliga club Werder Bremen confirmed that they had signed Arnautović from Twente on a four-year deal. Before he had played a match for Bremen he irked their captain Torsten Frings who branded him as "arrogant". He made his Bundesliga debut on 21 August 2010 in a 4–1 defeat against Hoffenheim. Arnautović scored twice against 1. FC Köln on 28 August 2010, his first goals for Bremen. He ended the 2010–11 season at the Weserstadion with five goals in 34 appearances as Bremen finished in 13th position and he also played in the Champions League, scoring two goals in the competition against his former clubs, Twente and Inter Milano. In 2011–12, he scored six goals in 20 appearances as Bremen finished in ninth position in the Bundesliga. In March 2012, he was ruled out for two months with a knee ligament injury he suffered whilst playing with his dog.

In 2012–13, Arnautović played in 27 matches and scored five goals which included a hat-trick on 2 December 2012 away at Hoffenheim, including an impressive free kick, as Bremen won 4–1. In April 2013, Arnautović and his Bremen teammate Eljero Elia were caught speeding and were both suspended by the club.

=== Stoke City ===
On 2 September 2013, Arnautović joined Premier League side Stoke City on a four-year contract for a fee of £2 million. He was assigned the number 10 shirt by manager Mark Hughes who also described his signing as a coup—"People will very quickly see what an outstanding talent he is. In terms of his power and his pace, which is something I think we need in the squad, he ticks all the boxes. Technically he's excellent and I'm really looking forward to working with him. I think it's quite a coup to get him here. It made sense to us and made sense to him that this is the right club for him. He's got a real desire to make an impression." Arnautović made his Stoke debut twelve days later in a 0–0 draw against Manchester City at the Britannia Stadium. After spending a month at the club, manager Hughes stated that Arnautović had adapted well to English football after being given a free-role in the side. On 26 October, he scored his first goal for Stoke, a 25-yard free-kick in a 3–2 defeat against Manchester United. Arnautović ended his first season in England with five goals in 35 appearances, and the team finished in ninth position in the Premier League.

After making little impact in the first few matches of the 2014–15 season, Arnautović lost his place in the side. He regained his form towards the end of the campaign and returned to a regular place. He scored once in 29 league appearances over the campaign: a 95th-minute equaliser against West Ham United on 11 April 2015, having earlier in the match had two goals disallowed for offside. He played 35 times in 2014–15 season as Stoke finished in ninth position.

Arnautović's first appearance of the 2015–16 season came in a 2–2 draw with Tottenham Hotspur at White Hart Lane on 15 August, scoring the team's first goal as they came back from 2–0 down. He scored the only goal of Stoke's victory over champions Chelsea on 7 November, and both goals against Manchester City on 5 December in a 2–0 home victory. On 28 December, Arnautović won a last-minute penalty kick against Everton at Goodison Park when he was fouled by John Stones, and sent it past goalkeeper Tim Howard to win the match 4–3. He scored the only goal of the League Cup semi-final second leg against Liverpool on 26 January 2016, forcing a penalty shootout which his team eventually lost. Arnautović went on to play 40 times for Stoke in 2015–16, finishing as the top scorer with 12 goals as the Potters again finished in ninth position.

Arnautović signed a new four-year contract with Stoke in July 2016, keeping him contracted with the Potters until the summer of 2020. Arnautović made 35 appearances in 2016–17, as Stoke finished in 13th position. He scored seven goals including braces against Sunderland and Middlesbrough.

Arnautović's future at Stoke was cast in doubt prior to the start of the 2017–18 season after he submitted a transfer request.

=== West Ham United ===
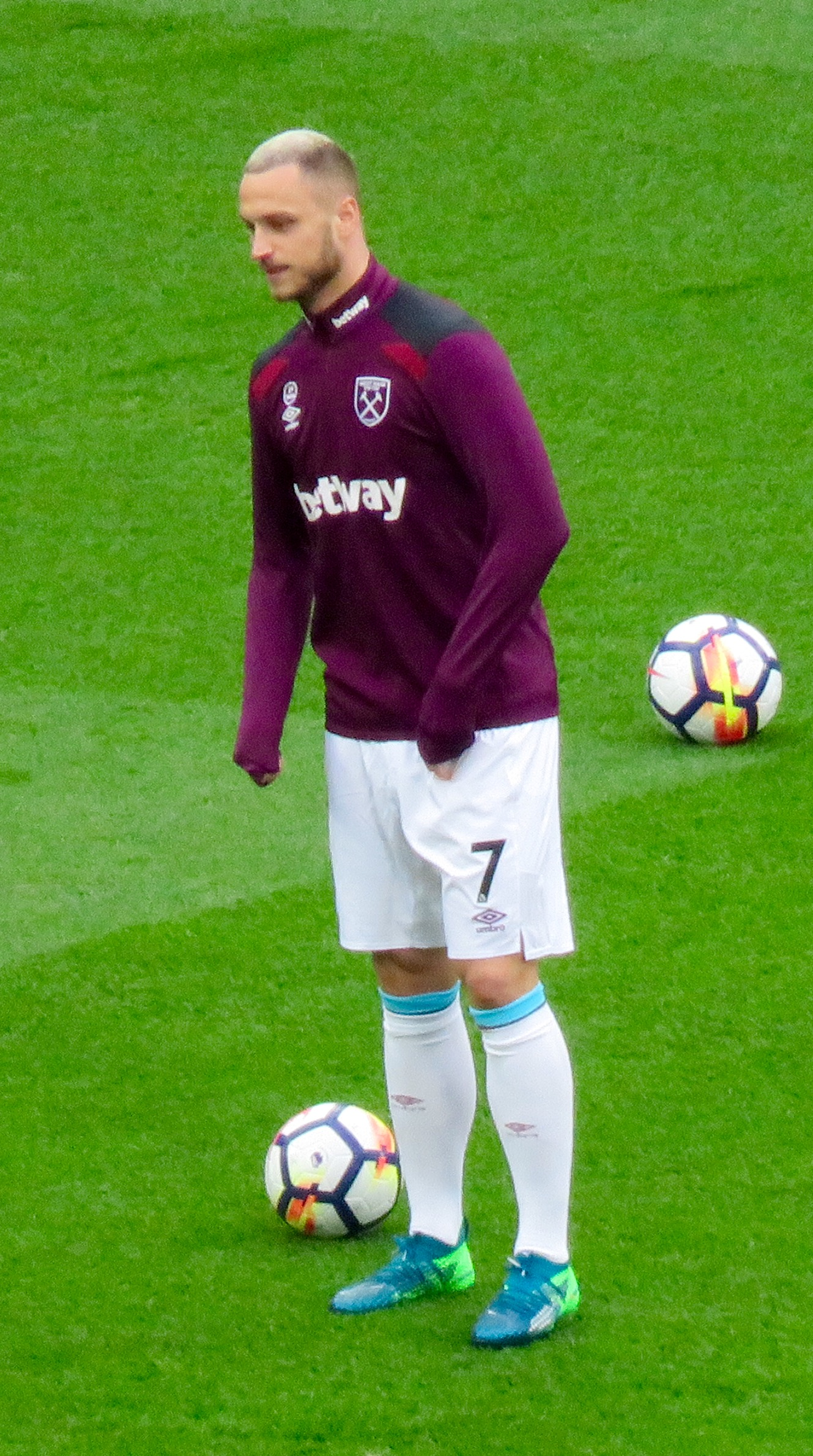
Arnautović training with West Ham United in 2018

On 22 July 2017, Arnautović signed for fellow Premier League team West Ham United on a five-year contract for a club record £20 million fee, which could rise to £25 million with add-ons.

He made his debut on 13 August, playing the full 90 minutes of a 4–0 loss to Manchester United at Old Trafford. In his next game six days later, he was sent off after 33 minutes for elbowing Southampton's Jack Stephens in a 3–2 away loss.

In November, new manager David Moyes said that Arnautović had to work harder and be more of a team player or be dropped. He scored his first goal for the club on 9 December, the only one of a win over reigning champions Chelsea at the London Stadium, in what was Moyes' first victory as West Ham manager. He followed this with a goal in his first return to the Bet365 Stadium in a 0–3 win against Stoke City on 16 December. Following his conversion from a winger to a centre-forward at West Ham, Arnautović scored 11 Premier League goals in his first season at the club; his goal against Everton on the final day of the campaign making him the first West Ham player to reach that figure since Bobby Zamora in 2006–07. In April 2018, he was named as Hammer of the Year for the 2017–18 season.

In January 2019, he was the subject of a £35 million transfer offer from a Chinese club, believed to be Shanghai SIPG, which his agent and brother, Danijel, said Arnautović wanted West Ham to accept. Despite this, on 26 January, Arnautović committed himself to West Ham by signing a contract extension of unspecified length. He also received a 20% increase raising his weekly wage to £120,000. A £40 million release clause was also added to his contract. Arnautović finished the 2018–19 season as West Ham's leading goal scorer, with 11 goals. In July 2019, West Ham rejected an offer of £19.7 million from a Chinese club as Arnautović said he wanted to leave.

=== Shanghai Port ===
On 7 July 2019, Arnautović signed for Shanghai SIPG (later rebranded as Shanghai Port) for a fee of £22.4 million. He scored on his debut two weeks later, a 2–2 draw at Chongqing Dangdai Lifan in the Chinese Super League.

=== Bologna ===
On 1 August 2021, Arnautović signed a two-year deal with Serie A side Bologna. On 15 August, Arnautović made his debut for Bologna, in a 5–4 defeat against Ternana in the first round of the Coppa Italia, scoring a goal in the 56th minute.

==== Second loan to Inter Milan ====
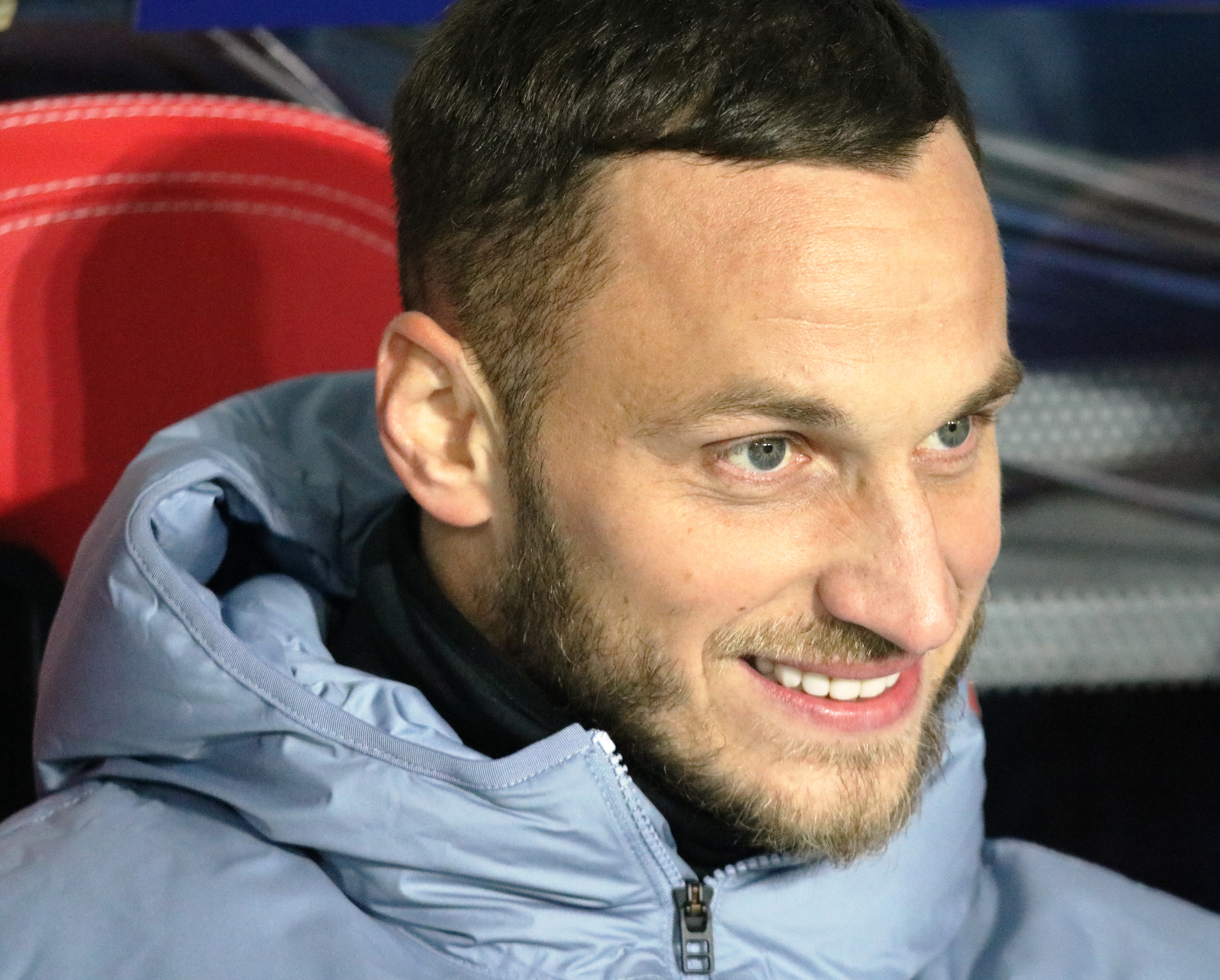
Arnautovic in 2023

On 16 August 2023, Arnautović for the second time in his career joined Inter Milan on loan, returning to the club after 13 years. He chose 8 as his shirt number, alluding to Zlatan Ibrahimović, who wore this number from 2006 to 2009 while playing for the club. On 29 November, he netted his first Champions League goal with Inter in a 3–3 away draw with Benfica, which was the longest time any player had scored since previously scoring in the competition, after 12 years and 357 days from his last goal in 2010. On 20 February 2024, he scored the only goal in a 1–0 victory over Atlético Madrid in the first leg of the Champions League round of 16.

=== Permanent move to Inter ===
Arnautovic made a permanent move to Inter in the 2024–25 season. During the 2024–25 season, Marko Arnautović featured primarily as a backup striker for Inter Milan, making 18 Serie A appearances and scoring 4 goals with 2 assists in 542 minutes of play. Across all competitions, he contributed 9 goals and 1 assist in 896 minutes, averaging a goal contribution every 76 minutes. Despite limited starts behind Lautaro Martínez and Marcus Thuram, Arnautović delivered decisive performances, including a goal and an assist in a league win over Cagliari and a volleyed strike in the Coppa Italia quarter-final against Lazio. While occasionally criticized for missed chances, such as in the UEFA Champions League match against Monaco, his physical presence, experience, and efficiency off the bench were praised by Italian media and former players like Alessandro Altobelli, solidifying his role as a reliable impact player throughout the season.

=== Red Star Belgrade ===
In July 2025, Arnautović signed a two-year contract with Red Star Belgrade. Arnautovic revealed in the press conference which unveiled his signing that the transfer fulfilled a promise to his Bologna manager and friend, Siniša Mihajlović. Mihajlović won the 1991 European Cup Final and Intercontinental Cup while at Red Star, and died of leukaemia in 2022.

== International career ==
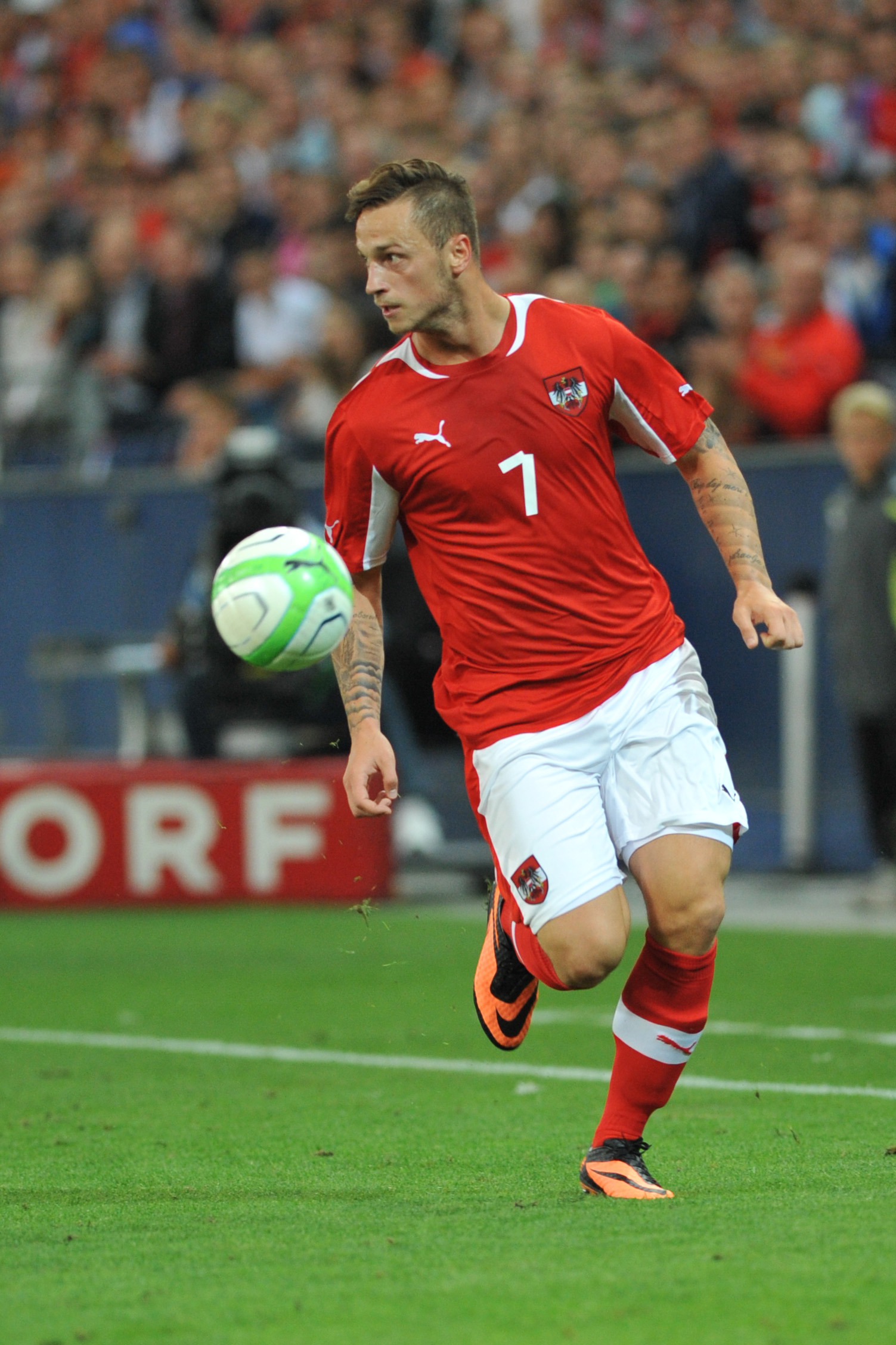
Arnautović playing for Austria in 2013

=== Youth ===
Arnautović played with the Austrian under-19 side in the 2007 UEFA European Under-19 Championship where he was sent-off in their second match and failed to make it out of the group stage. He made four appearances in total at under-19 level. He scored three goals in five matches for the Austria under-21 team. After scoring a free-kick in an under-21 game against Denmark in March 2010, Arnautović earned praise from manager Andreas Herzog who described him as the best Austrian footballer of the last 30 years.

=== Senior ===
Arnautović played his first match for the Austria national senior team on 11 October 2008, against the Faroe Islands. He scored his first goals for Austria in a 3–0 win over Azerbaijan on 8 October 2010.

Arnautović started in all ten of Austria's matches during their successful UEFA Euro 2016 qualifying campaign, scoring in a win over Montenegro and both fixtures against neighbours Liechtenstein. On 31 May 2016, he was selected in the Austrian squad for the UEFA Euro 2016.

Arnautović started all but one of Austria's qualification matches for the 2018 FIFA World Cup, only missing the game against the Republic of Ireland through suspension. He scored four goals in the 10 games, but Austria's fourth-place finish would not be enough for qualification.

On 24 May 2021, Arnautović was called up for the delayed UEFA Euro 2020. On 13 June, he scored the third goal for Austria during their first game of Group C against North Macedonia. During the goal celebration, he was accused of using racist slurs against Ezgjan Alioski and Egzon Bejtulai from the rival team, who are both Macedonian Albanians. Afterwards, he apologized for his words but denied his language was racist. UEFA later announced an investigation into Arnautović's actions. He was banned by UEFA for one game for "insulting another player", resulting in him missing Austria's next game in Euro 2020 against the Netherlands. UEFA did not find the language to be discriminatory, however.

On 6 June 2022, Arnautović played his 100th match for Austria in a 2–1 defeat against Denmark in the 2022–23 UEFA Nations League A. Later that year, on 25 September, he became the most-capped Austrian player with 104 caps, breaking the previous record of Andreas Herzog, in a 3–1 home defeat against Croatia during the same tournament.

On 7 June 2024, Arnautović was named in the 26-man squad for the UEFA Euro 2024. On 21 June, he scored a penalty, captaining his team in a 3–1 victory over Poland. On 9 October 2025, he scored four goals in a 10–0 victory over San Marino during 2026 FIFA World Cup qualification, becoming Austria's all-time leading scorer with 45 goals, surpassing the previous record held by Toni Polster.

On 18 May 2026, Arnautović was selected in Ralf Rangnick's 26-man squad for the 2026 FIFA World Cup, marking Austria's first appearance in the tournament since 1998. On 16 June, he scored his first World Cup goal on his tournament debut, converting a stoppage-time penalty in a 3–1 victory over Jordan. In addition, he became the oldest Austrian player to feature at a World Cup at 37 years and 59 days, surpassing the previous record held by Michael Konsel. Arnautović then scored a second World Cup goal on 27 June, netting the opener in a 3–3 draw with Algeria. Following Austria's 3–0 defeat to Spain in the round of 32 on 2 July, Arnautović retired from the national team at the age of 37, concluding his international career with 49 goals in 137 appearances across 18 years.

== Style of play ==
Possessing a powerful physique and good technique, Arnautović is known for his ability to hold up the ball with his back to goal and bring his teammates into play with his link-up play. Despite his size, he also possesses significant pace and stamina, and is known for his ability to exploit spaces with his runs or run at opponents with the ball, while his height helps him to win aerial challenges. A versatile forward, Arnautović has played in several offensive positions: for the majority of his career, he served as a winger; however, during the 2017–18 season, his West Ham manager David Moyes made the decision to transition the Austrian effectively into a striker or a centre-forward, in order to utilise his physical and technical abilities in central areas of the pitch. Despite his playing ability, however, he was also a temperamental player, who was involved in several controversial incidents throughout his career. His skills and playing style have led him to be compared to Swedish striker Zlatan Ibrahimović in the media.

== Career statistics ==
=== Club ===
As of match played 8 November 2026

Appearances and goals by club, season and competition
| Club | Season | League | | | National cup (Note: Includes KNVB Cup, DFB-Pokal, FA Cup, Chinese FA Cup, Coppa Italia) | | League cup (Note: Includes EFL Cup) | | Continental | | Other | | Total | |
| Club | Season | Division | Apps | Goals | Apps | Goals | Apps | Goals | Apps | Goals | Apps | Goals | Apps | Goals |
|---|---|---|---|---|---|---|---|---|---|---|---|---|---|---|
| Twente | 2006–07 | Eredivisie | 2 | 0 | 0 | 0 | — | | 0 | 0 | 0 | 0 | 2 | 0 |
| Twente | 2007–08 | Eredivisie | 14 | 0 | 0 | 0 | — | | 1 (Note: Appearance in UEFA Cup) | 0 | 1 (Note: Appearance in Eredivisie European play-offs) | 0 | 16 | 0 |
| Twente | 2008–09 | Eredivisie | 28 | 12 | 5 | 1 | — | | 8 (Note: One appearance in UEFA Champions League, seven appearances and one goal in UEFA Cup) | 1 | — | | 41 | 14 |
| Twente | Total | | 44 | 12 | 5 | 1 | — | | 9 | 1 | 1 | 0 | 59 | 14 |
| Inter Milan (loan) | 2009–10 | Serie A | 3 | 0 | 0 | 0 | — | | 0 | 0 | — | | 3 | 0 |
| Werder Bremen | 2010–11 | Bundesliga | 25 | 3 | 2 | 0 | — | | 7 (Note: Appearances in UEFA Champions League) | 2 | — | | 34 | 5 |
| Werder Bremen | 2011–12 | Bundesliga | 19 | 6 | 1 | 0 | — | | — | | — | | 20 | 6 |
| Werder Bremen | 2012–13 | Bundesliga | 26 | 5 | 1 | 0 | — | | — | | — | | 27 | 5 |
| Werder Bremen | 2013–14 | Bundesliga | 2 | 0 | 1 | 0 | — | | — | | — | | 3 | 0 |
| Werder Bremen | Total | | 72 | 14 | 5 | 0 | — | | 7 | 2 | — | | 84 | 16 |
| Stoke City | 2013–14 | Premier League | 30 | 4 | 2 | 0 | 3 | 1 | — | | — | | 35 | 5 |
| Stoke City | 2014–15 | Premier League | 29 | 1 | 3 | 1 | 3 | 0 | — | | — | | 35 | 2 |
| Stoke City | 2015–16 | Premier League | 34 | 11 | 0 | 0 | 6 | 1 | — | | — | | 40 | 12 |
| Stoke City | 2016–17 | Premier League | 32 | 6 | 1 | 0 | 2 | 1 | — | | — | | 35 | 7 |
| Stoke City | Total | | 125 | 22 | 6 | 1 | 14 | 3 | — | | — | | 145 | 26 |
| West Ham United | 2017–18 | Premier League | 31 | 11 | 1 | 0 | 3 | 0 | — | | — | | 35 | 11 |
| West Ham United | 2018–19 | Premier League | 28 | 10 | 1 | 1 | 1 | 0 | — | | — | | 30 | 11 |
| West Ham United | Total | | 59 | 21 | 2 | 1 | 4 | 0 | — | | — | | 65 | 22 |
| Shanghai Port | 2019 | Chinese Super League | 11 | 9 | 2 | 0 | — | | 2 (Note: Appearance(s) in AFC Champions League) | 0 | — | | 15 | 9 |
| Shanghai Port | 2020 | Chinese Super League | 18 | 7 | 1 | 0 | — | | 1 | 1 | — | | 20 | 8 |
| Shanghai Port | 2021 | Chinese Super League | 4 | 3 | 0 | 0 | — | | 0 | 0 | — | | 4 | 3 |
| Shanghai Port | Total | | 33 | 19 | 3 | 0 | — | | 3 | 1 | — | | 39 | 20 |
| Bologna | 2021–22 | Serie A | 33 | 14 | 1 | 1 | — | | — | | — | | 34 | 15 |
| Bologna | 2022–23 | Serie A | 21 | 10 | 2 | 0 | — | | — | | — | | 23 | 10 |
| Bologna | 2023–24 | Serie A | 0 | 0 | 1 | 0 | — | | — | | — | | 1 | 0 |
| Bologna | Total | | 54 | 24 | 4 | 1 | — | | — | | — | | 58 | 25 |
| Inter Milan (loan) | 2023–24 | Serie A | 27 | 5 | 1 | 0 | — | | 4 | 2 | 2 (Note: Appearances in Supercoppa Italiana) | 0 | 34 | 7 |
| Inter Milan | 2024–25 | Serie A | 18 | 4 | 3 | 2 | — | | 7 | 1 | 0 | 0 | 28 | 7 |
| Inter Milan | Total | | 45 | 9 | 4 | 2 | — | | 11 | 3 | 2 | 0 | 62 | 14 |
| Red Star Belgrade | 2025–26 | Serbian SuperLiga | 16 | 7 | 3 | 1 | — | | 13 (Note: Three appearances in UEFA Champions League, ten appearances and two goals in UEFA Europa League) | 2 | — | | 32 | 10 |
| Red Star Belgrade | 2026–27 | Serbian SuperLiga | 9 | 3 | 1 | 2 | — | | 7 (Note: Four appearances and two goals in UEFA Champions League, two appearances in UEFA Europa League, one appearance in UEFA Conference League) | 2 | — | | 17 | 6 |
| Red Star Belgrade | Total | | 25 | 10 | 4 | 3 | — | | 20 | 4 | — | | 49 | 16 |
| Career total | | | 460 | 131 | 33 | 9 | 18 | 3 | 50 | 11 | 3 | 0 | 564 | 153 |

=== International ===
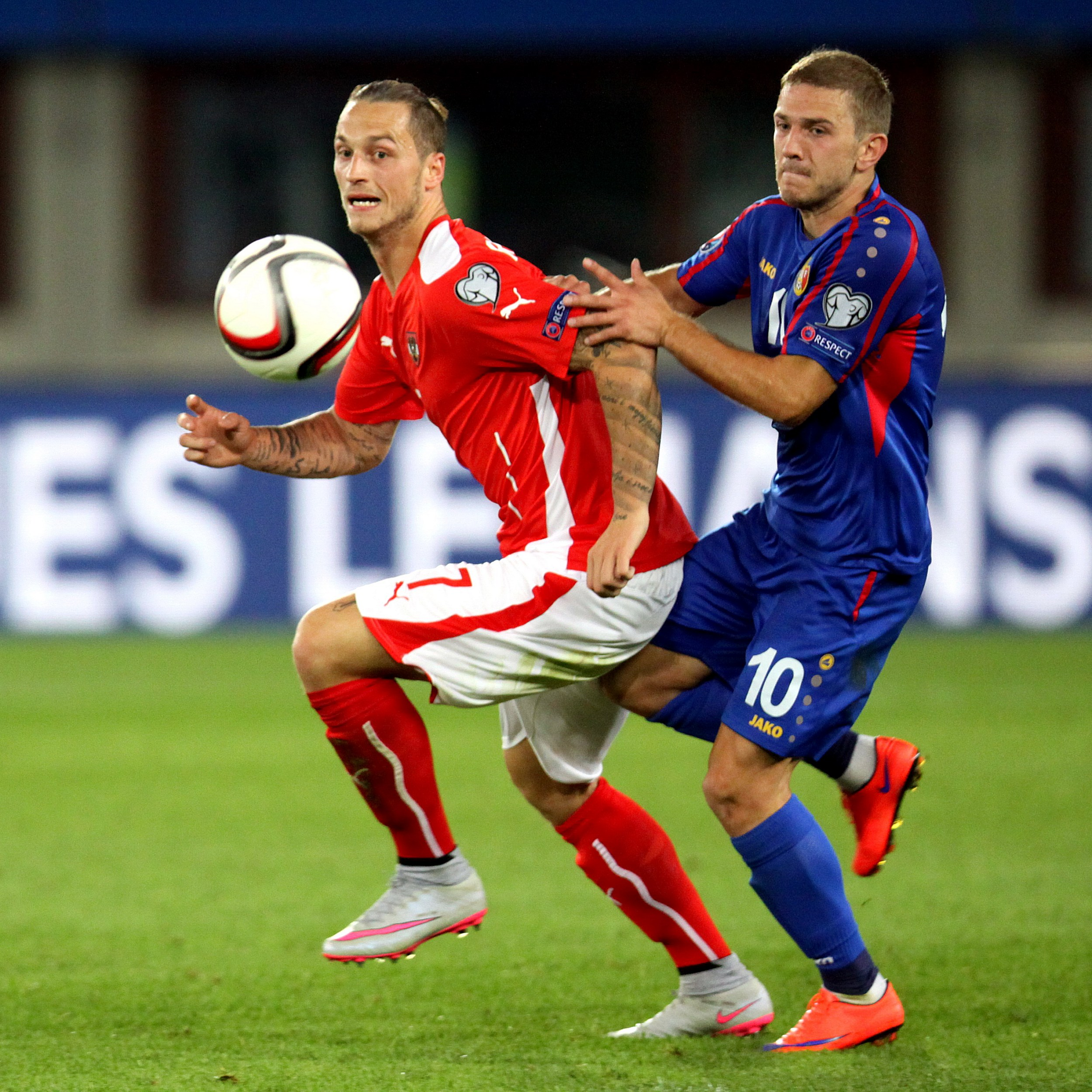
Arnautović (left) competing over the ball against Alexandru Dedov of Moldova in September 2015 during a Euro 2016 qualifier.

Appearances and goals by national team and year
| National team | Year | Apps | Goals |
|---|---|---|---|
| Austria | 2008 | 3 | 0 |
| Austria | 2009 | 2 | 0 |
| Austria | 2010 | 3 | 3 |
| Austria | 2011 | 8 | 2 |
| Austria | 2012 | 7 | 2 |
| Austria | 2013 | 9 | 0 |
| Austria | 2014 | 8 | 0 |
| Austria | 2015 | 8 | 3 |
| Austria | 2016 | 12 | 3 |
| Austria | 2017 | 7 | 3 |
| Austria | 2018 | 10 | 4 |
| Austria | 2019 | 8 | 6 |
| Austria | 2020 | 2 | 0 |
| Austria | 2021 | 9 | 6 |
| Austria | 2022 | 10 | 2 |
| Austria | 2023 | 5 | 2 |
| Austria | 2024 | 10 | 3 |
| Austria | 2025 | 9 | 8 |
| Austria | 2026 | 7 | 2 |
| Total | | 137 | 49 |

== Honours ==
Inter Milan

- Serie A: 2009–10, 2023–24
- Coppa Italia: 2009–10
- Supercoppa Italiana: 2023
- UEFA Champions League: 2009–10

Red Star Belgrade

- Serbian SuperLiga: 2025–26
- Serbian Cup: 2025–26

Individual

- West Ham United Hammer of the Year: 2017–18
- Austrian Footballer of the Year: 2018

== See also ==
- List of men's footballers with 100 or more international caps
