= Austria national football team =

Men's national association football team representing Austria

Austria
- Nickname(s): Das Team (The Team); Burschen (The Boys); Unsere Burschen (Our Boys)
- Association: Österreichischer Fußball-Bund (ÖFB)
- Confederation: UEFA (Europe)
- Head coach: Ralf Rangnick
- Captain: David Alaba
- Most caps: Marko Arnautović (137)
- Top scorer: Marko Arnautović (49)
- Home stadium: Various
- FIFA code: AUT
First colours	Second colours	Third colours

FIFA ranking
- Current: 22 (18 November 2026)
- Highest: 10 (March–June 2016)
- Lowest: 105 (July 2008)

First international
- Austria 5–0 Hungary (Vienna, Austria; 12 October 1902)

Biggest win
- Austria 10–0 San Marino (Vienna, Austria; 9 October 2025)

Biggest defeat
- Austria 1–11 England (Vienna, Austria; 8 June 1908)

World Cup
- Appearances: 8 (first in 1934)
- Best result: Third place (1954)

European Championship
- Appearances: 4 (first in 2008)
- Best result: Round of 16 (2020, 2024)
Medal record
Men's football
FIFA World Cup
Bronze medal – third place	1954 Switzerland	Team
Olympic Games (Note: After 1988, the tournament was restricted to squads with no more than three players over the age of 23, and these matches are not regarded as part of the national team's records, nor are caps awarded.)
Silver medal – second place	1936 Nazi Germany	Team
Central European International Cup
Gold medal – first place	1931–32	Team
Silver medal – second place	1927–30	Team
Silver medal – second place	1933–35	Team
Bronze medal – third place	1948–53	Team
Bronze medal – third place	1955–60	Team
- Website: oefb.at

The Austria national football team (German: Österreichische Fußballnationalmannschaft) represents Austria in men's international football competitions, and is controlled by the Austrian Football Association.

The Austrian Football Association (ÖFB) was founded on 18 March 1904, in the Austro-Hungarian Empire. During the 1930s, under coach Hugo Meisl, Austria's national team, known as the "Wunderteam" (literally "Miracle Team"), became a dominant force in European football. Notable achievements included a fourth-place finish in the 1934 FIFA World Cup and silver medal at the 1936 Olympic Games. The Anschluss in 1938, which annexed Austria into Nazi Germany, led to the dissolution of the ÖFB and the obligatory integration of Austrian players into the German national team for the 1938 World Cup.

After World War II, Austria reestablished its national team and achieved significant success in the 1954 World Cup, finishing third. The team continued to be competitive throughout the 1950s and 1960s, including a notable victory over England at Wembley Stadium in 1965. However, the following decades saw fluctuating fortunes, with the team failing to qualify for FIFA World Cup in the 1960s and narrowly missing out on the 1974 World Cup in a playoff against Sweden. The 1970s and 1980s marked a revival, with Austria reaching the second round in the 1978 and 1982 World Cup, highlighted by a famous victory over West Germany in 1978.

The 1990s and 2000s brought challenges and disappointments, such as a defeat to the Faroe Islands in UEFA Euro 1992 qualifying, and a group-stage exit in the 1998 World Cup, their seventh and until then, last World Cup appearance. Austria automatically qualified for UEFA Euro 2008 as co-hosts with Switzerland, the first time they played in the UEFA European Championship, but was eliminated in the group stage. The country entered a resurgence in 2016, beginning with a successful qualification campaigns for the UEFA Euro 2016, Euro 2020, Euro 2024; and after 28 years of absence in the tournament, the 2026 FIFA World Cup, with current head coach Ralf Rangnick.

== History ==
=== Pre-World War II ===
The Austrian Football Association (ÖFB) was founded on 18 March 1904 in the Austro-Hungarian Empire.

The team enjoyed success in the 1930s under coach Hugo Meisl, becoming a dominant side in Europe and earning the nickname "Wunderteam". The team's star was Matthias Sindelar. On 16 May 1931, they were the first continental European side to defeat Scotland.

In the 1934 FIFA World Cup, Austria finished fourth after losing 0–1 to Italy in the semi-finals and 2–3 to Germany in the third-place play-off.

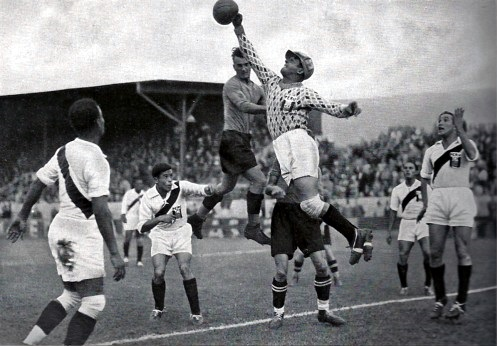
A moment of the Austria v Peru match at the 1936 Olympics.

There was controversy at the Peru v Austria match at the Football tournament of the 1936 Berlin Olympics. On 5 August, Austria beat Egypt 3–1 in their opening match. In the quarter-finals, Peru beat Austria 4–2 in extra-time. Peru had rallied from a two-goal deficit in the final 15 minutes of normal time. During extra-time, Peruvian fans allegedly ran onto the field and attacked an Austrian player. In the chaos, Peru scored twice and won, 4–2. Hitler called for a rematch, Austria protested and the International Olympic Committee ordered a replay without any spectators. The Peruvian national Olympic team refused to play the match again and withdrew from the games. The Peruvian government complained and their entire Olympic squad left in protest as did Colombia. Austria reached the final but were beaten 2–1 by Italy after extra time.

The team then qualified for the 1938 World Cup finals. Austria was annexed to Germany in the Anschluss on 12 March of that year. On 28 March, FIFA was notified that the ÖFB had been abolished, resulting in the nation's withdrawal from the World Cup. The Anschluss led to the integration of Austrian players into the German national team for the 1938 World Cup, although not including Austrian star player Matthias Sindelar, who refused to play for the unified team. Austria's place remained empty and Sweden, which would have been Austria's initial opponent, progressed directly to the second-round by default.

=== After World War II ===
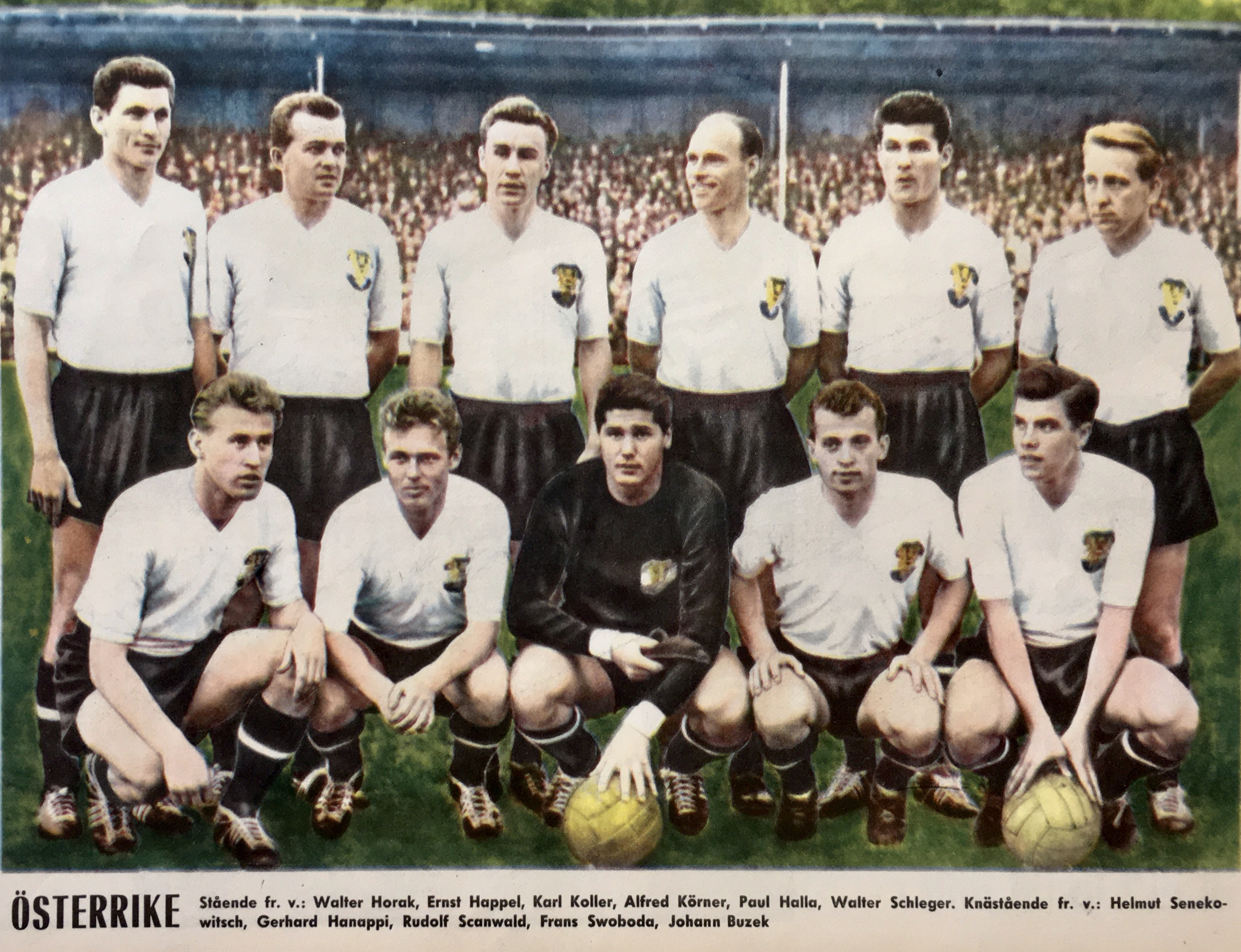
Austria national football team in 1958 with the following players – from left to right, standing; Walter Horak, Ernst Happel, Karl Koller, Alfred Körner, Paul Halla, Walter Schleger; crouched: Helmut Senekowitsch, Gerhard Hanappi, Rudolf Szanwald, Franz Swoboda and Johann Buzek.

The team was re-established in 1945 and went on to achieve their best result at a World Cup in 1954, finishing third. Their 7-5 victory over Switzerland in the same tournament set a record for the most goals scored in a World Cup match.

During the 1982 World Cup in Spain, Austria and West Germany met again, in the last match of the group stage. Because the other two teams in the group had played their last match the previous day, both teams knew that a West German win by one goal would see both through, while all other results would eliminate one team or the other. After ten minutes of furious attack, Horst Hrubesch scored for West Germany, and the two teams mainly kicked the ball around for 80 minutes with few attempts to attack. The match became known as the "non-aggression pact of Gijón". Algeria had also won two matches, including a surprise victory over West Germany in the opener. However, among the three teams that had won two matches, Algeria was eliminated due to having an inferior goal difference, having conceded two late goals in their 3–2 win over Chile. This match caused outrage between supporters of multiple national teams; as a result, all future tournaments would see the last group matches played simultaneously. Austria was then eliminated from the tournament in the second round group stage, following a draw with Northern Ireland and loss against France.

=== 21st century ===
==== 2000s: Decline ====
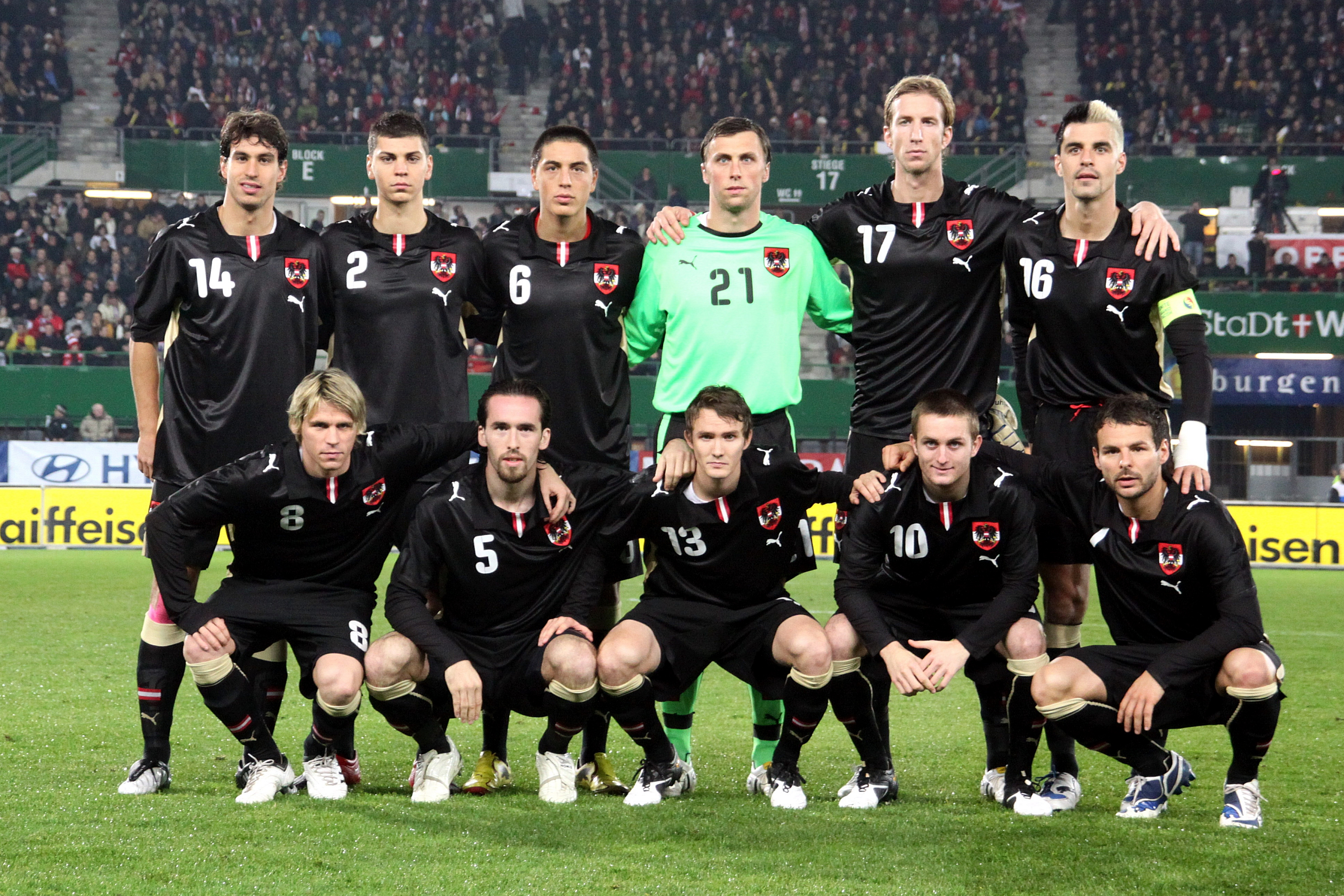
Austria national team before a match against Spain, November 2009.

Austria qualified automatically for Euro 2008 as co-hosts. Their first major tournament in a decade, most commentators regarded them as outsiders for Germany, Croatia and Poland in the group stage. Many of their home supporters were in agreement and 10,000 Austrians signed a petition demanding Austria withdraw from the tournament to spare the nation's embarrassment. However, Austria managed a 1–1 draw with Poland and lost 1–0 to both Croatia and Germany.

==== 2010s: Revival and setbacks ====
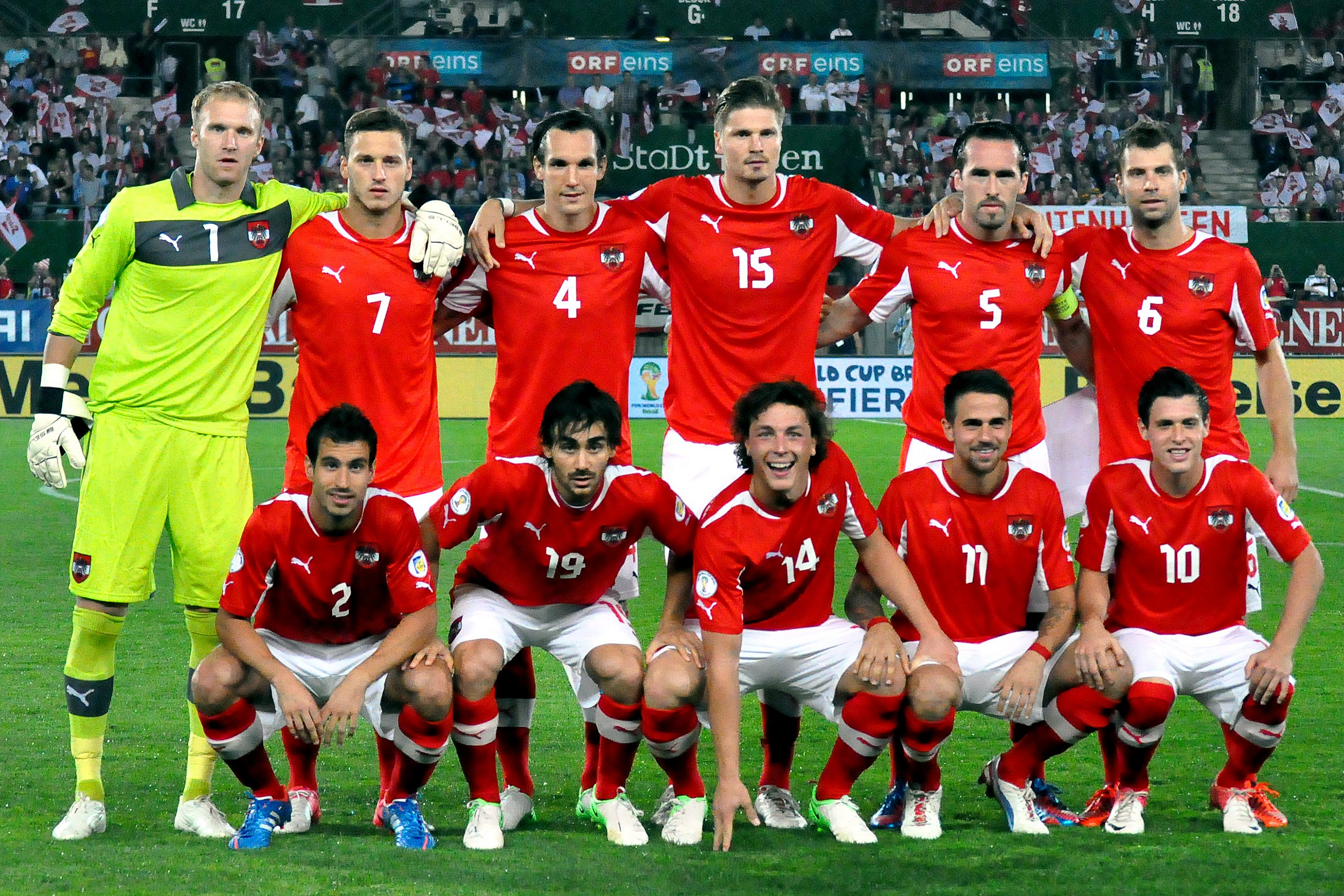
Austria vs. Germany in 2014 World Cup qualification, 11 September 2012.

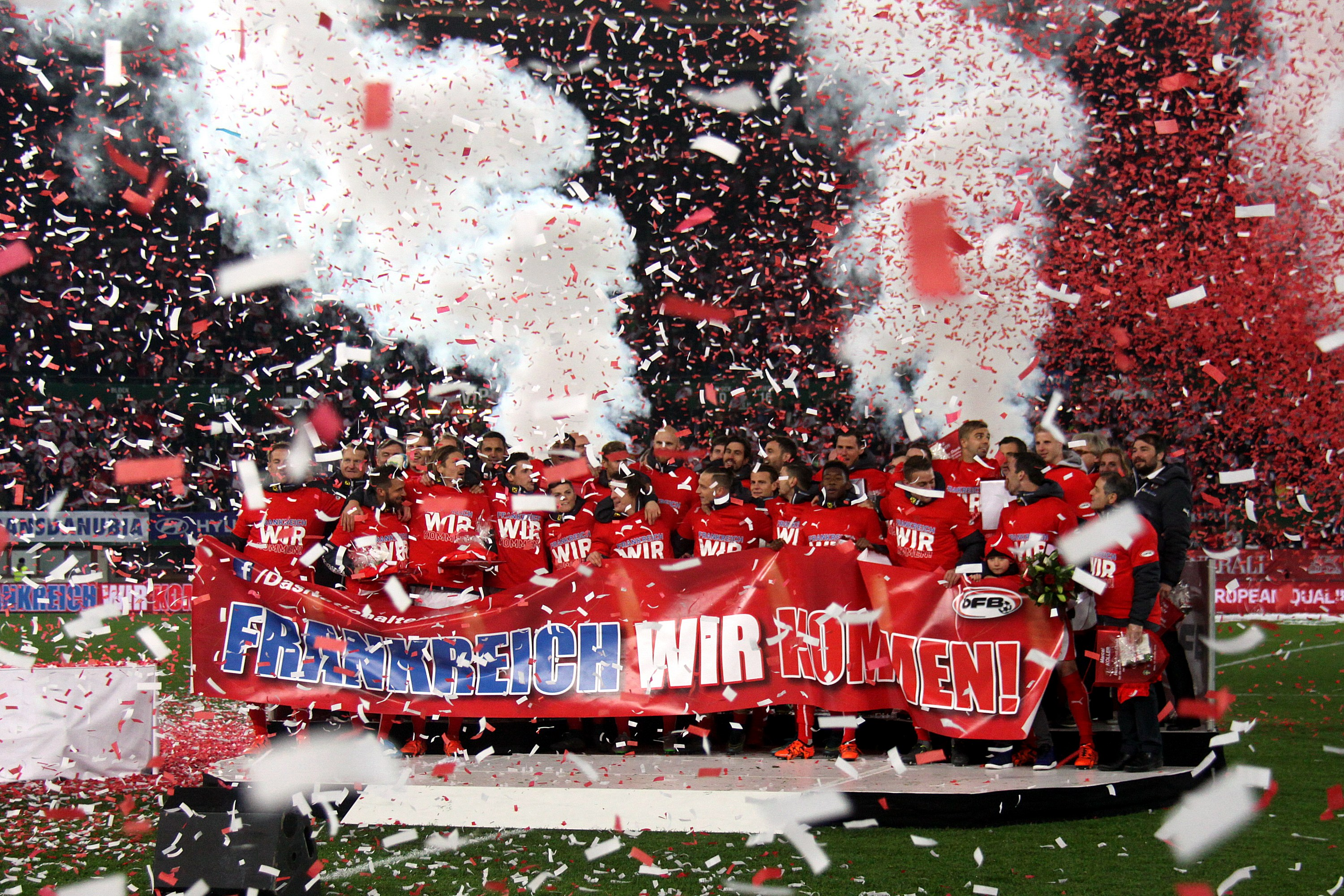
After Austria co-hosted the 2008 European Championship with Switzerland and automatically qualified, Marcel Koller's team managed to qualify for the 2016 European Championship on their own for the first time. This celebration photo was taken on 12 October 2015 after a victory against Liechtenstein.

Despite their successful performance in Euro 2016 qualifying campaign, the tournament itself turned out to be a nightmare for the Austrians. Placed in group F with Hungary, Portugal and Iceland, Austria opened their campaign with a 0–2 loss to neighbour Hungary, in which defender Aleksandar Dragović was sent off. This was followed up by a goalless draw with Portugal, in which Cristiano Ronaldo missed a penalty. Nonetheless, Austria ended up losing 1–2 to debutant Iceland and were eliminated with just a point.

==== 2020s: Tournament breakthroughs and continued growth ====
At UEFA Euro 2020 (held in 2021 due to the COVID-19 pandemic), Austria advanced to the knockout stage of the European Championship for the first time in their history. They finished second in Group C after defeating North Macedonia and Ukraine, and narrowly lost to Italy 2–1 after extra time in the Round of 16.

Austria also qualified for UEFA Euro 2024 in Germany. As of June 2024, the team was drawn into Group D alongside France, the Netherlands, and Poland. Austria finished first in their group, topping France and the Netherlands, which was considered a historic achievement. However, they were eliminated in the Round of 16 after a 2–1 loss to Turkey.

== Rivalry ==
Although the match-up between Austria and Hungary is the second most-played international match in football (only Argentina and Uruguay, another two neighboring countries, have met each other in more matches), Germany has been Austria's arch-rival since the Second World War.

=== Kits and crest ===
The national team's home kit has traditionally been a white shirt, black shorts, and black socks with a band patterned after the national flag. The colours are derived from the Teutonic Order. Their traditional away kit is the flag color: red shirt, white shorts, and red socks. In 2004, Hans Krankl, Austria’s coach and legendary former striker, made the decision to switch the kits around so that red was first choice. This was so that the kit would match the Austrian flag (red-white-red) and also distinguish them from their German neighbours. The away shirt colour has changed several times since then. The rotation starts with an all-white uniform, then black uniforms with light blue shorts and socks, and then all black.

== Results and fixtures ==
The following is a list of match results in the last 12 months, as well as any future matches that have been scheduled.

Win Draw Loss Fixture

=== 2026 ===
27 March 2026 Friendly	Austria	5–1	Ghana	Vienna, Austria
18:00 UTC+1	Sabitzer 12' (pen.); Gregoritsch 51'; Posch 59'; Chukwumeka 79'; Seiwald 90+2'	Report	J. Ayew 77'	Stadium: Ernst-Happel-Stadion; Attendance: 40,200; Referee: Mohammed Al Hoish (Saudi Arabia)

31 March 2026 Friendly	Austria	1–0	South Korea	Vienna, Austria
20:45 UTC+2	Sabitzer 48'	Report		Stadium: Ernst-Happel-Stadion; Attendance: 35,300; Referee: Sander van der Eijk (Netherlands)

1 June 2026 Friendly	Austria	1–0	Tunisia	Vienna, Austria
20:45 UTC+2	Sabitzer 63'	Report		Stadium: Ernst-Happel-Stadion; Attendance: 35,100; Referee: Jérémie Pignard (France)

10 June 2026 Friendly	Guatemala	Cancelled	Austria	Pasadena, California, United States
21:00 UTC−7				Stadium: Rose Bowl
Note: The game was cancelled because of organizational problems.

16 June 2026 2026 World Cup GS (Group J)	Austria	3–1	Jordan	Santa Clara, California, United States
21:00 UTC−7	Schmid 21'; Al-Arab 76' (o.g.); Arnautović 90+12' (pen.)	Report	Olwan 50'	Stadium: Levi's Stadium; Attendance: 68,527; Referee: Dahane Beida (Maritania)

22 June 2026 2026 World Cup GS (Group J)	Argentina	2–0	Austria	Arlington, Texas, United States
12:00 UTC−5	Messi 38', 90+5'	Report		Stadium: AT&T Stadium; Attendance: 70,649; Referee: Amin Omar (Egypt)

27 June 2026 2026 World Cup GS (Group J)	Algeria	3–3	Austria	Kansas City, Missouri, United States
21:00 UTC−5	Belghali 45'; Mahrez 60', 90+3'	Report	Arnautović 28'; Sabitzer 55'; Kalajdžić 90+6'	Stadium: Arrowhead Stadium; Attendance: 69,045; Referee: Ilgiz Tantashev (Uzbekistan)

2 July 2026 2026 World Cup Round of 32	Spain	3–0	Austria	Inglewood, California, United States
12:00 UTC−7	Oyarzabal 36', 89'; Porro 66'	Report		Stadium: SoFi Stadium; Attendance: 70,492; Referee: Glenn Nyberg (Sweden)

24 September 2026 2026–27 UEFA Nations League	Austria	3–1	Israel	Linz, Austria
20:45 UTC+2	Schmid 43' (pen.); Mwene 90'; Kalajdžić 90+3'	Report	Abu Farchi 55'	Stadium: Raiffeisen Arena; Attendance: 15,200; Referee: Georgi Kabakov (Bulgaria)

27 September 2026 2026–27 UEFA Nations League	Austria	3–1	Kosovo	Vienna, Austria
18:00 UTC+2	Affengruber 23'; Adamu 45+2'; Chukwuemeka 61'	Report	Zhegrova 83' (pen.)	Stadium: Ernst-Happel-Stadion; Attendance: 47,000; Referee: Nick Walsh (Scotland)

1 October 2026 2026–27 UEFA Nations League	Republic of Ireland	2–2	Austria	Dublin, Ireland
19:45 UTC+1	Parrott 12', 45' (pen.)	Report	Prass 71'; Gregoritsch 77'	Stadium: Aviva Stadium; Attendance: 45,784; Referee: Allard Lindhout (Netherlands)

4 October 2026 2026–27 UEFA Nations League	Kosovo	1–1	Austria	Pristina, Kosovo
18:00 UTC+2	Asllani 70'	Report	Lang 85'	Stadium: Fadil Vokrri Stadium; Attendance: 12,567; Referee: António Nobre (Portugal)

14 November 2026 2026–27 UEFA Nations League	Austria	1–0	Republic of Ireland	Linz, Austria
20:45 UTC+1	Kalajdžić 78'	Report		Stadium: Raiffeisen Arena; Attendance: 16,700; Referee: Irfan Peljto (Bosnia and Herzegovina)

17 November 2026 2026–27 UEFA Nations League	Israel	1–1	Austria	Debrecen, Hungary
21:45 UTC+2	Do. Peretz 36'	Report	Kalajdžić 62'	Stadium: Nagyerdei Stadion; Attendance: 510; Referee: Davide Massa (Italy)

== Coaching staff ==
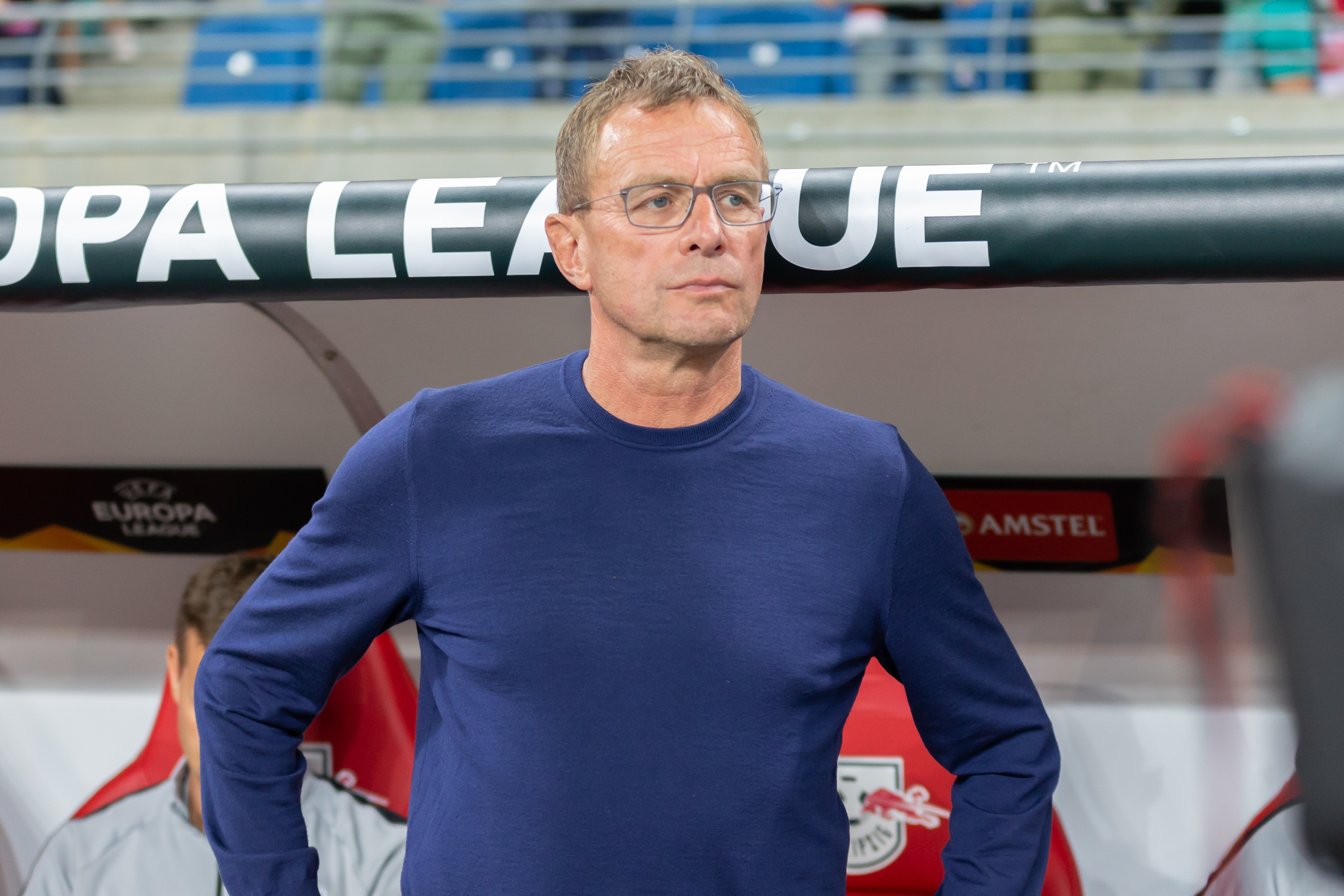
Ralf Rangnick

As of 14 September 2026, after the squad announcement for the first four games of the 2026-27 UEFA Nations League B including the announcement of Maximilian Ritscher as a new assistant coach subsequent to the departure of former assistant coach Lars Kornetka following the 2026 FIFA World Cup.

Position	Name
Head coach	(Germany) Ralf Rangnick
Assistant coaches	(Austria) Stefan Oesen (Germany) Onur Cinel (Austria) Maximilian Ritscher
Goalkeeping coach	(Austria) Michael Gspurning

=== Manager history ===
As of 27 June 2026, after the match against Algeria.

==== 1912–1999 ====
Name	Nationality	From	To	P	W	D	L	GF	GA	Win% (Note: Win% is rounded to two decimal places)	Notes
Hugo Meisl	Austria-Hungary	22 December 1912	3 October 1914	6	3	1	2	11	9	50.00	
Heinrich Retschury	Austria-Hungary	4 October 1914	1 August 1919	22	8	3	11	45	47	36.36	
Hugo Meisl	Austria	1 August 1919	17 February 1937	127	68	29	30	326	206	53.54	4th place at the 1934 World Cup. Silver medal at the 1936 Summer Olympic.
Heinrich Retschury	Austria	22 May 1937	24 October 1937	5	2	1	2	10	10	40.00	Qualified for the 1938 World Cup.
From 1938 to 1945, Austria was part of Nazi Germany.
Karl Zankl	Austria	19 August 1945	3 October 1945	2	0	0	2	2	7	0.00	Died while in the position of national coach.
Edi Bauer	Austria	3 October 1945	4 March 1948	11	4	0	7	26	28	36.36	
Eduard Frühwirth	Austria	4 March 1948	1 September 1948	5	3	0	2	9	9	60.00	
Walter Nausch	Austria	1 September 1948	15 November 1954	47	21	10	16	119	87	44.68	3rd place at the 1954 World Cup.
Hans Kaulich	Austria	15 November 1954	28 March 1955	1	0	0	1	2	3	0.00	
Josef Molzer	Austria	29 March 1955	3 September 1955	3	1	1	1	6	8	33.33	
Karl Geyer	Austria	3 September 1955	21 April 1956	5	2	0	3	8	14	40.00	
Josef Argauer Josef Molzer	Austria	21 April 1956	9 August 1958	18	7	6	5	37	27	38.89	Qualified for the 1958 World Cup.
Alfred Frey Franz Putzendopler Egon Selzer Josef Molzer	Austria	9 August 1958	15 October 1958	2	0	0	2	4	6	0.00	
Karl Decker	Austria	16 October 1958	28 February 1964	36	16	3	17	60	67	44.44	
Josef Walter Béla Guttmann	Austria Hungary	7 March 1964	11 October 1964	5	3	1	1	6	5	60.00	
Eduard Frühwirth	Austria	20 November 1964	13 January 1967	15	4	3	8	12	23	26.67	
Erwin Alge Hans Pesser	Austria	13 January 1967	24 June 1968	10	3	2	5	18	19	30	
Leopold Šťastný	Czechoslovakia	1 July 1968	30 September 1975	49	15	16	18	58	62	30.61	
Branko Elsner	Yugoslavia	6 October 1975	19 November 1975	2	1	0	1	6	3	50.00	
Helmut Senekowitsch	Austria	1 March 1976	30 June 1978	26	14	4	8	40	26	53.85	Qualified for the 1978 World Cup.
Karl Stotz	Austria	1 August 1978	14 December 1981	24	13	6	5	43	25	54.17	Qualified for the 1982 World Cup.
Georg Schmidt Felix Latzke	Austria	5 February 1982	2 July 1982	8	5	1	2	11	7	62.5	
Erich Hof	Austria	7 September 1982	21 November 1984	15	6	3	6	22	20	40	
Branko Elsner	Yugoslavia	15 January 1985	18 November 1987	18	5	5	8	20	28	27.78	
Josef Hickersberger	Austria	1 January 1988	14 September 1990	29	10	7	12	36	39	34.48	Qualified for the 1990 World Cup.
Alfred Riedl	Austria	15 September 1990	10 October 1991	8	1	3	4	6	16	12.5	
Dietmar Constantini	Austria	10 October 1991	13 November 1991	2	0	0	2	1	4	0.00	
Ernst Happel	Austria	1 January 1992	14 November 1992	9	2	3	4	18	17	22.22	Died while in the position of national coach.
Dietmar Constantini	Austria	15 November 1992	18 November 1992	1	0	1	0	0	0	0.00	
Herbert Prohaska	Austria	8 January 1993	29 March 1999	51	25	9	17	96	73	49.02	Qualified for the 1998 World Cup.

==== 2000–present ====
Name	Nationality	From	To	P	W	D	L	GF	GA	Win%	Notes
Otto Barić	Austria / Croatia	13 April 1999	21 November 2001	22	7	6	9	31	35	31.82	
Hans Krankl	Austria	21 January 2002	28 September 2005	31	10	10	11	47	46	32.26	
Willibald Ruttensteiner (caretaker)	Austria	31 September 2004	31 December 2005	2	1	0	1	2	1	50.00	
Josef Hickersberger	Austria	1 January 2006	23 June 2008	27	5	9	13	29	39	18.52	Austria co-hosted the UEFA Euro 2008
Karel Brückner	Czech Republic	25 July 2008	2 March 2009	7	1	2	4	9	15	14.29	
Dietmar Constantini	Austria	4 March 2009	13 September 2011	23	7	3	13	29	42	30.43	
Willibald Ruttensteiner	Austria	13 September 2011	11 October 2011	2	1	1	0	4	1	50.00	
Marcel Koller	Switzerland	1 November 2011	1 November 2017	54	25	13	16	81	58	46.3	Qualified for the UEFA Euro 2016
Franco Foda	Germany	1 January 2018	30 March 2022	48	27	6	15	77	52	56.25	Qualified for the UEFA Euro 2020
Ralf Rangnick	Germany	29 April 2022		49	29	9	11	93	45	59.18	Qualified for the UEFA Euro 2024; Qualified for the 2026 FIFA World Cup

== Players ==
=== Current squad ===
The following players were called up to the 2026–27 UEFA Nations League B matches against Republic of Ireland on 14 November and Israel on 17 November 2026.

Caps and goals as of 17 November 2026, after the match against Israel.

No.	Pos.	Player	Date of birth (age)	Caps	Goals	Club
1	GK	Lukas Jungwirth	30 April 2004 (age 22)	1	0	(Austrian Football Association) LASK
12	GK	Florian Wiegele	21 March 2001 (age 25)	2	0	(Football Association of the Czech Republic) Viktoria Plzeň
13	GK	Christian Zawieschitzky	2 May 2007 (age 19)	1	0	(Austrian Football Association) Red Bull Salzburg
17	GK	Alexander Schlager	1 February 1996 (age 30)	33	0	(German Football Association) Werder Bremen
2	DF	David Affengruber	19 March 2001 (age 25)	5	1	(The Football Association) Fulham
3	DF	Kevin Danso	19 September 1998 (age 28)	40	0	(The Football Association) Sunderland
5	DF	Stefan Posch	14 May 1997 (age 29)	61	5	(German Football Association) Mainz 05
14	DF	Felix Bacher	25 October 2000 (age 26)	2	0	(French Football Federation) Lyon
15	DF	Philipp Lienhart	11 July 1996 (age 30)	46	3	(German Football Association) SC Freiburg
16	DF	Phillipp Mwene	29 January 1994 (age 32)	36	1	(German Football Association) Mainz 05
23	DF	Michael Svoboda	15 October 1998 (age 28)	5	0	(The Football Association) Brighton & Hove Albion
	DF	Alexander Prass	26 May 2001 (age 25)	24	1	(German Football Association) TSG Hoffenheim
4	MF	Yanik Spalt	3 September 2007 (age 19)	1	0	(German Football Association) VfB Stuttgart
6	MF	Nicolas Seiwald	4 May 2001 (age 25)	57	1	(German Football Association) RB Leipzig
10	MF	Christoph Baumgartner	1 August 1999 (age 27)	60	19	(German Football Association) RB Leipzig
20	MF	Konrad Laimer (captain)	27 May 1997 (age 29)	65	7	(German Football Association) Bayern Munich
21	MF	Sascha Horvath	22 August 1996 (age 30)	3	0	(Austrian Football Association) LASK
22	MF	Luca Weinhandl	11 January 2009 (age 17)	1	0	(Austrian Football Association) Sturm Graz
	MF	Xaver Schlager	28 September 1997 (age 29)	59	4	(The Football Association) Nottingham Forest
7	FW	Christoph Lang	7 January 2002 (age 24)	3	1	(Austrian Football Association) LASK
8	FW	Junior Adamu	6 June 2001 (age 25)	11	1	(German Football Association) Schalke 04
9	FW	Saša Kalajdžić	7 July 1997 (age 29)	31	8	(Austrian Football Association) LASK
11	FW	Michael Gregoritsch	18 April 1994 (age 32)	83	25	(German Football Association) FC Augsburg
19	FW	Raul Florucz	10 June 2001 (age 25)	5	0	(Royal Belgian Football Association) Union Saint-Gilloise

=== Recent call-ups ===
The following players have also been called up to the Austria squad in the last twelve months.

Pos.	Player	Date of birth (age)	Caps	Goals	Club	Latest call-up
GK	Matteo Bignetti	6 May 2004 (age 22)	0	0	(Germany) 1. FC Saarbrücken	v. Kosovo, 4 October 2026
GK	Patrick Pentz	2 January 1997 (age 29)	18	0	(Denmark) Brøndby	2026 FIFA World Cup
GK	Tobias Lawal	7 June 2000 (age 26)	1	0	(Belgium) Genk	v. South Korea, 31 March 2026
DF	Marco Friedl	16 March 1998 (age 28)	13	0	(Germany) Werder Bremen	v. Kosovo, 4 October 2026
DF	Maximilian Wöber	4 February 1998 (age 28)	34	0	(Germany) Schalke 04	v. Kosovo, 4 October 2026
DF	Nikolas Veratschnig	24 January 2003 (age 23)	1	0	(Austria) Red Bull Salzburg	v. Kosovo, 27 September 2026 ^{INJ}
DF	David Alaba	24 June 1992 (age 34)	117	15	(Italy) Udinese	2026 FIFA World Cup
MF	Yusuf Demir	2 June 2003 (age 23)	4	0	(Austria) Rapid Wien	v. Israel, 17 November 2026 ^{INJ}
MF	Romano Schmid	27 January 2000 (age 26)	43	5	(Italy) Frosinone	v. Israel, 17 November 2026 ^{WD}
MF	Carney Chukwuemeka	20 October 2003 (age 23)	9	2	(Germany) Borussia Dortmund	v. Republic of Ireland, 14 November 2026 ^{INJ}
MF	Vasilije Markovic	12 May 2008 (age 18)	1	0	Austria Wien	v. Kosovo, 4 October 2026
MF	Patrick Wimmer	30 May 2001 (age 25)	36	1	(Germany) TSG Hoffenheim	v. Kosovo, 4 October 2026
MF	Paul Wanner	23 December 2005 (age 20)	9	0	(Netherlands) PSV	v. Kosovo, 27 September 2026 ^{INJ}
MF	Marcel Sabitzer	17 March 1994 (age 32)	102	27	(Germany) Borussia Dortmund	2026 FIFA World Cup
MF	Florian Grillitsch	7 August 1995 (age 31)	61	1	(Italy) Frosinone	2026 FIFA World Cup
MF	Alessandro Schöpf	7 February 1994 (age 32)	35	6	(Austria) LASK	2026 FIFA World Cup
MF	Dejan Ljubičić	8 October 1997 (age 29)	9	1	(Germany) Schalke 04	2026 FIFA World Cup
FW	Marco Grüll	6 July 1998 (age 28)	10	0	(Germany) Werder Bremen	v. Republic of Ireland, 14 November 2026 ^{INJ}
FW	Marko Arnautović ^{RET}	19 April 1989 (age 37)	137	49	(Serbia) Red Star Belgrade	2026 FIFA World Cup
^{PRE} Player was named to the preliminary squad / standby^{COV} Player withdrew from the squad due to COVID-19^{INJ} Player withdrew from the squad due to an injury^{WD} Player withdrew from the squad due to non-injury issue^{RET} Retired from international football^{SUS} Suspended in official matches

== Individual statistics ==
As of 17 November 2026, after the match against Israel.

Players in bold are still active in the national team.

=== Most capped players ===
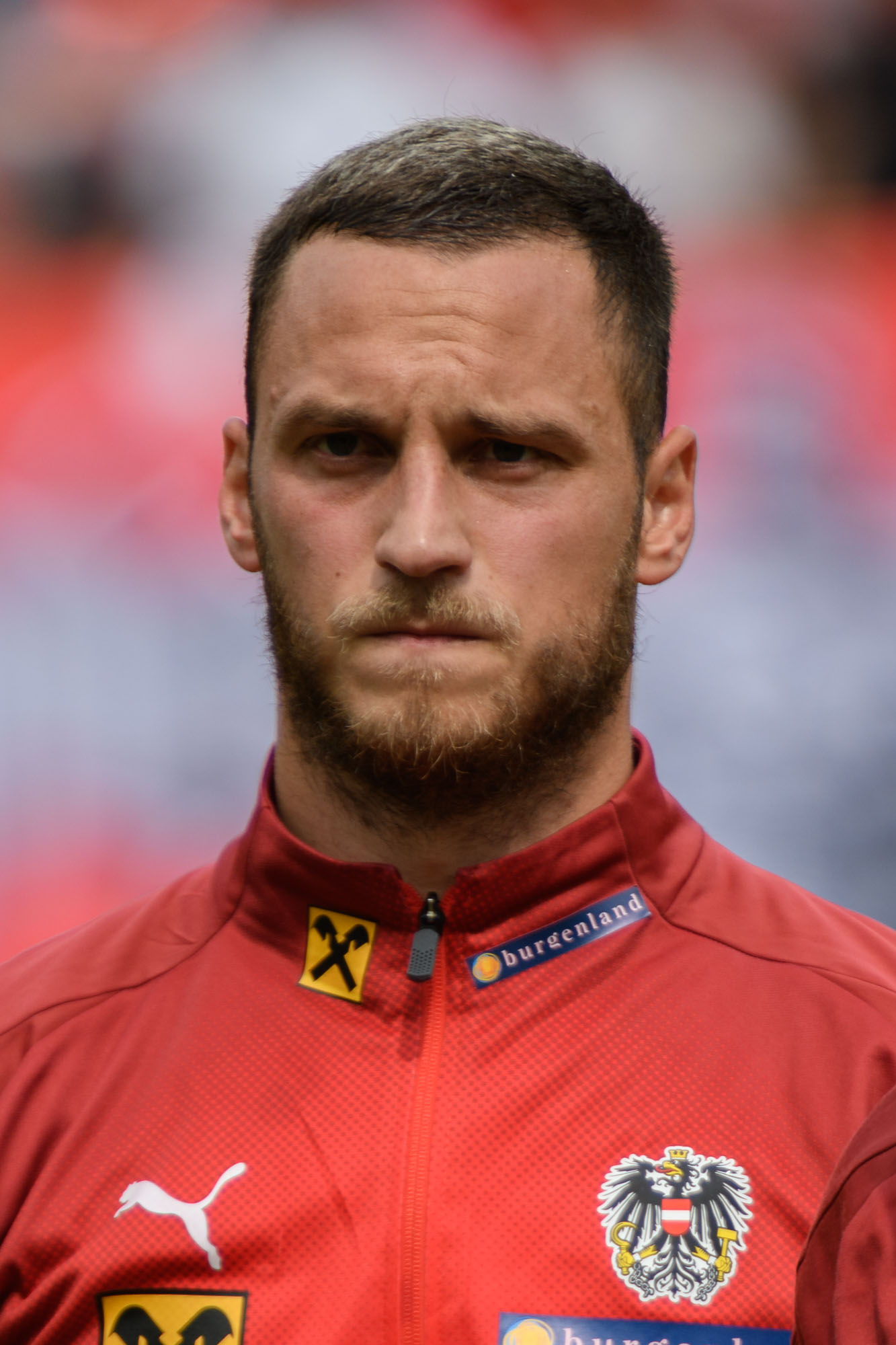
Marko Arnautović is Austria's most capped player and top scorer, with 49 goals in 137 appearances.

Rank	Player	Caps	Goals	Period
1	Marko Arnautović	137	49	2008–2026
2	**David Alaba**	117	15	2009–present
3	Andi Herzog	103	26	1988–2003
4	**Marcel Sabitzer**	102	27	2012–present
5	Aleksandar Dragović	100	2	2009–2022
6	Toni Polster	95	44	1982–2000
7	Gerhard Hanappi	93	12	1948–1964
8	Karl Koller	86	5	1952–1965
9	Julian Baumgartlinger	84	1	2009–2021
9	Friedrich Koncilia	84	0	1970–1985
9	Bruno Pezzey	84	9	1975–1990

=== Top goalscorers ===
Rank	Player	Goals	Caps	Ratio	Period
1	Marko Arnautović	49	137	0.36	2008–2026
2	Toni Polster (Note: Matches against Luxembourg (one goal), Tunisia (two goals), and Morocco are not considered full internationals and therefore not included here.)	44	95	0.46	1982–2000
3	Hans Krankl	34	69	0.49	1973–1985
4	Johann Horvath	29	46	0.63	1924–1934
5	Erich Hof	28	37	0.76	1957–1968
5	Marc Janko	28	70	0.40	2006–2019
7	Anton Schall	27	28	0.96	1927–1934
7	**Marcel Sabitzer**	27	102	0.26	2012–present
9	Matthias Sindelar	26	43	0.60	1926–1937
9	Andi Herzog	26	103	0.25	1988–2003

== Competitive record ==
=== FIFA World Cup ===
Champions Runners-up Third place Tournament played fully or partially on home soil

FIFA World Cup record										Qualification record					
Year	Result	Position	Pld	W	D	L	GF	GA	Squad	Pld	W	D	L	GF	GA
(Uruguay) 1930	Did not enter									Declined invitation					
(Italy) 1934	Fourth place	4th	4	2	0	2	7	7	Squad	1	1	0	0	6	1
(France) 1938	Qualified but withdrew									1	1	0	0	2	1
(Brazil) 1950	Did not enter									Did not enter					
(Switzerland) 1954	Third place	3rd	5	4	0	1	17	12	Squad	2	1	1	0	9	1
(Sweden) 1958	Group stage	15th	3	0	1	2	2	7	Squad	4	3	1	0	14	3
(Chile) 1962	Did not enter									Did not enter					
(England) 1966	Did not qualify									4	0	1	3	1	6
(Mexico) 1970	Did not qualify									6	3	0	3	12	7
(West Germany) 1974	Did not qualify									7	3	2	2	15	9
(Argentina) 1978	Second group stage	7th	6	3	0	3	7	10	Squad	6	4	2	0	14	2
(Spain) 1982	Second group stage	8th	5	2	1	2	5	4	Squad	8	5	1	2	16	6
(Mexico) 1986	Did not qualify									6	3	1	2	9	8
(Italy) 1990	Group stage	18th	3	1	0	2	2	3	Squad	8	3	3	2	9	9
(United States) 1994	Did not qualify									10	3	2	5	15	16
(France) 1998	Group stage	23rd	3	0	2	1	3	4	Squad	10	8	1	1	17	4
(South Korea) (Japan) 2002	Did not qualify									10	4	3	3	10	14
(Germany) 2006	Did not qualify									10	4	3	3	15	12
(South Africa) 2010	Did not qualify									10	4	2	4	14	15
(Brazil) 2014	Did not qualify									10	5	2	3	20	10
(Russia) 2018	Did not qualify									10	4	3	3	14	12
(Qatar) 2022	Did not qualify									11	5	1	5	20	19
(Canada) (Mexico) (United States) 2026	Round of 32	28th	4	1	1	2	6	9	Squad	8	6	1	1	22	4
(Morocco) (Portugal) (Spain) 2030	To be determined									To be determined					
(Saudi Arabia) 2034	To be determined									To be determined					
Total	Third place	8/23	33	13	5	15	49	56	—	142	70	30	42	254	159

=== UEFA European Championship ===
Champions Runners-up Third place Tournament played fully or partially on home soil

UEFA European Championship record										Qualification record					
Year	Result	Position	Pld	W	D	L	GF	GA	Squad	Pld	W	D	L	GF	GA
(France) 1960	Did not qualify									4	2	0	2	10	11
(Spain) 1964	Did not qualify									2	0	1	1	2	3
(Italy) 1968	Did not qualify									5	2	1	2	7	9
(Belgium) 1972	Did not qualify									6	3	1	2	14	6
(Socialist Federal Republic of Yugoslavia) 1976	Did not qualify									6	3	1	2	11	7
(Italy) 1980	Did not qualify									8	4	3	1	14	7
(France) 1984	Did not qualify									8	4	1	3	15	10
(West Germany) 1988	Did not qualify									6	2	1	3	6	9
(Sweden) 1992	Did not qualify									8	1	1	6	6	14
(England) 1996	Did not qualify									10	5	1	4	29	14
(Belgium) (Netherlands) 2000	Did not qualify									8	4	1	3	19	20
(Portugal) 2004	Did not qualify									8	3	0	5	12	14
(Austria) (Switzerland) 2008	Group stage	13th	3	0	1	2	1	3	Squad	Qualified as co-hosts					
(Poland) (Ukraine) 2012	Did not qualify									10	3	3	4	16	17
(France) 2016	Group stage	22nd	3	0	1	2	1	4	Squad	10	9	1	0	22	5
(Europe) 2020	Round of 16	12th	4	2	0	2	5	5	Squad	10	6	1	3	19	9
(Germany) 2024	Round of 16	9th	4	2	0	2	7	6	Squad	8	6	1	1	17	7
(United Kingdom) (Republic of Ireland) 2028	To be determined									To be determined					
(Italy) (Turkey) 2032	To be determined									To be determined					
Total	Round of 16	4/17	14	4	2	8	14	18	—	117	57	18	42	219	162

=== UEFA Nations League ===
Champions Runners-up Third place Tournament played fully or partially on home soil

UEFA Nations League record
Season	Division	Group	Result	Pld	W	D	L	GF	GA	P/R	RK
2018–19	B	3	Group stage	4	2	1	1	3	2	Same position	18th
2020–21	B	1	Group stage	6	4	1	1	9	6	▲	18th
2022–23	A	1	Group stage	6	1	1	4	6	10	▼	13th
2024–25	B	3	Group stage	6	3	2	1	14	5	Same position	22nd
2024–25	B	Promotion play-off	Losers	2	0	1	1	1	3	Same position	22nd
2026–27	B	3	Group stage	6	3	3	0	11	6	▲	19th
Total			Group stage	30	13	9	8	44	32	13th	

== Head-to-head record ==
As of 4 October 2026, after the match against Kosovo.

Positive Record Neutral Record Negative Record

Against	M	W	D	L	GF	GA	GD
Albania	7	7	0	0	19	2	+17
Algeria	2	1	1	0	5	3	+2
Andorra	1	1	0	0	1	0	+1
Argentina	3	0	1	2	2	8	-6
Azerbaijan	6	5	1	0	14	2	+12
Belarus	4	4	0	0	12	0	+12
Belgium	16	9	4	3	44	22	+22
Bosnia and Herzegovina	7	2	4	1	7	5	+2
Brazil	10	0	3	7	5	17	-12
Bulgaria	8	5	2	1	21	7	+14
Cameroon	3	0	2	1	1	3	-2
Canada	1	0	0	1	0	2	-2
Chile	3	1	1	1	2	3	-1
Costa Rica	2	1	1	0	4	2	+2
Croatia	7	1	0	6	6	12	-6
Cyprus	9	8	1	0	25	5	+20
Czech Republic (Note: Includes matches against Czechoslovakia.)	41	10	12	19	59	78	-19
Denmark	13	4	1	8	15	24	-9
East Germany	6	1	4	1	7	5	+2
Egypt	3	1	1	1	3	2	+1
England	19	4	4	11	27	59	-32
Estonia	4	4	0	0	9	1	+8
Faroe Islands	8	6	1	1	21	4	+17
Finland	11	8	2	1	24	11	+13
France	26	9	3	14	41	43	-2
Georgia	2	1	1	0	3	2	+1
Germany (Note: Includes matches against West Germany.)	41	10	6	25	59	90	-31
Ghana	2	1	1	0	6	2	+4
Greece	13	4	5	4	18	20	-2
Hungary	137	40	30	67	252	299	-47
Iceland	4	1	2	1	4	4	0
Iran	1	1	0	0	5	1	+4
Israel	14	7	4	3	29	26	+3
Italy	39	14	8	17	60	49	+11
Ivory Coast	2	1	0	1	3	5	-2
Japan	1	0	1	0	0	0	0
Jordan	1	1	0	0	3	1	+2
Kazakhstan	6	4	2	0	12	0	+12
Kosovo	2	1	1	0	4	2	+2
Latvia	9	6	1	2	24	9	+15
Liechtenstein	8	8	0	0	30	1	+29
Lithuania	3	2	0	1	6	3	+3
Luxembourg	7	7	0	0	29	4	+25
Malta	9	8	1	0	29	5	+24
Moldova	9	7	1	1	15	4	+11
Montenegro	2	2	0	0	4	2	+2
Netherlands	21	7	4	10	27	40	-13
Nigeria	1	0	1	0	1	1	0
North Macedonia	3	3	0	0	9	3	+6
Northern Ireland	12	6	3	4	21	19	+2
Norway	14	9	2	3	30	13	+17
Paraguay	1	0	1	0	0	0	0
Poland	11	4	2	5	20	20	0
Portugal	11	3	6	2	19	11	+8
Republic of Ireland	17	9	5	3	39	21	+18
Romania	12	4	5	3	14	14	0
Russia (Note: Includes matches against the Soviet Union.)	19	7	4	8	16	22	-6
San Marino	4	4	0	0	25	1	+24
Scotland	23	8	8	7	37	30	+7
Serbia (Note: Includes matches against Yugoslavia.)	25	8	5	12	47	52	-5
Slovakia	42	10	14	18	59	72	-13
Slovenia	6	3	2	1	7	4	+3
South Korea	1	1	0	0	1	0	+1
Spain	17	4	3	10	22	46	-24
Sweden	38	20	6	12	61	53	+8
Switzerland	43	25	6	12	106	61	+45
Trinidad and Tobago	1	1	0	0	4	1	+3
Tunisia	3	2	1	0	3	1	+2
Turkey	18	9	1	8	25	25	0
Ukraine	3	2	0	1	5	4	+1
United States	3	2	0	1	3	4	-1
Uruguay	4	2	1	1	6	5	+1
Venezuela	1	0	0	1	0	1	-1
Wales	11	5	2	4	14	11	+3
Total (74 Nations)	862	368	184	310	1,537	1,315	+222

== Honours ==
=== Global ===
- FIFA World Cup
  - Third place (1): 1954
- Olympic Games
  - Runners-up (1): 1936

=== Regional ===
- Central European International Cup
  - Champions (1): 1931–32
  - Runners-up (2): 1927–30, 1933–35
  - Third place (2): 1948–53, 1955–60

=== Summary ===
Competition	1st place, gold medalist(s)	2nd place, silver medalist(s)	3rd place, bronze medalist(s)	Total
FIFA World Cup	0	0	1	1
Olympic Games	0	1	0	1
Total	0	1	1	2

== See also ==
- Austria women's national football team
- Austria women's national under-19 football team
- Austria women's national under-17 football team
- Austria men's national under-21 football team
- Austria men's national under-19 football team
- Austria men's national under-17 football team
