= Dietmar Constantini =

Austrian footballer (1955–2024)

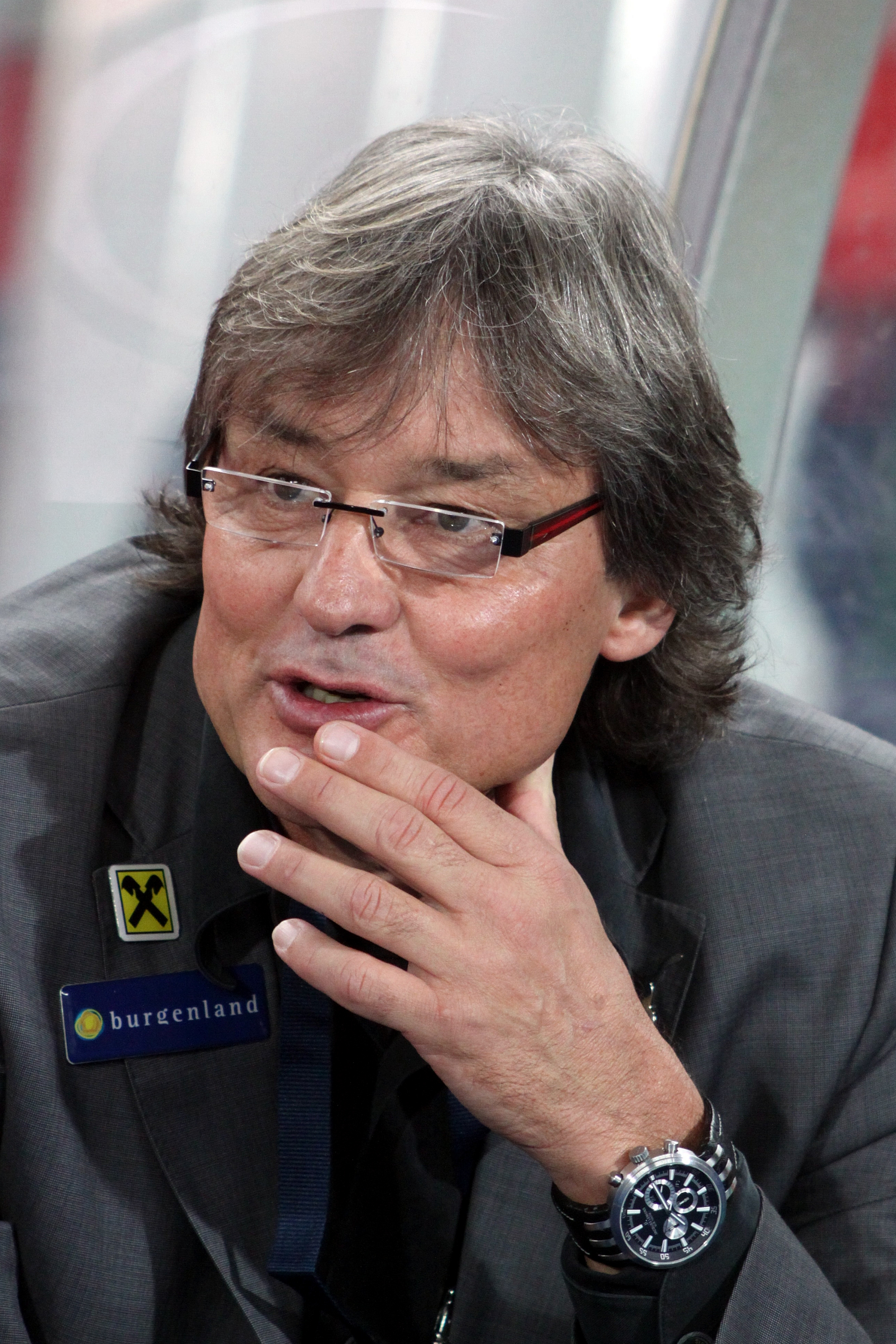
- Constantini with Austria in 2009

Personal information
- Date of birth: 30 May 1955
- Place of birth: Innsbruck, Tyrol, Austria
- Date of death: 18 December 2024 (aged 69)
- Height: 1.85 m (6 ft 1 in)
- Positions: Central defender; midfielder

Senior career*
Years	Team	Apps	(Gls)
- Wacker Innsbruck
- ESV Austria Innsbruck
1974–1979	SSW Innsbruck		
1979–1980	LASK		
- SPG Raika Innsbruck
1981–1982	Kavala		
1982–1983	FC Union Wels		
- Favoritner AC
- Wiener Sportclub
Total		198	

International career
- Austria U18

Managerial career
- Wiener Sportclub (assistant)
- Al-Ittihad (Jeddah) (assistant)
- 1989–1991: Rapid Wien (assistant)
- 1991–1992: Austria U21
- 1991: Austria (caretaker)
- 1992: Austria (assistant)
- 1992: Austria (caretaker)
- 1993: LASK
- 1993–1995: Admira Wacker Mödling
- 1995–1997: Tirol Innsbruck
- 1997–1998: Mainz 05
- 1999–2001: Austria (assistant)
- 2001–2002: Austria Wien (caretaker)
- 2003: FC Kärnten (caretaker)
- 2006: ASKÖ Pasching (caretaker)
- 2006–2007: Pasching
- 2008: Austria Wien
- 2009–2011: Austria
- * Club domestic league appearances and goals

Dietmar "Didi" Constantini (30 May 1955 – 18 December 2024) was an Austrian football player and manager.

Constantini was appointed head coach of the Austria national team in March 2009 and was replaced by Marcel Koller in October 2011.

In his career as club manager, he coached FC Kärnten, FC Pasching, and Austria Vienna, amongst others.

Constantini died on 18 December 2024, at the age of 69, after years of suffering from dementia.

== Coaching record ==
Team	From	To	Record					
Team	From	To	M	W	D	L	Win %	Ref.
Austria	16 October 1991	13 November 1991	2	0	0	2	0.00	
Austria	18 November 1992	18 November 1992	1	0	1	0	0.00	
LASK Linz	12 March 1993	30 June 1993	13	5	6	2	38.46	
Admira Wacker	1 July 1993	30 June 1995	83	33	21	29	39.76	
Tirol Innsbruck	1 July 1995	30 June 1997	85	39	19	27	45.88	
Mainz 05	16 September 1997	8 April 1998	20	4	10	6	20.00	
Austria Wien	22 December 2001	30 June 2002	16	8	4	4	50.00	
Kärnten	27 October 2003	18 January 2004	6	1	0	5	16.67	
Pasching	7 March 2006	5 June 2006	14	9	3	2	64.29	
Pasching	25 October 2006	31 May 2007	24	9	5	10	37.50	
Austria Wien	20 March 2008	31 May 2008	6	4	1	1	66.67	
Austria	4 March 2009	13 September 2011	27	8	4	15	29.63	
Total			297	120	74	103	40.40	—
