= Austria national football team results (1902–1929) =

- Win Draw Loss

This is a list of the Austria national football team results from 1902 to 1929.

== 1902 ==
12 October International Friendly	Austria	5–0	Hungary	Vienna, Austria
	Taurer 5'; Studnicka 34', ?', ?'; Huber ?'			Stadium: WAC-Platz; Attendance: 500; Referee: Roland Shires (England)

== 1903 ==
11 June International Friendly	Hungary	3–2	Austria	Margaret Island, Hungary
	Pokorny 24', 65'; Buda 52'		Pulchert 60'; Studnicka 70'	Attendance: 700; Referee: Arthur Yolland (England)

11 October International Friendly	Austria	4–2	Hungary	Vienna, Austria
	Studnicka 24', 57', 72'; Huber 64'		Borbás 18', 82'	Stadium: WAC-Platz; Attendance: 600; Referee: Geo Fuchs (Austria)
Note: Jan Studnicka set the goal scoring record for Austria (7 goals)

== 1904 ==
2 June International Friendly	Hungary	3–0	Austria	Budapest, Hungary
	Pokorny 25'; Koch 58'; Borbás 81'			Stadium: Millenáris Sporttelep; Attendance: 800; Referee: Ferenc Horváth (Hungary)

9 October International Friendly	Austria	5–4	Hungary	Vienna, Austria
	Stansfield 23', 53', 83', 84'; Bugno 27'		Károly 4'; Pokorny 30' (pen.), 41'; Borbás 67'	Stadium: Cricketer Platz; Attendance: 2,000; Referee: Theodor Holley (Austria)

== 1905 ==
9 April International Friendly	Hungary	0–0	Austria	Budapest, Hungary
				Stadium: Millenáris Sporttelep; Attendance: 6,500; Referee: Ede Herczog (Hungary)

== 1906 ==
4 November International Friendly	Hungary	3–1	Austria	Budapest, Hungary
	Molnár 26'; Schlosser 55'; Károly 65'		Hussak 75' (pen.)	Stadium: Millenáris Sporttelep; Attendance: 3,000; Referee: Ákos Fehéry (Hungary)

== 1907 ==
5 May International Friendly	Austria	3–1	Hungary	Rudolfsheim, Austria
	Dünnmann 54'; Schediwy 62'; Wolf 86'		Károly 87'	Stadium: Rapid Platz; Attendance: 2,000; Referee: Hugo Meisl (Hungary)

3 November International Friendly	Hungary	4–1	Austria	Budapest, Hungary
	Borbás 11', 37'; Vladar 18' (o.g.); Károly 47' (pen.)		Dünnmann 80'	Stadium: Millenáris Sporttelep; Attendance: 7,000; Referee: Ákos Fehéry (Hungary)

== 1908 ==
3 May International Friendly	Austria	4–0	Hungary	Vienna, Austria
	Andres 9'; Kubik 22'; Hussak 71'; Kohn 84'			Stadium: Hohe Warte Stadium; Attendance: 3,500; Referee: Theodor Holley (Austria)

6 June International Friendly	Austria	1–6	England	Vienna, Austria
	Schmieger 55'		Windridge 21', 38'; Woodward 40'; Hilsdon 57', 70'; Bridgett 85'	Stadium: Cricketer Platz; Attendance: 3,500; Referee: Christiaan Groothoff (Netherlands)

7 June International Friendly	Austria	3–2	Germany	Vienna, Austria
	Dlabac 7'; Studnicka 41'; Andres 44'		Kipp 6'; Jäger 28'	Stadium: Cricketer Platz; Attendance: 5,000; Referee: George Simmons (England)
Note: Jan Studnicka set the goal scoring record for Austria (8 goals)

8 June International Friendly	Austria	1–11	England	Vienna, Austria
	Hirschl 78'		Woodward 4', 41', 55', 84'; Windridge 6'; Rutherford 15' (pen.); Bradshaw 19', 72', 85'; Warren 66'; Bridgett 73'	Stadium: Hohe Warte Stadium; Attendance: 5,000; Referee: Ede Herczog (Hungary)

1 November International Friendly	Hungary	5–3	Austria	Budapest, Hungary
	Kaltenbrunner 3' (o.g.); Krempels 17', 59'; Schlosser 44'; Koródy 70'		Fischera 12', 79'; Studnicka 23'	Stadium: Millenáris Sporttelep; Attendance: 6,500; Referee: Heinrich Riso (Germany)
Note: Jan Studnicka set the goal scoring record for Austria (9 goals)

== 1909 ==
2 May International Friendly	Austria	3–4	Hungary	Vienna, Austria
	Neubauer 9', 57'; Schmieger 20'		Schlosser 35', 54' (pen.), 73' (pen.); Bíró 37'	Stadium: Cricketer Platz; Attendance: 1,400; Referee: Paul Neumann (Germany)

30 May International Friendly	Hungary	1–1	Austria	Budapest, Hungary
	Borbás 2'		Schrenk 17'	Stadium: Millenáris Sporttelep; Attendance: 11,000; Referee: George Simmons (England)

1 June International Friendly	Austria	1–8	England	Vienna, Austria
	Neubauer ?' (pen.)		Woodward 3', ?', ?'; Halse ?', ?'; Holley ?', ?'; Warren ?'	Stadium: Hohe Warte Stadium; Attendance: 3,000; Referee: Ferenc Schubert (Hungary)

7 November International Friendly	Hungary	2–2	Austria	Budapest, Hungary
	Schlosser 6', 48'		Schmieger 5', 62'	Stadium: Millenáris Sporttelep; Attendance: 10,000; Referee: Paul Neumann (Germany)

== 1910 ==
1 May International Friendly	Austria	2–1	Hungary	Vienna, Austria
	Fischera 2'; Hussak 33'		Dobó 8'	Stadium: Hohe Warte Stadium; Attendance: 7,000; Referee: Max Brandt (Germany)

6 November International Friendly	Hungary	3–0	Austria	Budapest, Hungary
	Koródy 27', 77'; Bodnár 82'			Stadium: Millenáris Sporttelep; Attendance: 11,000; Referee: Edgar Blüher (Germany)

== 1911 ==
1 May International Friendly	Austria	3–1	Hungary	Vienna, Austria
	Hussak 36'; Merz 38', 79'		Bodnár 20'	Stadium: Hohe Warte Stadium; Attendance: 7,000; Referee: Hubert Istace (Belgium)

10 September International Friendly	Germany	1–2	Austria	Dresden, Germany
	Worpitzky 35'; Bodnár 82'		Neumann 25'; Špindler 49'	Stadium: 1911 International Hygiene Exhibition stadium Attendance: 7,500; Referee: Herbert Willing (Netherlands)

5 November Wagner Trophy	Hungary	2–0	Austria	Budapest, Hungary
	Bodnár 30' (pen.); Koródy 53'			Stadium: Üllői úti stadion Attendance: 25,000; Referee: Henry P. Devitte (Switzerland)

== 1912 ==
5 May Wagner Trophy	Austria	1–1	Hungary	Vienna, Austria
	Fischera 87'		Bodnár 20'	Stadium: Hohe Warte Stadium; Attendance: 11,000; Referee: Jack Howcroft (England)

29 June 1912 Olympics; First round	Austria	5–1	Germany	Stockholm, Sweden
	Studnicka 58'; Neubauer 62'; Merz 75', 81'; Cimera 89'		Jäger 35'	Stadium: Råsunda IP; Attendance: 2,000; Referee: Herbert Willing (Netherlands)
Note: Jan Studnicka set the goal scoring record for Austria (10 goals)

30 June 1912 Olympics; Second round	Netherlands	3–1	Austria	Stockholm, Sweden
	Bouvy 8' ten Cate 12'; Vos 30'		Müller 41'	Stadium: Råsunda IP; Attendance: 7,000; Referee: David Phillips (Scotland)

1 July 1912 Olympics Consolation tournament first round	Austria	1–0	Norway	Stockholm, Sweden
	Neubauer 2'			Stadium: Tranebergs Idrottsplats; Attendance: 200; Referee: Per Sjöblom (Sweden)

3 July 1912 Olympics Consolation tournament semi-final	Austria	5–1	Italy	Stockholm, Sweden
	Müller 2'; Grundwald 40', 89'; Hussak 49'; Studnicka 65'		Berardo 81'	Stadium: Stockholm Olympic Stadium; Attendance: 3,500; Referee: Herbert Willing (Netherlands)
Note: Jan Studnicka set the goal scoring record for Austria (11 goals)

5 July 1912 Olympics Consolation tournament Final	Austria	0–3	Hungary	Stockholm, Sweden
			Schlosser 32'; Pataki 72'; Bodnár 73'	Stadium: Råsunda IP; Attendance: 5,000; Referee: Herbert Willing (Netherlands)

3 November Wagner Trophy	Hungary	4–0	Austria	Budapest, Hungary
	Schlosser 21', 80'; Bodnár 34'; Pataki 65'			Stadium: Üllői úti stadion Attendance: 30,000; Referee: Jack Howcroft (England)

22 December International Friendly	Italy	1–3	Austria	Genoa, Italy
	Sardi 9'		Schmieger 19'; Kuthan 54'; Kohn 79'	Stadium: Stadio Luigi Ferraris; Attendance: 6,000; Referee: Charles Barette (Belgium)

== 1913 ==
27 April Wagner Trophy	Austria	1–4	Hungary	Vienna, Austria
	Studnicka 62'		Tóth 25'; Bíró 71'; Pataki 75', 77'	Stadium: WAC Platz; Attendance: 20,000; Referee: John Howcroft (England)
Note: Jan Studnicka set the goal scoring record for Austria (12 goals)

15 June International Friendly	Austria	2–0	Italy	Vienna, Austria
	Brandstätter 36', 87'			Stadium: WAC Platz; Attendance: 10,000; Referee: Ákos Fehéry (Hungary)

26 October Wagner Trophy	Hungary	4–3	Austria	Budapest, Hungary
	Kertész 4', 25'; Hlavay 40'; Pataki 68'		Schwarz 28'; Merz 80'; Dittrich 84' (pen.)	Stadium: Hungária körúti stadion Attendance: 32,000; Referee: James Schumacher (England)

== 1914 ==
11 January International Friendly	Italy	0–0	Austria	Milan, Italy
				Stadium: Arena Civica; Attendance: 15,000; Referee: John Howcroft (England)

3 May Wagner Trophy	Austria	2–0	Hungary	Vienna, Austria
	Fischera 19', 34'			Stadium: WAC Platz; Attendance: 19,627; Referee: Albert Meerum-Terwogt (Netherlands)

4 October International Friendly	Hungary	2–2	Austria	Budapest, Hungary
	Pótz-Nagy 54'; Schlosser 72'		Studnicka 36'; Swatosch 45'	Stadium: Üllői úti stadion Attendance: 12,000; Referee: Ákos Fehéry (Hungary)

8 November International Friendly	Austria	1–2	Hungary	Vienna, Austria
	Kuthan 68'		Konrád 59'; Bodnár 87'	Stadium: WAC Platz; Attendance: 5,000; Referee: Wilhelm Schmieger (Austria)

== 1915 ==
2 May International Friendly	Hungary	2–5	Austria	Budapest, Hungary
	Prohazka 44' (o.g.); Pataki 71'		Studnicka 26', 46'; Kuthan 36'; Hoel 55'; Ehrlich 87'	Stadium: Hungária körúti stadion Attendance: 16,000; Referee: Ferenc Schubert (Hungary)
Note: Jan Studnicka set the goal scoring record for Austria (15 goals)

30 May International Friendly	Austria	1–2	Hungary	Vienna, Austria
	Swatosch 80'		Schlosser 5'; Borbás 22'	Stadium: WAC Platz; Attendance: 8,000; Referee: Wilhelm Schmieger (Austria)

3 October International Friendly	Austria	4–2	Hungary	Vienna, Austria
	Heinzl 20', 26'; Bauer 65', 85'		Schlosser 14'; Kertész 52'	Stadium: WAC Platz; Attendance: 1,200; Referee: Heinrich Retschury (Austria)

7 November International Friendly	Hungary	6–2	Austria	Budapest, Hungary
14:30 (UTC+1:00)	Kraupar 7' (o.g.); Schaffer 21', 75', 90'; Tóth 58', 76'		Hoel 25'; Studnicka 80'	Stadium: Hungária körúti stadion Attendance: 16,000; Referee: Aladár Oláh (Hungary)

== 1916 ==
7 May International Friendly	Austria	3–1	Hungary	Vienna, Austria
	Bauer 62', 70'; Studnicka 76'		Kertész 58'	Stadium: WAC Platz; Attendance: 8,000; Referee: Wilhelm Schmieger (Austria)
Note: Jan Studnicka set the goal scoring record for Austria (17 goals)

4 June International Friendly	Hungary	2–1	Austria	Budapest, Hungary
	Schaffer 11'; Schlosser 25'		Bauer 27'	Stadium: Hungária körúti stadion Attendance: 16,000; Referee: Aladár Oláh (Hungary)

1 October International Friendly	Hungary	2–3	Austria	Budapest, Hungary
	Schaffer 11'; Tóth 21'		Bauer 2', 30'; Grundwald 15'	Stadium: Üllői úti stadion Attendance: 16,000; Referee: Imre Vértes (Hungary)

5 November International Friendly	Austria	3–3	Hungary	Vienna, Austria
	Bauer 17', 52'; Kraus 25'		Schlosser 22'; Konrád 45'; Schaffer 56'	Stadium: WAC Platz; Attendance: 7,000; Referee: Max Seemann (Austria)

== 1917 ==
6 May International Friendly	Austria	1–1	Hungary	Vienna, Austria
	Heinzl 45'		Schlosser 18'	Stadium: WAC Platz; Attendance: 4,000; Referee: Wilhelm Schmieger (Austria)

3 June International Friendly	Hungary	6–2	Austria	Budapest, Hungary
	Urik 13'; Schaffer 16', 63'; Schlosser 40', 45'; Weisz 41'		Heinzl 9'; Popovic 76'	Stadium: Hungária körúti stadion Attendance: 22,000; Referee: Karl Winkler (Germany)

15 July International Friendly	Austria	1–4	Hungary	Vienna, Austria
	Prousek 50'		Schaffer 39', 73', 77'; Schlosser 55'	Stadium: WAC Platz; Attendance: 4,000; Referee: Rudolf Pohl (Germany)

7 October International Friendly	Hungary	2–1	Austria	Budapest, Hungary
	Schaffer 40'; Taussig 52'		Sedláček 67'	Stadium: Üllői úti stadion Attendance: 20,000; Referee: Erich Chemnitz (Germany)

4 November International Friendly	Austria	1–2	Hungary	Vienna, Austria
	Wilda 61'		Schaffer 12', 33'	Stadium: WAC Platz; Attendance: 12,000; Referee: Kurt Von Paquet (Germany)

23 December International Friendly	Switzerland	0–1	Austria	Basel, Switzerland
			Bauer 75'	Stadium: Landhof; Attendance: 3,500; Referee: John Forster (Switzerland)

26 December International Friendly	Switzerland	3–2	Austria	Zürich, Switzerland
	Haas 6', 70'; Huber 87'		Neubauer 84'	Stadium: Vélodrome Hardau; Attendance: 2,000; Referee: John Forster (Switzerland)

== 1918 ==
14 April International Friendly	Hungary	2–0	Austria	Budapest, Hungary
	Schlosser 26'; Schaffer 52' (pen.)			Stadium: Hungária körúti stadion Attendance: 20,000; Referee: Angelo Rossi (Germany)

9 May International Friendly	Austria	5–1	Switzerland	Vienna, Austria
	Wilda 26'; Bauer 46'; Koželuh 80'; Peterli 82' (o.g.); Studnicka 84'		Keller 53'	Stadium: WAC Platz; Attendance: 18,000; Referee: Ákos Fehéry (Hungary)
Note: Jan Studnicka set the goal scoring record for Austria (18 goals)

2 June International Friendly	Austria	0–2	Hungary	Vienna, Austria
			Schlosser 70'; Schaffer 73'	Stadium: WAC Platz; Attendance: 15,000; Referee: Angelo Rossi (Germany)

6 October International Friendly	Austria	0–3	Hungary	Vienna, Austria
			Payer 5' (pen.), 63' (pen.); Pataki 77'	Stadium: WAC Platz; Attendance: 15,000; Referee: Otto Kehm (Germany)

== 1919 ==
6 April International Friendly	Hungary	2–1	Austria	Budapest, Hungary
	Orth 45'; Braun 80'		Wondrak 22'	Stadium: Üllői úti stadion Attendance: 35,000; Referee: Hugó Szüsz (Hungary)

5 October International Friendly	Austria	2–0	Hungary	Vienna, Austria
	Bauer 40'; Uridil 44'			Stadium: WAC Platz; Attendance: 22,000; Referee: Heinrich Retschury (Austria)

9 November International Friendly	Hungary	3–2	Austria	Budapest, Hungary
	Pataki 7', 29' (pen.); Orth 27'		Hansl 58'; Tremmel 79'	Stadium: Hungária körúti stadion Attendance: 27,000; Referee: Hugó Szüsz (Hungary)

== 1920 ==
2 May International Friendly	Austria	2–2	Hungary	Vienna, Austria
	Wieser 43'; Swatosch 66'		Tóth 37'; Pataki 44'	Stadium: WAC Platz; Attendance: 20,000; Referee: Wilhelm Schmieger (Austria)

26 September International Friendly	Austria	3–2	Germany	Vienna, Austria
	Swatosch 64', 83', 86'		Sutor 56'; Seiderer 87'	Stadium: Simmeringer Had; Attendance: 30,000; Referee: Ákos Fehéry (Austria)

7 November International Friendly	Hungary	1–2	Austria	Budapest, Hungary
	Braun 59'		Kuthan 24'; Swatosch 43'	Stadium: Hungária körúti stadion Attendance: 30,000; Referee: Christiaan Groothoff (Netherlands)

== 1921 ==
26 March International Friendly	Austria	2–2	Sweden	Vienna, Austria
	Kuthan 43', 86'		Horndahl 5'; E. Andersson 88'	Stadium: Simmeringer Had; Attendance: 35,000; Referee: Wolf Boas (Netherlands)

24 April International Friendly	Austria	4–1	Hungary	Vienna, Austria
	Kuthan 51', 53' (pen.); Wondrak 63'; Neubauer 70'		Orth 67'	Stadium: Simmeringer Had; Attendance: 50,000; Referee: Johannes Mutters (Netherlands)

1 May International Friendly	Switzerland	2–2	Austria	St. Gallen, Switzerland
	Brand 46'; Friedrich 75'		Kuthan 52'; Neubauer 63'	Stadium: Espenmoos-Stadion; Attendance: 8,000; Referee: Carl Koppehel (Germany)

5 May International Friendly	Germany	3–3	Austria	Dresden, Germany
	Popp 7'; Träg 14'; Seiderer 58'		Kuthan 33' (pen.); Wondrak 58'; Uridil 70'	Stadium: Dresdner Fußballring Stadion; Attendance: 20,000; Referee: Willem Eijmers (Netherlands)

24 July International Friendly	Sweden	1–3	Austria	Stockholm, Sweden
	Dahl 44'		Uridil 9'; Kuthan 17', 59'	Stadium: Stockholm Olympic Stadium; Attendance: 18,000; Referee: Wolf Boas (Netherlands)

31 July International Friendly	Finland	2–3	Austria	Helsinki, Finland
	Mantila 26'; Blum 65' (o.g.)		Uridil 47', 80'; Neumann 68'	Stadium: Töölön Pallokenttä; Attendance: 8,000; Referee: Wolf Boas (Netherlands)

== 1922 ==
15 January International Friendly	Italy	3–3	Austria	Milan, Italy
	Moscardini 16', 46'; Santamaria 26'		De Vecchi 20' (o.g.); Köck 25'; Hansl 75'	Stadium: Velodromo Sempione; Attendance: 8,000; Referee: John Forster (Switzerland)

23 April International Friendly	Austria	0–2	Germany	Vienna, Austria
			Weißenbacher 69'; Jäger 77'	Stadium: Hohe Warte Stadium; Attendance: 70,000; Referee: György Gerő (Hungary)

30 April International Friendly	Hungary	1–1	Austria	Budapest, Hungary
	Molnár 51'		Jiszda 41'	Stadium: Hungária körúti stadion Attendance: 30,000; Referee: Peco Bauwens (Germany)

11 June International Friendly	Austria	7–1	Switzerland	Vienna, Austria
	Uridil 17', 27', 29'; Kuthan 30', 57'; Fischera 58', 89'		Leiber 23'	Stadium: Hohe Warte Stadium; Attendance: 50,000; Referee: Johannes Mutters (Netherlands)

24 September International Friendly	Austria	2–2	Hungary	Vienna, Austria
	Kuthan 17'; Wesely 80'		Priboj 22', 71'	Stadium: Hohe Warte Stadium; Attendance: 65,000; Referee: Peco Bauwens (Germany)

26 November International Friendly	Hungary	1–2	Austria	Budapest, Hungary
	Molnár 21'		Swatosch 61'; Kowanda 67'	Stadium: Üllői úti stadion Attendance: 30,000; Referee: Carl Koppehel (Germany)

== 1923 ==
21 January International Friendly	Switzerland	2–0	Austria	Geneva, Switzerland
	Pache 44', 57'			Stadium: Parc des Sports; Attendance: 12,000; Referee: Giovanni Mauro (Italy)

15 April International Friendly	Austria	0–0	Italy	Vienna, Austria
				Stadium: Hohe Warte Stadium; Attendance: 70,400; Referee: Wolf Boas (Netherlands)

6 May International Friendly	Austria	1–0	Hungary	Vienna, Austria
	Swatosch 79'			Stadium: Hohe Warte Stadium; Attendance: 40,000; Referee: Emil Grätz (Czechoslovakia)

10 June International Friendly	Sweden	4–2	Austria	Gothenburg, Sweden
	H. Dahl 39'; Olsson 43'; C. Dahl 73', 88'		Swatosch 40'; Wieser 52'	Stadium: Slottsskogsvallen; Attendance: 9,500; Referee: Karel Herites (Czechoslovakia)

15 August International Friendly	Austria	2–1	Finland	Vienna, Austria
	Wieser 5', 75'		Eklöf 42'	Stadium: Hohe Warte Stadium; Attendance: 35,000; Referee: František Cejnar (Czechoslovakia)

23 September International Friendly	Hungary	2–0	Austria	Budapest, Hungary
	Molnár 69' (pen.); Csontos 72'			Stadium: Hungária körúti stadion Attendance: 38,000; Referee: Emil Grätz (Czechoslovakia)

== 1924 ==
13 January International Friendly	Germany	4–3	Austria	Nürnberg, Germany
	Auer 24'; Franz 35', 42' (pen.), 72'		Swatosch 67'; Jiszda 79'; Horvath 83'	Stadium: Stadion im Zerzabelshof; Attendance: 20,000; Referee: Ernst Hebak (Czechoslovakia)

20 January International Friendly	Italy	0–4	Austria	Genoa, Italy
			Wieser 38' (pen.), 46'; Swatosch 42'; Jiszda 75'	Stadium: Stadio Luigi Ferraris; Attendance: 17,000; Referee: Charles Barette (Belgium)

10 February International Friendly	Yugoslavia	1–4	Austria	Zagreb, Yugoslavia
	Jovanović 56'		Wieser 4', 59', 87'; Hofbauer 55' (pen.)	Stadium: Stadion Concordije; Attendance: 10,000; Referee: Karel Herites (Netherlands)

4 May International Friendly	Hungary	2–2	Austria	Budapest, Hungary
	Eisenhoffer 5', 64'		Horvath 48'; Wieser 88'	Stadium: Hungária körúti stadion Attendance: 40,000; Referee: Arthur Björklund (Sweden)

20 May International Friendly	Austria	4–1	Romania	Vienna, Austria
	Kanhäuser 2', 52', 85'; Häusler 77'		Ströck 73'	Stadium: Simmeringer Had; Attendance: 7,000; Referee: Peco Bauwens (Germany)

21 May International Friendly	Austria	6–0	Bulgaria	Vienna, Austria
	Horvath 31', 48', 49'; Grünwald 45', 49'; Danis 73'			Stadium: Simmeringer Had; Attendance: 10,000; Referee: Tivadar Kiss (Hungary)

22 June International Friendly	Austria	3–1	Egypt	Vienna, Austria
	Höss 47'; Wesely 52'; Horvath 54'		Ali Rheyad 67'	Stadium: Hohe Warte Stadium; Attendance: 50,000; Referee: Karel Herites (Czechoslovakia)

14 September International Friendly	Austria	2–1	Hungary	Vienna, Austria
	Horvath 40'; Wesely 87'		Orth 45'	Stadium: Hohe Warte Stadium; Attendance: 45,000; Referee: Charles Barette (Belgium)

9 November International Friendly	Austria	1–1	Sweden	Vienna, Austria
	Wesely 23' (pen.)		Paulsson 41'	Stadium: Simmeringer Had; Attendance: 40,000; Referee: Marcel Slawick (France)

21 December International Friendly	Spain	2–1	Austria	Barcelona, Spain
	Juantegui 3'; Samitier 87'		Horvath 31'	Stadium: Camp de Les Corts; Attendance: 25,000; Referee: Charles Barette (Belgium)

== 1925 ==
22 March International Friendly	Austria	2–0	Switzerland	Vienna, Austria
	Gschweidl 4'; Horvath 41'			Stadium: Hohe Warte Stadium; Attendance: 40,000; Referee: Mihály Ivanicsics (Hungary)

19 April International Friendly	France	0–4	Austria	Paris, France
			Swatosch 11', 27'; Wieser 22'; Cutti 84'	Stadium: Stade Pershing; Attendance: 25,000; Referee: Antonio Scamoni (Italy)

5 May International Friendly	Austria	3–1	Hungary	Vienna, Austria
	Häusler 31'; Haftl 38', 88'		Takács 24'	Stadium: Hohe Warte Stadium; Attendance: 43,000; Referee: František Cejnar (Czechoslovakia)

19 April International Friendly	Czechoslovakia	3–1	Austria	Prague, Czechoslovakia
	Sedláček 33'; Čapek 58'; Severin 63'		Swatosch 52'	Stadium: Letenský stadion Attendance: 15,000; Referee: Charles Barette (Belgium)

5 July International Friendly	Sweden	2–4	Austria	Stockholm, Sweden
	Rydell 64'; Keller 82'		Horvath 11', 22', 61'; Swatosch 60'	Stadium: Stockholm Olympic Stadium; Attendance: 14,000; Referee: Peco Bauwens (Germany)

10 July International Friendly	Finland	1–2	Austria	Helsinki, Finland
	Eklöf 4' (pen.)		Dumser 40'; Wesely 50'	Stadium: Töölön Pallokenttä; Attendance: 4,000; Referee: Axel Bergqvist (Sweden)

20 September International Friendly	Hungary	1–1	Austria	Budapest, Hungary
	Priboj 36'		Buza 49' (o.g.)	Stadium: Üllői úti stadion Attendance: 33,000; Referee: Karel Herites (Czechoslovakia)

27 September International Friendly	Austria	0–1	Spain	Vienna, Austria
			Cubells 16'	Stadium: Hohe Warte Stadium; Attendance: 55,000; Referee: František Cejnar (Czechoslovakia)

8 November International Friendly	Switzerland	2–0	Austria	Bern, Switzerland
	Abegglen 60'; Passello 68'			Stadium: Wankdorf Stadium; Attendance: 12,000; Referee: Mihály Ivanicsics (Hungary)

13 December International Friendly	Belgium	3–4	Austria	Ougrée, Belgium
	Thys 1'; Gillis 47'; Braine 61'		Wieser 2'; Cutti 6', 11'; Hierländer 55'	Stadium: Stade du Pont d'Ougrée; Attendance: 18,000; Referee: Johannes Mutters (Netherlands)

== 1926 ==
14 March International Friendly	Austria	2–0	Czechoslovakia	Vienna, Austria
	Cutti 20'; Hierländer 60'			Stadium: Hohe Warte Stadium; Attendance: 40,000; Referee: Mihály Ivanicsics (Hungary)

2 May International Friendly	Hungary	0–3	Austria	Budapest, Hungary
			Eckl 7'; Hanel 43'; Cutti 54'	Stadium: Hungária körúti stadion Attendance: 35,000; Referee: Karel Herites (Czechoslovakia)

30 May International Friendly	Austria	4–1	France	Vienna, Austria
	Hanel 16'; Wesely 61', 89'; Juranic 65'		Crut 11'	Stadium: Simmeringer Had; Attendance: 25,000; Referee: František Cejnar (Czechoslovakia)

19 September International Friendly	Austria	2–3	Hungary	Vienna, Austria
	Wesely 55'; Höss 56'		Holzbauer 2'; Jeszmás 62'; Kohut 83'	Stadium: Hohe Warte Stadium; Attendance: 40,000; Referee: Ladislav Štépanovský (Czechoslovakia)

28 September International Friendly	Czechoslovakia	1–2	Austria	Prague, Czechoslovakia
	Jelínek 49'		Sindelar 27'; Wortmann 83'	Stadium: Letenský stadion Attendance: 20,000; Referee: John Langenus (Belgium)

10 October International Friendly	Austria	7–1	Switzerland	Vienna, Austria
	Klima 3'; Sindelar 13', 56'; Horvath 14', 42', 55'; Wesely 90'		Poretti 51'	Stadium: Hohe Warte Stadium; Attendance: 19,027; Referee: Ferenc Gerő (Hungary)

7 November International Friendly	Austria	3–1	Sweden	Vienna, Austria
	Horvath 1'; Klima 44'; Sindelar 83'		Rydberg 14'	Stadium: Hohe Warte Stadium; Attendance: 38,000; Referee: Peco Bauwens (Germany)

== 1927 ==
20 March International Friendly	Austria	1–2	Czechoslovakia	Vienna, Austria
	Blum 87'		Puč 3'; Maloun 11'	Stadium: Hohe Warte Stadium; Attendance: 45,000; Referee: Mihály Ivanicsics (Hungary)

10 April International Friendly	Austria	6–0	Hungary	Vienna, Austria
	Jiszda 26', 32'; Rappan 29'; Blum 42' (pen.); Wesely 54'; Horvath 84'			Stadium: Hohe Warte Stadium; Attendance: 42,000; Referee: František Cejnar (Czechoslovakia)

22 May International Friendly	Austria	4–1	Belgium	Vienna, Austria
	Jiszda 11'; Schall 52', 78'; Wesely 73'		Braine 35'	Stadium: Hohe Warte Stadium; Attendance: 30,000; Referee: Mihály Ivanicsics (Hungary)

29 May International Friendly	Switzerland	1–4	Austria	Zürich, Switzerland
	Jäggi 68'		de Weck 20' (o.g.); Giebisch 40'; Blum 48' (pen.); Jiszda 84'	Stadium: Sportplatz Förrlibuck; Attendance: 17,000; Referee: Johannes Mutters (Netherlands)

18 September 1927–30 Antonín Švehla Cup	Czechoslovakia	2–0	Austria	Prague, Czechoslovakia
	Podrazil 10'; Kratochvíl 55' (pen.)			Stadium: Strahov Stadium; Attendance: 25,000; Referee: Josip Fabris (Yugoslavia)

25 September 1927–30 Antonín Švehla Cup	Hungary	5–3	Austria	Budapest, Hungary
	Takács 18'; Kohut 27'; Ströck 51'; Holzbauer 62'; Hirzer 67'		Wesely 11', 84'; Siegl 13'	Stadium: Üllői úti stadion Attendance: 38,000; Referee: Albert Prince-Cox (England)

6 November 1927–30 Antonín Švehla Cup	Italy	0–1	Austria	Bologna, Italy
			Runge 44'	Stadium: Stadio Littoriale; Attendance: 30,000; Referee: Albert Prince-Cox (England)

== 1928 ==
8 January International Friendly	Belgium	1–2	Austria	Brussels, Belgium
	Ledent 75' (pen.)		Hierländer 8'; Wesely 59'	Stadium: Edmond Machtens Stadium; Attendance: 25,000; Referee: Egelbert George van Bisselick (Belgium)

1 April 1927–30 Antonín Švehla Cup	Austria	0–1	Czechoslovakia	Vienna, Austria
			Silný 38'	Stadium: Hohe Warte Stadium; Attendance: 50,575; Referee: John Langenus (Belgium)

6 May International Friendly	Hungary	5–5	Austria	Budapest, Hungary
	Kohut 2', 27', 43'; Hirzer 16' (pen.); Ströck 50'		Weselik 23', 37', 52'; Kirbes 82'; Wesely 90' (pen.)	Stadium: Hungária körúti stadion Attendance: 33,000; Referee: Augustin Krist (Czechoslvakia)

6 May International Friendly	Austria	3–0	Yugoslavia	Vienna, Austria
	Schneider 26'; Juranic 52', 68'			Stadium: Hohe Warte Stadium; Attendance: 15,000; Referee: Bohumil Ženišek (Czechoslovakia)

29 July International Friendly	Sweden	2–3	Austria	Stockholm, Sweden
	Lundahl 17', 22'		Gschweidl 25'; Smistik 35'; Seidl 71'	Stadium: Stockholm Olympic Stadium; Attendance: 17,000; Referee: Lauritz Andersen (Denmark)

7 October 1927–30 Antonín Švehla Cup	Austria	5–1	Hungary	Vienna, Austria
	Siegl 11', 27'; Weselik 55'; Wesely 62'; Gschweidl 75'		Hirzer 38'	Stadium: Hohe Warte Stadium; Attendance: 40,000; Referee: Alfred Birlem (Germany)

28 October 1927–30 Antonín Švehla Cup	Austria	2–0	Switzerland	Vienna, Austria
	Tandler 25', 29' (pen.)			Stadium: Hohe Warte Stadium; Attendance: 38,447; Referee: Peco Bauwens (Germany)

== 1929 ==
17 March International Friendly	Czechoslovakia	3–3	Austria	Prague, Czechoslovakia
	Silný 43'; Šoltys 47'; Svoboda 80'		Siegl 18'; Weselik 20', 87'	Stadium: Letenský stadion Attendance: 23,000; Referee: Frigyes Klug (Hungary)

7 April 1927–30 Antonín Švehla Cup	Austria	3–0	Italy	Vienna, Austria
	Horvath 19', 38'; Weselik 23'			Stadium: Hohe Warte Stadium; Attendance: 50,000; Referee: Albert Prince-Cox (England)

5 May International Friendly	Austria	2–2	Hungary	Vienna, Austria
	Siegl 25'; Weselik 82'		Takács 15', 89'	Stadium: Hohe Warte Stadium; Attendance: 49,000; Referee: Albino Carraro (Italy)

15 September International Friendly	Austria	2–1	Czechoslovakia	Vienna, Austria
	Gschweidl 38'; Weselik 41' (pen.)		Kratochvíl 28'	Stadium: Hohe Warte Stadium; Attendance: 37,198; Referee: Albino Carraro (Italy)

6 October International Friendly	Hungary	2–1	Austria	Budapest, Hungary
	Takács 11'; Avar 52'		Klima 82'	Stadium: Hungária körúti stadion Attendance: 32,000; Referee: Sophus Hansen (Denmark)

27 October 1927–30 Antonín Švehla Cup	Switzerland	1–3	Austria	Bern, Switzerland
	Passello 45'		Stoiber 25'; Horvath 62'; Schall 84'	Stadium: Wankdorf Stadium; Attendance: 16,000; Referee: Per Andersen (Norway)
