= Hungary national football team results (1902–1929) =

This article provides details of international football games played by the Hungary national football team from 1902 to 1929.

Between their first match in 1902 and 1929, Hungary played in 139 matches, resulting in 71 victories, 27 draws and 41 defeats. Throughout this period they played in the 1912 Summer Olympics, in which Hungary won the consolation tournament after beating Austria 3–0 in the final. Notable figures during these years was Imre Schlosser who become the first player to score 50 international goals during this period, including a hat-trick in the consolation tournament semi-finals against Germany.

== Results ==
=== 1902 ===
12 October International Friendly	Austria	5–0	Hungary	Vienna, Austria
15:00 (UTC+1:00)	Taurer 5'; Studnicka 10', 34', ?'; Huber ?'	Report		Stadium: WAC-Platz; Attendance: 500; Referee: Roland Shires (England)
Note: This was the first official international match played in continental Europe.

=== 1903 ===
5 April International Friendly	Hungary	2–1	Bohemia	Budapest, Hungary
15:30 (UTC+1:00)	Borbás 16'; Minder 78'	Report; Report2	Rezek 9'	Stadium: Millenáris Sporttelep; Attendance: 750; Referee: Béla Ordódy (Hungary)

11 June International Friendly	Hungary	3–2	Austria	Margaret Island, Hungary
15:00 (UTC+1:00)	Pokorny 24', 65'; Buda 52'	Report	Pulchert 60'; Studnicka 70'	Attendance: 700; Referee: Arthur Yolland (England)
Note: József Pokorny set the goal scoring record for Hungary (2 goals)

11 October International Friendly	Austria	4–2	Hungary	Vienna, Austria
15:30 (UTC+1:00)	Studnicka 24', 57', 72'; Huber 64'	Report	Borbás 18', 82'	Stadium: WAC-Platz; Attendance: 600; Referee: Geo Fuchs (Austria)
Note: Gáspár Borbás set the goal scoring record for Hungary (3 goals)

=== 1904 ===
2 June International Friendly	Hungary	3–0	Austria	Budapest, Hungary
17:30 (UTC+1:00)	Pokorny 25'; Koch 58'; Borbás 81'	Report		Stadium: Millenáris Sporttelep; Attendance: 800; Referee: Ferenc Horváth (Hungary)
Note: Gáspár Borbás set the goal scoring record for Hungary (4 goals)

9 October International Friendly	Austria	5–4	Hungary	Vienna, Austria
15:30 (UTC+1:00)	Stansfield 23', 53', 83', 84'; Bugno 27'	Report	Károly 4'; Pokorny 30' (pen.), 41'; Borbás 67'	Stadium: Cricketer Platz; Attendance: 2,000; Referee: Theodor Holley (Austria)

=== 1905 ===
9 April International Friendly	Hungary	0–0	Austria	Budapest, Hungary
16:00 (UTC+1:00)		Report		Stadium: Millenáris Sporttelep; Attendance: 6,500; Referee: Ede Herczog (Hungary)

=== 1906 ===
1 April International Friendly	Hungary	1–1	Bohemia	Budapest, Hungary
16:00 (UTC+1:00)	Károly 80'	Report	Valášek 56'	Stadium: Millenáris Sporttelep; Attendance: 5,000; Referee: Theodor Holley (Austria)

7 October International Friendly	Bohemia	4–4	Hungary	Prague, Kingdom of Bohemia
15:30 (UTC+1:00)	Starý 22', 83'; Baumruk 65'; Košek 88'	Report	Horváth 33', 86'; Károly 59'; Molnár 61'	Stadium: Stadion Slavii; Attendance: 6,000; Referee: Paul Heyne (Germany)

4 November International Friendly	Hungary	3–1	Austria	Budapest, Hungary
15:00 (UTC+1:00)	Molnár 26'; Schlosser 55'; Károly 65'	Report	Hussak 75' (pen.)	Stadium: Millenáris Sporttelep; Attendance: 3,000; Referee: Ákos Fehéry (Hungary)

=== 1907 ===
7 April International Friendly	Hungary	5–2	Bohemia	Budapest, Hungary
16:15 (UTC+1:00)	Horváth 21', 74', 85'; Borbás 57'; Molnár 82' (pen.)	Report	Pelikán 9'; Jelínek 29'	Stadium: Millenáris Sporttelep; Attendance: 1,000; Referee: Alfréd Hajós (Hungary)
Note: Gáspár Borbás set the goal scoring record for Hungary (6 goals). This match was also the heaviest defeat of the Bohemia football team at the time.

5 May International Friendly	Austria	3–1	Hungary	Rudolfsheim, Austria
16:00 (UTC+1:00)	Dünnmann 54'; Schediwy 62'; Wolf 86'	Report	Károly 87'	Stadium: Rapid Platz; Attendance: 2,000; Referee: Hugo Meisl (Hungary)

6 October International Friendly	Bohemia	5–3	Hungary	Prague, Kingdom of Bohemia
15:00 (UTC+1:00)	Košek 15', 35', 86'; Bělka 62', 88'	Report	Gorszky 4'; Szednicsek 16'; Weisz 25'	Stadium: Stadion Slavii; Attendance: 4,000; Referee: Josef Gruss (Bohemia)

3 November International Friendly	Hungary	4–1	Austria	Budapest, Hungary
15:00 (UTC+1:00)	Borbás 11', 37'; Vladar 18' (o.g.); Károly 47' (pen.)	Report	Dünnmann 80'	Stadium: Millenáris Sporttelep; Attendance: 7,000; Referee: Ákos Fehéry (Hungary)
Note: Gáspár Borbás set the goal scoring record for Hungary (8 goals).

=== 1908 ===
5 April 1908 International Friendly	Hungary	5–2	Bohemia	Budapest, Hungary
16:00 (UTC+1:00)	Schlosser 1', 73'; Károly 75', 86' (pen.)	Report	Bělka 48', 74'	Stadium: Millenáris Sporttelep; Attendance: 8,500; Referee: Theodor Holley (Austria)

3 May International Friendly	Austria	4–0	Hungary	Vienna, Austria
16:00 (UTC+1:00)	Andres 9'; Kubik 22'; Hussak 71'; Kohn 84'	Report		Stadium: Hohe Warte Stadium; Attendance: 3,500; Referee: Theodor Holley (Austria)

10 June International Friendly	Hungary	0–7	England	Budapest, Hungary
18:00 (UTC+1:00)		Report	Woodward 13'; Hilsdon 28', 48', 71', 88'; Windridge 30'; Rutherford 38'	Stadium: Millenáris Sporttelep; Attendance: 6,500; Referee: Hugo Meisl (Austria)

1 November International Friendly	Hungary	5–3	Austria	Budapest, Hungary
14:30 (UTC+1:00)	Kaltenbrunner 3' (o.g.); Krempels 17', 59'; Schlosser 44'; Koródy 70'	Report	Fischera 12', 79'; Studnicka 23'	Stadium: Millenáris Sporttelep; Attendance: 6,500; Referee: Heinrich Riso (Germany)

=== 1909 ===
4 April International Friendly	Hungary	3–3	Germany	Budapest, Hungary
16:00 (UTC+1:00)	Borbás 4'; Schlosser 28'; Sebestyén 60'	Report	Worpitzky 5', 33'; Ugi 79' (pen.)	Stadium: Millenáris Sporttelep; Attendance: 9,000; Referee: Hugo Meisl (Austria)

2 May International Friendly	Austria	3–4	Hungary	Vienna, Austria
16:30 (UTC+1:00)	Neubauer 9', 57'; Schmieger 20'	Report	Schlosser 35', 54' (pen.), 73' (pen.); Bíró 37'	Stadium: Cricketer Platz; Attendance: 1,400; Referee: Paul Neumann (Germany)

29 May International Friendly	Hungary	2–4	England	Budapest, Hungary
17:30 (UTC+1:00)	Késmárky 44'; Grósz 72'	Report	Bridgett 5'; Woodward 39'; Fleming 42'; Weinber 79' (o.g.)	Stadium: Millenáris Sporttelep; Attendance: 10,000; Referee: Christiaan Groothoff (Netherlands)

30 May International Friendly	Hungary	1–1	Austria	Budapest, Hungary
17:30 (UTC+1:00)	Borbás 2'	Report	Schrenk 17'	Stadium: Millenáris Sporttelep; Attendance: 11,000; Referee: George Simmons (England)
Note: Gáspár Borbás set the goal scoring record for Hungary (10 goals).

31 May International Friendly	Hungary	2–8	England	Budapest, Hungary
15:00 (UTC+1:00)	Schlosser 47'; Mészáros 78'	Report	Fleming 3', 44'; Woodward 12' (36); Holley 17', 89'	Stadium: Millenáris Sporttelep; Attendance: 3,000; Referee: Ferenc Schubert (Hungary)

7 November International Friendly	Hungary	2–2	Austria	Budapest, Hungary
14:30 (UTC+1:00)	Schlosser 6', 48'	Report	Schmieger 5', 62'	Stadium: Millenáris Sporttelep; Attendance: 10,000; Referee: Paul Neumann (Germany)
Note: Imre Schlosser set the goal scoring record for Hungary (11 goals).

=== 1910 ===
1 May International Friendly	Austria	2–1	Hungary	Vienna, Austria
16:30 (UTC+1:00)	Fischera 2'; Hussak 33'	Report	Dobó 8'	Stadium: Hohe Warte Stadium; Attendance: 7,000; Referee: Max Brandt (Germany)

26 May International Friendly	Hungary	6–1	Italy	Budapest, Hungary
17:00 (UTC+1:00)	Schlosser 28', 48'; Weisz 32'; Károly 69', 75'; Dobó 74'	Report	Rizzi 88'	Stadium: Millenáris Sporttelep; Attendance: 11,000; Referee: Edgar Blüher (Germany)
Note: Imre Schlosser set the goal scoring record for Hungary (13 goals).

6 November International Friendly	Hungary	3–0	Austria	Budapest, Hungary
14:30 (UTC+1:00)	Koródy 27', 77'; Bodnár 82'	Report		Stadium: Millenáris Sporttelep; Attendance: 11,000; Referee: Edgar Blüher (Germany)

=== 1911 ===
1 January International Friendly	France	0–3	Hungary	Maisons-Alfort, France
15:00 (UTC+1:00)		Report	Schlosser 10', 30', 49'	Stadium: Stade Charentonneau; Attendance: 2,032; Referee: Charles Barette (Belgium)
Note: Imre Schlosser set the goal scoring record for Hungary (16 goals).

6 January International Friendly	Italy	0–1	Hungary	Milan, Italy
14:30 (UTC+1:00)		Report	Schlosser 22'	Stadium: Arena Civica; Attendance: 4,500; Referee: Henry Goodley (Italy)

8 January International Friendly	Switzerland	2–0	Hungary	Zürich, Switzerland
15:00 (UTC+1:00)	Collet 54'; Wyss 71'	Report		Stadium: Vélodrome Hardau; Attendance: 3,000; Referee: Patrick Devitte (Switzerland)

7 May International Friendly	Austria	3–1	Hungary	Vienna, Austria
16:00 (UTC+1:00)	Hussak 36'; Merz 38', 79'	Report	Bodnár 20'	Stadium: Hohe Warte Stadium; Attendance: 7,000; Referee: Hubert Istace (Belgium)

29 October International Friendly	Hungary	9–0	Switzerland	Budapest, Hungary
15:00 (UTC+1:00)	Bíró 1'; Koródy 5', 26'; Schlosser 18', 56', 62', 79', 83', 85'	Report		Stadium: Millenáris Sporttelep; Attendance: 15,000; Referee: Hugo Meisl (Austria)
Note: Imre Schlosser set the goal scoring record for Hungary (23 goals). This match was also the biggest victory of the Hungary football team at the time.

5 November Wagner Trophy	Hungary	2–0	Austria	Budapest, Hungary
14:30 (UTC+1:00)	Bodnár 30' (pen.); Koródy 53'	Report		Stadium: Üllői úti stadion Attendance: 25,000; Referee: Patrick Devitte (Switzerland)

17 December 1911 International Friendly	Germany	1–4	Hungary	Munich, Germany
14:00 (UTC+1:00)	Worpitzky 48'	Report	Sebestyén 24'; Schlosser 43', 74'; Bodnár 66'	Stadium: Männer-Turn-Verein; Attendance: 8,000; Referee: Hugo Meisl (Austria)
Note: Imre Schlosser set the goal scoring record for Hungary (25 goals). This match was also the biggest victory of the Hungary football team at the time.

=== 1912 ===
14 April International Friendly	Hungary	4–4	Germany	Budapest, Hungary
16:00 (UTC+1:00)	Schlosser 9'; Bodnár 59', 65', 75'	Report	Möller 15'; Kipp 17'; Worpitzky 25'; Jäger 44' (pen.)	Stadium: Üllői úti stadion Attendance: 25,000; Referee: Hugo Meisl (Austria)

5 May Wagner Trophy	Austria	1–1	Hungary	Vienna, Austria
16:00 (UTC+1:00)	Fischera 87'	Report	Bodnár 20'	Stadium: Hohe Warte Stadium; Attendance: 11,000; Referee: Jack Howcroft (England)

20 June International Friendly	Sweden	2–2	Hungary	Gothenburg, Sweden
19:45 (UTC+1:00)	Bodnár 37'; Pataki 58'	Report	Bergström 8'; Svensson 46'	Stadium: Walhalla Idrottsplats; Attendance: 2,300; Referee: Albert Meerum Terwogt (Netherlands)

23 June International Friendly	Norway	0–6	Hungary	Oslo, Norway
19:30 (UTC+1:00)	Schlosser 10', 89'; Bodnár 49', 71', 73'; Tóth 31'	Report		Stadium: Kristiania; Attendance: 4,000; Referee: Ruben Gelbord (Sweden)
Note: Imre Schlosser set the European goal scoring record (28 goals).

30 June 1912 Olympics first round	Great Britain	7–0	Hungary	Stockholm
13:30 (UTC+1:00)	Walden 21', 23', 49', 53', 55', 85'; Woodward 45'	Report		Stadium: Tranebergs Idrottsplats; Attendance: 8,000; Referee: Christiaan Groothoff (Netherlands)

3 July 1912 Olympics consolation tournament semi final	Hungary	3–1	Germany	Stockholm
15:00 (UTC+1:00)	Schlosser 3', 39', 82'	Report	Förderer 56'	Stadium: Tranebergs Idrottsplats; Attendance: 2,000; Referee: Christiaan Groothoff (Netherlands)
Note: Imre Schlosser set the European goal scoring record (31 goals).

5 July 1912 Olympics Consolation Tournament Final	Austria	0–3	Hungary	Stockholm, Sweden
15:00 (UTC+1:00)		Report	Schlosser 32'; Pataki 72'; Bodnár 73'	Stadium: Råsunda IP; Attendance: 5,000; Referee: Herbert Willing (Netherlands)

12 July International Friendly	Russia	0–9	Hungary	Moscow, Russia
17:00 (+2:30)	Pataki 9', 44', 49', 75' (pen.); Schlosser 40', 58'; Kertész 47', 54', 84'	Report		Stadium: Sokolniki Pitch; Attendance: 3,000; Referee: George Bayness (Russia)
Note: Imre Schlosser set the European goal scoring record (34 goals).

14 July International Friendly	Russia	0–12	Hungary	Moscow, Russia
17:00 (+2:30)	Kertész 17', 36', 64'; Schlosser 39', 50', 69', 71', 90'; Pataki 65', 73'; Tóth 79'; Bródy 86'	Report		Stadium: Sokolniki Pitch; Attendance: 3,000; Referee: Alexander Schultz (Russia)
Note: Imre Schlosser set the European goal scoring record (39 goals).

3 November Wagner Trophy	Hungary	4–0	Austria	Budapest, Hungary
15:00 (UTC+1:00)	Schlosser 21', 80'; Bodnár 34'; Pataki 65'	Report		Stadium: Üllői úti stadion Attendance: 30,000; Referee: Jack Howcroft (England)
Note: Imre Schlosser set the European goal scoring record (41 goals).

=== 1913 ===
27 April Wagner Trophy	Austria	1–4	Hungary	Vienna, Austria
16:00 (UTC+1:00)	Studnicka 62'	Report	Tóth 25'; Bíró 71'; Pataki 75', 77'	Stadium: Prater Sportplatz; Attendance: 20,000; Referee: John Howcroft (England)

18 May International Friendly	Hungary	2–0	Sweden	Budapest, Hungary
17:00 (UTC+1:00)	Pataki 87'; Schlosser 89'	Report		Stadium: Üllői úti stadion Attendance: 21,000; Referee: Heinrich Retschury (Austria)
Note: Imre Schlosser set the European goal scoring record (42 goals).

26 October Wagner Trophy	Hungary	4–3	Austria	Budapest, Hungary
14:30 (UTC+1:00)	Kertész 4', 25'; Hlavay 40'; Pataki 68'	Report	Schwarz 28'; Merz 80'; Dittrich 84' (pen.)	Stadium: Hungária körúti stadion Attendance: 32,000; Referee: James Schumacher (England)

=== 1914 ===
3 May Wagner Trophy	Austria	2–0	Hungary	Vienna, Austria
15:00 (UTC+1:00)	Fischera 19', 34'	Report		Stadium: Prater Sportplatz; Attendance: 19,627; Referee: Albert Meerum-Terwogt (Netherlands)

31 May Wagner Trophy	Hungary	5–1	France	Budapest, Hungary
17:30 (UTC+1:00)	Bodnár 20', 81', 87'; Payer 59' (pen.); Pataki 76'	Report	Brouzes 1'	Stadium: Hungária körúti stadion Attendance: 14,000; Referee: Heinrich Retschury (Austria)

19 June International Friendly	Sweden	1–5	Hungary	Solna, Sweden
19:45 (UTC+1:00)	Ansen ?'	Report	Payer 21'; Tóth 25'; Borisz 44'; Rácz 60'; Schlosser 87'	Stadium: Råsunda IP; Attendance: 6,000; Referee: Albert Meerum Terwogt (Netherlands)
Note: Imre Schlosser set the European goal scoring record (43 goals).

21 June International Friendly	Sweden	1–1	Hungary	Solna, Sweden
19:45 (UTC+1:00)	Schlosser 30'	Report	Börjesson 50'	Stadium: Råsunda IP; Attendance: 5,000; Referee: Albert Meerum Terwogt (Netherlands)

4 October International Friendly	Hungary	2–2	Austria	Budapest, Hungary
15:00 (UTC+1:00)	Pótz-Nagy 54'; Schlosser 72'	Report	Studnicka 36'; Swatosch 45'	Stadium: Üllői úti stadion Attendance: 12,000; Referee: Ákos Fehéry (Hungary)
Note: Imre Schlosser set the European goal scoring record (45 goals).

8 November International Friendly	Austria	1–2	Hungary	Vienna, Austria
14:30 (UTC+1:00)	Kuthan 68'	Report	Konrád 59'; Bodnár 87'	Stadium: Prater Sportplatz; Attendance: 5,000; Referee: Wilhelm Schmieger (Austria)

=== 1915 ===
2 May International Friendly	Hungary	2–5	Austria	Budapest, Hungary
16:30 (UTC+1:00)	Prohazka 44' (o.g.); Pataki 71'	Report	Studnicka 26', 46'; Kuthan 36'; Hoel 55'; Ehrlich 87'	Stadium: Hungária körúti stadion Attendance: 16,000; Referee: Ferenc Schubert (Hungary)

30 May International Friendly	Austria	1–2	Hungary	Vienna, Austria
16:30 (UTC+1:00)	Swatosch 80'	Report	Schlosser 5'; Borbás 22'	Stadium: Prater Sportplatz; Attendance: 8,000; Referee: Wilhelm Schmieger (Austria)

3 October International Friendly	Austria	4–2	Hungary	Vienna, Austria
15:00 (UTC+1:00)	Heinzl 20', 26'; Bauer 65', 85'	Report	Schlosser 14'; Kertész 52'	Stadium: Prater Sportplatz; Attendance: 1,200; Referee: Heinrich Retschury (Austria)
Note: Imre Schlosser set the European goal scoring record (47 goals).

7 November International Friendly	Hungary	6–2	Austria	Budapest, Hungary
14:30 (UTC+1:00)	Kraupar 7' (o.g.); Schaffer 21', 75', 90'; Tóth 58', 76'	Report	Hoel 25'; Studnicka 80'	Stadium: Hungária körúti stadion Attendance: 16,000; Referee: Aladár Oláh (Hungary)

=== 1916 ===
7 May International Friendly	Austria	3–1	Hungary	Vienna, Austria
15:30 (UTC+1:00)	Bauer 62', 70'; Studnicka 76'	Report	Kertész 58'	Stadium: Prater Sportplatz; Attendance: 8,000; Referee: Wilhelm Schmieger (Austria)

4 June International Friendly	Hungary	2–1	Austria	Budapest, Hungary
16:30 (UTC+1:00)	Schaffer 11'; Schlosser 25'	Report	Bauer 27'	Stadium: Hungária körúti stadion Attendance: 16,000; Referee: Aladár Oláh (Hungary)
Note: Imre Schlosser set the European goal scoring record (48 goals).

1 October International Friendly	Hungary	2–3	Austria	Budapest, Hungary
14:30 (UTC+1:00)	Schaffer 11'; Tóth 21'	Report	Bauer 2', 30'; Grundwald 15'	Stadium: Üllői úti stadion Attendance: 16,000; Referee: Imre Vértes (Hungary)

5 November International Friendly	Austria	3–3	Hungary	Vienna, Austria
15:30 (UTC+1:00)	Bauer 17', 52'; Kraus 25'	Report	Schlosser 22'; Konrád 45'; Schaffer 56'	Stadium: Prater Sportplatz; Attendance: 7,000; Referee: Max Seemann (Austria)

=== 1917 ===
6 May International Friendly	Austria	1–1	Hungary	Vienna, Austria
16:30 (UTC+2:00)	Heinzl 45'	Report	Schlosser 18'	Stadium: Prater Sportplatz; Attendance: 4,000; Referee: Wilhelm Schmieger (Austria)
Note: Imre Schlosser set the European goal scoring record (50 goals).

3 June International Friendly	Hungary	6–2	Austria	Budapest, Hungary
16:30 (UTC+2:00)	Urik 13'; Schaffer 16', 63'; Schlosser 40', 45'; Weisz 41'	Report	Heinzl 9'; Popovic 76'	Stadium: Hungária körúti stadion Attendance: 22,000; Referee: Karl Winkler (Germany)
Note: Imre Schlosser set the European goal scoring record (52 goals).

15 July International Friendly	Austria	1–4	Hungary	Vienna, Austria
17:00 (UTC+2:00)	Prousek 50'	Report	Schaffer 39', 73', 77'; Schlosser 55'	Stadium: Prater Sportplatz; Attendance: 4,000; Referee: Rudolf Pohl (Germany)

7 October International Friendly	Hungary	2–1	Austria	Budapest, Hungary
15:00 (UTC+1:00)	Schaffer 40'; Taussig 52'	Report	Sedláček 67'	Stadium: Üllői úti stadion Attendance: 20,000; Referee: Erich Chemnitz (Germany)

4 November International Friendly	Austria	1–2	Hungary	Vienna, Austria
14:30 (UTC+1:00)	Wilda 61'	Report	Schaffer 12', 33'	Stadium: Prater Sportplatz; Attendance: 12,000; Referee: Kurt Von Paquet (Germany)

=== 1918 ===
14 April International Friendly	Hungary	2–0	Austria	Budapest, Hungary
16:30 (UTC+2:00)	Schlosser 26'; Schaffer 52' (pen.)	Report		Stadium: Hungária körúti stadion Attendance: 20,000; Referee: Angelo Rossi (Germany)
Note: Imre Schlosser set the European goal scoring record (54 goals).

12 May International Friendly	Hungary	2–1	Switzerland	Budapest, Hungary
17:00 (UTC+2:00)	Schaffer 57'; Schlosser 77'	Report	Keller 51'	Stadium: Hungária körúti stadion Attendance: 2,000; Referee: John Forster (Switzerland)

2 June International Friendly	Austria	0–2	Hungary	Vienna, Austria
16:30 (UTC+2:00)		Report	Schlosser 70'; Schaffer 73'	Stadium: Prater Sportplatz; Attendance: 15,000; Referee: Angelo Rossi (Germany)
Note: Imre Schlosser set the European goal scoring record (56 goals).

6 October International Friendly	Austria	0–3	Hungary	Vienna, Austria
15:30 (UTC+1:00)		Report	Payer 5' (pen.), 63' (pen.); Pataki 77'	Stadium: Prater Sportplatz; Attendance: 15,000; Referee: Otto Kehm (Germany)

=== 1919 ===
6 April International Friendly	Hungary	2–1	Austria	Budapest, Hungary
16:00 (UTC+1:00)	Orth 45'; Braun 80'	Report	Wondrak 22'	Stadium: Üllői úti stadion Attendance: 35,000; Referee: Hugó Szüsz (Hungary)

5 October International Friendly	Austria	2–0	Hungary	Vienna, Austria
15:30 (UTC+1:00)	Bauer 40'; Uridil 44'	Report		Stadium: Prater Sportplatz; Attendance: 22,000; Referee: Heinrich Retschury (Austria)

9 November International Friendly	Hungary	3–2	Austria	Budapest, Hungary
15:00 (UTC+1:00)	Pataki 7', 29' (pen.); Orth 27'	Report	Hansl 58'; Tremmel 79'	Stadium: Hungária körúti stadion Attendance: 27,000; Referee: Hugó Szüsz (Hungary)

=== 1920 ===
2 May 1920 Friendly	Austria	2–2	Hungary	Vienna, Austria
17:00 (UTC+2:00)	Wieser 43' (pen.); Swatosch 66'	Report	István Tóth 37'; Pataki 44'	Stadium: Prater Sportplatz; Attendance: 20,000; Referee: Willy Schmieger (Austria)

24 October 1920 Friendly	Germany	1–0	Hungary	Berlin, Germany
15:30 (UTC+1:00)	Jäger 22' (pen.)	Report		Stadium: Deutsches Stadion; Attendance: 55,000; Referee: Jacques Hirrlé (Switzerland)

7 November 1920 Friendly	Hungary	1–2	Austria	Budapest, Hungary
14:45 (UTC+1:00)	Braun 59'	Report	Kuthan 24'; Swatosch 43'	Stadium: Hungária körúti stadion Attendance: 30,000; Referee: Christiaan Groothoff (Netherlands)

=== 1921 ===
24 April 1921 Friendly	Austria	4–1	Hungary	Dresden, Germany
16:30 (UTC+1:00)	Popp 7'; Träg 14'; Seiderer 58'	Report	Kuthan 33' (pen.); Wondrak 68'; Uridil 70'	Stadium: Stadion am Ostragehege; Attendance: 20,000; Referee: Willem Eijmers (Netherlands)

5 June 1921 Friendly	Hungary	3–0	Germany	Budapest, Hungary
17:30 (UTC+1:00)	Schlosser 10'; Guttmann 29'; Braun 47'	Report		Stadium: MTK-Stadion; Attendance: 30,000; Referee: Heinrich Retschury (Austria)

6 November 1921 Friendly	Hungary	4–2	Sweden	Budapest, Hungary
14:30 (UTC+1:00)	Orth 15', 49', 54'; Schlosser 72'	Report	Carlsson 70' (pen.), 87'	Stadium: Üllői úti stadion Attendance: 34,000; Referee: Willem Boas (Netherlands)

18 December 1921 Friendly	Hungary	1–0	Poland	Budapest, Hungary
13:45 (UTC+1:00)	Szabó 18'	Report		Stadium: Hungária körúti stadion Attendance: 8,000; Referee: Karl Grätz (Czechoslovakia)

=== 1922 ===
30 April 1922 Friendly	Hungary	1–1	Austria	Budapest, Hungary
16:45 (UTC+1:00)	Jiszda 41'; Molnár 51'	Report		Stadium: Hungária körúti stadion Attendance: 30,000; Referee: Peco Bauwens (Germany)

14 May 1922 Friendly	Poland	0–3	Hungary	Kraków, Poland
17:15 (UTC+1:00)		Report	Seiden 6'; Solti 44', 81'	Stadium: Stadion Cracovii; Attendance: 16,000; Referee: Karl Grätz (Czechoslovakia)

15 June 1922 Friendly	Hungary	1–1	Switzerland	Budapest, Hungary
18:00 (UTC+1:00)	Blum 63'	Report	Merkt 19'	Stadium: Üllői úti stadion Attendance: 15,000; Referee: Heinrich Retschury (Austria)

2 July 1922 Friendly	Germany	0–0	Hungary	Bochum, Germany
17:00 (UTC+1:00)		Report		Stadium: Stadion an der Castroper Straße; Attendance: 35,000; Referee: Heinrich Retschury (Austria)

9 July 1922 Friendly	Sweden	1–1	Hungary	Solna, Sweden
14:00 (UTC+1:00)	Börjesson 43'	Report	Hirzer 77'	Stadium: Råsunda Stadium; Attendance: 14,000; Referee: Per Andersen (Norway)

13 July 1922 Friendly	Finland	1–5	Hungary	Helsinki, Finland
18:30 (UTC+2:00)	Kelin 56'	Report	Schwarz 22', 83'; Fogl 64'; Pataki 69', 81'	Stadium: Töölön Pallokenttä; Attendance: 5,000; Referee: Artur Björklund (Sweden)

24 September 1922 Friendly	Austria	2–2	Hungary	Vienna, Austria
15:30 (UTC+1:00)	Kuthan 17'; Wesely 80'	Report	Priboj 22', 71'	Stadium: Hohe Warte Stadium; Attendance: 65,000; Referee: Peco Bauwens (Germany)

26 November 1922 Friendly	Hungary	1–2	Austria	Budapest, Hungary
14:00 (UTC+1:00)	Molnár 21'	Report	Swatosch 61'; Kowanda 67'	Stadium: Üllői úti stadion Attendance: 30,000; Referee: Carl Koppehel (Germany)

=== 1923 ===
4 March 1923 Friendly	Italy	0–0	Hungary	Genoa, Italy
15:00 (UTC+1:00)		Report		Stadium: stadio comunale Attendance: 20,000; Referee: John Forster (Switzerland)

11 March 1923 Friendly	Switzerland	1–6	Hungary	Lausanne, Switzerland
15:00 (UTC+1:00)	Abegglen 75'	Report	Molnár 4', 57'; Orth 55', 77'; Hirzer 63', 65'	Stadium: Stade olympique de la Pontaise; Attendance: 15,000; Referee: Job Mutters (Netherlands)

6 May 1923 Friendly	Austria	1–0	Hungary	Vienna, Austria
16:30 (UTC+1:00)	Swatosch 79'	Report		Stadium: Hohe Warte Stadium; Attendance: 40,000; Referee: Emil Grätz (Czechoslovakia)

19 August 1923 Friendly	Hungary	3–1	Finland	Budapest, Hungary
17:00 (UTC+1:00)	Braun 50' (pen.), 53'; Hirzer 86'	Report	Linna 37'	Stadium: Üllői úti stadion Attendance: 16,000; Referee: Max Seemann (Austria)

23 September 1923 Friendly	Hungary	2–0	Austria	Budapest, Hungary
15:45 (UTC+1:00)	Molnár 69' (pen.); Csontos 72'	Report		Stadium: Hungária körúti stadion Attendance: 38,000; Referee: Emil Grätz (Czechoslovakia)

28 October 1923 Friendly	Hungary	2–1	Sweden	Budapest, Hungary
15:00 (UTC+1:00)	Eisenhoffer 11', 36'	Report	Detter 2'	Stadium: Üllői úti stadion Attendance: 35,000; Referee: Willy Schmieger (Austria)

=== 1924 ===
6 April 1924 Friendly	Hungary	7–1	Italy	Budapest, Hungary
16:30 (UTC+1:00)	Braun 17', 42' (pen.); Eisenhoffer 49'; Molnár 59', 60', 69'; Opata 70'	Report	Cevenini 76' (pen.)	Stadium: Hungária körúti stadion Attendance: 35,000; Referee: Max Seemann (Austria)

4 May 1924 Friendly	Hungary	2–2	Austria	Budapest, Hungary
17:00 (UTC+1:00)	Eisenhoffer 5', 64'	Report	Horvath 48'; Wieser 88'	Stadium: Hungária körúti stadion Attendance: 40,000; Referee: Arthur Björklund (Sweden)

18 May 1924 Friendly	Switzerland	4–2	Hungary	Zürich, Switzerland
15:00 (UTC+1:00)	Abegglen 20'; Sturzenegger 32', 54'; Dietrich 47'	Report	Braun 66' (pen.); Opata 72'	Stadium: Sportplatz Förrlibuck; Attendance: 18,000; Referee: John Fowler (England)

26 May 1924 1924 Summer Olympics	Hungary	5–0	Poland	Paris, France
17:00	Eisenhoffer 14'; Hirzer 51', 58'; Opata 70', 87'	Report		Stadium: Stade Bergeyre; Attendance: 3,578; Referee: Johannes Mutters (Netherlands)

29 May 1924 1924 Summer Olympics	Egypt	3–0	Hungary	Paris, France
17:00	Yakan 4', 58'; Hegazi 40'	Report		Stadium: Stade de Paris; Attendance: 4,371; Referee: Luis Collina (Spain)

4 June 1924 Friendly	France	0–1	Hungary	Le Havre, France
17:30 (UTC+1:00)		Report	Eisenhoffer 25'	Stadium: Stade de la Cavée Verte; Attendance: 5,000; Referee: Félix Herren (Switzerland)

31 August 1924 Friendly	Hungary	4–0	Poland	Budapest, Hungary
16:30 (UTC+1:00)	Karasiak 31'; Takács 38', 40'; Orth 59'	Report		Stadium: Üllői úti stadion Attendance: 25,000; Referee: Heinrich Plhak (Austria)

14 September 1924 Friendly	Austria	2–1	Hungary	Vienna, Austria
15:30 (UTC+1:00)	Horvath 40'; Wesely 87'	Report	Orth 45'	Stadium: Hohe Warte Stadium; Attendance: 45,000; Referee: Charles Barette (Belgium)

21 September 1924 Friendly	Hungary	4–1	Germany	Budapest, Hungary
16:00 (UTC+1:00)	Szentmiklóssy 33'; Lang 42' (o.g.); Takács 49', 64'	Report	Harder 56'	Stadium: Ferencváros-Stadion; Attendance: 35,000; Referee: Heinrich Retschury (Austria)

=== 1925 ===
18 January 1925 Friendly	Italy	1–2	Hungary	Milan, Italy
14:30 (UTC+1:00)	Conti 17'	Report	Spitz 27'; Takács 76'	Stadium: Campo di viale Lombardia; Attendance: 18,000; Referee: Marcel Slawik (France)

25 March 1925 Friendly	Hungary	5–0	Switzerland	Budapest, Hungary
15:30 (UTC+1:00)	Takács 14'; Molnár 43', 79' (pen.); Jeny 84', 87'	Report		Stadium: Hungária körúti stadion Attendance: 40,000; Referee: Ernest Fabris (Yugoslavia)

5 May 1925 Friendly	Austria	3–1	Hungary	Vienna, Austria
17:30 (UTC+1:00)	Häusler 31'; Haftl 38', 88'	Report	Takács 24'	Stadium: Hohe Warte Stadium; Attendance: 43,000; Referee: František Cejnar (Czechoslovakia)

21 May 1925 Friendly	Hungary	1–3	Belgium	Budapest, Hungary
17:30 (UTC+1:00)	Jeny 87'	Report	Houet 37'; Adams 65'; Thys 81'	Stadium: Hungária körúti stadion Attendance: 25,000; Referee: Jacques Hirrlé (Switzerland)

12 July 1925 Friendly	Sweden	6–2	Hungary	Stockholm, Sweden
15:00 (UTC+1:00)	Johansson 3', 27', 50'; Rydell 19', 78'; Kaufeldt 84'	Report	Takács 51', 71'	Stadium: Olympic Stadium; Attendance: 17,000; Referee: Sophus Hansen (Denmark)

19 July 1925 Friendly	Poland	0–2	Hungary	Kraków, Poland
17:30 (UTC+1:00)	Winkler 59'; Holzbauer 78'	Report		Stadium: Stadion Wisły; Attendance: 8,000; Referee: Eugen Braun (Austria)

20 September 1925 Friendly	Hungary	1–1	Austria	Budapest, Hungary
16:00 (UTC+1:00)	Priboj 36'	Report	Buza 49' (pen.)	Stadium: Üllői úti stadion Attendance: 33,000; Referee: Karel Herites (Czechoslovakia)

4 October 1925 Friendly	Hungary	0–1	Spain	Budapest, Hungary
15:30 (UTC+1:00)		Report	Carmelo 52'	Stadium: Üllői úti stadion Attendance: 34,830; Referee: Eugen Braun (Austria)

11 October 1925 Friendly	Czechoslovakia	2–0	Hungary	Prague, Czechoslovakia
15:30 (UTC+1:00)	Perner 49'; Dvořáček 78'	Report		Stadium: Stadion Letná; Attendance: 3,000; Referee: Heinrich Retschury (Austria)

8 November 1925 Friendly	Hungary	1–1	Italy	Budapest, Hungary
14:30 (UTC+1:00)	Della Valle 51'	Report	Molnár 76' (pen.)	Stadium: Üllői úti stadion Attendance: 20,000; Referee: Marcel Slawik (France)

=== 1926 ===
14 February 1926 Friendly	Belgium	0–2	Hungary	Budapest, Hungary
14:30		Report	Pipa 51'; Rémay 77'	Stadium: Üllői úti stadion Attendance: 25,000; Referee: Job Mutters (Netherlands)

2 May 1926 Friendly	Hungary	0–3	Austria	Budapest, Hungary
17:00 (UTC+1:00)		Report	Eckl 7'; Hanel 43'; Cutti 54'	Stadium: Hungária körúti stadion Attendance: 35,000; Referee: Karel Herites (Czechoslovakia)

6 June 1926 Friendly	Hungary	2–1	Czechoslovakia	Budapest, Hungary
17:00 (UTC+1:00)	Takács 31'; Kohut 66'	Report	Silný 38'	Stadium: Üllői úti stadion Attendance: 27,000; Referee: Giovanni Mauro (Italy)

20 August 1926 Friendly	Hungary	4–1	Poland	Budapest, Hungary
17:00 (UTC+1:00)	Kautzky 9'; Horváth 31'; Fogl 42'; Senkey 61'	Report	Staliński 48'	Stadium: Üllői úti stadion Attendance: 9,000; Referee: Ernest Fabris (Yugoslavia)

19 September 1926 Friendly	Austria	2–3	Hungary	Vienna, Austria
16:00 (UTC+1:00)	Wesely 55'; Höss 56'	Report	Holzbauer 2'; Jeszmás 62'; Kohut 83'	Stadium: Hohe Warte Stadium; Attendance: 40,000; Referee: Ladislav Štépanovský (Czechoslovakia)

14 November 1926 Friendly	Hungary	3–1	Sweden	Budapest, Hungary
14:00 (UTC+1:00)	Braun 4'; Opata 30'; Kohut 67'	Report	Svensson 85'	Stadium: Üllői úti stadion Attendance: 26,000; Referee: Eugen Braun (Austria)

19 December 1926 Friendly	Spain	4–2	Poland	Vigo, Spain
15:00	Errazquin 12', 87'; Goiburu 17'; Carmelo 66'	Report	36' Opata; 84' Braun	Stadium: Campo de Coia; Attendance: 15,000; Referee: Albert Prince-Cox (England)

26 December 1926 Friendly	Portugal	3–3	Hungary	Porto, Portugal
	João Santos 40'; Severo Tiago 49'; José Martins 60'	Report	Holzbauer 9', 74'; Braun 22'	Stadium: Campo do Ameal; Attendance: 10,000; Referee: José Llovera (Spain)

=== 1927 ===
10 April 1927 Friendly	Austria	6–0	Hungary	Vienna, Austria
16:00 (UTC+1:00)	Jiszda 26', 32'; Rappan 29'; Blum 42' (pen.); Wesely 54'; Horvath 84'	Report		Stadium: Hohe Warte Stadium; Attendance: 42,000; Referee: František Cejnar (Czechoslovakia)

10 April 1927 Friendly	Hungary	3–0	Yugoslavia	Budapest, Hungary
16:00 (UTC+1:00)	Siklóssy 24'; Orth 34'; Szabó 90'	Report		Stadium: Üllői úti stadion Attendance: 6,000; Referee: Heinrich Retschury (Austria)

24 April 1927 Friendly	Czechoslovakia	4–1	Hungary	Prague, Czechoslovakia
17:30 (UTC+1:00)	Puč 17'; Steiner 25' (pen.); Svoboda 37'; Silný 50'	Report	Mészáros 42'	Stadium: Stadion Slavii; Attendance: 20,000; Referee: Julius Zwicker (Austria)

12 June 1927 Friendly	Hungary	13–1	France	Budapest, Hungary
17:30 (UTC+1:00)	Takács 17', 41', 51', 60', 83', 85'; Orth 25', 26'; Skvarek 30', 88'; Kohut 32', 62'; Dewaquez 78' (o.g.)	Report	Dewaquez 80'	Stadium: Üllői úti stadion Attendance: 28,000; Referee: Heinrich Retschury (Austria)

25 September 1927 1927–30 Central European Cup	Hungary	5–3	Austria	Budapest, Hungary
15:30 (UTC+1:00)	Takács 18'; Kohut 27'; Ströck 51'; Holzbauer 62'; Hirzer 67'	Report	Wesely 11', 84'; Sigl 13'	Stadium: Üllői úti stadion Attendance: 38,000; Referee: Albert Prince-Cox (England)

25 September 1927 Friendly	Yugoslavia	5–1	Hungary	Zagreb, Yugoslavia
16:00 (UTC+1:00)	Marjanović 37'; Cindrić ?', ?'; Benčić ?'; Bonačić ?'	Report; Report2	Víg 86'	Stadium: Stadionul Concordia; Attendance: 6,000; Referee: Heinrich Retschury (Austria)

9 October 1927 Friendly	Hungary	1–2	Czechoslovakia	Budapest, Hungary
15:00 (+1:00)	Kohut 31'	Report	Podrazil 45'; Silný 49'	Stadium: Hungária körúti stadion Attendance: 40,000; Referee: Eugen Braun (Austria)

=== 1928 ===
25 March 1928 1927–30 Central European Cup	Italy	4–3	Hungary	Rome, Kingdom of Italy
15:00 (+1:00)	Conti 48', 75'; Rossetti 58'; Libonatti 85'	Report	Kohut 13'; Hirzer 44'; Takács 77'	Stadium: Stadio Nazionale PNF; Attendance: 25,000; Referee: Peco Bauwens (Germany)

25 March 1928 Friendly	Hungary	2–1	Yugoslavia	Budapest, Hungary
16:00 (+1:00)	Stofián 32', 34'	Report	Marjanović 4'	Stadium: Üllői úti stadion Attendance: 10,000; Referee: Alfred Preßler (Austria)

22 April 1928 1927–30 Central European Cup	Hungary	2–0	Czechoslovakia	Budapest, Hungary
16:30 (+1:00)	Hirzer 18' (pen.); Kohut 76'	Report		Stadium: Üllői úti stadion Attendance: 38,000; Referee: Raphaël van Praag (Belgium)

6 May 1928 Friendly	Hungary	5–5	Austria	Budapest, Hungary
16:30 (+1:00)	Kohut 2', 27', 43'; Hirzer 16' (pen.); Ströck 50'	Report	Weselik 23', 37', 52'; Kirbes 82'; Wesely 90' (pen.)	Stadium: Hungária körúti stadion Attendance: 33,000; Referee: Augustin Krist (Czechoslvakia)

7 October 1928 1927–30 Central European Cup	Austria	5–1	Hungary	Vienna, Austria
15:30 (+1:00	Sigl 11', 27'; Weselik 55'; Wesely 62'; Gschweidl 75'	Report	Hirzer 38'	Stadium: Hohe Warte Stadium; Attendance: 40,000; Referee: Alfred Birlem (Germany)

1 November 1928 1927–30 Central European Cup	Hungary	3–1	Switzerland	Budapest, Hungary
14:30 (+1:00)	Turay 36'; Hirzer 49'; Ströck 53'	Report	Weiler 78' (pen.)	Stadium: Üllői úti stadion Attendance: 20,000; Referee: Albino Carraro (Italy)

=== 1929 ===
24 February 1929 Friendly	France	3–0	Austria	Colombes, France
14:30	Banide 23'; Nicolas 25'; Lieb 33' (pen.)	Report		Stadium: Stade Yves-du-Manoir; Attendance: 20,000; Referee: Paul Ruoff (Switzerland)

14 April 1929 1927–30 Central European Cup	Switzerland	4–5	Hungary	Bern, Switzerland
15:00 (+1:00)	Weiler 2'; A. Abegglen 26', 66'; M. Abegglen 78'	Report	Widmer 8' (o.g.); Takács 51', 76'; Toldi 56'; Hirzer 73'	Stadium: Wankdorf Stadium; Attendance: 19,000; Referee: Stanley Rous (England)

5 May 1929 Friendly	Austria	2–2	Hungary	Vienna, Austria
17:00 (UTC+1:00)	Siegl 25'; Weselik 82'	Report	Takács 15', 89'	Stadium: Hohe Warte Stadium; Attendance: 49,000; Referee: Albino Carraro (Italy)

8 September 1929 1927–30 Central European Cup	Czechoslovakia	1–1	Hungary	Prague, Czechoslovakia
16:30 (+1:00)	Svoboda 4'	Report	Kalmár 84'	Stadium: Stadion Letná; Attendance: 28,000; Referee: Paul Ruoff (Switzerland)

6 October 1929 Friendly	Hungary	2–1	Austria	Budapest, Hungary
16:00 (+1:00)	Takács 11'; Avar 52'	Report	Klima 82'	Stadium: Hungária körúti stadion Attendance: 32,000; Referee: Sophus Hansen (Denmark)
