= Borbás =

Borbás is a Hungarian surname. Notable people with the surname include:

- Gáspár Borbás (1884–1976), Hungarian footballer
- Rita Borbás (born 1980), Hungarian handball player
- Vinczé von Borbás (1844–1905), Hungarian botanist
