= Władysław Karasiak =

Polish footballer

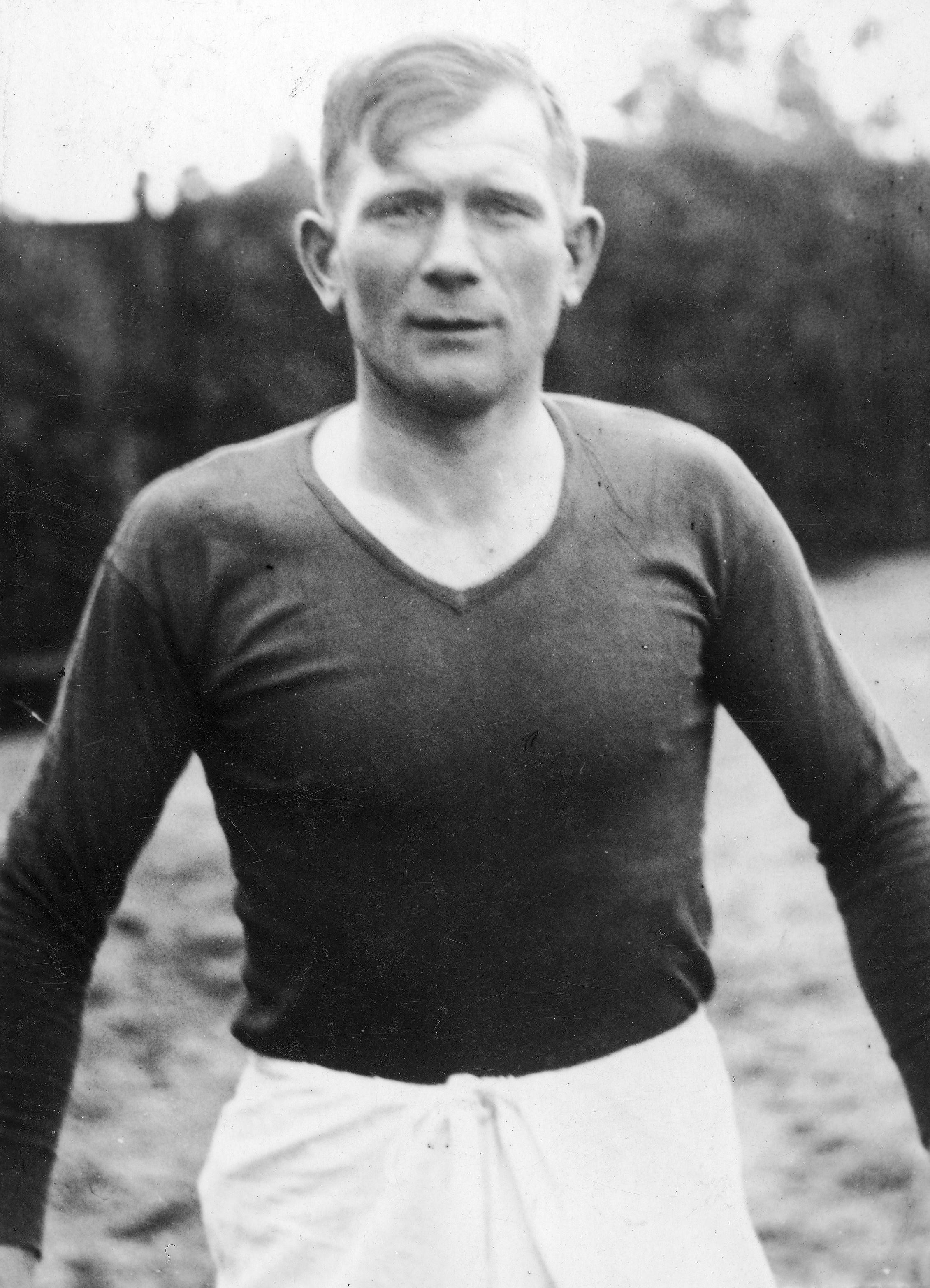

Personal information
- Date of birth: 8 January 1899
- Place of birth: Łódź, Russian Empire
- Date of death: 11 August 1976 (aged 77)
- Place of death: Łódź, Poland
- Height: 1.68 m (5 ft 6 in)
- Position: Defender

Senior career*
Years	Team	Apps	(Gls)
1918	ŁTS Łódź		
1919–1920	ŁTS Łódź		
1921–1922	Korona Warsaw		
1922	PTC Pabianice		
1922	28 Pułk Strzelców Kaniowskich		
1923–1924	WKS Łódź		
1924–1925	ŁKS Łódź		
1925–1927	WKS Łódź		
1927–1930	Klub Turystów Łódź		
1930–1939	ŁKS Łódź		
1945	ŁKS Łódź		
1945–1947	TUR Łódź		
1948–1951	Kolejarz Łódź		

International career
1924–1934	Poland	12	(0)

Managerial career
- 1934: ŁKS Łódź (player-manager)
- * Club domestic league appearances and goals

Władysław Karasiak (8 January 1899 – 11 August 1976) was a Polish footballer who played as a defender.

He played in twelve matches for the Poland national team from 1924 to 1934.
