= Jaroslav Špindler =

Bohemian-Austrian footballer

Personal information
- Full name: Jaroslav Špindler
- Date of birth: 21 April 1890
- Date of death: 1965 (aged 74–75)
- Position: Forward

Senior career*
Years	Team	Apps	(Gls)
190?–1910	Sparta Prague		
1911	Teplitzer FK		
1912–1922	Sparta Prague		

International career
1908	Bohemia	1	(0)
1911	Austria	1	(1)
- * Club domestic league appearances and goals

Jaroslav Špindler (21 April 1890 – 1965) was a Bohemian-Austrian footballer who played as a forward and appeared for both the Bohemia and Austria national teams.

== Career ==
Špindler earned his first and only cap for Bohemia on 5 April 1908 in a friendly match against Hungary, which finished as a 2–5 loss in Budapest. He later represented the Austria national team, making his only appearance on 10 September 1911 in a friendly against Germany. He scored Austria's second goal in the match, which finished as a 2–1 win in Dresden.

== Career statistics ==
=== International ===
Team	Year	Apps	Goals
Bohemia	1908	1	0
Bohemia	Total	1	0
Austria	1911	1	1
Austria	Total	1	1
Career total		2	1

=== International goals ===
No.	Date	Venue	Opponent	Score	Result	Competition
1	10 September 1911	Sportplatz an der Hygieneausstellung, Dresden, German Empire	Germany	2–1	2–1	Friendly
