= Gyula Bíró =

Hungarian footballer

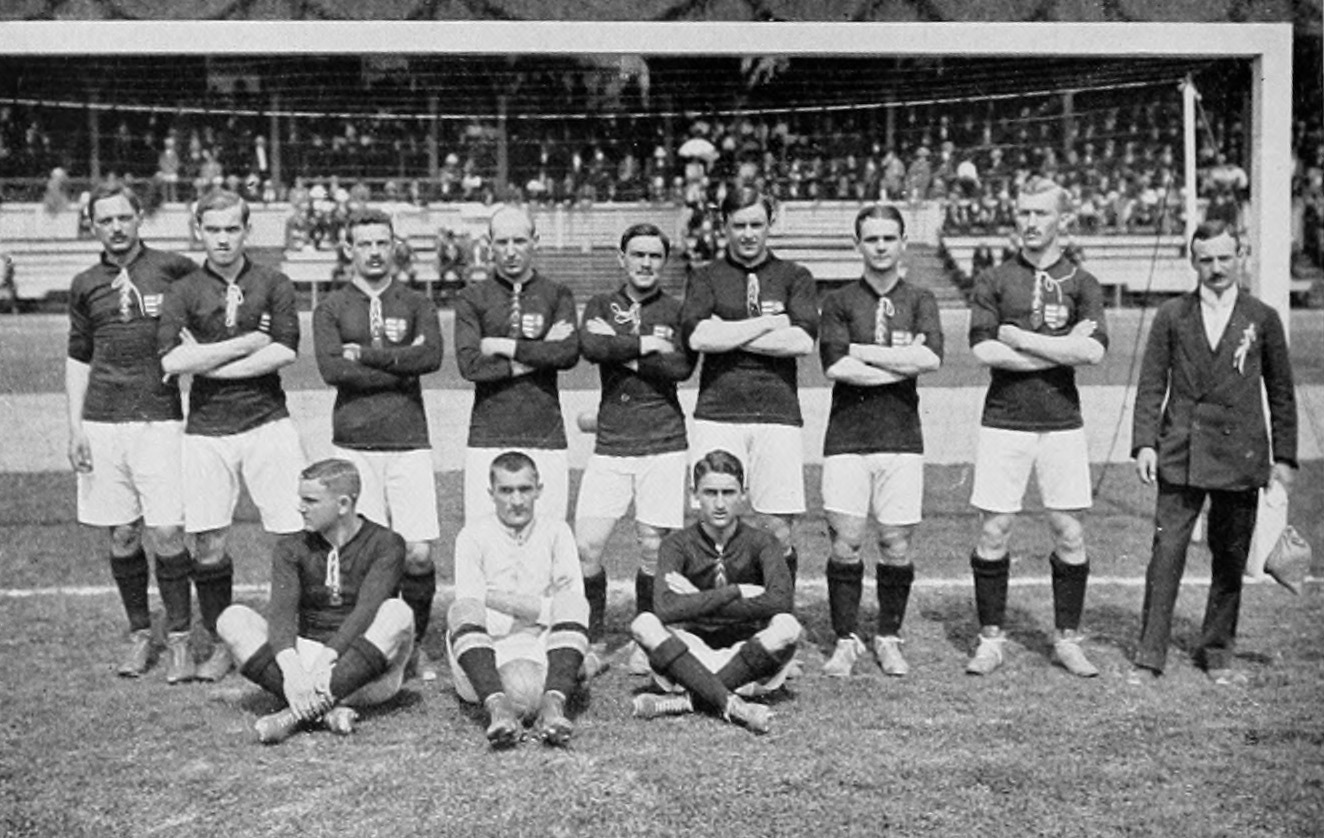
- 1912 Summer Olympics Hungary squad; Biro far right next to the coach

Personal information
- Full name: Gyula Bíró
- Date of birth: 10 May 1890
- Place of birth: Budapest, Austria-Hungary
- Date of death: 23 January 1961 (aged 70)
- Place of death: Mexico City, Mexico
- Positions: Midfielder; forward

Senior career*
| Years | Team | Apps | (Gls) |
| 1905–1916 | MTK | 135 | (17) |

International career
| 1906–1916 | Hungary | 36 | (3) |
- * Club domestic league appearances and goals

Gyula Bíró (10 May 1890 – 23 January 1961) was a Hungarian Olympic football player and manager of Jewish heritage. As part of Hungary, he completed at 1912 Olympics.

== Playing career ==
=== Club career ===
Bíró started his football career at MTK Hungária FC, being barely 15 years old when he made his first team debut in the 1905 championship. He was originally a goalkeeper before becoming a midfielder, but later he also played as a forward. He stayed loyal to his club until the end of his career, becoming a three-time champion and a three-time cup winner. He retired from football at the age of 26 after scoring 17 goals in 135 games in the Hungarian League.

=== International career ===
Bíró made his international debut for Hungary against Bohemia on 7 October 1906, at the age of 16 years and 162 days, thus becoming the second youngest player of the national team, only after József Horváth (15 years and 187 days). In his 36 games with the national team, Biró scored three goals, including his first goal on 2 May 1909, aged 19 years, to help his side to a 4–3 victory over Austria.

== Coaching career ==
Bíró started his coaching career with 1. FC Nürnberg in 1920, before moving to Poland in 1923, where he coached Hasmonea Lwów. In the following year, he took charge of the Poland national team at the 1924 Olympics, where they were eliminated in the first round by Hungary. From June 1924 until November 1925, he was a coach of Warta Poznań. He later returned to Germany as coach of FC Saarbrücken during the 1926–27 season.

Bíró coached FC Baia Mare in Romania in 1930s, and later Atlético Marte in Mexico. Because of his Jewish origin, Bíró left Europe before the start of World War II and went to Mexico.

He worked as an engineer too in the places where he lived, and he died at the age of 71 in Mexico.

== Career statistics ==
=== Goals for Hungary ===
Hungary score listed first, score column indicates score after each Bíró goal.

List of international goals scored by Gyula Bíró
| No. | Date | Venue | Opponent | Score | Result | Competition |
|---|---|---|---|---|---|---|
| 1 | 2 May 1909 | Cricketer Platz, Vienna, Austria | Australia | 2–2 | 4–3 | Friendly |
| 2 | 29 October 1911 | Millenáris Sporttelep, Budapest, Hungary | Switzerland | 1–0 | 9–0 | Friendly |
| 3 | 27 April 1913 | Prater Sportplatz, Vienna, Austria | Australia | 2–1 | 4–1 | Wagner Trophy |

== See also ==
- List of select Jewish football (association; soccer) players
