= Robert Juranic =

Austrian footballer

Personal information
- Date of birth: 29 May 1904
- Date of death: 8 December 1973 (aged 69)

Senior career*
Years	Team	Apps	(Gls)
1925-1931 1931-1932 1932-1936 1936-1937	Floridsdorfer AC; FC St. Gallen; Jednota Zilina; Libertas Wien		

International career
1926–1928	Austria	6	(3)
- * Club domestic league appearances and goals

Robert Juranic (29 May 1904 – 8 December 1973) was an Austrian footballer. He played in six matches for the Austria national football team from 1926 to 1928.
