= Friedrich Köck =

Austrian footballer

Personal information
- Date of birth: 5 February 1898
- Date of death: 1982 (aged 83–84)

International career
Years	Team	Apps	(Gls)
1916–1922	Austria	6	(1)

Friedrich Köck (5 February 1898 – 1982) was an Austrian footballer. He played in six matches for the Austria national football team from 1916 to 1922.
