= Ludwig Hussak =

Austrian footballer (1883–1965)

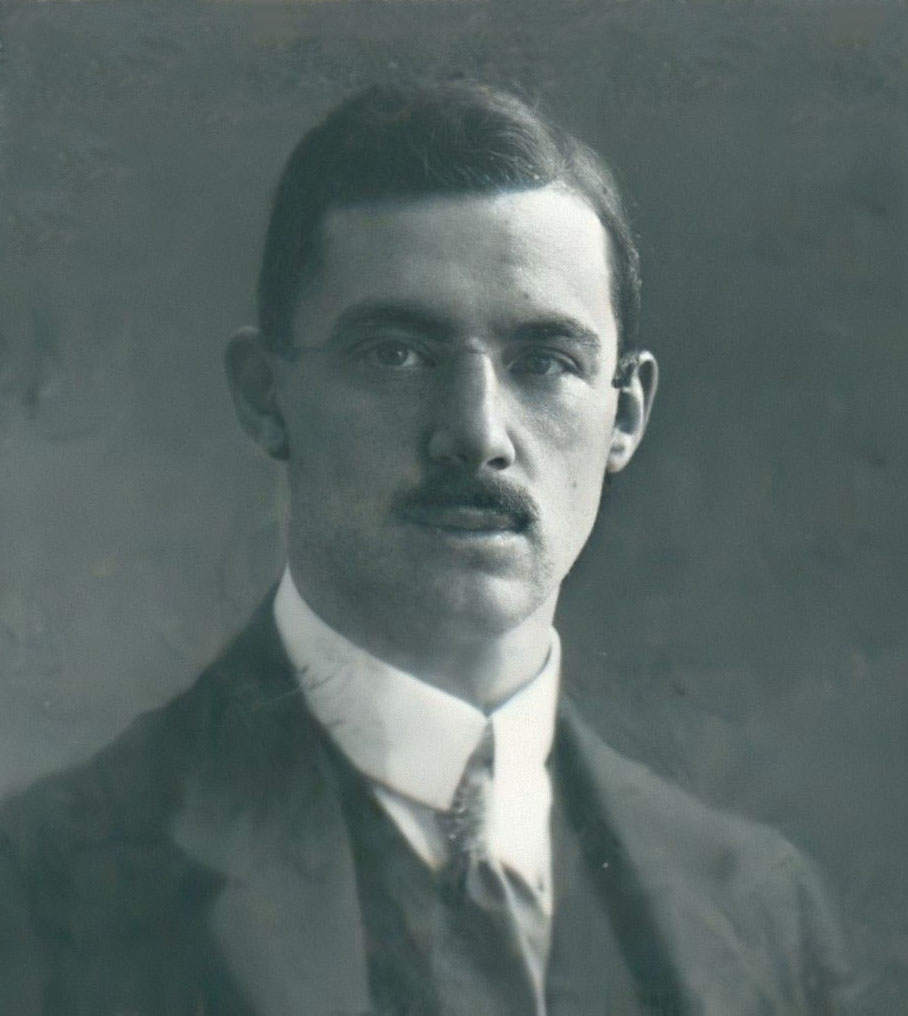
- Portrait of Ludwig Hussak

Personal information
- Full name: Ludwig Hussak
- Date of birth: 31 July 1883
- Date of death: 5 July 1965 (aged 81)
- Position: Striker

Senior career*
Years	Team	Apps	(Gls)
1901–1911	Vienna Cricket and Football-Club		
1911–1914	SV Amateure Wien		

International career
1905–1912	Austria	14	(5)
- * Club domestic league appearances and goals

Ludwig "Luigi" Hussak (31 July 1883 – 5 July 1965) was an Austrian amateur Association football player.

== International career ==
Hussak was a member of the Austrian Olympic squad at the 1912 Summer Olympics and played two matches in the main tournament as well as two matches in the consolation tournament. He scored one goal against Italy in the semi-final of the consolation tournament.

He made his debut for the senior Austria national team in April 1905 against Hungary. He played 14 games and scored 5 goals.
