= Karl Kubik =

Austrian footballer

Personal information
- Full name: Karl Kubik
- Position: Midfielder

Senior career*
Years	Team	Apps	(Gls)
- DFC Prag
- Vienna Cricket and Football-Club
- Sportbrüder Prag

International career
1908	Austria	2	(1)
- * Club domestic league appearances and goals

Karl Kubik was an Austrian footballer who played as a midfielder for DFC Prag in the inaugural German football championship in 1903. He went on to play for Vienna Cricket and Football Club and Sportbrüder Prag, and also represented the Austria national team on two occasions in 1908.
