= Simmeringer Had =

Football stadium in Vienna, Austria

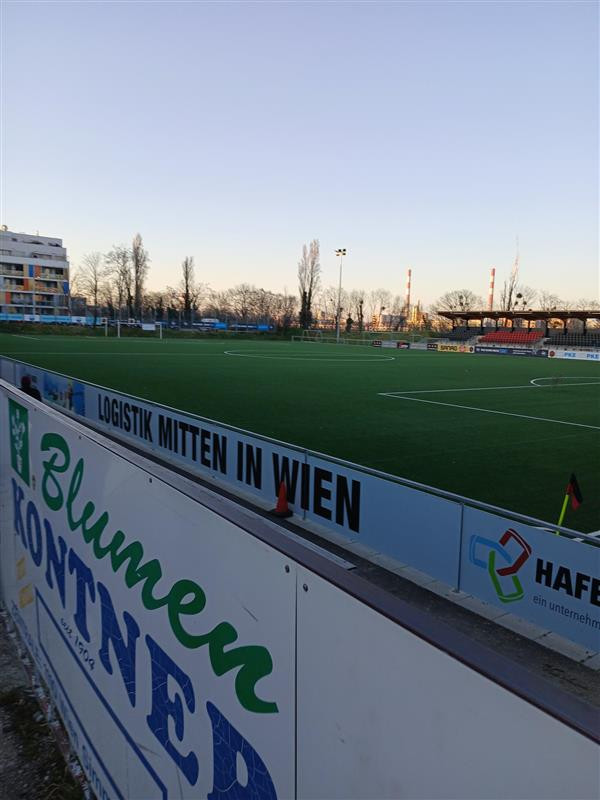
- Simmeringer Had

- Location within Austria
- Address: Simmeringer Hauptstraße 213, 1110 Vienna
- Coordinates: 48.165°N 16.427°E
- Capacity: I: 5,000; II: 35,000-50,000; III: 5,000
- Surface: artificial turf

Construction
- Built: II: 1920
- Opened: I: approx. 1900; II: 20 May 1920; III: 1970
- Demolished: II: approx. 1970

Simmeringer Had is a stadium in Vienna, Austria with a capacity of 5,000 people. There have been three stadiums with the name, all of which have hosted the 1. Simmeringer SC Austrian football club since 1900. The largest and most important of these stadiums also hosted the Austria national team during the 1920s. The current stadium dates to the 1970s.

The name derives from the Simmeringer Haide, a low-lying region of Vienna where the Had was originally geographically located.

== History ==
After the First World War, Austria had no large stadiums but had a growing interest in football. The second Simmeringer Had, which replaced an older stadium built in 1900, was built in a natural amphitheater next to the Sankt Marxer Friedhof. The stadium housed the Austria national team and 1. Simmeringer SC.

The original stadium had a capacity of about 40,000 spectators and was the largest stadium in Austria in 1920. 1. Simmeringer SC opened the stadium on 30 May 1920 with a 1:0 win over Wiener Amateure SV.

The first international match in the stadium was played 26 September 1920, a friendly match between Austria and Germany was played in this stadium which ended 3:2 in favour of Austria in front of 30,000 spectators. Austria played seven international matches as host in this stadium during 1920-1926 and never lost, finishing with a record of five wins and two draws.

At this time, the Had also hosted larger games such as the Austrian Cup final games in 1920 and 1924. The stadium was also used for international matches and for important games of other clubs such as SC Hakoah Vienna. The Bulgaria national football team played their first-ever international in the stadium in 1924 against Austria, which finished 6:0 to the hosts.

SC Hakoah Vienna hosted Wiener Sport-Club at the Simmeringer Had on 6 June 1925 in front of 25,000 spectators, where they won the 1924–25 Austrian football championship title after their goalkeeper scored the winning goal.

The Hohe Warte stadium was built after Simmeringer Sportplatz and took its title of largest stadium, but both were replaced in 1931 by the Praterstadion.

After the Second World War, 1. Simmeringer SC could not afford to maintain the stadium. The club moved into a new stadium, also called Simmeringer Had, in the vicinity of the St. Marx cemetery (the "Wanko-Gstättn") in the early 1970s at the Simmeringer Hauptstraße 213, 1110 Vienna. The original stadium was demolished around this time.

The artificial turf pitch built in the 1990s was completely refurbished in spring 2010.
