= Josef Jelínek (footballer, born 1902) =

Czech footballer

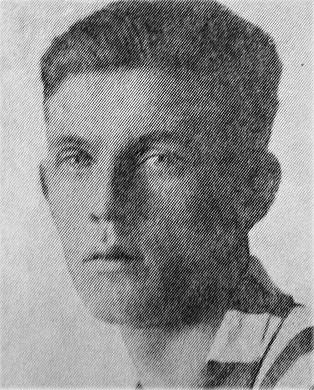

Personal information
- Date of birth: 27 March 1902
- Place of birth: Louny, Austria-Hungary
- Date of death: 10 January 1973 (aged 73)

International career
| Years | Team | Apps | (Gls) |
| 1921–1927 | Czechoslovakia | 15 | (2) |

Josef Jelínek (27 March 1902 – 10 January 1973) was a Czech footballer. He competed for Czechoslovakia in the men's tournament at the 1924 Summer Olympics. At a club level, he played for FK Viktoria Žižkov.
