= Johann Neumann (footballer) =

Austrian footballer

International career
Years	Team	Apps	(Gls)
1911–1923	Austria	8	(2)

Johann Neumann was an Austrian footballer. He played in eight matches for the Austria national football team from 1911 to 1923, scoring two goals.
