= Karl Neubauer =

Austrian footballer (1896–1954)

Personal information
- Date of birth: 10 October 1896
- Place of birth: Vienna, Austria-Hungary
- Date of death: 13 December 1954 (aged 58)
- Position: Midfielder

Senior career*
Years	Team	Apps	(Gls)
- Floridsdorfer AC
- Rapid Wien

International career
1919–1921	Austria	7	(2)
- * Club domestic league appearances and goals

Karl Neubauer (10 October 1896 – 13 December 1954) was an Austrian footballer who played as a midfielder for Floridsdorfer AC and Rapid Wien. He made seven appearances for the Austria national team from 1919 to 1921.
