= György Molnár =

Hungarian footballer

Personal information
- Full name: György Molnár
- Date of birth: 12 February 1901
- Place of birth: Hungary
- Date of death: 25 January 1977 (aged 76)
- Position: Inside forward

Senior career*
Years	Team	Apps	(Gls)
1920–1929	MTK Hungária FC	180	(138)
1927–1928	New York Giants	30	(6)
1929	Brooklyn Hakoah	14	(6)
1929–1930	Brooklyn Wanderers	12	(1)

International career^{‡}
1920–1925	Hungary	27	(11)

Managerial career
- 1935–1936: Pogoń Lwów
- * Club domestic league appearances and goals as of 4 April 2007 ‡ National team caps and goals as of 4 April 2007

György Molnár (12 February 1901 – 25 January 1977) was a Hungarian footballer who began his career in Hungary before finishing it in the American Soccer League.

== Club career ==
Molnár began his career with MTK Hungária FC in the Hungarian League. In 1927, he moved to the United States where he signed with the New York Giants of the American Soccer League. He spent only one season with New York before moving to the Brooklyn Hakoah for the fall 1929 season. Following that season, Molnar transferred to the Brooklyn Wanderers where he finished his career.

== National team ==
Molnar earned twenty-seven caps with the Hungary national team, scoring eleven goals.
