= Mihály Pataki =

Hungarian footballer

Mihály Pataki (7 December 1893 in Budapest – 28 November 1977 in Budapest) was a Hungarian amateur football player who competed in the 1912 Summer Olympics. He was a member of the Hungarian Olympic squad and played one match in the main tournament and one in the consolation tournament. In the final of the consolation tournament, Pataki scored one goal against Austria. He also briefly served as Hungary's national football team manager in 1930.
