= Franz Heinzl =

Austrian footballer (1892–1922)

Personal information
- Date of birth: 13 April 1892
- Place of birth: Stockerau
- Date of death: 16 May 1922 (aged 30)
- Position: Forward

Senior career*
| Years | Team | Apps | (Gls) |
| 1908–1913 | SV Stockerau | | |
| 1914–1919 | Wiener AF | | |

International career
| 1914–1917 | Austria | 7 | (4) |
- * Club domestic league appearances and goals

Franz Heinzl (13 April 1892 – 16 May 1922) was an Austrian footballer who played as a forward. He made seven appearances for the Austria national team from 1914 to 1917.
