= István Tóth (footballer) =

Hungarian footballer and manager

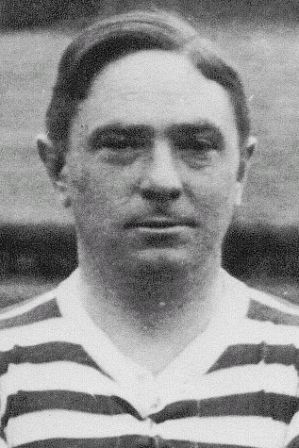

Personal information
- Full name: István Tóth-Potya
- Date of birth: 28 July 1891
- Place of birth: Budapest, Austria-Hungary
- Date of death: 6 February 1945 (aged 53)
- Place of death: Budapest, Hungary
- Position: Striker

Senior career*
Years	Team	Apps	(Gls)
- Ferencváros

International career
1909–1928	Hungary	19	(8)

Managerial career
- 1926–1930: Ferencváros
- 1930–1931: Triestina
- 1931–1932: Internazionale
- 1932–1934: Újpest
- 1934–1936: Triestina
- 1938–1939: Triestina
- 1943: Ferencváros
- * Club domestic league appearances and goals

István Tóth-Potya (28 July 1891 – 6 February 1945) was a Hungarian amateur footballer who played as a forward.

He was a member of the Hungarian Olympic squad at the 1912 Summer Olympics. He was an unused reserve player for the duration of the games and did not play a match in the 1912 football tournament.

For the Hungary national team he played 19 games and scored 8 goals. He later had a coaching career, with alternating spells managing teams in Hungary and Italy.

== Death ==
Returning from Italy and serving as a reserve officer in the Hungarian army, during World War II he became a member of the Hungarian anti-fascist resistance following Hungary's invasion by Germany, in association with former teammate Geza Kertesz helping several hundred Jews escape from Nazi custody and death. He and Kertesz were arrested by the German Gestapo in late 1944 and executed in February 1945 in Budapest by Hitler's Hungarian allies, Szálasi's Arrow Cross henchmen.

His body and that of Kertesz were reburied after the war in April 1946 in Kerepesi Cemetery, Budapest.
