= Albert Prince-Cox =

English footballer (1890–1967)

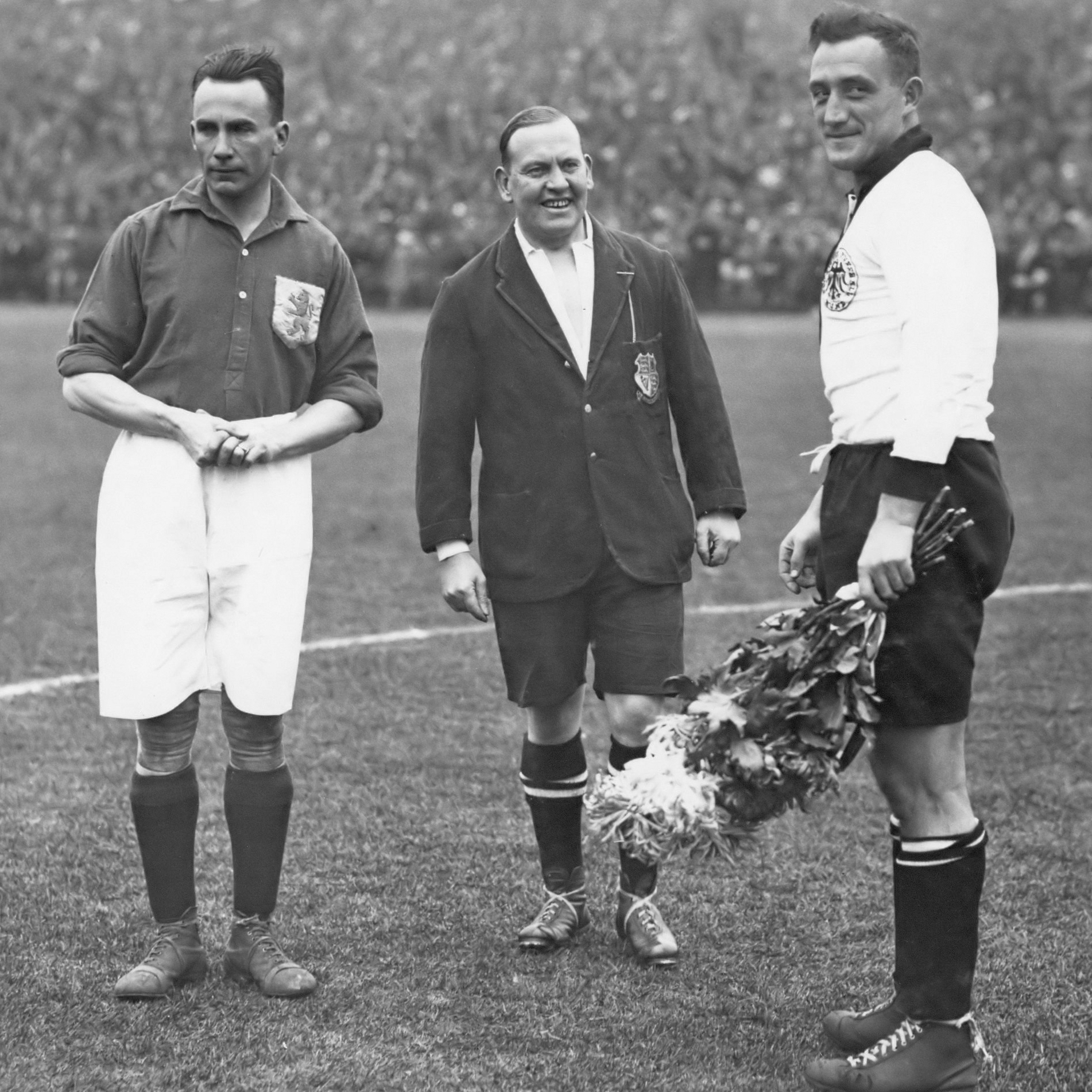
- Prince-Cox (middle) refereeing in 1927

Personal information
- Full name: Albert James Prince-Cox
- Date of birth: 8 August 1890
- Place of birth: Southsea, England
- Date of death: 26 October 1967 (aged 76)
- Place of death: Bristol, England

Managerial career
- Years: Team
- 1930–1936: Bristol Rovers
- 1938: Gloucester City

Captain Albert James Prince-Cox (8 August 1890 – 26 October 1967) was an English football manager, player and referee, boxer, boxing promoter and a fellow of the Royal Meteorological Society.

Prince-Cox became the Secretary-manager of Bristol Rovers in 1930. At the time of his appointment the club were struggling financially, but he was credited with turning the situation around through his use of the player transfer market to buy and sell players for a profit. He left The Pirates (a nickname that he introduced, along with the team's blue and white quartered shirts, which are still worn today) in 1936. He then spent two years working as a full-time boxing promoter, before being appointed as manager of Gloucester City in 1938, at which point he was one of the best-known sporting figures in the West of England.

He died in late 1967, aged 77, in Bristol.
