= Leopold Neubauer =

Austrian footballer (1889–1960)

Personal information
- Date of birth: 15 October 1889
- Place of birth: Vienna, Austria-Hungary
- Date of death: 16 February 1960 (aged 70)
- Position: Forward

Senior career*
Years	Team	Apps	(Gls)
1908–1913	Wiener Sport-Club		
1913–1919	Wiener AF		

International career
1912–1916	Austria	18	(6)
- * Club domestic league appearances and goals

Leopold Neubauer (15 October 1889 – 16 February 1960) was an Austrian international footballer who played as a striker. He was born in Vienna.

== International career ==
Neubauer played for Austria's senior football team back when Austria was still part of Austria-Hungary. He represented Austria at the Olympic Games in 1912, where he scored once in a regular Olympic match and once in the consolation tournament.

== Honours ==
=== Individual ===
- Austrian Bundesliga top scorer (1): 1916–1917
