= Albert Ströck =

Association football player (1903–1971)

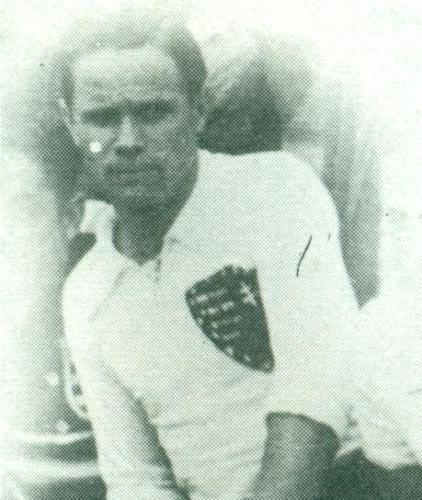

Personal information
- Date of birth: 6 March 1903
- Place of birth: Nagyvárad, Austria-Hungary
- Date of death: 10 July 1969 (aged 66)
- Place of death: Budapest, Hungary
- Position: Forward

Senior career*
Years	Team	Apps	(Gls)
1921–1923	Stăruința Oradea		
1925–1926	CA Oradea	1	(2)
1927–1932	Újpest	95	(24)
1933–1934	La Chaux-de-Fonds		
Total		96	(26)

International career
1922–1926	Romania	8	(2)
1927–1932	Hungary	15	(3)
- * Club domestic league appearances and goals

Albert Ströck (6 March 1903 – 10 July 1969), also known as Adalbert Ströck and Albert Török, was a Romanian-Hungarian footballer who played as a forward for CA Oradea, Újpest FC and also for Romania and Hungary. He was part of Romania's squad for the football tournament at the 1924 Summer Olympics.

He played for Újpest FC between 1929 and 1932, winning the Mitropa Cup 1929 and the Coupe des Nations 1930. He then moved to Switzerland, to FC La Chaux-de-Fonds.

== Honours ==
Újpest FC

- Nemzeti Bajnokság I: 1929–30, 1930–31

Hungary

- Mitropa Cup: 1929
- Coupe des Nations 1930
