= Johann Klima =

Austrian footballer

Personal information
- Date of birth: 11 February 1900
- Place of birth: Austria
- Date of death: 5 January 1946 (aged 45)
- Position: Forward

Senior career*
Years	Team	Apps	(Gls)
1919–3	Admira Wien		

International career
1923–31	Austria	11	(3)
- * Club domestic league appearances and goals

Johann "Hans" Klima (11 February 1900 – 5 January 1946) was an Austrian international footballer. At club level, he played for Admira Wien. He made 11 appearances for the Austria national team, scoring three goals.
