= István Priboj =

Hungarian-Slovak footballer and coach

István Priboj Slovak, Štefan Priboj, (2 May 1894 – 27 October 1957, in Žilina) was a former Hungarian and Slovak football player and coach. He played for Újpesti TE, 1. ČsŠK Bratislava and Dynamo Žilina, and he was the top scorer in the Hungarian Championship in 1922–23. He played 6 matches for the Hungarian national team, scoring 3 goals between 1919 and 1925. From 1940 to 1941, he coached the Slovak national team.
