= Ferdinand Swatosch =

Austrian footballer and manager

Personal information
- Date of birth: May 11, 1894
- Place of birth: Simmering, Austria-Hungary
- Date of death: November 29, 1974 (aged 80)
- Position: Striker

Senior career*
Years	Team	Apps	(Gls)
1911–1914	1. Simmeringer SC		
1914–1918	SK Rapid Wien	25	(23)
1919–1920	1. Simmeringer SC		
1920–1924	Wiener Amateur-SV		
1924–	SpVgg Sülz 07		
1932	FC Mulhouse		

International career
1914–1925	Austria	23	(18)

Managerial career
- Rheydter SV
- 1932–1933: FC Mulhouse
- 1933–1935: Lützenkirchen
- 1935–1936: Rot-Weiß Oberhausen
- 1936–1938: Borussia Dortmund
- 1939–1940: Arminia Bielefeld
- 1946–1947: Arminia Bielefeld
- 1948–1949: Schalke 04
- 1951–1952: Borussia Neunkirchen
- 1952–1953: Fortuna Köln
- * Club domestic league appearances and goals

Ferdinand "Ferdl" Swatosch (11 May 1894 – 29 November 1974) was an Austrian football player and manager.

He played for 1. Simmeringer SC, SK Rapid Wien, Wiener Amateur-SV, SpVgg Sülz 07 and obtained 23 caps for Austria, scoring 18 goals.
