= Josef Blum =

Association footballer and coach

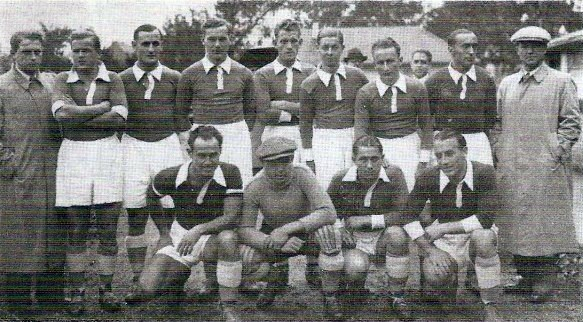

Personal information
- Date of birth: 4 February 1898
- Place of birth: Vienna, Austria-Hungary
- Date of death: 18 October 1956 (aged 58)
- Place of death: Vienna, Austria
- Position: Defender

Senior career*
Years	Team	Apps	(Gls)
1913–1918	NAC		
1918–1933	Vienna		

International career
1920–1932	Austria	51	(3)

Managerial career
- 1932–1935: FK Austria Wien
- 1935–1938: Strasbourg
- 1938–1945: First Vienna FC
- 1945–1946: Wiener Sport-Club
- 1946–1947: Kapfenberger SV
- * Club domestic league appearances and goals

Josef Blum (4 February 1898 – 18 October 1956) was an Austrian international footballer and coach.
