= Johann Andres =

Austrian footballer

Personal information
- Birth name: Johann Josef Andres
- Date of birth: 17 June 1887
- Place of birth: Vienna, Austria-Hungary
- Date of death: 25 May 1970 (aged 82)
- Place of death: Vienna, Austria
- Position: Forward

International career
Years	Team	Apps	(Gls)
1908–1912	Austria	6	(2)

Johann Josef Andres (17 June 1887 – 25 May 1970) was an Austrian footballer. He played in six matches for the Austria national football team from 1908 to 1912. He was also part of Austria's squad for the football tournament at the 1912 Summer Olympics, but he did not play in any matches.
