= Robert Merz =

Austrian footballer (1887–1914)

Personal information
- Full name: Robert Merz
- Date of birth: 25 November 1887
- Place of birth: Zizkow, Austria-Hungary
- Date of death: 30 August 1914 (aged 26)
- Place of death: Poturzyn, Russian Poland
- Position: Striker

Senior career*
Years	Team	Apps	(Gls)
1904–1907	Wiener SV		
1907–1914	DFC Prag		

International career
1908–1914	Austria	13	(5)
- * Club domestic league appearances and goals

Robert Merz (25 November 1887 – 30 August 1914) was an Austrian amateur football (soccer) player. He died during World War I, aged 26.

== Club career ==
Born in Zizkow, Merz began playing youth football with a predecessor to Wiener Sport-Club (Wiener SV). He joined Wiener SV's senior side at age 16, before becoming a professional with DFC Prag when he moved back to his hometown in 1907.

== International career ==
He was a member of the Austrian Olympic squad at the 1912 Summer Olympics and played two matches in the main tournament as well as two matches in the consolation tournament. He scored two goals against Germany in the first round of the main tournament.

For the Austria national football team, he played 13 games and scored 5 goals.

== Military service ==
Merz was a reserve lieutenant in the Austro-Hungarian Army during World War I.

== See also ==
- List of Olympians killed in World War I
