= Karl Schrenk =

Austrian footballer

Personal information
- Position: Midfielder

Senior career*
| Years | Team | Apps | (Gls) |
- First Vienna FC

International career
| 1909 | Austria | 2 | (1) |

Managerial career
- 1924–1927: VfL Osnabrück
- 1935–1936: Aarau
- 1936–1938: Club Brugge
- 1940–1942: Alemannia Aachen
- * Club domestic league appearances and goals

Karl Schrenk was an Austrian football player and manager. He played in two matches for the Austria national football team in 1909.
