= Wilhelm Cutti =

Austrian footballer

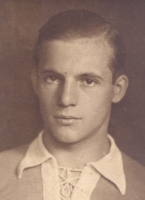
- Wilhelm Morocutti

Personal information
- Full name: Wilhelm Morocutti
- Position: Forward

Youth career
- Amateure

Senior career*
Years	Team	Apps	(Gls)
1917–1930	Amateure		
1930–?	Wiener AC		

International career
1922–1928	Austria	17	(5)
- * Club domestic league appearances and goals

Wilhelm Cutti (9 May 1900 in Wien, Austria-Hungary – 2 February 1962 in Oberneukirchen, Austria) was an Austrian international footballer.
