= Johann Kowanda =

Austrian footballer

Personal information
- Date of birth: 1 December 1896
- Date of death: 24 March 1947 (aged 50)

International career
Years	Team	Apps	(Gls)
1922	Austria	1	(1)

Johann Kowanda (1 December 1896 – 24 March 1947) was an Austrian footballer. He played in one match for the Austria national football team in 1922.
