= Jan Studnicka =

Austrian footballer (1883–1967)

Johann "Jan" Studnicka
Personal information
- Date of birth: 12 October 1883
- Place of birth: Vienna, Austria
- Date of death: 18 October 1967 (aged 84)
- Position: Forward

Youth career
- –1897: Jugendhorst

Senior career*
Years	Team	Apps	(Gls)
1897–1920	Wiener AC	122	(91)

International career
1902–1918	Austria	28	(18)

Managerial career
- 1920–1922: First Vienna FC
- 1922–1924: FC Zürich
- SpC Rudolfshügel
- 1929–1930: FC Zürich
- * Club domestic league appearances and goals

Johann "Jan" Studnicka (12 October 1883 – 18 October 1967) was an Austrian international footballer. He played for Wiener AC and on the Austria national team and managed several clubs. He was also competed at the 1912 Summer Olympics.
