= Adolf Fischera =

Austrian footballer

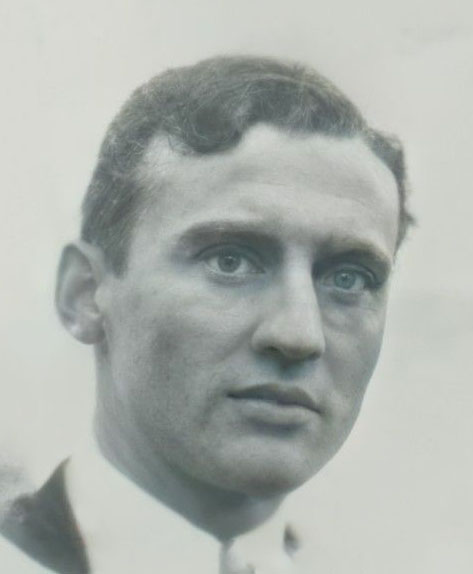

Personal information
- Date of birth: August 22, 1888
- Place of birth: Wien, Austria
- Date of death: August 25, 1938 (aged 50)
- Position: Forward

Senior career*
| Years | Team | Apps | (Gls) |
| 1904–05 | ASK Schwechat | | |
| 1906–11 | Wiener AC | | |
| 1911–18 | Wiener AF | | |
| 1918–19 | SC Germania Schwechat | | |
| 1920–22 | Borussia Neunkirchen | | |
| 1922–23 | Wiener AF | | |
| 1923–24 | First Vienna FC | | |

International career
| 1908–23 | Austria | 15 | (8) |

Managerial career
- 1920–22: Borussia Neunkirchen
- * Club domestic league appearances and goals

Adolf "Adi" Fischera (22 August 1888 – 25 August 1938) was an Austrian international footballer. At club level, he played for ASK Schwechat, Wiener AC, Wiener AF, SC Germania Schwechat, Borussia Neunkirchen and First Vienna FC. He made 15 appearances for the Austria national team, scoring eight goals.

On 26 May 1912 WAF hosted a match with Middlesex Wanderers whom they beat 5-1. Cookson scored for Middlesex and Fischera scored a hattrick for WAF, with two more goals from Engelbert König (senior) and Richard 'Little' Kohn. He also managed Borussia Neunkirchen.

He was also part of Austria's squad for the football tournament at the 1912 Summer Olympics, but he did not play in any matches.

== Career Statistics ==
=== International ===
As of match played 17 July 2026

Appearances and goals by national team and year
| National team | Year | Apps | Goals |
|---|---|---|---|
Austria
| Austria | 1908 | 3 | 2 |
| Austria | 1910 | 2 | 1 |
| Austria | 1912 | 2 | 1 |
| Austria | 1913 | 1 | 0 |
| Austria | 1914 | 1 | 2 |
| Austria | 1922 | 5 | 2 |
| Austria | 1922 | 1 | 0 |
| Total | | 15 | 8 |
