= Rudolfsheim =

Neighborhood in Vienna, Austria

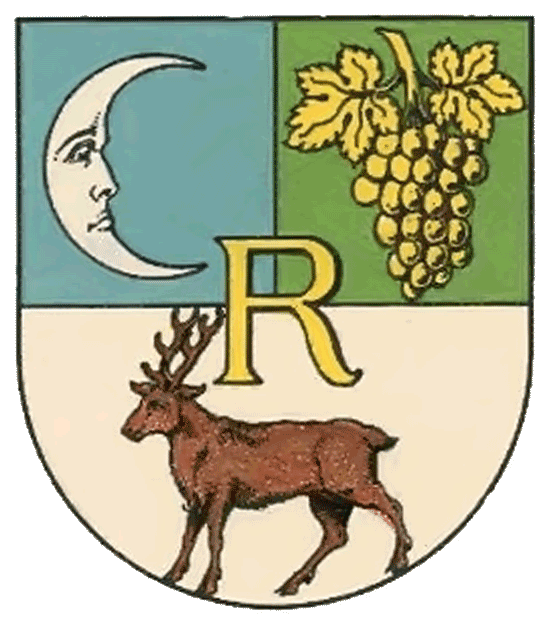
Coat of arms

Rudolfsheim is a neighborhood of the district Rudolfsheim-Fünfhaus in Vienna, Austria. The psychologist Alfred Adler was born in Rudolfsheim.
