= Otto Höss =

Austrian footballer (1897–1971)

Personal information
- Date of birth: 4 June 1897
- Date of death: 27 March 1971 (aged 73)
- Position: Forward

Senior career*
Years	Team	Apps	(Gls)
1919–1920	Wiener Sport-Club		
1920–1921	Wiener AF		
1921–1923	DFC Prag		
1923–1924	First Vienna FC		
1925–1926	Wiener Sport-Club		
1927–1929	Bástya FC Szeged		
1929	SK Slovan HAC		

International career
1923–1926	Austria	6	(2)

Managerial career
- 1930–1931: Cantonal Neuchâtel
- 1932–1936: ADO Den Haag
- 1937: Servette
- 1938–1939: Gefle IF
- * Club domestic league appearances and goals

Otto Höss (4 June 1897 – 27 March 1971) was an Austrian football player and manager who played as a forward. He made six appearances for the Austria national team from 1923 to 1926.
