= Franz Eckl =

Austrian footballer

Personal information
- Date of birth: 11 January 1896
- Date of death: 19 November 1966 (aged 70)

International career
| Years | Team | Apps | (Gls) |
| 1919–1928 | Austria | 7 | (1) |

Franz Eckl (11 January 1896 – 19 November 1966) was an Austrian footballer. He played in seven matches for the Austria national football team from 1919 to 1928.
