= Willi Worpitzky =

German footballer and manager

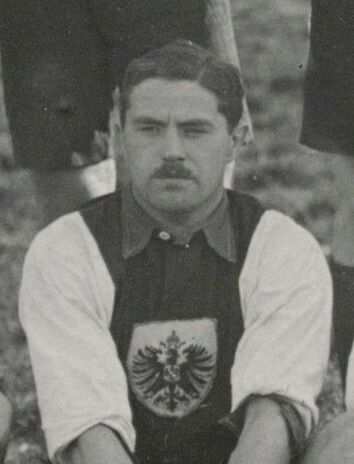
- Willi Worpitzky in 1910

Personal information
- Date of birth: 25 August 1886
- Place of birth: Berlin-Pankow, Germany
- Date of death: 30 October 1953 (aged 67)
- Position: Forward

Senior career*
Years	Team	Apps	(Gls)
1904–1907	Minerva 93 Berlin		
1907–1917	Viktoria 89 Berlin	13	(23)
1917-1918	VfL Halle	1	(1)
- Wacker Halle
- VfB Pankow

International career
1909–1912	Germany	9	(5)

Managerial career
- Brandenburger SC 05
- FC Oranienburg
- SC Charlottenburg
- * Club domestic league appearances and goals

Willi Worpitzky (25 August 1886 – 30 October 1953) was a German footballer and manager. He competed in the 1912 Summer Olympics. Worpitzky was a member of the German Olympic squad and played one match in the main tournament.
