= Imre Taussig =

Hungarian footballer (1894–1945)

Personal information
- Full name: Imre Taussig
- Date of birth: 28 June 1894
- Place of birth: Aba, Austria-Hungary
- Date of death: 23 March 1945 (aged 50)
- Place of death: Bruck an der Leitha Camp, Nazi Germany
- Position: Striker

Youth career
- 1907–1909: MTK

Senior career*
Years	Team	Apps	(Gls)
1909–192?	MTK		

International career^{‡}
1914–1918	Hungary	5	(1)
- * Club domestic league appearances and goals as of 17 January 2016 ‡ National team caps and goals as of 17 January 2016

Imre Taussig (28 June 1894 – 23 March 1945) was a Hungarian international footballer who played as a forward right winger. Taussig, who was Jewish, played club football for MTK for his entire career, winning three titles, and also represented Hungary national team at the international level, earning 5 caps between 1914 and 1918.

== Professional ==
=== Clubs ===
Taussig began his football career when he signed with MTK Budapest FC in 1907. He was 13 at the time.

=== National team ===
Taussig earned 5 caps with the Hungary national football team between 1914 and 1918.

== Personal ==
During the World War 2 he was in Bruck an der Leitha Camp, Austria (then part of Nazi Germany). Imre, then 50 years old was murdered in March 1945 in Bruck an der Leitha Camp, Austria. This information is based on a list of murdered persons found in M.34.1 – Yad Vashem research.

== Honours ==
- Nemzeti Bajnokság I (3): 1913–14, 1916–17, 1919–20
- Magyar Kupa (1): 1914
