= Fritz Dünmann =

Austrian footballer

Personal information
- Date of birth: 5 December 1884
- Place of birth: Vienna, Austria-Hungary
- Date of death: 5 June 1942 (aged 57)
- Place of death: Auschwitz, German-occupied Poland
- Position: Striker

Senior career*
Years	Team	Apps	(Gls)
- Rapid Wien

International career
1906–1907	Austria	3	(2)
- * Club domestic league appearances and goals

Alfred Dünmann (5 December 1884 – 5 June 1942), commonly known as Fritz Dünmann, was an Austrian footballer who played as a striker. He played in three matches for the Austria national football team from 1906 to 1907.

== Career ==
Dünmann was born in Vienna. He played as a striker for Rapid Wien and for the Austria national team, earning three caps from 1906 to 1907, and scoring two goals.

== Life ==
Being a Jew, Dünmann was deported to Dachau concentration camp in the November pogrom in 1938, but was released and went into exile in France. However, he was imprisoned again in 1941, and was deported via various intermediate camps to Auschwitz concentration camp, where he was eventually murdered on 5 June 1942.
