= Wilhelm Schmieger =

Austrian footballer and manager

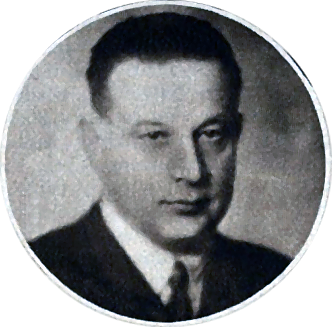

Personal information
- Date of birth: April 24, 1887
- Place of birth: Wien, Austria
- Date of death: October 10, 1950 (aged 63)
- Position: Forward

Senior career*
Years	Team	Apps	(Gls)
1904–20	Wiener Sport-Club		

International career
1907–12	Austria	7	(5)

Managerial career
- 1918–23: Wiener Sport-Club
- * Club domestic league appearances and goals

Wilhelm Schmieger was an Austrian international footballer. At club level, he played for Wiener Sport-Club. He made 7 appearances for the Austria national team, scoring five goals. He also managed Wiener Sport-Club. In addition, he also acted as referee in various international matches between 1914 and 1916.
