= Kálmán Konrád =

Hungarian footballer (1896–1980)

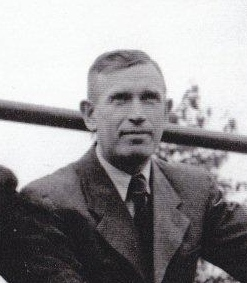

Personal information
- Date of birth: 23 May 1896
- Place of birth: Bácspalánka, Austria-Hungary (today Bačka Palanka, Serbia)
- Date of death: 10 May 1980 (aged 83)
- Place of death: Stockholm, Sweden
- Position: Inside forward

Senior career*
Years	Team	Apps	(Gls)
1910–1916	MTK Hungária		
1916–1917	Magyar AC		
1917–1919	MTK Hungária	94	(88)
1919–1926	Wiener Amateur SV	116	(79)
1926–1927	Brooklyn Wanderers	27	(2)
1927–1928	MTK Hungária		
Total		237	(169)

International career
1914–1928	Hungary	12	(2)

Managerial career
- 1928–1930: Bayern Munich
- 1930–1931: FC Zürich
- 1933–1935: Slavia Prague
- 1936–1937: Rapid Bucharest
- 1937–1939: 1. FC Brno
- 1939–1942: Örebro SK
- 1942–1947: Åtvidabergs FF
- 1947–1950: Malmö FF
- 1950–1951: Råå IF
- 1951–1955: BK Derby
- 1955–1956: Junsele IF
- * Club domestic league appearances and goals

Kálmán Konrád (23 May 1896 – 10 May 1980) was regarded as one of the best footballers in the Kingdom of Hungary in the 1910s. An inside right, he played on the Hungary national team with his brother, Jenő Konrád. Kálmán, who later played for Austria, coached the Romania national team for five games in the mid-1930s as well as a number of club teams up to his retirement in 1956.

== Career ==
=== Playing career ===
Born in Bácspalánka (Bačka Palanka), a town on the Danube River in Austria-Hungary (now part of Vojvodina, Serbia), Konrád moved to Budapest as a small child. He joined the club MTK Hungária FC in 1910 at the age of 14 and then joined the first team in the Hungarian League in 1913 at the age of 17. Konrád played for MTK from 1913 to 1919 and helped the team win the Hungarian Championship in 1914, 1917–1919 (there was no league in 1915 or 1916 because of World War I). In the three championship seasons between 1917 and 1919, MTK outscored their opponents, 376–46, and had an overall record of 60-4-2. Konrád played in 94 games during this incredible run and scored 88 goals while a player for MTK. He was also a member of the Hungary national team, appearing in 12 games and scoring two goals.

In August 1926, Konrád was brought to the United States by Nat Agar, the owner-manager of the Brooklyn Wanderers of the American Soccer League (ASL). Konrád's talent was said to be so legendary that Agar was forced to keep the transfer a secret until he was on his way to the U.S. That year, Konrád played for Brooklyn and appeared in 27 games and scored two goals. That season, he also played in the International Soccer League, a new league of American and Canadian teams. The Wanderers of the ASL participated and won the league championship with a 5–3–1 record. Konrád scored four goals while playing in every game.

After his only season in the United States, Konrád returned to Hungary and ended his playing career with MTK during the 1927–28 season.

=== Managerial career ===
After his retirement from playing in 1928, Konrád became a coach and led a succession of clubs including Bayern Munich, FC Zürich, and Slavia Prague. Konrád also coached a number of teams in Sweden, including Malmö FF, where he won the Allsvenskan in 1949 and 1950. He settled in Sweden and lived there until his death in 1980.

== Honours ==
=== As manager ===
Malmö FF

- Allsvenskan: 1949, 1950
