= Franz Hansl =

Austrian footballer (1897–1942)

Personal information
- Date of birth: 23 October 1897
- Place of birth: Troppau, Austria-Hungary
- Date of death: 13 August 1942 (aged 44)
- Position: Forward

Senior career*
Years	Team	Apps	(Gls)
1918–1919	DSV Troppau		
1919–1924	Wiener Amateur-Sportverein		
1924–1925	Wiener AC		
1926–1927	Forlì FC		

International career
1919–1922	Austria	4	(3)

Managerial career
- 1927–1932: Forlì FC
- 1932–1933: Torino
- 1933–1934: Alessandria
- 1934–1935: Livorno
- 1936–1937: Grosseto
- 1938–1939: Salernitana
- 1939–1914: Cosenza
- * Club domestic league appearances and goals

Franz Hansl (23 October 1897 – 13 August 1942) was an Austrian footballer who played as a forward. He made four appearances for the Austria national team from 1919 to 1922.
