= Sándor Bodnár =

Hungarian footballer

Sándor Bodnár (20 September 1890 – 6 November 1955) was a Hungarian association football player who competed in the 1912 Summer Olympics.

He was a member of the Hungarian Olympic squad and played one match in the main tournament as well as two matches in the consolation tournament. In the consolation tournament he scored one goal, but in the match when Hungary played against England he missed a penalty at 0:0.

He later stated that he didn't see a spike that a fieldworker left on the penalty spot. When he kicked the ball, he touched this spike. His clubs in Hungary were the NSC (Nemzeti SC) and MAC (Magyar AC). He played 20 times on the national team and scored 18 goals (1910–1916). He scored the national team 100. goals in 1912 against Norway.
