= Károly Kóródy =

Hungarian footballer

Personal information
- Date of birth: 8 February 1887
- Date of death: 8 June 1917 (aged 30)

International career
Years	Team	Apps	(Gls)
1908–1912	Hungary	15	(7)

Károly Kóródy (8 February 1887 – 8 June 1917) was a Hungarian footballer. He played in 15 matches for the Hungary national football team from 1908 to 1912. He was also part of Hungary's squad for the football tournament at the 1912 Summer Olympics, but he did not play in any matches.
