= Karl Jiszda =

Austrian footballer and manager

Personal information
- Date of birth: 21 July 1899
- Date of death: 30 November 1963 (aged 64)
- Position: Forward

Senior career*
Years	Team	Apps	(Gls)
1916–1924	Floridsdorfer AC		
1924	First Vienna FC		
1925–1927	Floridsdorfer AC		
1928	Brooklyn Wanderers		
1928–1930	Floridsdorfer AC		

International career
1921–1927	Austria	11	(7)

Managerial career
- 1931: Garbarnia Kraków
- 1931–1934: Floridsdorfer AC
- 1934–1935: FC Zürich
- FC Oerlikon
- 1937: Lithuania
- 1945–19??: Floridsdorfer AC (president)
- * Club domestic league appearances and goals

Karl Jiszda (21 July 1899 – 30 November 1963) was an Austrian football player and manager. He played for Floridsdorfer AC, First Vienna FC and Brooklyn Wanderers. On 31 July 1921, Jiszda debuted for the Austria national team against Finland in a 3–2 loss.

He coached Garbarnia Kraków, Floridsdorfer AC, FC Zürich and FC Oerlikon. In 1937 he worked as head coach of the Lithuania national team.

== Honours ==
Garbarnia Kraków

- Ekstraklasa: 1931
