= József Pokorny =

Hungarian footballer

Personal information
- Date of birth: 17 July 1882
- Place of birth: Budapest, Austria-Hungary
- Date of death: 17 March 1955 (aged 72)
- Position: Midfielder

Senior career*
Years	Team	Apps	(Gls)
1901–05	Ferencvárosi TC		

International career
1902–05	Hungary	5	(5)
- * Club domestic league appearances and goals

József Pokorny (17 July 1882 – 17 March 1955) was a Hungarian international footballer. At club level, he played for Ferencvárosi TC. He made five appearances for the Hungary national team, scoring five goals.
