= Johann Schwarz =

Austrian footballer

Personal information
- Full name: Johann Schwarz
- Position: Defender

Senior career*
Years	Team	Apps	(Gls)
- DFC Prag

International career
1908	Austria	1	(0)
- * Club domestic league appearances and goals

Johann Schwarz was an Austrian footballer who played as a defender. He played for DFC Prag in the inaugural German football championship in 1903, and also represented the Austria national football team in a friendly against England in 1908.
