= August Kraupar =

Austrian footballer

Personal information
- Date of birth: 14 April 1895
- Date of death: 26 December 1968 (aged 73)

International career
Years	Team	Apps	(Gls)
1915–1918	Austria	9	(0)

August Kraupar (14 April 1895 – 26 December 1968) was an Austrian footballer. He played in nine matches for the Austria national football team from 1915 to 1918.
