= Václav Prousek =

Austrian footballer

International career
Years	Team	Apps	(Gls)
1917	Austria	2	(1)

Václav Prousek was an Austrian footballer. He played in two matches for the Austria national football team in 1917.
