= Ferenc Weisz =

Hungarian footballer and manager (1885–1944)

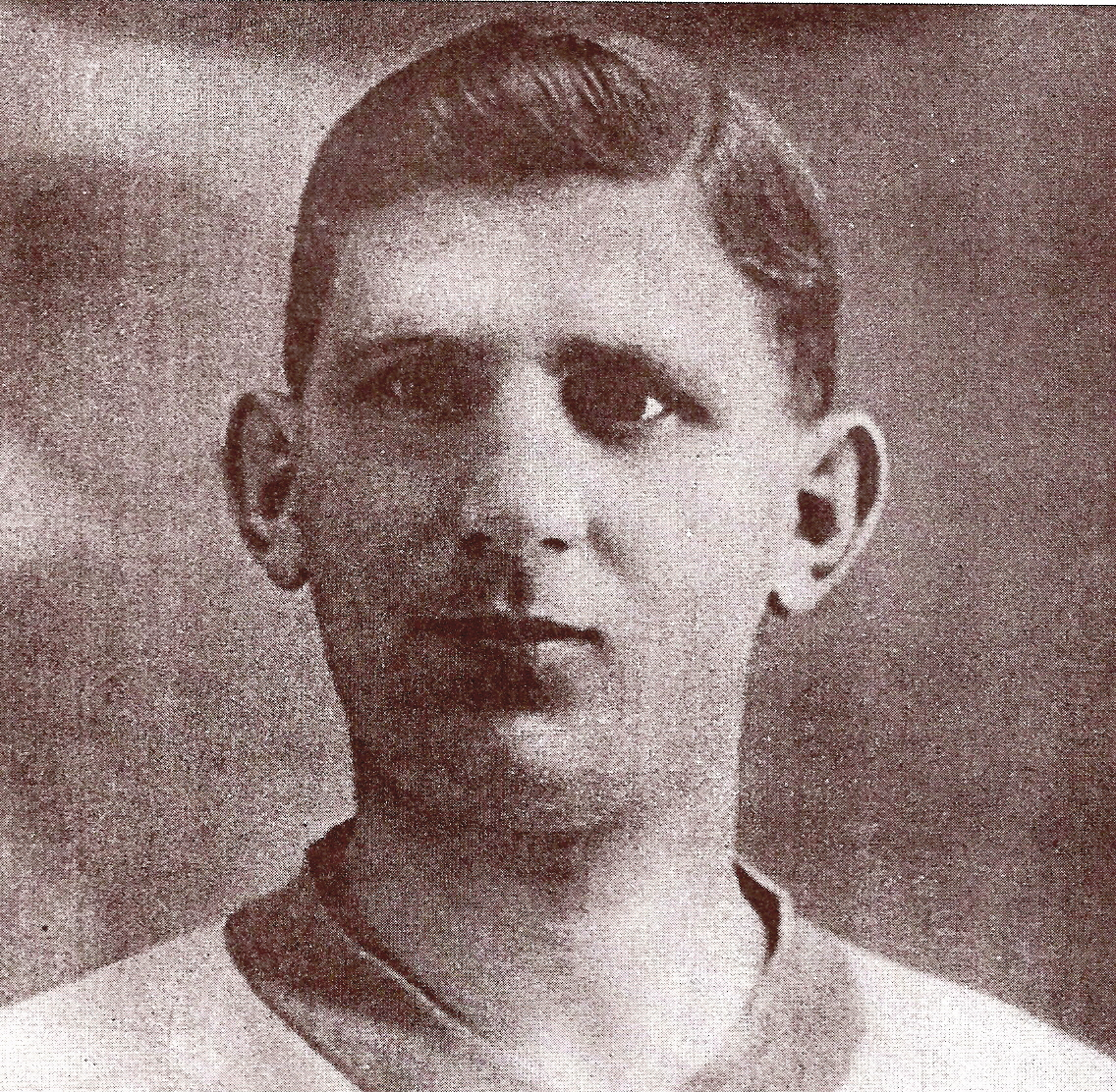
- Weisz in 1913

Personal information
- Full name: Ferenc Weisz
- Date of birth: 23 February 1885
- Date of death: 8 July 1944 (aged 59)
- Place of death: Auschwitz concentration camp, Poland
- Position: Striker

Senior career*
| Years | Team | Apps | (Gls) |
| 1902–1920 | Ferencváros | 186 | (105) |
| 1915 | → MTK (loan) | 2 | (0) |

International career
| 1903–1917 | Hungary | 17 | (3) |

Managerial career
- 1920–1922: Újpest
- * Club domestic league appearances and goals

Ferenc Weisz (23 February 1885 – 8 July 1944) was a Hungarian football player and manager. Weisz, who was Jewish, played club football as a striker for Ferencváros and MTK, winning the Hungarian league nine times. He also represented his country at international level, earning 17 caps between 1903 and 1917. After retiring as a player in 1920, Weisz became manager of Újpest between 1920 and 1922.

Weisz was deported with his wife from the Budapest outskirts to Auschwitz concentration camp in 1944, where he was murdered.
