= Jenő Károly =

Hungarian footballer and manager

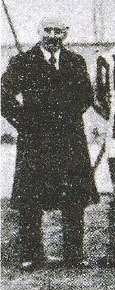
- Károly with Juventus in 1923–24 season

Personal information
- Date of birth: 15 January 1886
- Place of birth: Budapest, Hungary
- Date of death: 28 July 1926 (aged 40)
- Positions: Forward; centre-half

Senior career*
Years	Team	Apps	(Gls)
1903–1910	MTK	93	(109)
1910–1921	BAK	75	(10)

International career
1903–1918	Hungary	25	(10)

Managerial career
- 1920–1923: Savona
- 1923–1926: Juventus
- * Club domestic league appearances and goals

Jenő Károly (15 January 1886 – 28 July 1926) was a Hungarian footballer and later manager born in Budapest. Outside his homeland he is particularly noted for being the first manager of Agnelli-era Juventus.

As a player, Károly appeared for two local Budapest clubs, including the powerful MTK Budapest. He was renowned for having a very high goals-to-game ratio. He also represented his country a number of times, including at the 1912 Summer Olympics.

== Honours ==
=== Player ===
MTK

- Nemzeti Bajnokság I: 1904, 1907-08
- Magyar Kupa: 1909-10

Individual

- Nemzeti Bajnokság I top scorer: 1903, 1905

=== Manager ===
Juventus

- Prima Divisione: 1925-26
