= Ignaz Sigl =

Austrian footballer (1902–1986)

Personal information
- Date of birth: 11 February 1902
- Date of death: 9 August 1986 (aged 84)
- Position: Midfielder

Senior career*
| Years | Team | Apps | (Gls) |
- Admira Wien
- SC Austro-Fiat Wien

International career
| 1925–1931 | Austria | 24 | (5) |
- * Club domestic league appearances and goals

Ignaz Sigl (11 February 1902 – 9 August 1986) was an Austrian footballer who played as a midfielder. He made 24 appearances for the Austria national team from 1925 to 1931.
