= Gáspár Borbás =

Hungarian footballer

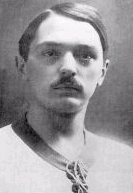

Personal information
- Date of birth: 26 July 1884
- Place of birth: Budapest, Hungary
- Date of death: 14 October 1976 (aged 92)
- Place of death: Budapest, Hungary
- Position: Left winger

Senior career*
Years	Team	Apps	(Gls)
1901–1904	Ferencváros	?	(?)
1904–1910	MAC Budapest	?	(?)
1910–1916	Ferencváros	?	(?)

International career
1903–1916	Hungary	41	(11)
- * Club domestic league appearances and goals

Gáspár Borbás (26 July 1884 – 14 October 1976) was a Hungarian amateur association football player who competed in the 1912 Summer Olympics. He was in the Hungarian Olympic squad and played one match in the main tournament as well as two matches in the consolation tournament.

He scored the first goal of the Hungary national team in 1903 against Bohemia. The fast left winger played 41 times in the national team and scored 11 goals between (1903 and 1916). He started his career in Ferencvaros, and he scored the club's first championship goal in 1901. On 1904 he went to MAC, but returned to the Ferencvaros in 1910. He ended his career in 1916.

He holds that scoring a goal is the responsibility of the internal strikers. Whatever celebration comes to the one who scores the winning goal, he passes that joy on to someone else. He misses a lot of goals when he only centers instead of a safe shot. He is the most famous Hungarian player. He is also considered the greatest abroad. On the news that he is playing, the opponent changes tactics and usually a player is assigned solely to catch him. (National Sports, October 31, 1908)
