= Vienna Cricket and Football-Club =

Sports club based in Vienna

Coordinates: 48°12′23.1″N 16°25′3.4″E

- Full name: Vienna Cricket and Football-Club
- Nickname: Cricketer
- Founded: 23 August 1894
- Ground: Cricketer-Platz

Vienna Cricket and Football-Club is a sports club based in Döbling district, Vienna, Austria. Established on 23 August 1894, it is the second oldest team after their rivals First Vienna FC 1894. It is familiarly known to Austrians by the English name Cricketer. In the early 20th century, the club was popular for cricket and football, but now athletics and tennis.

== Stadium ==
The stadium of the Vienna Cricket and Football Club is the Cricketer-Platz on Vorgartenstraße, which was built in 1904 on today's Meiereistraße. In 1908, the first international football match between Austria and Germany took place there.

== Honours ==
- Challenge Cup: 1897–98, 1901–02
