= List of FC Bayern Munich records and statistics =

This list has details on FC Bayern Munich records and statistics.

== Coaches ==
=== Until 1963 ===
Information on the club's coaches before the Bundesliga era is hard to come by. The information as given in the following table is from the club's website.

Coach	Period		Titles
Coach	From	Until	Titles
(Netherlands) Dr. Willem Hesselink	1902	1905	
(England) Thomas Taylor	1906	1909	
(England) George Hoer	1909	1911	
(England) Charles Griffiths	1911	1912	
(England) William James Townley	1913	1921	
(Hungary) Izidor Kürschner	1921	1922	
(Scotland) James McPherson	1925	1926	
(Hungary) Leo Weisz	1926	1928	
(Hungary) Kálmán Konrád	1928	1930	
(Austria) Richard Dombi	1930	1933	1 Championship
(Germany) Hans Tauchert	1933	1934	
(Germany) Ludwig Hofmann	1934	1935	
(Germany) Dr. Richard Michalke	1936	1937	
(Germany) Heinz Körner	1937	1938	
(Germany) Ludwig Goldbrunner	1938	1943	
(Germany) Konrad Heidkamp	1943	1945	
(Hungary) Alfred Schaffer	1945		
(Germany) Richard Högg	1946		
(Germany) Josef Pöttinger	1946	1947	
(Germany) Franz Dietl	1947	1948	
(Germany) Alv Riemke	1948	1950	
(England) David Davison	1950		
(Germany) Konrad Heidkamp (Germany) Herbert Moll	1951		
(Germany) Dr. Max Schäfer	1951	1953	
(Germany) Georg Bayerer	1953	1954	
(Germany) Georg Knöpfle	1954		
(Germany) Jakob Streitle	1955		
(Germany) Willibald Hahn	1956	1957	1 Cup
(Germany) Herbert Moll	1957	1958	
(Austria) Adolf Patek	1958	1961	
(Germany) Helmut Schneider	1961	1963	
(Germany) Herbert Erhardt	1963		

=== Since 1963 ===
In contrast to the pre-Bundesliga era, a list of coaches since the inception of the national league (Bundesliga) in 1963 is readily available on the club's website. Felix Magath (in 2005), Ottmar Hitzfeld (in 2008), Louis van Gaal (in 2010), Jupp Heynckes (in 2013 and 2018) and Hansi Flick (in 2020) were all awarded Germany's Football Manager of the Year title for their work at Bayern. Both Hitzfeld (in 2001) and Flick (in 2020) were also awarded the UEFA Coach of the Year and the IFFHS World's Best Club Coach, while Heynckes won both the FIFA World Coach of the Year and the IFFHS World's Best Club Coach title in 2013.

No.	Coach	Period			League Record						Major Titles	Domestic				European				Worldwide	
No.	Coach	From	Until	Days	Pld	W	D	L	GF	GA	Major Titles	BL	DP	LP	SC	CL	EL	SC	WC	ICC	CWC
1	(Socialist Federal Republic of Yugoslavia) Zlatko Čajkovski	1 July 1963	30 June 1968	1,826	102	52	18	32	211	170	3	—	2	—	—	—	—	—	1	—	—
2	(Socialist Federal Republic of Yugoslavia) Branko Zebec	1 July 1968	13 March 1970	620	58	32	14	12	117	56	2	1	1	—	—	—	—	—	—	—	—
3	(Germany) Udo Lattek	14 March 1970	2 January 1975	1,755	163	102	33	28	424	202	5	3	1	—	—	1	—	—	—	—	—
4	(Germany) Dettmar Cramer	16 January 1975	30 November 1977	1,049	101	40	27	34	205	180	3	—	—	—	—	2	—	—	—	1	—
5	(Hungary) Gyula Lóránt	2 December 1977	28 February 1979	453	38	16	10	12	72	57	—	—	—	—	—	—	—	—	—	—	—
6	(Hungary) Pál Csernai	1 March 1979	16 May 1983	1,537	147	87	31	29	346	173	3	2	1	—	—	—	—	—	—	—	—
7	(Germany) Reinhard Saftig (caretaker)	17 May 1983	30 June 1983	44	3	1	1	1	7	7	—	—	—	—	—	—	—	—	—	—	—
8	(Germany) Udo Lattek	1 July 1983	30 June 1987	1,460	136	82	35	19	313	141	5	3	2	—	—	—	—	—	—	—	—
9	(Germany) Jupp Heynckes	1 July 1987	8 October 1991	1,560	148	82	40	26	303	157	4	2	—	—	2	—	—	—	—	—	—
10	(Denmark) Søren Lerby	9 October 1991	10 March 1992	153	15	4	5	6	23	23	—	—	—	—	—	—	—	—	—	—	—
11	(Germany) Erich Ribbeck	11 March 1992	27 December 1993	656	65	31	20	14	137	89	—	—	—	—	—	—	—	—	—	—	—
12	(Germany) Franz Beckenbauer	28 December 1993	30 June 1994	184	14	9	2	3	26	14	1	1	—	—	—	—	—	—	—	—	—
13	(Italy) Giovanni Trapattoni	1 July 1994	30 June 1995	364	34	15	13	6	43	25	—	—	—	—	—	—	—	—	—	—	—
14	(Germany) Otto Rehhagel	1 July 1995	27 April 1996	301	30	18	4	8	58	37	—	—	—	—	—	—	—	—	—	—	—
15	(Germany) Franz Beckenbauer (caretaker)	29 April 1996	15 May 1996	16	3	1	0	2	6	7	1	—	—	—	—	—	1	—	—	—	—
16	(Germany) Klaus Augenthaler (caretaker)	16 May 1996	30 June 1996	45	1	0	1	0	2	2	1	—	—	—	—	—	—	—	—	—	—
17	(Italy) Giovanni Trapattoni	1 July 1996	30 June 1998	729	68	29	20	9	137	81	3	1	1	1	—	—	—	—	—	—	—
18	(Germany) Ottmar Hitzfeld	1 July 1998	30 June 2004	2,191	204	128	41	35	425	181	11	4	2	3	—	1	—	—	—	1	—
19	(Germany) Felix Magath	1 July 2004	31 January 2007	944	87	56	18	13	174	87	5	2	2	1	—	—	—	—	—	—	—
20	(Germany) Ottmar Hitzfeld	1 February 2007	30 June 2008	515	49	30	12	7	91	39	3	1	1	1	—	—	—	—	—	—	—
21	(Germany) Jürgen Klinsmann	1 July 2008	27 April 2009	300	29	16	6	7	59	37	—	—	—	—	—	—	—	—	—	—	—
22	(Germany) Jupp Heynckes (caretaker)	28 April 2009	30 June 2009	63	5	4	1	0	12	5	—	—	—	—	—	—	—	—	—	—	—
23	(Netherlands) Louis van Gaal	1 July 2009	9 April 2011	647	63	35	17	11	133	66	3	1	1	—	1	—	—	—	—	—	—
24	(Netherlands) Andries Jonker (caretaker)	10 April 2011	30 June 2011	81	5	4	1	0	20	5	—	—	—	—	—	—	—	—	—	—	—
25	(Germany) Jupp Heynckes	1 July 2011	30 June 2013	730	68	52	8	8	175	40	4	1	1	—	1	1	—	—	—	—	—
26	(Spain) Pep Guardiola	1 July 2013	30 June 2016	1,095	102	82	11	9	254	58	7	3	2	—	—	—	—	1	—	—	1
27	(Italy) Carlo Ancelotti	1 July 2016	28 September 2017	454	40	29	8	3	103	27	3	1	—	—	2	—	—	—	—	—	—
28	(France) Willy Sagnol (caretaker)	28 September 2017	8 October 2017	10	1	0	1	0	2	2	—	—	—	—	—	—	—	—	—	—	—
29	(Germany) Jupp Heynckes	9 October 2017	30 June 2018	264	27	23	1	3	76	21	1	1	—	—	—	—	—	—	—	—	—
30	(Croatia) Niko Kovač	1 July 2018	3 November 2019	490	44	29	9	6	113	48	3	1	1	—	1	—	—	—	—	—	—
31	(Germany) Hansi Flick	4 November 2019	30 June 2021	604	58	45	7	6	174	60	7	2	1	—	1	1	—	1	—	—	1
32	(Germany) Julian Nagelsmann	1 July 2021	24 March 2023	631	59	39	12	8	169	64	3	1	—	—	2	—	—	—	—	—	—
33	(Germany) Thomas Tuchel	24 March 2023	18 May 2024	421	43	29	4	10	114	56	1	1	—	—	—	—	—	—	—	—	—
34	(Belgium) Vincent Kompany	29 May 2024	Present	905	78	59	16	3	249	78	5	2	1	—	2	—	—	—	—	—	—

== Presidents ==
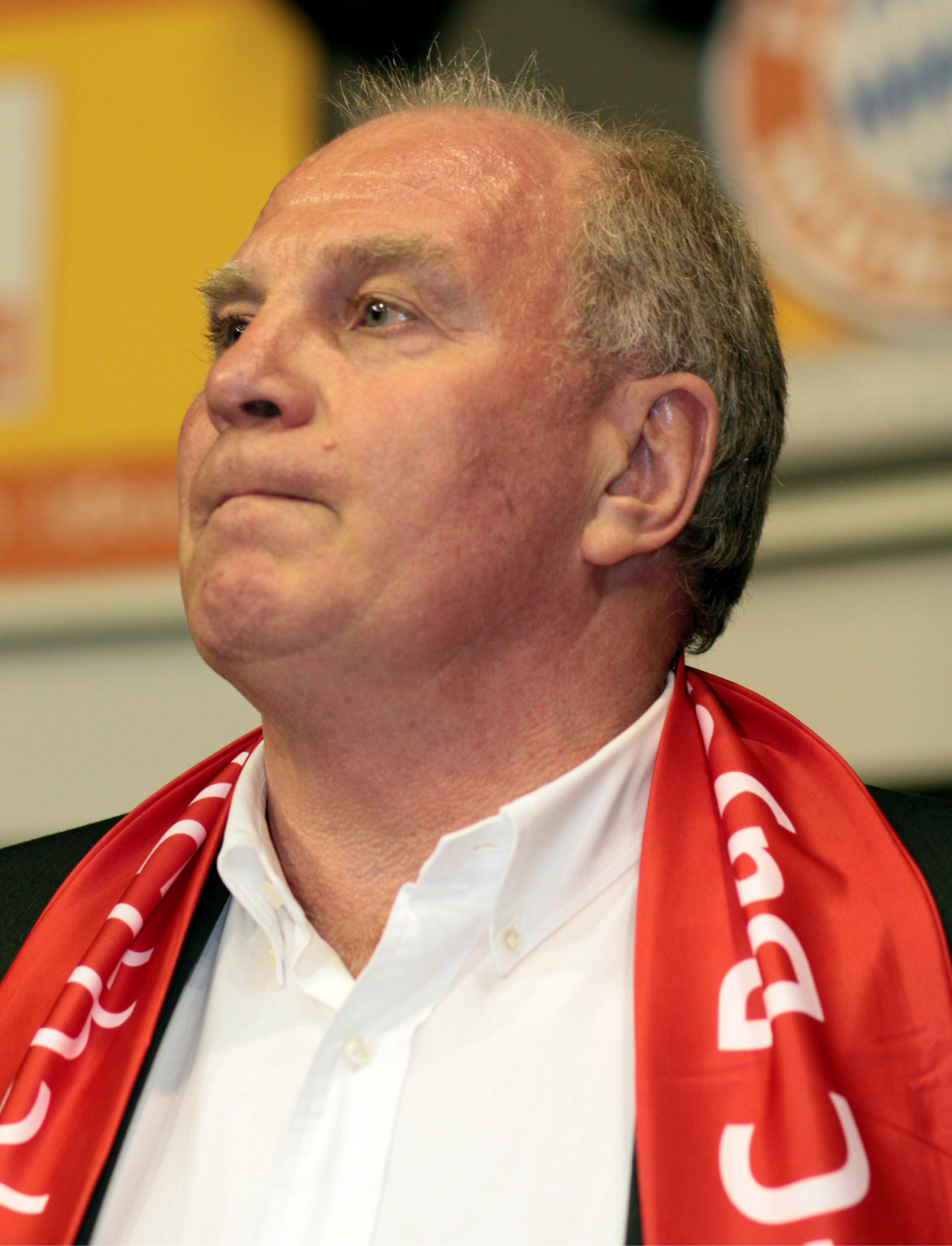
Former player, general manager, and president Uli Hoeneß

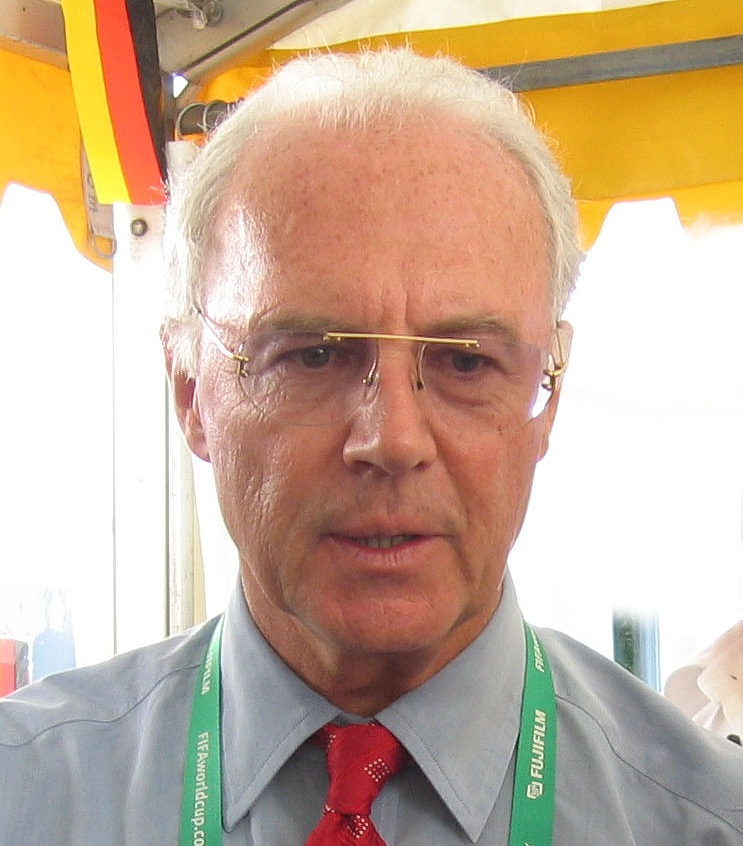
Former player, manager, and president Franz Beckenbauer

At the club's founding Franz John was appointed as the first president. The current president, Herbert Hainer, is Bayern's 38th president with several presidents having multiple spells in office (counted separately.)

Era	President
1900–1903	Franz John
1903–1906	Dr. Willem Hesselink
1906–1907	Dr. Angelo Knorr
1907–1908	Dr. Kurt Müller
1908–1909	Dr. Angelo Knorr
1909–1910	Otto Wagner
1910–1913	Dr. Angelo Knorr
1913–1914	Kurt Landauer
1914–1915	Fred Dunn
1915	Hans Tusch
1915	Fritz Meier
1916	Hans Bermühler
1916–1919	Fritz Meier
1919–1921	Kurt Landauer
1921–1922	Fred Dunn
1922–1933	Kurt Landauer
1933–1934	Siegfried Hermann
1934–1935	Dr. Karl-Heinz Oettinger
1935–1937	Dr. Richard Amesmeier
1937–1938	Franz Nußhardt
1938–1943	Josef Kellner (Alias Dr. Franz Kellner)
1943–1945	Josef Sauter
1945	Franz Xaver Heilmannseder
1945	Josef Bayer
1945–1947	Siegfried Hermann
1947–1951	Kurt Landauer
1951–1953	Julius Scheuring
1953–1955	Adolf Fischer
1955	Karl Wild
1955	Hugo Theisinger
1955–1958	Alfred Reitlinger
1958–1962	Roland Endler
1962–1979	Wilhelm Neudecker
1979–1985	Willi O. Hoffmann
1985–1994	Prof. Dr. Fritz Scherer
1994–2009	Franz Beckenbauer
2009–2014	Uli Hoeneß
2014–2016	Karl Hopfner
2016–2019	Uli Hoeneß
2019–present	Herbert Hainer

=== Honorary presidents ===
The club has six honorary presidents, Franz John, Siegfried Herrmann, Kurt Landauer, Wilhelm Neudecker, Franz Beckenbauer, and Uli Hoeneß, the only living one being Hoeneß. Bayern has also designated honorary vice presidents: Hans Schiefele, Karl Pfab, Bernd Rauch, and Fritz Scherer.

== Honours ==
Bayern have won 88 major trophies: 74 national titles and 14 international titles.

=== National titles ===
==== Official ====
- German Champions/Bundesliga
  - Champions: (35) 1932, 1968–69, 1971–72, 1972–73, 1973–74, 1979–80, 1980–81, 1984–85, 1985–86, 1986–87, 1988–89, 1989–90, 1993–94, 1996–97, 1998–99, 1999–2000, 2000–01, 2002–03, 2004–05, 2005–06, 2007–08, 2009–10, 2012–13, 2013–14, 2014–15, 2015–16, 2016–17, 2017–18, 2018–19, 2019–20, 2020–21, 2021–22, 2022–23, 2024–25, 2025–26 (record)
  - Runners-up: (10) 1969–70, 1970–71, 1987–88, 1990–91, 1992–93, 1995–96, 1997–98, 2003–04, 2008–09, 2011–12 (record)
- DFB-Pokal
  - Champions: (21) 1956–57, 1965–66, 1966–67, 1968–69, 1970–71, 1981–82, 1983–84, 1985–86, 1997–98, 1999–2000, 2002–03, 2004–05, 2005–06, 2007–08, 2009–10, 2012–13, 2013–14, 2015–16, 2018–19, 2019–20, 2025–26 (record)
  - Runners-up: 1984–85, 1998–99, 2011–12, 2017–18
  - Semi-finals: 1967–68, 1973–74, 1975–76, 2001–02, 2010–11, 2014–15, 2016–17
  - Quarter-finals: 1969–70, 1971–72, 1972–73, 1976–77, 1987–88, 1996–97, 2003–04, 2008–09, 2022–23
  - Round of 16: 1986–87, 1988–89, 1989–90, 1993–94, 2006–07, 2024–25
  - Round 3: 1974–75, 1977–78, 1979–80, 1980–81
  - Round 2: 1938–39, 1978–79, 1982–83, 1991–92, 1992–93, 1995–96, 2000–01, 2020–21, 2021–22, 2023–24
  - Round 1: 1935–36, 1936–37, 1940–41, 1943–44, 1990–91, 1994–95
  - Did not enter: (16) 1937–38, 1939–40, 1941–42, 1942–43, 1952–53, 1953–54, 1954–55, 1955–56, 1957–58, 1958–59, 1959–60, 1960–61, 1961–62, 1962–63, 1963–64, 1964–65
- DFB/DFL/Franz Beckenbauer Supercup (1987–present; inactive 1997–2009)
  - Champions: (12) 1987, 1990, 2010, 2012, 2016, 2017, 2018, 2020, 2021, 2022, 2025, 2026 (record)
  - Runners-up: 1989, 1994, 2013, 2014, 2015, 2019, 2023 (record)
- DFB/DFL-Ligapokal (1997–2007)
  - Champions: (6) 1997, 1998, 1999, 2000, 2004, 2007 (record)
  - Runners-up: 2006
  - Semi-finals: 2001, 2003, 2005
  - Group stage: 1972–73
  - Preliminary round: 2002

==== Unofficial ====
- Fuji-Cup (1986–1996; The competition competed with the DFB-Supercup, although ultimately the two competitions were replaced by the DFB-Ligapokal in 1997. Nowadays there is a similar competition named Telekom Cup.)
  - Champions: 1986, 1987, 1988, 1994, 1995
  - Runners-up: 1993, 1996
  - Third-place: 1989, 1990, 1991*
- Telekom Cup (formerly known as T-Home Cup and LIGA total! Cup; since 2009)
  - Champions: 2013, 2014, 2017 (winter), 2017 (summer)
  - Runners-up: 2010
  - Third-place: 2009, 2011, 2012
  - Fourth-place: 2015

=== International titles ===
Bayern is one of only five clubs to have won all three major European competitions played until 2021. Bayern are also one of three clubs to have won the European Cup three times in a row, entitling them to wear a multiple-winner badge during Champions League matches.

- European Cup / UEFA Champions League
  - Champions: 1973–74, 1974–75, 1975–76, 2000–01, 2012–13, 2019–20 (German record)
  - Runners-up: 1981–82, 1986–87, 1998–99, 2009–10, 2011–12
  - Semi-finals: 1980–81, 1989–90, 1990–91, 1994–95, 1999–2000, 2013–14, 2014–15, 2015–16, 2017–18, 2023–24, 2025–26
  - Quarter-finals: 1972–73, 1976–77, 1985–86, 1987–88, 1997–98, 2001–02, 2004–05, 2006–07, 2008–09, 2016–17, 2020–21, 2021–22, 2022–23, 2024–25
  - Round of 16: 2003–04, 2005–06, 2010–11, 2018–19
- UEFA Cup / UEFA Europa League
  - Champions: 1995–96
  - Semi-finals: 1979–80, 1988–89, 2007–08
- Inter-Cities Fairs Cup
  - Quarter-finals: 1962–63, 1970–71
- European / UEFA Cup Winners' Cup
  - Champions: 1966–67 (Shared German record)
  - Semi-finals: 1967–68, 1971–72, 1984–85
  - Quarter-finals: 1982–83
- European / UEFA Super Cup
  - Champions: 2013, 2020 (German record)
  - Finalist: 1974 (did not play) (Competition was abandoned because Bayern Munich and 1. FC Magdeburg could not find a mutually convenient date for the match)
  - Runners-up: 1975, 1976, 2001 (German record)
- Intercontinental Cup
  - Champions: 1976, 2001 (German record)
  - Finalist: 1974, 1975 (did not play) (Bayern refused to participate in the tournament these years; they were replaced by Atlético Madrid in 1974 and the Intercontinental Cup was not played at all in 1975)
- FIFA Club World Cup
  - Champions: 2013, 2020 (German record)
  - Quarter-finals: 2025

=== Regional competitions ===
- Regionale Meisterschaft Bayern (Oberbayern) (I), Münchner Stadtmeisterschaft
  - Champions: 1902, 1903, 1904, 1905, 1906, 1908
- Kreisliga Bayern - Level 1 (1909–1923)
  - Champions: 1910, 1911, 1920, 1923;
  - Runners-up: 1912, 1913, 1917, 1918 (record)
- Bezirksliga Bayern - Level 1 (1923–1933)
  - Champions: 1925–26, 1927–28, 1928–29, 1929–30, 1930–31, 1931–32, 1932–33 (record)
- Gauliga Bayern - Level 1 (1933–1945)
  - Champions: 1943–44
- Southern German football championship - Level 1
  - Champions: 1925–26, 1927–28
  - Runners-up: 1909–10, 1910–11, 1928–29, 1931–32
- Regionalliga Süd - Level 2 (1963–74)
  - Champions: 1964–65
  - Runners-up: 1963–64

=== International friendly competitions ===
- Singapore Trophy
  - Champions: 2023
- Audi Cup
  - Champions: 2009, 2013, 2015 (record)
  - Runners-up: 2011, 2019
- International Champions Cup
  - Runners-up: 2017
- Franz Beckenbauer Cup
  - Runners-up: 2007, 2008, 2010
- Opel Master Cup
  - Champions: 1996, 2000 (shared record)
  - Runners-up: 1997
- Uli Hoeneß Cup
  - Champions: 2013
- Saitama City Cup
  - Champions: 2008
  - Runners-up: 2006
- Trofeo Santiago Bernabéu
  - Champions: 1979, 1980, 2002
  - Runners-up: 1985
- Teresa Herrera Trophy
  - Champions: 1989
- Orange Trophy
  - Champions: 1972
- Yingli Cup
  - Champions: 2012
- Audi Football Summit
  - Champions: 2011, 2012, 2014, 2015
- Wiener Stadthallenturnier
  - Champions: 1971
- Trofeo Ciudad de Las Palmas
  - Champions: 1972
- Trofeo 75 Aniversario del Athletic de Bilbao
  - Champions: 1973
- Trofeo Internacional Ciudad de Terrassa
  - Champions: 1973
- Toulouse Tournament
  - Champions: 1979
- Mohammed V Trophy
  - Champions: 1972
  - Runners-up: 1969
- Tournoi de Paris
  - Runners-up: 1973

=== Honours and awards ===
- FIFA Club of the Century
  - 3rd place (20th century)
- German Sportsteam of the Year
  - Winner: 1967, 2001, 2013, 2020
- IFFHS World Club Team of the Year
  - Winner: 2013, 2020
- IFFHS World Club Team of the Month
  - Winner: February 2000, October 2001, August 2002, February 2008, April 2008, April 2010, September 2011, September 2012, February 2013
- FIFA Club World Cup Fair Play Trophy
  - Winner: 2013
- France Football European Team of the Year
  - Winner: 1974
- World Soccer Team of the Year
  - Winner: 2013, 2020
- Globe Soccer Awards Best Club of the Year
  - Winner: 2013, 2020
- Gazzetta Sports World Team of the Year
  - Winner: 2013, 2020
- Laureus World Sports Award for Team of the Year
  - Winner: 2014, 2021
- Silver Bay Leaf
  - Winner: 1967

=== FC Bayern Munich II ===
- Regionalliga Süd (III)
  - Champions: 2004
- 3. Liga (III)
  - Champions: 2020
- 2nd Amateurliga Oberbayern A (IV)
  - Champions: 1956
- Landesliga Bayern-Süd (IV)
  - Champions: 1967, 1973
- Regionalliga Bayern (IV)
  - Champions: 2014, 2019
  - Runners-up: 2013, 2015
- Bavarian Cup
  - Winners: 2002
- Oberbayern Cup
  - Winners: 1995, 2001, 2002
- IFA Shield
  - Winners: 2005
- Premier League International Cup
  - Winners: 2019
- German amateur football championship
  - Runners-up: 1983, 1987
- Amateurliga Südbayern (III)
  - Runners-up: 1958, 1961
- Amateur Oberliga Bayern (III)
  - Runners-up: 1983, 1984, 1987

=== FC Bayern Munich junior team ===
- Under 19 Bundesliga
  - Winners: 2001, 2002, 2004
  - Runners-up: 1998, 2006, 2007, 2012, 2017
- Under 17 Bundesliga
  - Winners: 1989, 1997, 2001, 2007, 2017
  - Runners-up: 2000, 2009
- South/Southwest German Under 19 championship
  - Winners: 2004, 2007, 2012, 2013
- South/Southwest German Under 17 championship
  - Winners: 2009
- Southern German Under 19 championship
  - Winners: 1950, 1954
- Southern German Under 15 championship
  - Winners: 1982, 1985, 1987, 1990, 1991
- Under 19 Bayernliga
  - Winners: 1950, 1954, 1966, 1972, 1973, 1981, 1985, 1987, 1991, 1992, 1994, 1995, 1996
  - Runners-up: 1946, 1960, 1964, 1980, 1999^{‡}
- Under 17 Bayernliga
  - Winners: 1976, 1978, 1983, 1985, 1986, 1988, 1989, 1993, 1994, 1997, 1998, 2000, 2010^{‡}, 2014^{‡}
  - Runners-up: 1982, 1987, 1990, 1992, 1996, 2012^{‡}, 2015^{‡}
- Under 15 Bayernliga
  - Winners: 1975, 1978, 1982, 1985, 1987, 1990, 1991, 1994, 1995, 2007, 2009
  - Runners-up: 1976, 1977, 1988, 1992, 2008
- Weifang Cup
  - Runners-up: 2006 (U-15)
- ^{‡} Reserve team

=== Honours for players ===
Honour	Player(s)	Year(s)
European Sportsperson of the Year; Title awarded since 1958	Robert Lewandowski	2020
Ballon d'Or; Title awarded from 1956 to 2009, and since 2016	Gerd Müller	1970
Ballon d'Or; Title awarded from 1956 to 2009, and since 2016	Franz Beckenbauer	1972, 1976
Ballon d'Or; Title awarded from 1956 to 2009, and since 2016	Karl-Heinz Rummenigge	1980, 1981
Ballon d'Or; Title awarded from 1956 to 2009, and since 2016	Harry Kane	2026
Ballon d'Or (2nd); Title awarded from 1956 to 2009, and since 2016	Gerd Müller	1972
Ballon d'Or (2nd); Title awarded from 1956 to 2009, and since 2016	Franz Beckenbauer	1974, 1975
Ballon d'Or (2nd); Title awarded from 1956 to 2009, and since 2016	Karl-Heinz Rummenigge	1979
Ballon d'Or (2nd); Title awarded from 1956 to 2009, and since 2016	Paul Breitner	1981
Ballon d'Or (2nd); Title awarded from 1956 to 2009, and since 2016	Jürgen Klinsmann	1995
Ballon d'Or (2nd); Title awarded from 1956 to 2009, and since 2016	Robert Lewandowski	2021
Ballon d'Or (3rd); Title awarded from 1956 to 2009, and since 2016	Franz Beckenbauer	1966
Ballon d'Or (3rd); Title awarded from 1956 to 2009, and since 2016	Gerd Müller	1969, 1973
Ballon d'Or (3rd); Title awarded from 1956 to 2009, and since 2016	Oliver Kahn	2001, 2002
Ballon d'Or Dream Team; Title awarded only once	Franz Beckenbauer	2020
Ballon d'Or Dream Team; Title awarded only once	Lothar Matthäus	2020
FIFA Order of Merit; Title awarded from 1984 to 2012	Franz Beckenbauer	1984, 2004
FIFA Order of Merit; Title awarded from 1984 to 2012	Gerd Müller	1998
The Best FIFA Men's Player; Title awarded since 2016	Robert Lewandowski	2020, 2021
FIFA World Player of the Year (2nd); Title awarded from 1991 to 2009	Oliver Kahn	2002
FIFA World Player of the Year (3rd); Title awarded from 1991 to 2009	Jürgen Klinsmann	1995
FIFA Ballon d'Or (3rd); Title awarded from 2010 to 2015, after Ballon d'Or and FIFA World Player of the Year awards were merged	Franck Ribéry	2013
FIFA Ballon d'Or (3rd); Title awarded from 2010 to 2015, after Ballon d'Or and FIFA World Player of the Year awards were merged	Manuel Neuer	2014
UEFA Club Footballer of the Year; Title awarded from 1998 to 2010	Stefan Effenberg	2001
UEFA Best Player in Europe/UEFA Men's Player of the Year; Title awarded since 2011	Franck Ribéry	2013
UEFA Best Player in Europe/UEFA Men's Player of the Year; Title awarded since 2011	Robert Lewandowski	2020
Best European Goalkeeper; Title awarded since 1991	Oliver Kahn	1999, 2000, 2001, 2002
Best European Goalkeeper; Title awarded since 1991	Manuel Neuer	2013, 2014, 2015, 2020
UEFA Champions League Best Goalkeeper; Title awarded from 1998 to 2010, and 2017 to 2021	Oliver Kahn	1999, 2000, 2001, 2002
UEFA Champions League Best Goalkeeper; Title awarded from 1998 to 2010, and 2017 to 2021	Manuel Neuer	2020
UEFA Champions League Best Defender; Title awarded from 1998 to 2010, and 2017 to 2021	Joshua Kimmich	2020
UEFA Champions League Best Forward; Title awarded from 1998 to 2010, and 2017 to 2021	Robert Lewandowski	2020
Onze d'Or; Title awarded since 1976	Karl-Heinz Rummenigge	1980, 1981
Bravo Award; Title awarded since 1978	Owen Hargreaves	2001
Bravo Award; Title awarded since 1978	Thomas Müller	2010
Golden Boy; Title awarded since 2003	Renato Sanches	2016
FIFA World Cup Golden Ball; Title awarded since 1982	Oliver Kahn	2002
FIFA World Cup Golden Glove; Title awarded since 1994	Oliver Kahn	2002
FIFA World Cup Golden Glove; Title awarded since 1994	Manuel Neuer	2014
FIFA World Cup Best Young Player; Title awarded since 1958	Franz Beckenbauer	1966
FIFA World Cup Best Young Player; Title awarded since 1958	Lukas Podolski	2006
FIFA World Cup Best Young Player; Title awarded since 1958	Thomas Müller	2010
FIFA World Cup All-Time Team; Title awarded only once	Franz Beckenbauer	1994
FIFA World Cup All-Time Team; Title awarded only once	Paul Breitner	1994
IFFHS World's Best Player; Title awarded from 1988 to 1990, and since 2020	Robert Lewandowski	2020, 2021
IFFHS World's Best Goalkeeper; Title awarded since 1987	Jean-Marie Pfaff	1987
IFFHS World's Best Goalkeeper; Title awarded since 1987	Oliver Kahn	1999, 2001, 2002
IFFHS World's Best Goalkeeper; Title awarded since 1987	Manuel Neuer	2013, 2014, 2015, 2016, 2020
IFFHS World's Best Goalkeeper of the Decade (2011–2020); Title awarded only once	Manuel Neuer	2021
IFFHS Best European Player (1956–1990); Title awarded only once	Franz Beckenbauer	1990
IFFHS Goalkeeper of the Century (4th); Title awarded only once	Sepp Maier	20th century
Footballer of the Year (Germany); Title awarded since 1960	Franz Beckenbauer	1966, 1968, 1974, 1976
Footballer of the Year (Germany); Title awarded since 1960	Gerd Müller	1967, 1969
Footballer of the Year (Germany); Title awarded since 1960	Sepp Maier	1975, 1977, 1978
Footballer of the Year (Germany); Title awarded since 1960	Karl-Heinz Rummenigge	1980
Footballer of the Year (Germany); Title awarded since 1960	Paul Breitner	1981
Footballer of the Year (Germany); Title awarded since 1960	Lothar Matthäus	1999
Footballer of the Year (Germany); Title awarded since 1960	Oliver Kahn	2000, 2001
Footballer of the Year (Germany); Title awarded since 1960	Michael Ballack	2003, 2005
Footballer of the Year (Germany); Title awarded since 1960	Franck Ribéry	2008
Footballer of the Year (Germany); Title awarded since 1960	Arjen Robben	2010
Footballer of the Year (Germany); Title awarded since 1960	Bastian Schweinsteiger	2013
Footballer of the Year (Germany); Title awarded since 1960	Manuel Neuer	2014
Footballer of the Year (Germany); Title awarded since 1960	Jérôme Boateng	2016
Footballer of the Year (Germany); Title awarded since 1960	Philipp Lahm	2017
Footballer of the Year (Germany); Title awarded since 1960	Robert Lewandowski	2020, 2021
Footballer of the Year (Germany); Title awarded since 1960	Harry Kane	2026
Austrian Footballer of the Year; Title awarded since 1984	David Alaba	2011, 2012, 2013, 2014, 2015, 2016, 2020, 2021
Austrian Footballer of the Year; Title awarded since 1984	Konrad Laimer	2025
Austrian Sports Personality of the Year; Title awarded since 1949	David Alaba	2013, 2014
Canadian Men's Player of the Year; Title awarded since 1993	Alphonso Davies	2020, 2021, 2022
Croatian Footballer of the Year; Title awarded since 1991	Ivica Olić	2009, 2010
Croatian Footballer of the Year; Title awarded since 1991	Mario Mandžukić	2012, 2013
Croatian Sportsman of the Year; Title awarded since 1952	Mario Mandžukić	2013
Danish Football Player of the Year; Title awarded since 1963	Brian Laudrup	1992
Dutch Sportsman of the year Title awarded since 1951	Arjen Robben	2014
England Senior Men's Player of the Year; Title awarded since 2003	Owen Hargreaves	2006
French Player of the Year; Title awarded since 1959	Franck Ribéry	2008, 2013
Ghana Player of the Year; Title awarded since 1975	Samuel Kuffour	1998, 1999, 2001
Paraguayan Footballer of the Year; Title awarded since 1997	Roque Santa Cruz	1999
Polish Footballer of the Year; Title awarded since 1973	Robert Lewandowski	2014, 2015, 2016, 2017, 2019, 2020, 2021
Polish Sports Personality of the Year; Title awarded since 1926	Robert Lewandowski	2015, 2020, 2021
Swedish Footballer of the Year; Title awarded since 1946	Patrik Andersson	2001
Asian Footballer of the Year; Title awarded since 1988	Ali Daei	1999
BBC African Footballer of the Year; Title awarded since 1991	Samuel Kuffour	2001
CAF African Footballer of the Year; Title awarded since 1992	Sadio Mané	2022
CONCACAF Men's Player of the Year; Title awarded since 2013	Alphonso Davies	2021, 2022

Top Scorers

European Golden Shoe winners (Top Scorer in Europe)
Player	Year(s) (Goals)
Gerd Müller	1970 (38), 1972 (40)
Robert Lewandowski	2021 (41), 2022 (35)
Harry Kane	2024 (36), 2026 (36)
UEFA Champions League top scorers
Player	Year(s) (Goals)
Gerd Müller	1973 (11), 1974 (8), 1975 (5), 1977 (5)
Karl-Heinz Rummenigge	1981 (6)
Dieter Hoeneß	1982 (7)
Robert Lewandowski	2020 (15)
Harry Kane	2024 (8)
UEFA Cup top scorers
Player	Year(s) (Goals)
Dieter Hoeneß	1980 (7)
Jürgen Klinsmann	1996 (15)
Luca Toni	2008 (10)
Bundesliga top scorers
Player	Year(s) (Goals)
Gerd Müller	1967 (28), 1969 (30), 1970 (38), 1972 (40), 1973 (36), 1974 (30), 1978 (24)
Karl-Heinz Rummenigge	1980 (26), 1981 (29), 1984 (26)
Roland Wohlfarth	1989 (17), 1991 (21)
Giovane Élber	2003 (21)
Luca Toni	2008 (24)
Mario Gómez	2011 (28)
Robert Lewandowski	2016 (30), 2018 (29), 2019 (22), 2020 (34), 2021 (41), 2022 (35)
Harry Kane	2024 (36), 2025 (26), 2026 (36)
Notes	1967: jointly w/ Lothar Emmerich (Borussia Dortmund); 1974: jointly w/ Jupp Heynckes (Borussia Mönchengladbach); 1977: jointly w/ Dieter Müller (1. FC Köln); 1989: jointly w/ Thomas Allofs (1. FC Köln); 2003: jointly w/ Thomas Christiansen (VfL Bochum) 2021: All-time Bundesliga single-season record.
FIFA World Cup Golden Boot
Player	Year(s) (goals)
Gerd Müller	1970 (10)
Miroslav Klose	2006 (5)
Thomas Müller	2010 (5)
All-time Top FIFA World Cup goalscorers
Player	Goals (Years)
Miroslav Klose	16 goals (2002–2006–2010–2014)
Gerd Müller	14 goals (1970–1974)
Harry Kane	14 goals (2018–2022–2026)
Thomas Müller	10 goals (2010–2014–2018–2022)

== World Cup winning players ==
The following FIFA World Cup winning players played for Bayern Munich at some point during their careers. Highlighted players were playing for Bayern Munich when they won the World Cup.

- (West Germany) Hans Bauer (Switzerland 1954)
- (West Germany) Karl Mai (Switzerland 1954)
- Franz Beckenbauer (West Germany 1974)^{*}
- Paul Breitner (West Germany 1974)
- Uli Hoeneß (West Germany 1974)
- Jupp Kapellmann (West Germany 1974)
- Sepp Maier (West Germany 1974)
- Gerd Müller (West Germany 1974)
- Georg Schwarzenbeck (West Germany 1974)
- (West Germany) Raimond Aumann (Italy 1990)
- (West Germany) Klaus Augenthaler (Italy 1990)
- (West Germany) Thomas Berthold (Italy 1990)
- (West Germany) Andreas Brehme (Italy 1990)
- (West Germany) Jürgen Klinsmann (Italy 1990)
- (West Germany) Jürgen Kohler (Italy 1990)
- (West Germany) Lothar Matthäus (Italy 1990)
- (West Germany) Hans Pflügler (Italy 1990)
- (West Germany) Stefan Reuter (Italy 1990)
- (West Germany) Olaf Thon (Italy 1990)
- (Brazil) Jorginho (United States 1994)
- (Brazil) Paulo Sérgio (United States 1994)
- Bixente Lizarazu (France 1998)
- (Brazil) Lúcio (South Korea–Japan 2002)
- (Italy) Massimo Oddo (Germany 2006)
- (Italy) Luca Toni (Germany 2006)
- (Spain) Xabi Alonso (South Africa 2010)
- (Spain) Javi Martínez (South Africa 2010)
- (Spain) Pepe Reina (South Africa 2010)
- (Germany) Jérôme Boateng (Brazil 2014)
- (Germany) Mario Götze (Brazil 2014)
- (Germany) Mats Hummels (Brazil 2014)
- (Germany) Miroslav Klose (Brazil 2014)
- (Germany) Toni Kroos (Brazil 2014)
- (Germany) Philipp Lahm (Brazil 2014)
- (Germany) Thomas Müller (Brazil 2014)
- (Germany) Manuel Neuer (Brazil 2014)
- (Germany) Lukas Podolski (Brazil 2014)
- (Germany) Bastian Schweinsteiger (Brazil 2014)
- (France) Corentin Tolisso (Russia 2018)
- (France) Benjamin Pavard (Russia 2018)
- (France) Lucas Hernandez (Russia 2018)

^{*} Franz Beckenbauer won the World Cup in 1974 as player and in 1990 as a coach. He was also a player and later a coach for Bayern Munich.

== All-time ==
=== Bundesliga ===
Statistics are accurate as of the 2026–27 Bundesliga season.

==== Seasons ====
- Most seasons in Bundesliga: 62 (shared with Werder Bremen)
- Most consecutive seasons in Bundesliga: 62 (1965–66 to 2026–27) (ongoing)

==== Titles ====
- Most Bundesliga titles won: 34
- Most consecutive Bundesliga titles won: 11 (2013 to 2023)

==== Champions ====
- Highest number of games left when becoming champions: 7 (2013–14)
- Earliest point of time in a year for a team to be crowned champions: 25 March (2013–14)
- Highest number of matchdays being league leaders in a season: 34 (1968–69, 1972–73, 1984–85, 2007–08, 2012–13 and 2025–26)
- Most matchdays at the first place of the Bundesliga table: 767

==== Points ====
- Most Bundesliga points: 4,238 (at the end of the 2025–26 season)
- Most points in a season: 91 (2012–13)
- Most points in a season opening half: 47 (2013–14 and 2025–26)
- Most points in a season closing half: 49 (2012–13 and 2019–20)
- Most points in a season away: 47 (2012–13)
- Highest percentage of total possible points in a season: 89.22 (2012–13) (91 points out of a possible 102)
- Highest percentage of total possible points in a season opening half: 92.16 (2013–14) (47 points out of a possible 51)
- Highest percentage of total possible points in a season closing half: 96.08 (2012–13 and 2019–20) (49 points out of a possible 51)
- Biggest lead in points after a season opening half: 11 (45) upon VfL Wolfsburg (34) (2014–15) and 11 (47) upon Borussia Dortmund (36) (2025–26)
- Highest points per game average in a season: 2.68 (2012–13)
- Most average points per game in the Bundesliga: 2.04 (4,238 points in 2,078 games)
- Highest number of points in a calendar year: 93 (2013)
- Championship with fewest points under the 3-point rule: 63 (2000–01)

==== Wins and losses ====
- Most Bundesliga wins: 1,265 (at the end of the 2025–26 season)
- Most consecutive wins in the Bundesliga: 19 (matchday 9 to 27 of 2013–14)
- Most wins in a single season: 29 (2012–13 and 2013–14)
- Most consecutive wins to start a season: 10 (2015–16)
- Highest number of wins in a calendar year: 30 (2013)
- Highest number of wins in a season opening half: 15 (2013–14, 2015–16 and 2025–26)
- Highest number of wins in a season closing half: 16 (2012–13 and 2019–20)
- Highest winning percentage: 60.88 (1,265 wins in 2,078 games)
- Highest percentage of wins in a season opening half: 88.24 (2013–14, 2015–16 and 2025–26) (15 wins in 17 games)
- Highest percentage of wins in a season closing half: 94.12 (2012–13 and 2019–20) (16 wins in 17 games)
- Most games won in a club's first Bundesliga season: 20 (1965–66) (shared with RB Leipzig)
- Biggest Bundesliga victory: 11–1 v. Borussia Dortmund (27 November 1971)
- Lowest number of losses in a calendar year: 0 (2013)
- Championship with the most losses in a season: 9 (2000–01)
- Biggest Bundesliga defeat: 0–7 v. Schalke 04 (9 October 1976)

==== Goals ====
- Most Bundesliga goals scored: 4,736 (at the end of the 2025–26 season)
- Most goals scored in a single season: 122 (2025–26)
- Most goals scored in a single season at home: 69 (1971–72)
- Most goals scored in a single season away: 54 (2025–26)
- Most goals scored in a season opening half: 66 (2025–26)
- Most goals scored in a season closing half: 56 (2025–26)
- Most goals scored in a calendar year: 116 (2021)
- Most consecutive games with at least one goal scored: 87 (matchday 22 of 2019–20 to matchday 6 of 2022–23)
- Lowest number of conceded goals in a season opening half: 4 (2014–15)
- Lowest number of conceded goals in a season closing half: 9 (2015–16)
- Fewest goals conceded in a single season: 17 (2015–16)
- Best goal difference: +2,471 (at the end of the 2025–26 season)
- Best goal difference in a single season: +86 (2025–26)
- Best goal difference in a season opening half: +53 (2025–26)
- Best goal difference in a season closing half: +44 (2019–20)
- Scoring in every game of the season (34 games): 2012–13, 2020–21, 2021–22 and 2025–26
- Highest number of clean sheets in a season: 21 (2012–13)

==== Runs ====
- Highest number of consecutive seasons in the Bundesliga: 62 (ongoing)
- Highest number of consecutive titles: 11
- Highest number of consecutive wins: 19 (matchday 9 to 27 of 2013–14)
- Highest number of consecutive wins from start of the season: 10 (2015–16)
- Highest number of consecutive wins from start of the season closing half: 14 (2012–13)
- Highest number of consecutive wins away: 11 (matchday 12 to 34 of 2019–20)
- Highest number of consecutive wins at home: 26 (matchday 16 of 1971–72 to matchday 32 of 1972–73)
- Highest number of consecutive wins at home in a season: 16 (matchday 2 to 32 of 1972–73)
- Highest number of consecutive games unbeaten away: 33 (matchday 32 of 2011–12 to matchday 27 of 2013–14)
- Highest number of consecutive games unbeaten at home: 73 (matchday 31 of 1969–70 to matchday 4 of 1974–75)
- Most consecutive games unbeaten in the Bundesliga: 53 (matchday 10 of 2012–13 season to matchday 28 of 2013–14)
- Most consecutive games with at least one goal scored: 87 (matchday 22 of 2019–20 to matchday 6 of 2022–23)
- Highest number of consecutive games scoring at least one goal away: 54 (matchday 2 of 2019–20 to matchday 5 of 2022–23)
- Highest number of consecutive games scoring at least one goal in a season: 34 (2012–13, 2020–21, 2021–22 and 2025–26)

==== Per match ====
- As an infamous record, Bayern's match in Dortmund in the 2000–01 season was the most ill-disciplined match in Bundesliga history with 15 cards shown (10 yellow, 1 yellow-red, 2 red), of those 12 (8, 1, 1) were shown to Bayern players which is also a record in Bundesliga history.

=== Other national records ===
- Most championships won: 35
- Most cups won: 21
- Most Supercups won: 12
- Most league cups won: 6
- Most doubles won: 14
- Most Bundesliga matches played: 2,078 (at the end of the 2025–26 season)
- Most seasons in European competition: 59 (as of 2026–27)
- Most consecutive seasons in European competition: 34 (1993–94 to 2026–27) (ongoing)
- Only club to win a seasonal treble (UEFA Champions League, Bundesliga and DFB-Pokal), in 2012–13 and 2019–20.
- Only club to win a domestic double (Bundesliga and DFB-Pokal) twice in a row, three times; in 2004–05 and 2005–06, in 2012–13 and 2013–14, and in 2018–19 and 2019–20.
- Only club to win a championship and a cup with both the men's and women's football department.
- Biggest professional victory: 16–1 v. DJK Waldberg (15 August 1997; DFB-Pokal)
  - Bayern Munich's biggest win in a friendly was a 27–0 victory against FC Rottach Egern on 18 July 2023.
- Biggest defeat:
  - 1–8 v. SpVgg Fürth (30 March 1952; Oberliga Süd)
  - 2–9 v. Stuttgarter Kickers (17 March 1957; Oberliga Süd)
  - 0–7 v. Schalke 04 (9 October 1976; Bundesliga)

=== Managerial ===
- Longest-serving manager by time: Udo Lattek, from 14 March 1970 to 2 January 1975 and 1 July 1983 to 30 June 1987 (8 years, 295 days)
- Longest-serving manager by matches: Udo Lattek managed the club for 420 matches over a period of eight years and nine months, from 14 March 1970 to 2 January 1975 and 1 July 1983 to 30 June 1987 (8 years, 295 days)
- Manager with most trophies: Ottmar Hitzfeld 14 (5x Bundesliga, 3x DFB-Pokal, 4x DFL-Ligapokal, UEFA Champions League, Intercontinental Cup)

=== International record ===
- Fastest goal in UEFA Champions League history: After 10.12 seconds by Roy Makaay against Real Madrid on 7 March 2007.
- Managed to score at least two goals in each match of the UEFA Champions League group stage on three occasions: 2010–11 group stage (after beating Basel 3–0 in the final game), and 2019–20 group stage (after beating Tottenham Hotspur 3–1 in the final game), and 2021–22 group stage (after beating Barcelona 3–0 in the final game).
- Only German club to win all six games in a group stage of the UEFA Champions League: 2019–20, 2021–22 and 2022–23.
- Largest aggregate win in the UEFA Champions League knockout phase: 12–1 against Sporting CP (5–0 first leg, 7–1 second leg) in 2008–09.
- Largest margin of victory in a single match of the knockout phase in the current UEFA Champions League format: 7–0 (second leg) against Basel in 2011–12, and 7–0 (second leg) against Shakhtar Donetsk in 2014–15.
- Largest margin of victory in a quarter-final tie in the UEFA Champions League era: 6–0 (2–0 first leg, 4–0 second leg) against 1. FC Kaiserslautern in 1998–99, and 8–2 (single leg) against Barcelona in 2019–20.
- Largest margin of victory in a semi-final tie in the UEFA Champions League era: 7–0 (4–0 first leg, 3–0 second leg) against Barcelona in 2012–13.
- Largest margin of victory in a single match of semi-final in the UEFA Champions League era: 4–0 against Barcelona in 2012–13.
- Largest margin of victory in a UEFA Champions League final: 4–0 (replay) against Atlético Madrid in 1974.
- Most consecutive wins in the UEFA Champions League: 15 (18 September 2019 – 25 November 2020).
- Most consecutive home wins in the UEFA Champions League: 16 (17 September 2014 – 15 February 2017).
- Most consecutive away wins in the UEFA Champions League: 7 (19 February 2013 – 19 February 2014).
- Longest home undefeated run in the UEFA Champions League: 43 matches (17 September 1969 – 6 March 1991).
- Longest away undefeated run in the UEFA Champions League: 22 matches (31 October 2017 – 16 February 2022).
- Only team to claim any European competition with a 100% winning record (2019–20 UEFA Champions League).

=== By individual players ===
==== Appearances ====
Since 1945 (Entrance to Oberliga Süd)

- Most appearances in all competitions: Thomas Müller, 756
- Most League appearances: Sepp Maier, 537
- Most Bundesliga appearances: Thomas Müller, 503
- Most Oberliga Süd appearances: Hans Bauer, 259
- Most Regionalliga Süd appearances: Rainer Ohlhauser, 71
- Most German Cup appearances: Thomas Müller, 67
- Most intercontinental appearances: Thomas Müller, 174
- Most European Cup/UEFA Champions League appearances: Thomas Müller, 165 (includes 2 appearances in qualifying)
- Most UEFA Cup/UEFA Europa League + Inter-Cities Fairs Cup appearances: Klaus Augenthaler, 29
- Most UEFA Cup Winners' Cup appearances: Sepp Maier and Gerd Müller, 25 each
- Most UEFA Super Cup appearances: Franz Beckenbauer, Bernd Dürnberger, Udo Horsmann, Jupp Kapellmann, Sepp Maier, Karl-Heinz Rummenigge and Hans-Georg Schwarzenbeck, 4 each
- Most Intercontinental Cup appearances: Björn Andersson, Franz Beckenbauer, Uli Hoeneß, Udo Horsmann, Jupp Kapellmann, Sepp Maier, Gerd Müller, Karl-Heinz Rummenigge, Hans-Georg Schwarzenbeck and Conny Torstensson, 2 each
- Most FIFA Club World Cup appearances: Manuel Neuer, 9
- Most German Supercup appearances: Thomas Müller, 12
- Youngest first-team player: Jamal Musiala (17 years, 115 days)
- Most consecutive appearances in the Bundesliga: Sepp Maier, 442 (from 1966 to 1979)

Rank	Player	Years	League	Cup	Europe	Other	Total
1	(Germany) Thomas Müller	2008–2025	503	67	165	21	756
2	(Germany) Sepp Maier	1962–1980	537	63	86	32	709
3	(Germany) Oliver Kahn	1994–2008	429	57	130	16	632
4	(Germany) Gerd Müller	1964–1979	453	62	74	18	607
4	(Germany) Manuel Neuer	2011–present	394	47	144	22	607
6	(Germany) Franz Beckenbauer	1964–1977	427	61	71	23	582
7	(Germany) Hans-Georg Schwarzenbeck	1966–1981	416	57	70	11	554
8	(Germany) Klaus Augenthaler	1976–1991	404	50	89	2	545
9	(Germany) Philipp Lahm	2002–2017	332	54	117	14	517
10	(Germany) Joshua Kimmich	2015–present	333	45	112	18	508

==== Goalscorers ====
Since 1945 (Entrance to Oberliga Süd)

- Most goals in all competitions: Gerd Müller, 565
- Most League goals: Gerd Müller, 398
- Most Bundesliga goals: Gerd Müller, 365
- Most Oberliga Süd goals: Peter Grosser, 65
- Most Regionalliga Süd goals: Rainer Ohlhauser, 75
- Most German Cup goals: Gerd Müller, 78
- Most intercontinental goals: Robert Lewandowski, 71
- Most European Cup/UEFA Champions League goals: Robert Lewandowski, 69
- Most European Cup/UEFA Champions League goals in a season: Robert Lewandowski, 15 (during the 2019–20 season)
- Most UEFA Cup/UEFA Europa League + Inter-Cities Fairs Cup goals: Jürgen Klinsmann, 15
- Most UEFA Cup Winners' Cup goals: Gerd Müller, 20
- Most UEFA Super Cup goals: Gerd Müller, 3
- Most Intercontinental Cup goals: Jupp Kapellmann, Samuel Kuffour and Gerd Müller, 1 each
- Most FIFA Club World Cup goals: Harry Kane, Jamal Musiala and Michael Olise, 3 each
- Most German Supercup goals: Robert Lewandowski, 6
- Most goals in a season: Gerd Müller, 66 (during the 1972–73 season)
- Most Bundesliga goals in a season: Robert Lewandowski, 41 (during the 2020–21 season)
- Most Bundesliga goals in a calendar year: Robert Lewandowski, 43 (2021)
- Most times Bundesliga top scorer: Gerd Müller, 7
- Most times German Cup top scorer: Robert Lewandowski, 4

Rank	Player	Years	League	Cup	Europe	Other	Total
1	(Germany) Gerd Müller	1964–1979	398	78	65	24	565
2	(Poland) Robert Lewandowski	2014–2022	238	29	69	8	344
3	(Germany) Thomas Müller	2008–2025	150	36	57	7	250
4	(Germany) Rainer Ohlhauser	1961–1970	195	21	13	0	229
5	(Germany) Karl-Heinz Rummenigge	1974–1984	162	25	30	0	217
6	(England) Harry Kane	2023–	102	13	37	4	156
7	(Germany) Roland Wohlfarth	1984–1993	119	18	18	0	155
8	(Germany) Dieter Hoeneß	1979–1987	102	17	26	0	145
9	(Netherlands) Arjen Robben	2009–2019	99	16	26	3	144
10	(Germany) Dieter Brenninger	1962–1971	118	7	13	4	142

==== Assists ====
- Most Bundesliga assists: Thomas Müller, 178
- Most assists in a Bundesliga season: Thomas Müller, 21 (2019–20)
- Highest number of assists in the opening half of a season by a player: Thomas Müller, 13 (2021–22)

== Other club statistics ==
Fiscal year	Revenues in Mio€. ^{[I]}	Earnings in Mio€. ^{[I]}	Members^{[II]}	Fanclubs	Fanclub members
1992–93	33.3	2.5	24,285	720	?
1993–94	38.0	0.1	33,000	850	?
1994–95	63.4	4.9	44,311	1,100	?
1995–96	75.3	3.1	59,339	1,348	63,747
1996–97	84.5	7.7	71,757	1,532	78,958
1997–98	100.5	8.1	77,075	1,617	88,893
1998–99	127.7	12.3	81,957	1,761	98,728
1999–2000	144.7	8.7	84,717	1,845	107,112
2000–01	173.2	16.5	91,288	1,909	115,343
2001–02	176.0	9.8	95,195	1,980	121,348
2002–03	162.7	0.4	96,440	2,055	132,308
2003–04	166.3	−3.4	97,810	2,123	136,563
2004–05	189.5	6.6	104,720	2,189	146,009
2005–06	204.7	4.8	121,119	2,290	156,673
2006–07	225.8	18.9	135,752	2,329	164,580
2007–08	286.8	2.1	147,072	2,437	176,976
2008–09	268.7	2.5	151,227	2,535	181,688
2009–10	312.0	2.9	162,187	2,764	190,745
2010–11	290.9	1.3	171,345	2,952	204,235
2011–12	332.2	11.1	187,865	3,202	231,197
2012–13	393.9	14.0	223,985	3,576	262,077
2013–14	480.0	16.4	233,427	3,749	283,558
2014–15	485.6	15.1	251,315	3,968	306,770
2015–16	587.7	20.6	284,041	4,157	325,415
2016–17	603.0	33.2	290,000	4,209	330,557
2017–18	657.4	29.5	291,000	4,327	340,474
2018–19	750.4	52.5	293,000	4,548	364,195
2019–20	698.0	9.8			

== Notes ==
^I: The represent are the AG's earnings and revenues. ^II: The number represents the club's members.
