= History of FC Bayern Munich =

German sports club history

FC Bayern Munich is a German sports club based in Munich, Bavaria. It is best known for its professional football team, which plays in the Bundesliga, the top tier of the German football league system, and is the most successful club in German football history, having won a record 30 national titles and 20 national cups.

Founded in 1900 by eleven football players led by Franz John, the club had its period of greatest success in the middle of the 1970s when, under the captaincy of Franz Beckenbauer, they won the European Cup three consecutive seasons (1974–76). Overall, Bayern has reached eleven European Cup/UEFA Champions League finals, most recently winning their sixth title in 2020 as part of a continental treble. Bayern has also won one UEFA Cup, one European Cup Winners' Cup, one UEFA Super Cup, one FIFA Club World Cup and two Intercontinental Cups, making it one of the most successful European clubs internationally. Since the formation of the Bundesliga, Bayern has been the dominant club in German football with 29 titles and has won 10 of the last 13 titles. Bayern though being the most dominant club lost their 10 year winstreak in the 2023-2024 season to Bayer 04 Leverkusen.

== Through World War II ==
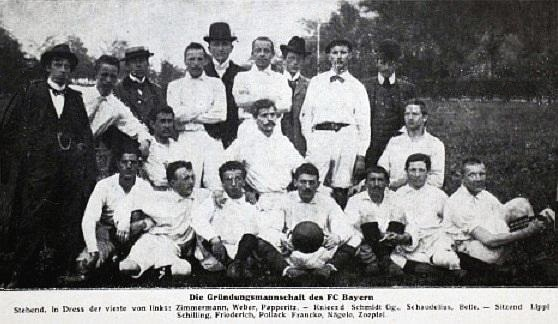
One of the first Bayern Munich squads, in 1900.

The club was formed in 1900 when a number of football enthusiasts split from Münchner TurnVerein 1879 to escape the influence of the club's gymnasts, who did not hold a great enthusiasm for the new game, an attitude typical of the times in Germany. Almost from the start, Bayern was a strong local side but failed to have much of an impact beyond that.

For financial reasons, and to take advantage of better facilities held by other clubs, they twice entered into mergers. In 1906, they negotiated a union with Münchner Sport Club. As part of the arrangement, the footballers gave up black as one of their team colours and adopted the red and white of their new partners, which they wear to this day. Bayern won their first title, as champions of the Bavarian league, in 1909 as a department of MSC. In 1919, shortly after World War I, Bayern left MSC, whose focus turned to field hockey and tennis, sports they are still active in today. Bayern then joined forces with Turn- und Sportverein 1890 Jahn München until leaving that club in 1923, and have remained independent ever since.

In those early days, Bavarian football was dominated by teams from Franconia, in the north of the state, notably 1. FC Nürnberg and their twin town neighbours SpVgg Fürth. In 1914, Fürth became the first team from the state to become national champions and by 1930 these two sides had accumulated eight titles between them. Bayern President Kurt Landauer held the office on-and-off from 1913 until 1933 and from 1947 well into the 1950s, adopted a strategic approach to building up the team and challenging this dominance. He hired William Townley as the side's first professional coach. The Englishman was the best coach on the market in Germany and had a championship with Karlsruher FV, in 1910, to his credit.

In 1926, Bayern won the South German Championship, but found themselves outdone by local rivals 1860 München who, in 1931, became the first side from the Bavarian capital to reach the national final. Inside a year, Bayern topped that by even winning the Championship in the final against Eintracht Frankfurt. The team coached by the Hungarian Richard Dombi triumphed through a penalty by Oskar "Ossi" Rohr and another goal by Franz Krumm, 2–0.

But history was against Bayern. The advent of the Hitler regime saw President Landauer, a Jew, resigning quickly, and the team visiting him in his Swiss exile did not help their fortunes in the new era. Dombi, also a Jew, moved to the Netherlands, where he picked up the reins of SC Feijenoord in Rotterdam, laying the foundations for the future greatness of the club. Although the club was widely seen as a Judenklub, president Josef Kellner (1938-43) was an NSDAP member and administrator in the Sudetenland and it had implemented an Aryan clause in 1935.

The last recorded football match played during the Third Reich was the derby between Bayern and 1860 München (3–2) on 23 April 1945. Less than three weeks later, Germany capitulated.

== Transition years 1946–1962 ==
After World War II, Bayern played in the Oberliga Süd, which was one of five upper league conferences established in the western half of the country. Through the period from the formation of the Oberligen in 1947 to the creation of the Bundesliga, Germany's professional league, in 1963, they played as a middling side. The best they could manage in their division was third- and fourth-place finishes. They even found themselves relegated to the second tier 2nd Oberliga Süd for the 1956 season – the only time this has happened.

Bayern did enjoy some measure of success outside of regular league play. They captured the 1957 German Cup, just their second national trophy, on a 78th-minute goal by Rudi Jobst against Fortuna Düsseldorf. 16 October 1962 marked the debut of the club on the European scene. In the opening round of the Inter-Cities Fairs Cup they beat Basel (3–0), but then went out in the quarter-finals against eventual finalist Dinamo Zagreb (1–4) and (0–0).

== Early successes in the Bundesliga ==
With the beginning of the 1963–64 season, the first German division—which until then had been split into five regional divisions—was unified into one national league, the Bundesliga.

The start of the new league saw disappointment for Bayern. As 1860 München had just won the last Oberliga championship—one of the few occasions they have been ahead of Bayern in that era—it was they who joined the new elite of German football. Bayern's newly elected president, Wilhelm Neudecker, the father of the modern FC Bayern, hired Zlatko "Czik" Čajkovski, a former Yugoslav World Cup player in 1950 and 1954, who had also achieved fame for coaching 1. FC Köln to the 1962 championship. This coup paid off, as he formed an aspiring team with the talented young players that should later be referred to as "the axis": goalkeeper Sepp Maier, Franz Beckenbauer and Gerd Müller. After missing out on promotion to the Bundesliga in 1964, finishing second in the league behind Hessen Kassel, Bayern won the Regionalliga Süd (II) in 1965 and gained promotion alongside future rival Borussia Mönchengladbach.

The team, with an average age of 22, immediately reached third place in the league in a year when a sparkling 1860 München won their first and only national championship title. Even more important for Bayern was the win in the Cup final against MSV Duisburg (4–2), leading them into the UEFA Cup Winners' Cup.

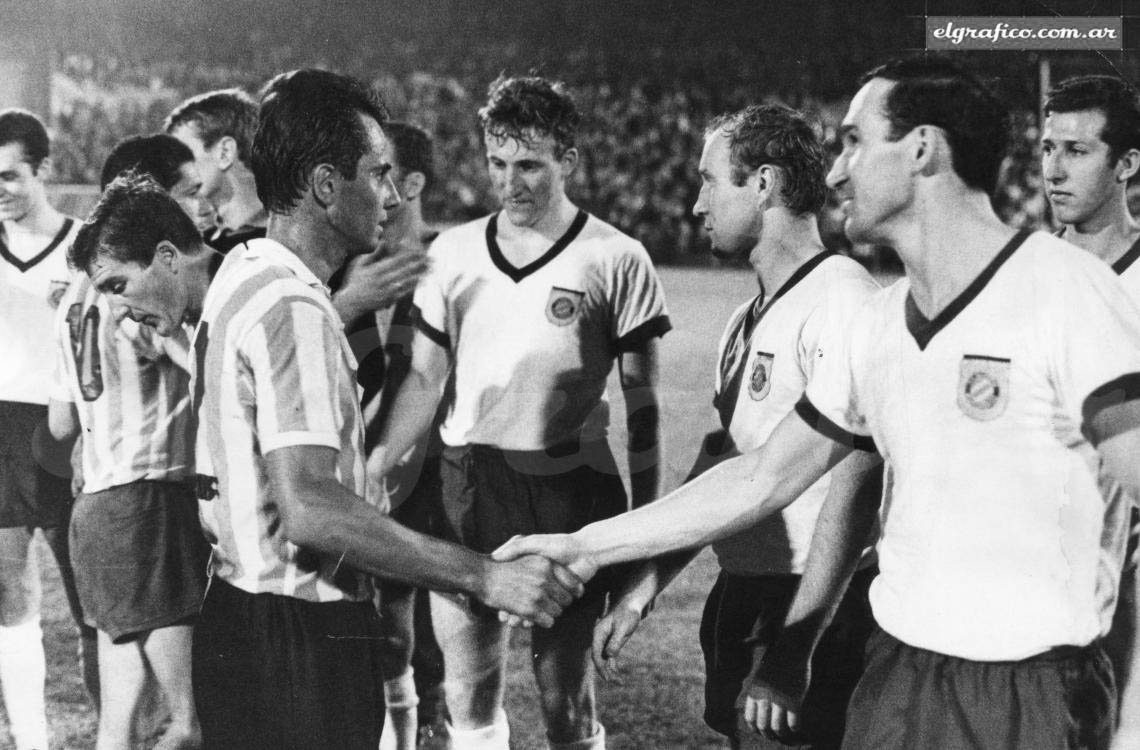
Bayern Munich (in white jersey) during a friendly match v Argentine Racing Club, December 1966

The team's star was the 20-year-old Franz Beckenbauer, who finished the season by playing at the 1966 FIFA World Cup in England, where he captured the imagination of a global audience. His efforts were rewarded with a third place in the voting for Europe's Player of the Year.

In the next season, Bayern became the third German team ever to defend the German Cup as Hamburger SV proved easy prey in the final and were defeated with a record 4–0 win. The highlight was the participation in the Cup Winners' Cup in Nuremberg, which the team won in a final 1–0 against Rangers. The goal in extra time was scored by Franz "the Bull" Roth, who would win many other cup finals for Bayern.

A slowdown of progress in the 1967–68 season saw another Yugoslav, Branko Zebec, taking over Čajkovski's job. He curbed the offensive style of the Bayern play and the discipline paid off when Bayern won the 1968–69 Championship with the Cup to boot, the first double in Bundesliga history. During the whole season, Bayern used just 13 players.

Borussia Mönchengladbach, promoted to the Bundesliga in the same year as Bayern, emerged as serious rivals to Bayern's ascendancy. They won the next two championships, and Bayern President Wilhelm Neudecker, on the recommendation of Beckenbauer, called on Udo Lattek from the coaching staff of the national team to take over the reins at Bayern. In his first year, he only managed to return the Cup to the banks of Isar river, but with young and hungry reinforcements such as Paul Breitner and Uli Hoeneß, he formed the team that achieved the first German Championship hat-trick in history.

== Golden years ==
In the last match of the 1971–72 season, Bayern sealed their return to Germany's top with a 5–1 win against Schalke 04. Schalke needed a win to get the title but only ended up the best runner-up in Bundesliga history. This was also Bayern's first official match in the new Olympic Stadium. The sell-out crowd of 80,000 assured the club the first gate in excess a 1,000,000 Marks.

Their home ground until then was the Municipal Stadion an der Grünwalder Strasse, colloquially referred to as the Grünwalder, or Sechz'ger ("Sixtier"), as it was owned before the war by 1860 München. It was a pretty run down place with a maximum capacity of around 40,000, mostly standing places. Indeed, it was so downmarket that Munich, the country's third-largest city, had not hosted a single national team match since 1940.

The Olympic Stadium in its heyday considered one of the world's most beautiful and comfortable stadiums, meaning a major boost for Bayern's revenues, not only because of its mere capacity, but also because of the much higher number of premium-priced seats. Thus, the 1972 Olympics in Munich were a major boost for the club and assured them financial superiority at least until the 1974 World Cup with its flood of new and rebuilt stadiums in the rest of the country. Successive successful seasons on the European stage helped to fill the stadium in an era when the gate revenue was still the very major source of income. Sponsorships and TV rights were a welcome but minor addition to annual budgets that were then around five million euros. Transfer fee surpluses could also contribute, but, if achieved, meant generally a loss of quality in the team.

The availability of players developed internally or acquired as youth, combined with restrictions on foreign players in the Italian and Spanish leagues, preceded the opening of a new stadium. This stadium provided the financial means for Bayern to retain players and expand the squad, as compared to Borussia Mönchengladbach, contributing to the team's standing in national and European competitions.

When Spain in 1973 re-opened its borders to foreign talent, the equivalent of a €1.5 million offer for Gerd Müller from Barcelona was fended off, and Barça had to make do with Dutchman Johan Cruyff. On the other hand, Bayern's national rivals from the Rhine, Mönchengladbach, relinquished superstar Günter Netzer to Real Madrid. Soon thereafter, Bayern could also hire the services of Jupp Kapellmann from 1. FC Köln for the then-national record transfer fee of almost €400,000.

In the year 1972 Bayern won the record breaking league title and emerged as a top European club. Six players from Bayern were part of the West Germany national team that won the European Championship. They defended their title the following year by finishing well ahead of their rivals and became the top German football club.

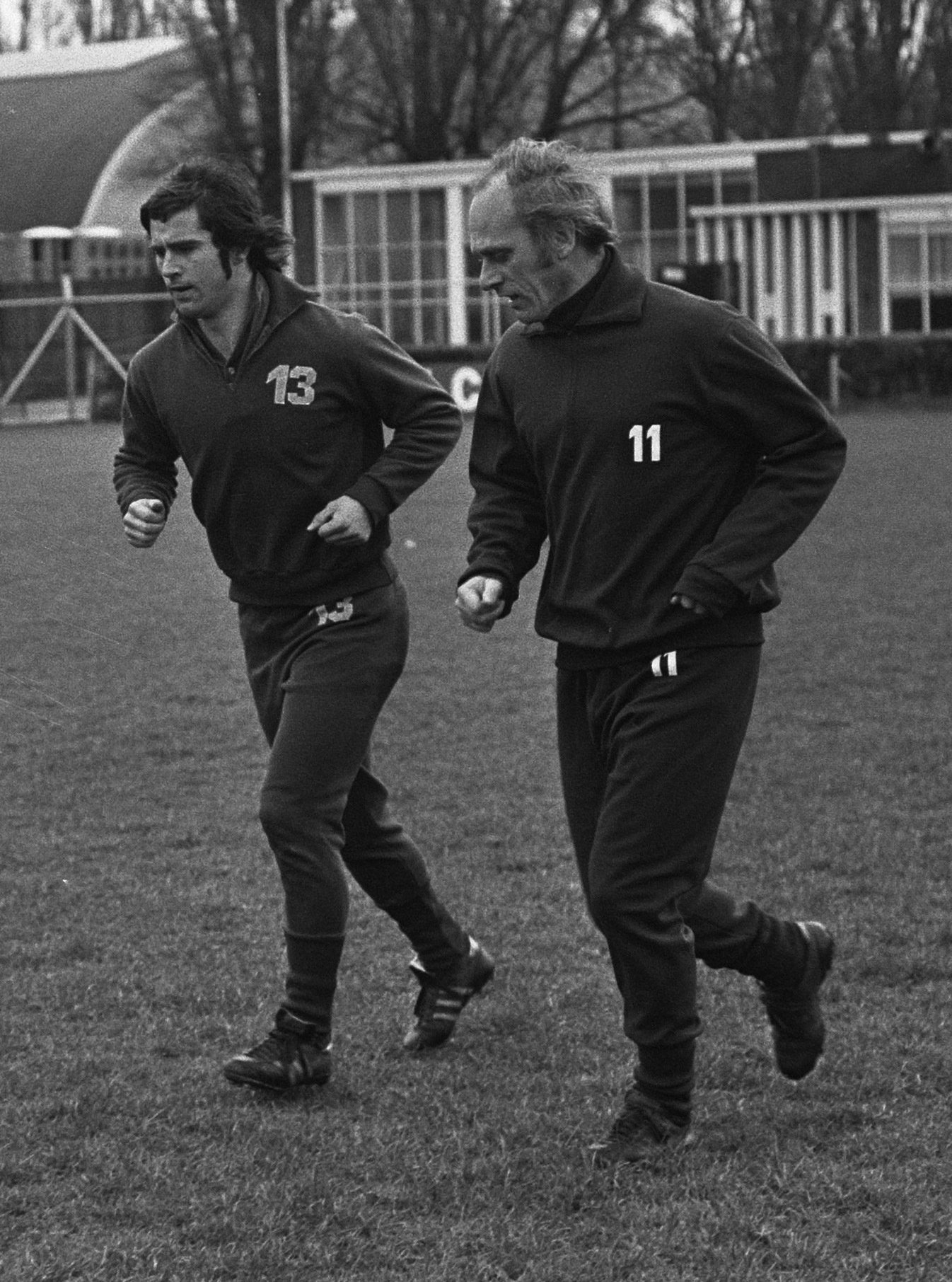
Gerd Müller and Udo Lattek in 1973

The third championship in 1974 coincided with Bayern also becoming the first German team to win the European Cup. In the last minute of extra time in the Heysel Stadium, full back Georg Schwarzenbeck surprised everyone when he scored an equaliser against Atlético Madrid from 35 metres. The first-ever replay of a European Cup final two days later saw two goals each from Uli Hoeneß and Gerd Müller, comfortably winning Bayern the Cup.

Six Bayern players were also part of the West German side that won the World Cup final of the same year against the Netherlands. In the following season, the team's motivation on the national level was exhausted, but under coach Dettmar Cramer, they still managed to score the big points. In 1975 Leeds United were defeated in the Champions Cup final in Paris when Franz Roth and Gerd Müller secured the defence of the Cup with their late goals. Bayern then also established a new record of sorts: the only Champions Cup winner to date with a negative national league record in the same season. Within 12 months, in Glasgow, Saint-Étienne were beaten by another goal by Roth and Bayern became the third team to win the trophy in three consecutive years.

The Intercontinental Cup finals in December 1976 marked the end of the team's golden era. Bayern prevailed once more. In a frosty Olympiastadion, Brazilian club Cruzeiro fell prey to goals by Jupp Kapellmann and Gerd Müller. A monumental defensive effort front of 117,000 fans held Cruzeiro to a 0–0 draw on their home turf. Within the next couple of years, Beckenbauer and Müller left for the United States and Sepp Maier's career was ended by a car accident – after he had been ever-present for 13 seasons in the starting eleven of the team, then a world record. Bayern were in need of a new beginning.

== Renewed success in the 1980s ==
A lack of success saw President Neudecker on the verge of contracting Max Merkel as new coach – the team voted against him. This revolution saw Bayern dominating the television news in a culture where sports were an irregular addendum to them. The resulting resignation of the president Neudecker, was again the top news item, even on theTagesschau news in an era without commercial television.

Hungarian Pál Csernai, who had been assistant to Cramer's replacement, Gyula Lóránt, became head coach. In his tenure, he revolutionised the style of Bayern by introducing the spatial defence, then in Munich referred to as Pal System. When Paul Breitner returned via Braunschweig from his years with Real Madrid, he formed a partnership with Karl-Heinz Rummenigge. The FC Breitnigge, reinforced with Belgian goalkeeping legend Jean-Marie Pfaff, Klaus Augenthaler and striker Dieter Hoeneß (brother of Uli), brought success back to Munich. Two championships and a cup resulted from this era. Their dreams of another European Cup were thwarted in the final of Rotterdam against Aston Villa, when for a brief moment a man named Peter Withe stepped out of obscurity and scored the decider for the team from Birmingham. This was also the first official final that Bayern had lost in its history after 12 undefeated final appearances.

The era of Csernai came to an end when success no longer seemed assured and his eccentricity endangered the image of the club with their major sponsors. Udo Lattek was appointed for a second spell at the Isar, and he did not disappoint, despite initial financial issues. For hiring Danish playmaker Søren Lerby from Ajax to replace the retiring Breitner, Bayern had pledged "the last money", per President Willi Otto Hoffmann.

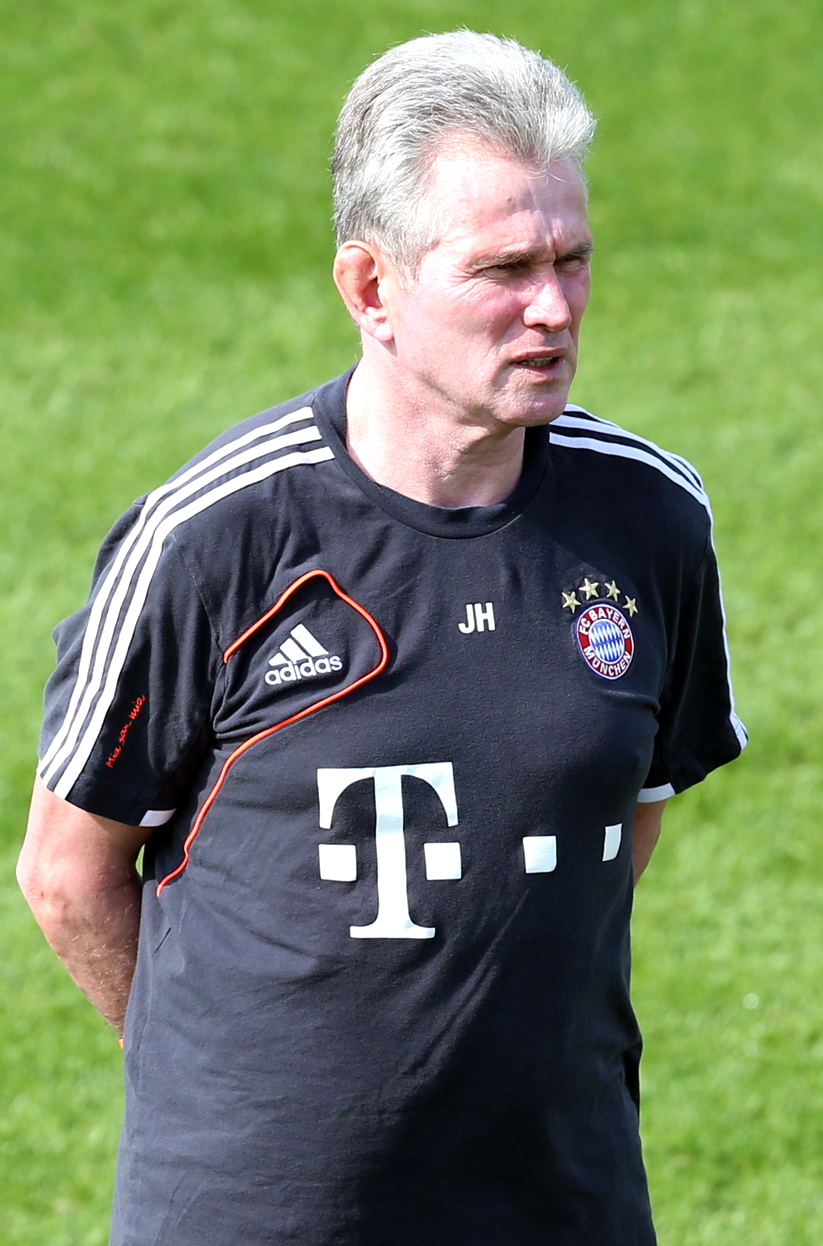
Jupp Heynckes (pictured here in 2013) coached Bayern Munich to two Bundesliga titles in 1988 and 1989

The cup victory in the 1984 final against Mönchengladbach was won in the penalty shootout, the first in the history of this competition. The young Lothar Matthäus, whose transfer to Munich for €1.2 million was announced just weeks before, missed the first penalty for his old team.

After Rummenigge's transfer to Internazionale for a then-world record transfer fee of more than €5 million restored the club's finances, but team had now lost its superstars. Nonetheless, however, the reformed squad secured one more cup, as part of a double, and five championships inside six years, including the second hat-trick, leading to the tenth title allowing the club to finally overtake 1. FC Nürnberg as record holders. But it became another generation to be denied continental glory when, in the 1987 European Cup Final in Vienna, Porto prevailed 2–1 through two goals by Rabah Madjer and Juary in the last 13 minutes, with a 25th-minute header from Ludwig Kögl failing to close the game for Bayern.

Udo Lattek decided to retire afterwards and Bayern, keen on refilling their coffers, let go of quite a few players.

New coach Jupp Heynckes, already at his former post in Mönchengladbach successor of Lattek, started with a title-free season, after which Matthäus and Andreas Brehme went to Internazionale from where a generous reimbursement was received. Also Pfaff and three more players left. As Olaf Thon and Stefan Reuter were the most prominent newcomers, hopes were not high, but in the next couple of years two more championships were won. Augenthaler's retirement and the sale of Jürgen Kohler and Stefan Reuter to Juventus badly depleted the squad. Two seasons without any trophies followed, and cost Heynckes his job.

Søren Lerby rejoined the club as manager, unfortunately his tenure proved to be an absolute disaster as weak signings and ineffective tactics left Bayern facing an unthinkable relegation by the time Lerby was sacked in early 1992. Making matters worse, B 1903 Copenhagen ousted Bayern from the UEFA Cup with ease with 6–2 / 0–1. Erich Ribbeck took over as coach, working with Franz Beckenbauer as director of sport, and managed to steer the club to safety.

The club was not keen on repeating the disaster of 1991–92, and in the next season Bayern spent the equivalent of €12 million on the new players—Thomas Helmer (€4M), Brazil's captain Jorginho (€2.8M) and Lothar Matthäus (€2M) topped the bill of a list that also included Mehmet Scholl. Calming the nerves of the thrifty President Dr. Fritz Scherer, an economics professor at LMU Munich, was the sale of Stefan Effenberg and Brian Laudrup for €8.5 million to Fiorentina. The rebuilt side came close to winning the title, but just missed out. Ribbeck's tactics, which were felt to be overly negative, were blamed for this, and when the following season looked to be going no differently, Beckenbauer dismissed Ribbeck and took control of the team himself. An immediate upturn in form saw Bayern take that year's title.

"Kaiser Franz's" status as a club legend was reinforced, and a few years later he became president, with Giovanni Trapattoni being hired as the first Italian coach in the Bundesliga. Trapattoni gained the respect of German pundits, but problems (supposedly caused by Trapattoni having a poor grasp of German) saw the team in disarray. After a sixth-place finish, Trapattoni returned to Italy, whereupon Otto Rehhagel was appointed manager with the hope that he could bring the success he had earned with Werder Bremen to a team that was by then often referred to as "FC Hollywood". As the team continued to have more impact on the social pages of the tabloids rather than on the pitch, "King Otto's" tenure was cut short due to disagreements with the board, and Beckenbauer steered the club to victory in the 1996 UEFA Cup Final against Bordeaux. Zinedine Zidane, Christophe Dugarry and Bixente Lizarazu were outclassed 2–0 and even 3–1 away. Jürgen Klinsmann scored a record-breaking 15 goals in Bayern's European campaign that led the team to its first continental trophy in 20 years after eliminating, amongst others, the likes of Benfica, Nottingham Forest and Barcelona.

In the off-season, Giovanni Trapattoni returned to the team as coach, now with a fluent grasp of German, and rewarded the renewed trust with an immediate championship, followed by league runner-up finish and a cup win the next season, after which he once more returned to Italy.

== Beginning of the new millennium ==
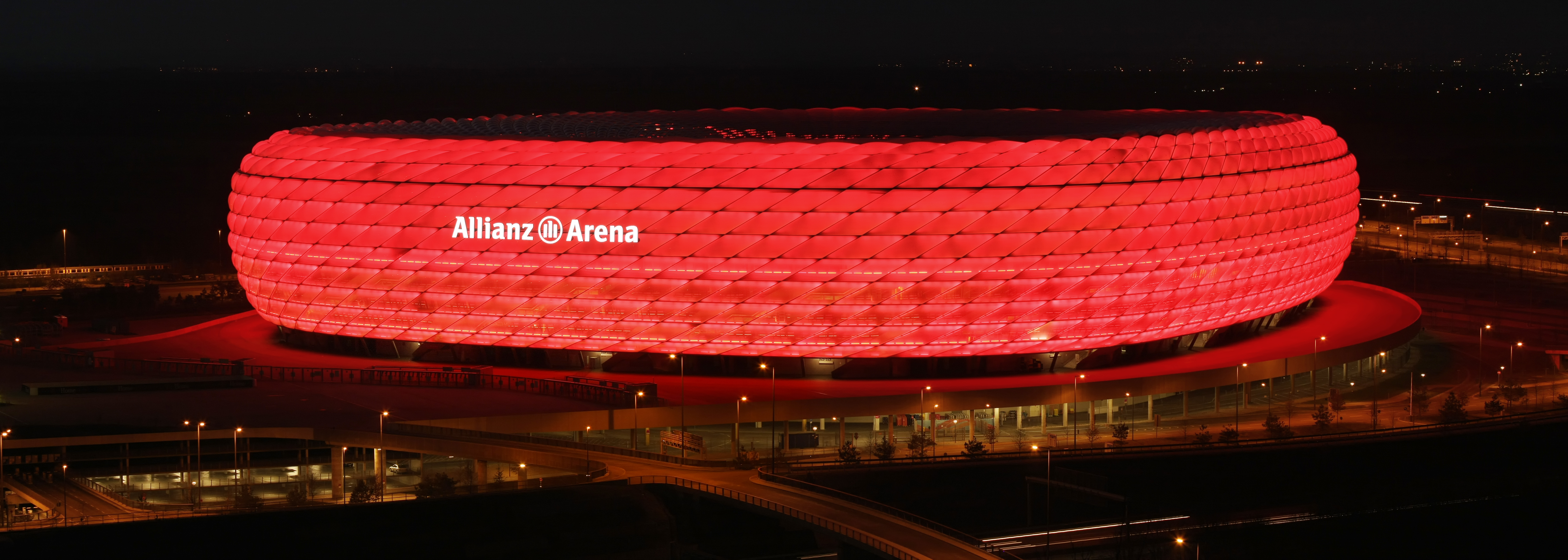
Opened in 2005, the Allianz Arena is one of the world's most modern football stadiums.

The following six years marked a highly successful period for Bayern. During this time, Ottmar Hitzfeld succeeded Udo Lattek as the most successful German coach and established himself amongst the greatest European coaches of his era.

In his first season in 1999, Bayern won the league title, but undeniably the highlight was the unforgettable Champions League Final in Barcelona. Bayern led early after a Mario Basler free-kick and controlled most of the match, but Manchester United sensationally turned the match around in stoppage time. Inside 90 seconds, Teddy Sheringham and Ole Gunnar Solskjær transformed an excellent performance from Bayern into the sight of uninhibited tears by Samuel Kuffour and company. Adding insult to injury, Bayern lost in a penalty shootout in the national cup final against Werder Bremen two weeks later. For Lothar Matthäus, it was the second time that he missed a decisive penalty in a cup final.

The next season saw Bayern taking their revenge over Bremen with a 3–0 victory in a repeat of this cup final and thus Bayern achieving its third double. In Europe, the campaign of the team now dominated by goalkeeper Oliver Kahn, midfield engine Stefan Effenberg and striker Giovane Élber ended in the semi-final encounters with later winners Real Madrid (0–2, 2–1).

In 2001, after a quarter of a century of absence, the European Cup eventually returned to Munich. Bayern exacted revenge against 1999 winners Manchester United in the quarter-finals with two wins (1–0, 2–1). The semifinal again witnessed a revenge fixture, this time Real Madrid were the opponents: Bayern won both matches against the Castilians (1–0, 2–1). At the final in Milan, Valencia from Spain came off second-best, like in the previous year. In a hardly memorable match all goals were achieved by spot kicks. In the end, Bayern prevailed deservedly in the penalty shootout (1–1; 5–4 in penalties). The backbone of this team was Oliver Kahn, who held three penalties and whose mental fortitude was also crucial for winning the national championship just a few days earlier. In the heartbreak finish of the Bundesliga, Bayern stayed ahead of Schalke 04 through Swedish defender Patrik Andersson's goal against Hamburger SV in literally the last second of the season, assuring the club a third consecutive title. For runners-up Schalke, their four-and-a-half minutes of championship celebrations proved premature.

In the next season, the team was not able to win a record fourth consecutive Bundesliga title, nor the cup. In the Champions League quarter-final, eventual winners Real Madrid prevailed with 3–2 aggregate win (2–1, 0–2). The saving grace was the win of the Intercontinental Cup in Tokyo against Boca Juniors through a Sammy Kuffour goal in extra time.

National glory returned in 2002–03 when Bayern achieved its fourth double by winning the Bundesliga with the second largest gap ever to the runner-up and a straight 3–1 win over 1. FC Kaiserslautern in the cup final. However, the whole season was overshadowed by Bayern's unceremonious exit from the Champions League in the first group stage, without so much as a single win in six matches. The following season, the team, enhanced with the €19 million acquisition of Dutch striker Roy Makaay from Deportivo de La Coruña, overcame at least this hurdle, but even an underperforming Real Madrid in crisis managed to eliminate the Reds in the round of 16. Bayern itself was not reaching any consistent form all year and even the formerly sturdy defence proved highly vulnerable. In the end, the club's second-placed finish in the league was not descriptive of Bayern's strength but rather of inconsistent performances by its competitors. The cup elimination by second division Alemannia Aachen was symptomatic for a season in which the team showed not a single convincing performance. Even the newcomers Michael Ballack and 2002 World Cup-winning defender Lúcio could not make a difference.

Following the season, it was decided that Hitzfeld should leave the club and Felix Magath, a former player for Hamburger SV during the late 1970s to mid-1980s which was so highly competitive with Bayern and also successful in Europe, was given the chance to put his mark on a new Bayern generation. In his first year in charge he steered the club to a double.

Beginning with the 2005–06 season, Bayern moved from the Olympic Stadium to the new Allianz Arena, which the club owns jointly with local rivals 1860 München. Since the move, Bayern has won most of their matches there, and the stadium was well received by the fans, with almost all home matches in front of sell-out crowds. It was again the national double that could be celebrated in the new ground at the end of the season; however, the club's performance on international level proved once more to be rather dismal: a crushing 1–4 defeat by Milan in the last 16 of the 2005–06 Champions League put a quick end to their campaign. The Championship Plate and the Cup were also farewell presents for Bixente Lizarazu and Jens Jeremies, two players who ended their career after many successful years for the club. The loss of influential player Michael Ballack to Chelsea on a free transfer greatly upset Karl-Heinz Rummenigge, who has moaned about Chelsea's spending power being "not acceptable or fair".

For the 2006–07 season, Bayern thinned out their squad, with Ballack and Zé Roberto departing (the Brazilian did not get along well with Magath), Paolo Guerrero being sold to rivals Hamburger SV and Lizarazu and Jeremies ending their careers. Joining the club was German international Lukas Podolski after months of speculation concerning his future after the relegation of his former club 1. FC Köln, while to strengthen its defence, Bayern recruited centre-back Daniel Van Buyten from Hamburg. Due to the club's early exits in the previous years, expectations on international level were toned down by the club's officials, also reflecting their reluctance to spend extremely high sums on "superstar" players, despite the widespread opinion among observers that a new high-profile playmaker was needed to replace Ballack. However, when Dutch striker Ruud van Nistelrooy's ambitions to leave Manchester United became public, Uli Hoeneß expressed the intention to sign him, though he ultimately fell short after Van Nistelrooy chose to join Real Madrid instead. The final day of the 2006 summer transfer window would see Bayern acquire Dutch midfielder Mark van Bommel, who had fallen out of favour at Barcelona. Those calling for a real "number 10" were disappointed with this move, as Van Bommel is a defensive midfield "worker" rather than a creative playmaker. Nonetheless, however, Van Bommel's leadership qualities and uncompromising style of play would prove important for the team, eventually securing him the captain's armband after Oliver Kahn's retirement in 2008.

After an unconvincing first half of the season, Magath was sacked in January 2007 over fears of not qualifying for the following season's Champions League. He was replaced by Ottmar Hitzfeld, returning for his second spell in charge. He was, despite his best efforts, not able to turn the season around and lead Bayern to the 2007–08 Champions League campaign, which instead "relegated" the club to the 2007–08 UEFA Cup, in which they had last played in the 1995–96 season. A 0–2 home defeat against Milan in the Champions League and a devastating 2–0 away defeat at eventual Bundesliga champions VfB Stuttgart in particular prompted club officials to re-evaluate the team that ultimately finished fourth in the Bundesliga; it was already stated well within the 2006–07 season that the following year's team would be drastically different.

Months before season's end, Bayern began courting Werder Bremen star striker Miroslav Klose without first talking to the club, greatly upsetting Bremen officials, who stated that they fully expected Klose to honor his contract that ran until 2008. Uli Hoeneß replied that if Bremen insisted on Klose playing another season with them, the transfer would definitely take place one year later. It was probably when it became apparent that Klose would be "the player that will join Bayern" for over a year if he stayed that Bremen eventually agreed on the transfer for a purported sum of approximately €12 million.
Apart from Klose, the two most prominent signings for the 2007–08 season were Italian World Cup winner Luca Toni and French midfielder Franck Ribéry, with the latter alone costing Bayern a club record fee of €25 million. Other prominent players to join the "new" Bayern for the upcoming season were German internationals Marcell Jansen and Jan Schlaudraff. These five were completed by Argentinian youth international José Sosa, Turkish international Hamit Altıntop (from Schalke 04) and the returning Zé Roberto for his second spell with the Reds after one year spent with Santos in Brazil.
The other side of renewing the team was a number of notable players leaving the club: Owen Hargreaves was signed by Manchester United after Bayern had refused the transfer a year earlier, while strikers Claudio Pizarro and Roque Santa Cruz likewise both left for English clubs, Chelsea and Blackburn Rovers respectively (Santa Cruz quickly rose to prominence at Blackburn, scoring 19 goals in his first Premier League season after just 31 Bundesliga goals in eight years at Bayern). Meanwhile, Roy Makaay moved to Feyenoord, seeing his starting team chances dwindle with the signings of fellow strikers Toni and Klose, while Ali Karimi left the club after two seasons and Andreas Görlitz being loaned out Karlsruher SC. Hasan Salihamidžić and Mehmet Scholl also left the club after many years with Bayern; Salihamidžić signed for Juventus while Scholl ended his career at the age of 36, playing in the last match of the season and scoring his last goal. He would be given a farewell match before the start of the new season when Bayern played against Barcelona for the Franz Beckenbauer Cup.

The retooling effort made would immediately prove fruitful in a successful Bundesliga campaign that saw Bayern dominate the league and occupying the top spot of the table for the entirety of the season, being defeated just twice in 34 matches and setting a new Bundesliga record for fewest goals conceded, with 21. They also completed another double as they defeated Borussia Dortmund in the cup final.
Pre-season top transfers Ribéry and Toni would also prove to be league's most influential players. Ribéry was usually named the league's most technically gifted player and often seemed virtually unstoppable by the opposing defense lines; he scored 11 goals and creating eight assists, being voted Germany's Footballer of the Year at the end of his first season. Meanwhile, Toni became the league's top scorer with 24 goals, scoring a total of 39 in 46 official matches. His popularity was further increased by achieving feats such as a four-goal haul during Bayern's 6–0 UEFA Cup win against Greek club Aris, a "perfect" hat-trick in a Bundesliga match against Hannover 96 and four braces within ten days in a UEFA Cup match, two Bundesliga games and the domestic cup final. His strike partner Klose, however, had a disappointing season overall, starting very strong with eight goals in his first six matches, then only netting two more for the rest of the season.

Bayern's "unwanted" (as the club aspires to play in the Champions League exclusively) UEFA Cup campaign saw mixed performances against teams clearly perceived as weaker, such as against Bolton Wanderers, Belenenses or Getafe, but they managed to reach the semi-finals where they were eliminated in a humiliating 0–4 away defeat to Russian champions and eventual Cup winners Zenit Saint Petersburg.

The 2008–09 season saw former Bayern star and Germany national coach Jürgen Klinsmann taking charge as the team's new coach, with long-term goalkeeper and captain Oliver Kahn ending his career. The team performed inconsistently in the domestic league while initially achieving strong results in its Champions League campaign: most notably, Bayern advanced to the quarter-finals after a record joint leg 12–1 victory over Sporting CP. However, the next round saw Bayern's exit after a humiliating 0–4 defeat against eventual champions Barcelona. On the heels of a crucial Bundesliga loss against rival title contenders VfL Wolfsburg and in danger of missing a Champions League spot for the next season, Klinsmann was sacked and replaced with veteran coach Jupp Heynckes, who was brought back from retirement for the last remaining matches. Heynckes managed to win a string of games and eventually secured the second place for Bayern, but had no plans to stay at the club.

Prior to the 2009–10 season, Bayern made major changes to both the squad and the management, hiring Dutch coach Louis van Gaal and strikers Arjen Robben and Mario Gómez, with the latter purchase setting a new club record transfer fee at €30 million. Shortly before the end of the year, long-term manager Uli Hoeneß retired from his position and assumed the club's presidency. After a rocky start into the new season, the team began to pick up steam in late fall, defeating Juventus 4–1 in a make-or-break Champions League group stage match and steadily ascending in the Bundesliga. Led by a brilliant Robben, who scored a string of crucial goals in all competitions, Bayern was eventually able to secure both domestic titles and advanced to the Champions League final in Madrid. While they were ultimately unable to overcome Internazionale, finishing as runners-up still meant that the 2009–10 season was Bayern's most successful in almost a decade.

After the team's highly successful run the previous year, Bayern management deferred to Van Gaal's assessment that no further transfers were needed in the run-up to the 2010–11 season. However, some players who had already been transferred away on a loan basis the year before, such as Luca Toni and José Sosa, were sold outright. Returning loanee Toni Kroos, who had also spent the last one-and-a-half years at Bayer Leverkusen, was the only notable "addition" to the squad. Bayern again had to deal with a string of injuries that befell key players, most notably Robben, who missed the whole first leg of the season due to a harmstring injury that he had picked up when preparing for the 2010 World Cup with the Netherlands. The team got off to a very poor start in the league, only securing eight points out of its first seven Bundesliga games and quickly conceding a substantial lead to eventual champions Borussia Dortmund. Hampered by consistently weak showings in its defence, Bayern finished the first half of the season in fifth place, 14 points behind leaders Dortmund. The winter transfer period saw the addition of Luiz Gustavo from 1899 Hoffenheim against the departures of captain Mark van Bommel to Milan and central defender Martín Demichelis to Málaga. While Bayern performed much better during the season's second half, securing the most league points of all teams, Dortmund's lead would eventually prove insurmountable. At the European level, Bayern looked poised to exact revenge on Internazionale for their Champions League final loss the year before, but despite a 1–0 away victory, the team exited the competition after a 2–3 home loss. Having already agreed to terminate his contract at the end of the season, Van Gaal was ultimately sacked outright on 10 April. Former assistant coach Andries Jonker took over the team and managed to win third place in the league, achieving the minimum aim of reaching a Champions League qualification spot.

In the 2011–12 Champions League campaign, the team reached the final after eliminating Real Madrid in a penalty shoot-out at the Santiago Bernabéu Stadium, but lost out eventually on another penalty shoot-out to hand Chelsea their first European triumph.

== Treble of 2012–13 ==
In the 2012–13 season, Bayern reached their third European final in four successive campaigns, memorably routing favourites and Spanish domestic champions Barcelona 7–0 over two legs. On 25 May 2013, riding on a late winner from Arjen Robben, they defeated compatriots Borussia Dortmund 2–1 at Wembley Stadium to clinch their fifth European Cup title, and their first in 12 years. One week later, on 1 June 2013, Jupp Heynckes in his final match delivered a 3–2 victory over VfB Stuttgart in the German Cup final to secure a historic treble, having also wrapped up the Bundesliga eight weeks earlier.

== Pep Guardiola era ==
Following Bayern Munich's historic treble, the club hired Pep Guardiola – who himself had coached FC Barcelona to a treble of their own four years prior – as their manager on a three-year deal. Guardiola's first game as Bayern manager was a disappointing DFL Supercup loss to Borussia Dortmund. Bayern won the UEFA Supercup and FIFA Club World Cup in Guardiola's first season, in addition to a Bundesliga triumph as early as March, a record in German football. Despite winning the Bundesliga with a joint-record 29 wins, Bayern were eliminated in the semi-finals of the Champions League 5–0 on aggregate at the hands of Real Madrid, notably losing at home 0–4. Despite this enormous setback, Bayern Munich bounced back with a DFB Pokal win that sealed their second consecutive domestic double.

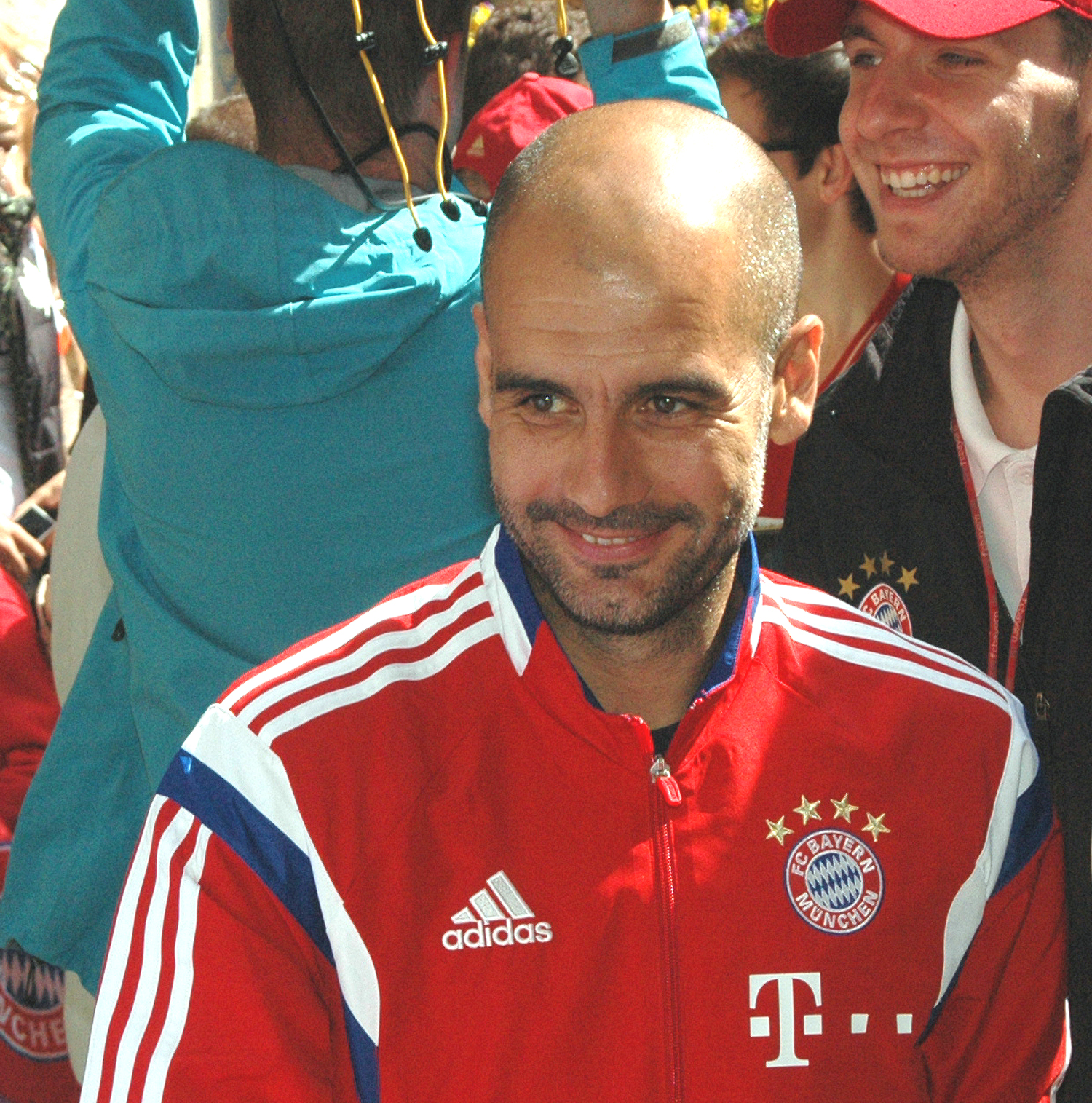
Pep Guardiola in 2014

For the 2014/15 season, Bayern Munich reinforced its team with the signing of Dortmund striker Robert Lewandowski. They lost the DFL Supercup to Dortmund and failed to retain its DFB Pokal title. They also bowed out of the Champions League semi final stage again, losing 5–3 on aggregate to Barcelona. They did however clinch their third consecutive Bundesliga title.

In Pep Guardiola's final season in charge, Bayern Munich clinched its fourth consecutive Bundesliga title while conceding least goals in a single Bundesliga campaign (17), but failed once again to win the Champions League, losing to Atletico Madrid on away goals in the semi-finals. Consolation arrived in the form of a DFB Pokal triumph over arch-rivals Borussia Dortmund. Guardiola subsequently departed and later joined Manchester City.

== Continued domestic dominance ==
Bayern Munich appointed Carlo Ancelotti to replace Guardiola for the 2016–17 season. His first game in charge was a 2–0 win over Borussia Dortmund in the 2016 DFL Supercup. Bayern Munich sealed a fifth straight league title that season courtesy of a 6–0 thrashing of VfL Wolfsburg away from home. Ancelotti led Bayern to the quarter-finals of the Champions League following a 10–2 aggregate victory over Arsenal, but Bayern were ultimately eliminated by eventually winners Real Madrid 6–3 on aggregate. Bayern also failed to win the DFB Pokal, being eliminated from the competition by Dortmund.

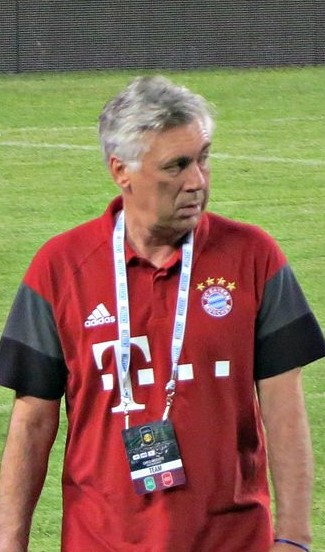
Carlo Ancelotti (pictured here) coached Bayern Munich to a fifth straight Bundesliga title

In the 2017/18 season – which was the team's first since 2004–05 without captain Philip Lahm – Ancelotti led Bayern to another DFL Supercup title by defeating Borussia Dortmund again. However, following a 3–0 defeat to Paris Saint Germain in the Champions League group stage, and after a poor start to the Bundesliga, Ancelotti was sacked by Bayern in September 2017. Willy Sagnol became caretaker manager for a single match before Bayern appointed Jupp Heynckes again, in what was to be his fourth stint at the club. Success immediately followed the appointment as Bayern won the league by 21 points and returned to the semi-finals of the Champions League. However, Bayern were again eliminated by Real Madrid, this time by a single goal in 4–3 aggregate loss. Heynckes retired after the end of the season, despite the club repeatedly asking him to stay on for the following 2018–19 season.

Bayern Munich appointed Niko Kovač – who had guided Eintracht Frankfurt to a 3–1 victory over Bayern themselves in the final match for Jupp Heynckes – as manager to replace Heynckes. Bayern got off to a rocky start in the Bundesliga, losing 0–3 at Allianz Arena to Borussia Mönchengladbach, but a good run of games was sufficient to hand them a seventh straight Bundesliga title after a 5–1 win over Kovac’s former employer Frankfurt in the final match of the season. Success evaded them in the Champions League as they were eliminated by Liverpool after a 1–3 home loss. Bayern sealed the domestic double that season with a triumph in the DFB Pokal final.

== The Sextuple ==
Despite defeating Tottenham Hotspur 2–7 in the Champions League, Bayern suffered a slow start to the 2019–20 season, culminating in a 5–1 thrashing at the hands Kovac's former side Eintracht Frankfurt. Kovac was dismissed following the defeat to Frankfurt, and was replaced by assistant coach Hansi Flick. Flick's tenure got off to a bright start with three wins in three games, including a commanding 4–0 win over Borussia Dortmund. Although the team suffered two straight defeats afterwards, they then went on an unbeaten streak that stretched into the new year, winning all but one game, until the COVID-19 pandemic stopped football altogether. The Bundesliga season resumed in May 2020, and Bayern won all of their remaining domestic games to successfully defend the double.

The Champions League resumed in August, and was changed to a single-legged mini tournament in Lisbon due to the pandemic. Bayern made history by defeating Barcelona 8–2 in the quarterfinals, before beating Lyon and Paris Saint-Germain in the next two games to win their sixth European Cup and complete their second continental treble.

Bayern then went on to win both the domestic and European Super Cups and the Club World Cup to complete the sextuple, becoming only the second team in history to do so after Pep Guardiola's Barcelona in 2009.

== 11 straight league titles ==
The 20-21 season produced a shock when Bayern were knocked out of the DFB-Pokal by second-division Holstein Kiel. However, that remained only a blip as the team won yet another Bundesliga title, their ninth in as many years. Hansi Flick left Bayern after the season ended to coach the Germany national team. Julian Nagelsmann was appointed in his place.

Nagelsmann's Bayern picked up their first win and their first trophy by defeating Borussia Dortmund in the DFL-Supercup. Although Bayern were unsuccessful yet again in the Pokal, losing 0–5 to Borussia Mönchengladbach, and were ignominiously knocked out from the Champions League by underdogs Villarreal, they made history by winning their tenth consecutive Bundesliga title. By doing so, they became the first ever team in Europe's top five leagues to win the domestic league ten consecutive years.

Bayern reached its eleventh Bundesliga, after Borussia Dortmund tied its last matchday against Mainz 05, and Bayern emerged champion on goal difference, winning 2–1 against Köln.

== Trophyless in season 2023–24 ==
In the 2023–24 season, Bayern would not win any titles, starting with the DFL-Supercup, which they would lose 0–3 against RB Leipzig. In the DFB-Pokal they would only be eliminated in the second round against Saarbrücken, a third division team that would come back 2–1 in the final minutes. In the Champions League they would be the leader of group A, eliminating Lazio in the round of 16 by 3–1, Arsenal in the quarter-finals by 3–2 on aggregate, but would be eliminated by Real Madrid 4–3 in the semifinals in aggregate after a dramatic second leg, where Bayern led 1-0 til the 88th minute, before Joselu scored a brace to send Real into the final. Finally, in the Bundesliga they would lose 8 games, which would move them further and further away from first place, Bayer Leverkusen, who would also win the Bundesliga undefeated. Bayern finished third, below VfB Stuttgart and Leverkusen, something that had not happened since the 2010–11 season.

As a result of the trophyless season, head coach Thomas Tuchel was fired, replaced in his place by Vincent Kompany for the 2024–25 season.
