= Judenklub =

Derogatory, antisemitic term used throughout the Nazi era in Germany and Austria

Judenklub (English: Jew club) is a derogatory, antisemitic term used throughout the Nazi era in Germany and Austria, applied to association football clubs with strong Jewish heritage and connections. Some of the most prominent clubs referred to in such a way by the Nazis were FC Bayern München (Munich), FK Austria Wien, Eintracht Frankfurt and FSV Frankfurt.

In more recent times the term has occasionally also been used in academic literature as well as in the German-language press when reporting on antisemitic chants and attacks by rival fan groups on non-German clubs like Tottenham Hotspur, AFC Ajax, RSC Anderlecht, SK Slavia Prague, MTK Budapest FC and KS Cracovia who have a Jewish heritage or connection.

== FC Bayern München (Munich) ==
FC Bayern München (Munich), founded in the bohemian Munich suburb of Schwabing, had a Jewish leadership before the Nazis rise to power and won their first German championship in 1932 under the direction of a Jewish president and coach. In 1933 president Kurt Landauer, director of the youth department Otto Beer and coach Richard Dombi had to leave the club because of their Jewish background and the club consequently declined, losing a large number of its members. Bayern, far less popular with the Nazis than local rival TSV 1860 München (Munich), had very limited success in the Gauliga Bayern during this era but continued small acts of defiance like the team acknowledging former president Landauer while on a friendly in Switzerland in 1943, where the latter had emigrated to.

For many decades after the end of the Second World War the Jewish past and the events of the Nazi era received little attention from the side of the club until 2011 when the book Der FC Bayern und seine Juden (FC Bayern and their Jews) was published and renewed interest. Until then the club, for various reasons, had been reluctant to address its own history during the Nazi era.

== FK Austria Wien ==
FK Austria Wien, based in Vienna, had, from its formation, been led and influenced by Jewish citizens. The club experienced little antisemitic behaviour until the Anschluss of Austria into Nazi Germany in March 1938 but this radically changed from then on. After the Anschluss Austria was forced to change its name for a time to SC Ostmark, having to evict all its Jewish members and experiencing only limited amount of success in the Gauliga Ostmark during the time. Austria Wien's Jewish president, Michl Schwarz, escaped Nazi Germany like Bayern Munich's Kurt Landauer but had a much more difficult time evading arrest and, like Landauer, led his club once more after the Second World War.

== See also ==
- Antisemitism in the Olympic Games
- Jewish Olympics
- Muscular Judaism
- Superjews, a nickname of the Dutch soccer club AFC Ajax
- Yids, a nickname for the English soccer club Tottenham Hotspur F.C.
- Club Atlético Atlanta, historic club from Buenos Aires associated with the local Jewish community
- List of ethnic sports team and mascot names
