= Superjews =

- Directed by: Nirit Peled
- Written by: Nirit Peled & Simon van Melick
- Produced by: Tamara Vuurhuis & Valérie Schuit
- Edited by: Paul Delput
- Music by: Amit Gur
- Distributed by: NTR / Viewpoint Productions
- Release date: November 24, 2013 (IDFA)
- Running time: 66 minutes
- Country: Netherlands
- Languages: Dutch; Hebrew

Superjews (Dutch: Superjews: De Superjoden van Ajax) is a 2013 documentary film in Dutch and Hebrew languages that was produced and directed by Israeli-Dutch filmmaker Nirit Peled.

The film premiered on 24 November 2013 at the International Documentary Film Festival Amsterdam (IDFA).

On 2 January 2014, the film premiered on Dutch national television, when it was broadcast by NTR on channel Nederland 3.

== Synopsis ==
In the documentary, Peled sheds light on the supporters of the Dutch association football club AFC Ajax, who have often referred to themselves as super Jews. What makes the documentary unique, however, is that she offers the perspective of both the supporters, as well as her own personal perspective as an Israeli immigrant living in Amsterdam searching to find her own identity.

Peled herself is the narrator of the documentary, which follows her into the world of Ajax, as well as back to Israel in search of her own Jewish identity, and sometimes critical view of Israel. The film is built around personal, mostly intimate and often revealing interviews, in which Peled is also in front of the camera amongst recordings from the Ajax home-stadium, the Amsterdam ArenA, archival footage from Ajax-supporters from before the Second World War, and unique footage of Ajax supporters visiting Israel in attendance of an away match against Maccabi Tel Aviv.

In the documentary Nirit speaks with the likes of Jeroen and Diana, hardcore Ajax-supporters, Ronald, one of the founders of F-side and creator of the fanzine De Davidster (The Star of David); longtime Ajax-archivist Mr. Schoevaart, former Ajax-chairman Uri Coronel; 11-year-old Ajax-fan Jodi and his single mother; Mrs. Visser, Holocaust survivor and resident of the Jewish retirement home Beth Shalom in Buitenveldert; Shalo Muller, former Jewish masseuse of Ajax; and Avi the owner of CaféTraffic.

As a football outsider, Peled offers a very personal view into the game, the lore of Ajax and its relation to Judaism.

== See also ==
- Judenklub
- Yids, a nickname for the English soccer club Tottenham Hotspur F.C.
- List of ethnic sports team and mascot names
