= Yid =

Jewish ethnonym of Yiddish origin

The word Yid (/ˈjiːd/; Yiddish: איד), also known as the Y-word, is a Jewish ethnonym of Yiddish origin. It is used as an autonym within the Ashkenazi Jewish community, and also used as slang by European football fans, antisemites, and others. Its usage may be controversial in modern English language. It is not usually considered offensive when pronounced /ˈjiːd/ (rhyming with deed), the way Yiddish speakers say it, but some may deem the word offensive nonetheless. When pronounced /ˈjɪd/ (rhyming with did) by non-Jews, it is commonly intended as a pejorative term. It is used as a derogatory epithet by antisemites along with, and as an alternative to, the English word 'Jew'.

In Britain, the word "yid" and its related term "yiddo" are also used to refer to the supporters and players of Tottenham Hotspur. Originally, the word was used in a derogatory manner by rival fans; it is now used as self-designation in a non-pejorative sense by Tottenham fans, according to the second definition in the Oxford English Dictionary. The Football Association, Merriam-Webster, Cambridge Dictionary, and the first definition of the Oxford English Dictionary all state that the word is "offensive".

== Etymology ==
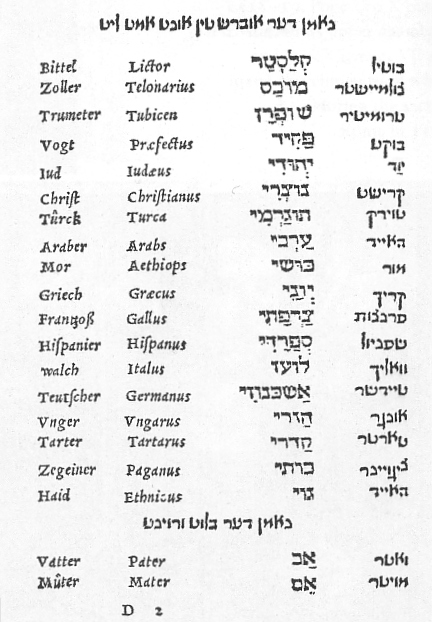
A page from Elia Levita's Yiddish language-Hebrew-Latin-German dictionary (16th century) contains a list of nations, including an entry for Jew: Hebrew: יְהוּדִי Yiddish: יוּד German: Iud Latin: Iudaeus

The term Yid has its origins in the Middle High German word Jüde (the contemporary German word is Jude).

Leo Rosten provides the following etymology:

From the German: Jude: 'Jew.' And 'Jude' is a truncated form of Yehuda, which was the name given to the Jewish Commonwealth in the period of the Second Temple. That name, in turn, was derived from the name of one of Jacob's sons, Yehuda (Judah, in English), whose descendants constituted one of the tribes of Israel and who settled in that portion of Canaan from Jerusalem south to Kadesh-Barnea (50 miles south of Beersheba) and from Jericho westwards to the Mediterranean.

== History ==
The earliest printed mention of the word Yid in English was in The Slang Dictionary published by John Camden Hotten in 1874. Hotten noted that "The Jews use these terms very frequently."

It is uncertain when the word began to be used in a pejorative sense by non-Jews, but some believe it started in the 20th century, likely in the 1930s when there was a large population of Jews and Yiddish speakers in East London where Oswald Mosley also had a strong following. Mosley's supporters were said to have chanted while marching through Jewish areas: "The Yids, the Yids, we gotta get rid of the Yids".

After World War II, most examples of the word Yid are found in the writing of Jewish authors. These occurrences are usually either attempts to accurately portray antisemitic speech, or as self-deprecating Jewish humor. In his 1968 bestseller The Joys of Yiddish, Leo Rosten offers a number of anecdotes from the "Borscht Belt" to illustrate such usage.

The Oxford English Dictionary indicates that the first attested use of the related term "yiddo" for a Jew appeared in 1972.

The words "yid" and "yiddo" have become commonly associated in Britain with fans of Tottenham Hotspur since the 1960s. In January 2020, the Oxford English Dictionary extended the definition of "yid" to "a supporter of or player for Tottenham Hotspur Football Club (traditionally associated with the Jewish community in north and east London).

As of 2022, Merriam-Webster, and the Cambridge Dictionary all categorize the word as "offensive". Oxford English Dictionary, however, noted its change of meaning in British English: "Originally and frequently derogatory and offensive, though later also often as a self-designation."

== Usage in Yiddish ==
In Yiddish, the word "Yid" Yiddish: ייד is neutral or even complimentary, and in Ashkenazi Yiddish-speaking circles it is frequently used to mean simply "fellow," "chap," "buddy," "mate," etc., with no expressed emphasis on Jewishness (although this may be implied by the intra-Jewish context). Plural is יידן [jidn].

In Yiddish, a polite way to address a fellow Jew whose name one does not know is Reb Yid, meaning "Sir." The Yiddish words yidish or yiddisher (from Middle High German jüdisch) is an adjective derived from the noun Yid, and thus means "Jewish".

== Usage in European football ==
A number of European clubs, such as Tottenham Hotspur and Ajax have become associated with being Jewish. In the case of Tottenham Hotspur, rival fans chanted antisemitic taunts including 'Yids' against Tottenham fans. In response some Jewish and non-Jewish fans of Tottenham Hotspur F.C. adopted "Yid" (or "Yiddo") as a nickname and "Yiddo, Yiddo!" as a battle cry and often identify themselves as "Yid Army". While such usage remains controversial, the majority of Tottenham fans support its use in a survey and use the word with pride, and consider the usage an act of reclaiming the word as a badge of honour, nullifying its derogatory meaning when used by rival fans. In a survey, more than half of Jewish fans have no objection to the use of the word by Tottenham fans, but around a quarter preferred for it not to be used. Some Jewish Tottenham supporters consciously use it to identify the club as a bastion against racism and antisemitism. Fans of other clubs use the term as a pejorative because of the perception that many Tottenham Hotspur fans are Jewish. This following started in the early 20th century after the First World War when the club was the team of choice for large numbers of Jewish immigrants in North London and the East End of London – those in East London could easily get cheap buses and trams to Tottenham, heading north along the road later designated the A10. East-end Jews have since mostly moved to the North and East London suburbs, Hertfordshire and Essex, but support for Tottenham Hotspur continues for many Jewish families; for example, all three chairmen of Tottenham since 1984 have been Jewish businessmen with prior history of support for the club.

In 2011, comedian David Baddiel started an antisemitism campaign against the use of the word in football, and debates continued in 2013 when the Football Association warned that supporters who used the word could face criminal charges. Prime Minister David Cameron, however, said that it was not antisemitic when Spurs fans used the word, while Baddiel argued that the word is derogatory. In 2014, the Crown Prosecution Service dropped charges against Tottenham fans for chanting the words as it considered such words as used by Tottenham fans could not legally be counted as 'threatening, abusive or insulting'.

In February 2020, the Oxford English Dictionary expanded its definition of the word 'Yid' to include a "supporter of or player for Tottenham Hotspur. ... Originally and frequently derogatory and offensive, though later also often as a self-designation". It also added the closely related word 'Yiddo' to its latest edition. The club criticised the inclusion as "misleading" as the dictionary does not "distinguish the contexts in which the term is and is not offensive", it said: "As a club we have never accommodated the use of the Y-word on any club channels or in club stores". The "yiddo" entry of the Oxford English Dictionary has since added a note that it is sometimes used as a self-designation by Tottenham Hotspur supporters "now usually without derogatory connotations", as further clarification to its statement "Usually derogatory and offensive".

In 2019, Tottenham Hotspur conducted a consultation and received 23,000 responses from fans about the use of the word. The club conducted the second phase after a pause due to Covid-19, and in 2022, concluded, "We recognise how these members of our fanbase feel and we also believe it is time to move on from associating this term with our Club."

== See also ==
- Zhyd
- Judenklub
