= James McPherson (football coach) =

Scottish football manager

James "Jim" Quar McPherson, (13 April 1891 in Kilmarnock, Scotland – 12 August 1960 in Newcastle upon Tyne, England) was a Scottish football trainer and manager.

== Career ==
=== 1919–1920: Start in the Netherlands - Olympics with Norway - Wales ===
McPherson took up his first position as chief coach in December 1919 at the Dutch club Vitesse in Arnhem, where the former player and president of FC Bayern Munich Willem Hesselink was then president. The club played in the eastern group of the first division. In March 1922, when relegation was avoided thanks to a 4–1 victory over PW from Enschede, a club named after Princess Wilhelmina, he was honored with a wreath. He then left the club. His successor was the former coach of Bayern, Charles Griffiths, under whom the club was relegated in 1922.

=== 1924–1929: FC Bayern - VfB Leipzig and HRC in Holland ===
In April of 1928 he was again in the Netherlands, this time as the successor of the Englishman Herbert "John" Leavey as coach of second division Heldersche Racing Club, usually abbreviated to "HRC", in Den Helder. In the 1928–29 season he finished second behind AVV Zeeburgia. He was succeeded in 1929 by another former English professional James Moore, who opted to become a greengrocer after only one year.
