= Franz John =

German football player (1872-1952)

Franz Adolf Louis John (born 28 September 1872 in Pritzwalk, died 17 November 1952 in East Berlin) was a German football player. He was a founder of Bayern Munich, and acted as their first president from 1900 to 1903.

He was born on 28 September 1872 in Pritzwalk (Brandenburg), the son of Friedrich Wilhelm and Ida John. After moving with his parents to Pankow at the fringe of Berlin, he later joined the football club VfB Pankow. There he met Gustav Manning, who afterwards became secretary of the German Football Association. Manning later helped John to integrate the Munich football clubs into the DFB. After his apprenticeship as a photographer in Jena, John moved to Munich, where he became a member of 1879 Munich.

On 27 February 1900, the steering committee of MTV prohibited the football division of its club to join the association of South Germain football clubs (SFV), eleven football players left the club under the lead of Franz John. In the restaurant Gisela, they founded the Munich Football Club Bayern and elected Franz John as president. John also founded the council of Bavarian referees.

Under his lead, the club joined the SFV still in its first year and quickly became a force in the Munich football scene. In 1903, John left Bayern and was succeeded as president by the Dutch Willem Hesselink. John also left Munich in 1904, moving back to Pankow, where he opened a photo laboratory and later became president of his home club VfB Pankow. Despite having few contacts to Munich, John was in the 1920s elected as honorary president of the Bayern Munich, and in 1936 he received the needle of honour in gold from the club.

John died on 17 November 1952 in Pankow, East Berlin, at the age of 80; he had no descendants. Journalist Joachim Rechenberg later traced his lost grave to Fürstenwalde. When in 2000 Bayern celebrated its 100th anniversary, the club recreated the grave and donated a new tombstone to commemorate the merits of Franz John.
