= Conrad Heidkamp =

German footballer (1905–1994)

Personal information
- Date of birth: 27 September 1905
- Place of birth: Düsseldorf, Germany
- Date of death: 5 March 1994 (aged 88)
- Place of death: Munich, Germany
- Position: Defender

Senior career*
| Years | Team | Apps | (Gls) |
| 1925–1928 | Düsseldorfer SC 99 | | |
| 1928–1936 | Bayern Munich | | |

International career
| 1927–1930 | Germany | 9 | (1) |

Managerial career
- 1943–1945: Bayern Munich
- * Club domestic league appearances and goals

Conrad "Conny" Heidkamp (27 September 1905 – 5 March 1994) was a German footballer who played as a defender for Düsseldorfer SC 99 and Bayern Munich.

Between 1927 and 1930, he won 9 caps with the Germany national team, scoring one goal. He was also part of Germany's team at the 1928 Summer Olympics, but he did not play in any matches.

At Bayern Munich, Heidkamp earned captaincy of the team in 1932 via victory over Eintracht Frankfurt in the final, winning the German football championship. He died in 1994 in Munich.

== Personal life ==
Heidkamp met his wife Magdalene in the spring of 1934, and she nicknamed him "grenadier" because of his shot and accuracy.
