= Richard Kohn =

Austrian footballer (1888–1963)

Personal information
- Date of birth: 27 September 1888
- Place of birth: Vienna, Austria-Hungary
- Date of death: 16 June 1963 (aged 75)
- Position: Midfielder

Senior career*
Years	Team	Apps	(Gls)
1904-1909	Wiener AC		
1910	MTK Budapest		
1910	Wiener AC		
1910-1913	Wiener AF		
1913	Wiener Amateur SV		
1913-1914	Wiener AC		
1919-1920	Germania Schwechat		

International career
1907–1912	Austria	7	(2)

Managerial career
- 1923–1924: Hertha BSC
- 1924–1925: HŠK Građanski
- First Vienna
- 1926–1927: FC Barcelona
- 1927–1927: KS Warszawianka
- 1928–1930: 1860 Munich
- 1930–1931: VfR Mannheim
- 1931–1933: Bayern Munich
- 1933–1934: FC Barcelona
- 1934: FC Basel
- 1935–1939: Feyenoord
- FC Zurich
- 1951–1952: Feyenoord
- 1954–1955: EBOH
- 1955–1956: Feyenoord
- * Club domestic league appearances and goals

Richard Kohn (27 September 1888 – 16 June 1963) was an Austrian football player and later coach of FC Bayern Munich, FC Barcelona and Feyenoord Rotterdam. He was Jewish, born in Vienna. His nickname was Dambi or Little Dambi. He was also known as John Little(s), Jack Domby, de Hongaarse wonderdokter (the Hungarian wonder doctor), and Ricardo Domby. He developed cataracts later in life and was forced to quit sports.

== Playing career ==
Before World War I he played for Wiener AC and Wiener AF and Wiener Amateur SV. Kohn was renowned for his good technique. He had seven appearances for the Austria national football team (1907–1912) and scored two times. He scored for WAF when they played Middlesex Wanderers on 26 May 1912. He was also part of Austria's squad for the football tournament at the 1912 Summer Olympics, but he did not play in any matches.

== Coaching career ==
Little is known about the early years of his career. In the 1920s he managed Građanski Zagreb and Sportfreunde Stuttgart and Hertha BSC from 1924 to 1925. He then went to First Vienna FC which he left for Barcelona for a first stint from February 1926 to 1927. He afterwards left TSV 1860 Munich for VfR Mannheim for a year. Upon leaving for FC Bayern Munich, convincing the gifted player Oskar Rohr to follow him there. With Rohr and Conny Heidkamp he formed a strong team in Munich and in 1932 won the German championship with Bayern in a final victory against Eintracht Frankfurt.

After the Nazis rise to power, the Jewish Kohn left Germany initially for Switzerland, but he soon got another engagement with FC Barcelona. His second stint there was not very successful and ended early in February 1934 when he was replaced with the player Ramón Zabalo. He then went to Switzerland where he coached Basel for a season, finishing fifth in the league. From 1935 to 1939, 1951 to 1952, and 1955 to 1956 he managed Feyenoord Rotterdam, winning the Dutch league in 1935–36 and 1937–38. He acted as a coach and physio, and was known for magical potions, which helped to cure injured players.

== Career statistics ==
Appearances and goals by national team and year
National team	Year	Apps	Goals
Austria
Austria	1908	1	1
Austria	1910	1	0
Austria	1911	2	0
Austria	1912	2	1
Total		6	2

As of match played 22 August 1912. Austria score listed first, score column indicates score after each Richard goal.

International goals by date, venue, cap, opponent, score, result and competition
No.	Date	Venue	Cap	Opponent	Score	Result	Competition
1	3 May 1908	Hohe Warte Stadium, Vienna, Austria-Hungary	1	Hungary	4–0	4–0	Friendly
2	22 December 1912	Stadio Comunale, Genoa, Kingdom of Italy	6	Italy	3–1	3–1	Friendly

== See also ==
- List of Jewish footballers
- Floor de Zeeuw – Kohn's assistant coach at Feyenoord
