= List of ethnic sports team and mascot names =

Many sports team mascots are named for an ethnic group or similar category of people. Though these names typically refer to a group native to the area in which the sports team is based, many teams take their names from groups which are known for their strength (such as Spartans or Vikings), despite not being located near the historic homes of these groups.

== Professional teams ==
=== American ===
- Allen Americans (ECHL) – Allen, Texas, USA
- Houston Texans (National Football League) – Houston, Texas, USA
- New York Knicks (NBA) – New York City, New York, USA. The name "Knick" is a shortened version of the word "Knickerbocker", a term which comes from a pseudonym used by Washington Irving in his book, A History of New York. The term was used to refer to the descendants of the original Dutch settlers of New York. Later, by extension, the term was used to describe New Yorkers in general.
- New York Yankees (Major League Baseball) – New York City, New York, USA
- Rochester Americans (American Hockey League) – Rochester, New York, USA
- Tri-City Americans (Western Hockey League) – Kennewick, Washington, USA

=== Bavarians ===
- FC Bayern Munich (Association football) – Munich, Germany

=== Boers ===
- Indios del Bóer ("Indians of the Boer") (Baseball) – Managua, Nicaragua

=== Canadian ===
==== Canadians in general ====
- Vancouver Canucks (National Hockey League) – Vancouver, British Columbia
- Vancouver Canadians (Northwest League) - Vancouver, British Columbia

==== French Canadians ====
- Montreal Canadiens (National Hockey League) – Montreal, Quebec, Canada

=== Celtic/Irish ===
- Boston Celtics (NBA) – Boston, Massachusetts, USA
- Celta de Vigo – Galician football team whose name reflects Celtic people.
- Celtic FC – Scottish football team whose name reflects Celtic people, both Scottish and Irish.
- Hibernian FC – Scottish football club reflecting Irish origins.
- London Irish (Premiership Rugby) – Brentford, Greater London, England

=== Cornish ===
- London Cornish (Rugby Union) – London, England

=== Cossacks ===
- Vinnytski Haidamaky (Ukrainian Hockey Championship) – Vinnytsia, Ukraine
- Kozakken Boys (Tweede Divisie) — Werkendam, Netherlands

=== Egyptian ===
- Al Masry SC – Port Said, Egypt
- Egypt national football team The Pharaohs – Alexandria and Cairo, Egypt

=== Indian ===
- Mumbai Indians, Cricket, (Indian Premier League) – Mumbai, Maharashtra, India

=== Italian ===
- Audax Italiano – Chilean Football club based in La Florida, Chile
- Brooklyn Italians – U.S. Football (soccer) team based in Brooklyn, New York

=== Poles ===
- Polonia Warsaw – Polish Football (soccer) team, founded when Poland was not an independent country

=== Roslagen ===
- Rospiggarna (Allsvenskan)

=== Saxons ===
- The England Saxons, the country's second men's rugby union XV, formerly known as England A

=== Scots/Highlanders ===
- Edmonton Scottish (AMSL) – Edmonton, Alberta, Canada
- Highlanders, a team based in Otago, New Zealand, named for the Scottish population of the area.
- London Scottish F.C. (RFU Championship) – Richmond, London, England
- Victoria Highlanders (USL League Two) – Victoria, British Columbia, Canada

=== Spaniards ===
- Deportivo Español, Parque Avellaneda, Argentina
- RCD Espanyol, Barcelona
- Real Club España, Mexico City
- San Diego Padres (MLB), San Diego, California, USA
- Unión Española, Independencia, Chile

==== Alavese ====
- Deportivo Alavés, Vitoria-Gasteiz, Spain

==== Asturians ====
- Asturias F.C., Mexico City

=== Viking ===
- Canberra Raiders (NRL) – Canberra, Australia – viking logo
- Canberra Vikings (NRC) – Canberra, Australia
- Minnesota Vikings (NFL) – Minneapolis, Minnesota, USA
- Viking FK (Eliteserien) – Stavanger, Norway
- Víkingur (Úrvalsdeild) – Reykjavík, Iceland

== School and youth teams ==
=== Arabs ===
- Coachella Valley High School, Coachella, California, USA. The nickname has been changed to "Mighty Arabs" and the cartoonish "Arab" mascot and logo have been retired.

=== Athenians ===
- Mount St. Mary's University, Los Angeles, California

=== Britons ===
- Albion College, Albion, Michigan

=== Cajuns ===
- Metairie Park Country Day School, Metairie, Louisiana
- University of Louisiana, Lafayette, Louisiana

=== Celtics ===
- Carlow University, Pittsburgh, Pennsylvania
- Crespi Carmelite High School, Los Angeles, California
- Dublin Jerome High School, Dublin, Ohio
- Providence Catholic High School, New Lenox, Illinois
- Roanoke Catholic School, Roanoke, Virginia

=== Dutchmen ===
- Hope College, Holland, Michigan – Flying Dutchmen
- Union College, Schenectady, New York
- Edgerton High School, Edgerton, Minnesota – Flying Dutchmen

=== Gaels ===
- Bishop Gorman High School, Las Vegas
- Iona University, New Rochelle, New York
- Queen's University, Kingston, Ontario
- Saint Mary's College, Moraga, California

=== Irish ===
- Bishop McGuinness Catholic High School, Oklahoma City, Oklahoma
- Camden Catholic High School, Cherry Hill, New Jersey
- Cathedral High School, Indianapolis, Indiana
- Central Catholic High School, Toledo, Ohio
- Notre Dame High School, Chattanooga, Tennessee
- Notre Dame High School (New Jersey), Lawrence Township, Mercer County, New Jersey
- Notre Dame Preparatory School and Marist Academy, Pontiac, Michigan
- O'Dea High School, Seattle, Washington
- St. Vincent–St. Mary High School, Akron, Ohio
- University of Notre Dame, South Bend, Indiana

=== Norse ===
- Luther College, Decorah, Iowa
- Northern Kentucky University, Highland Heights, Kentucky

=== Saxons ===
- Alfred University, Village of Alfred, New York

=== Scots/Highlanders ===
- Alma College, Alma, Michigan – Scots
- Carlmont High School, Belmont, California – Scots
- College of Wooster, Wooster, Ohio – Fighting Scots
- Covenant College, Lookout Mountain, Georgia – Scots
- Edinboro University, Edinboro, Pennsylvania
- Heathwood Hall Episcopal School, Columbia, South Carolina – Highlanders
- Gordon College, Boston, Massachusetts – Fighting Scots
- Incline High School, Incline Village, Nevada - Highlanders
- Lyon College, Batesville, Arkansas – Scots
- Macalester College, Saint Paul, Minnesota – Fighting Scots
- McHenry County College, McHenry County, Illinois – Scots
- Maryville College, Maryville, Tennessee – Scots
- Monmouth College, Monmouth, Illinois – Fighting Scots
- New Jersey Institute of Technology, Newark, New Jersey
- Ohio Valley University, Vienna, West Virginia – Fighting Scots
- Presbyterian College, Clinton, South Carolina – Nickname is Blue Hose, mascot is Scotty the Scotsman
- Radford University, Radford, Virginia
- Rochester Adams High School, Rochester Hills, Michigan – Highlanders
- Scotland High School, Laurinburg, North Carolina – Fighting Scots
- Shadle Park High School, Spokane, Washington – Highlanders (Based on the Henderson Clan)
- University of California, Riverside, California

=== Swedes ===
- Bethany College, Lindsborg, Kansas – Terrible Swedes
- Gothenburg High School, Gothenburg, Nebraska – Swedes

=== Tartars ===
- El Camino College Compton Center, Compton, California
- Compton High School, Compton, California – In reference to the college, the high school is the "tarbabes".

=== Trojans ===
- University of Arkansas at Little Rock, Little Rock, Arkansas
- Troy University, Troy, Alabama
- University of Southern California, Los Angeles, California

=== Vandals ===
- University of Idaho, Moscow, Idaho

=== Vikings ===
- Augustana College, Rock Island, Illinois
- Augustana University, Sioux Falls, South Dakota
- Bethany Lutheran College, Mankato, Minnesota
- Cleveland State University, Cleveland, Ohio
- Downey High School, Downey, California
- Homewood-Flossmoor High School, Flossmoor, Illinois
- Lynbrook High School, San Jose, California
- Miamisburg High School, Miamisburg, Ohio
- Northern Kentucky University, Highland Heights, Kentucky – Nickname is Norse; mascot is Victor E. Viking.
- Portland State University, Portland, Oregon
- Tarboro High School, Tarboro, North Carolina
- Western Washington University, Bellingham, Washington
- Vanguard College Preparatory School, Waco, Texas

== Defunct names ==
- Atlanta Black Crackers – (Negro league baseball team)
- C.D. Euzkadi (los vascos, "the Basques") - Mexican football team (1938-1939)
- Cleveland Indians - (Major League Baseball), Cleveland, Ohio, now the Guardians
- Cincinnati Cubans – (Negro league baseball team)
- Edmonton Eskimos – (Canadian Football League) – Edmonton, Alberta. Name use discontinued in 2020. Team rebranded as the Elks in 2021 after interim period as "EE Football Team."
- Hermosillo Seris
- Hofstra Flying Dutchmen, now the "Pride"
- MacMurray College, Jacksonville, Illinois – mascot was the Highlander
- Nebraska Wesleyan Plainsmen, today the "Prairie Wolves"
- New York Americans – (National Hockey League, 1925–1941), New York City, New York
- New York Black Yankees – (Negro league baseball team), New York City, New York
- New York Cubans – (Negro league baseball team), New York City, New York
- New York Highlanders (Major League Baseball), New York City, New York, now the Yankees
- Pekin High School (Pekin, Illinois) Chinks, now the "Dragons"
- Quebec Nordiques – (World Hockey Association 1972–1979, National Hockey League 1979–1995), Quebec City, Quebec, now the Colorado Avalanche
- San Antonio Black Indians – (Negro league baseball team)
- Sonoma State University Cossacks, now the Seawolves
- Washington Redskins (National Football League) – Washington, D.C., USA. Name use discontinued in 2020. Team rebranded as the Commanders after interim period as "Washington Football Team."
- Wayne State Tartars, now the Warriors.

== See also ==
- Midget § Mascots
- Indigenous peoples
- List of university and college nickname changes in the United States
