= Kurt Landauer =

German businessman

Kurt Landauer (28 July 1884 – 21 December 1961) was a German football official. His profession was often listed as Kaufmann ("merchant"), he was head of the advertising department of the major Munich daily newspaper Münchner Neueste Nachrichten, considered a precursor to Süddeutsche Zeitung, which commenced publication after World War II. His claim to fame is his four tenures as the president of the football club FC Bayern Munich between 1913 and 1951. To date, he remains the president with the longest time in office.

Landauer was born in Planegg (close to Munich), and joined Bayern in 1901 as a player. He had to leave for Lausanne shortly afterwards, but returned to Munich in 1905. In 1913 he was elected president of the club for the first time but World War I ended his tenure in 1914. When Landauer returned to Munich after the war he was elected for a second tenure as president. This lasted until 1933 with a one-year intermission in 1921–22. He was the first to take the club to national championship honours, when Bayern defeated Eintracht Frankfurt in the final of 1932. Again Landauer was forced to leave the club due to political events. The rise of the Nazis to power made him resign office on 22 March 1933.

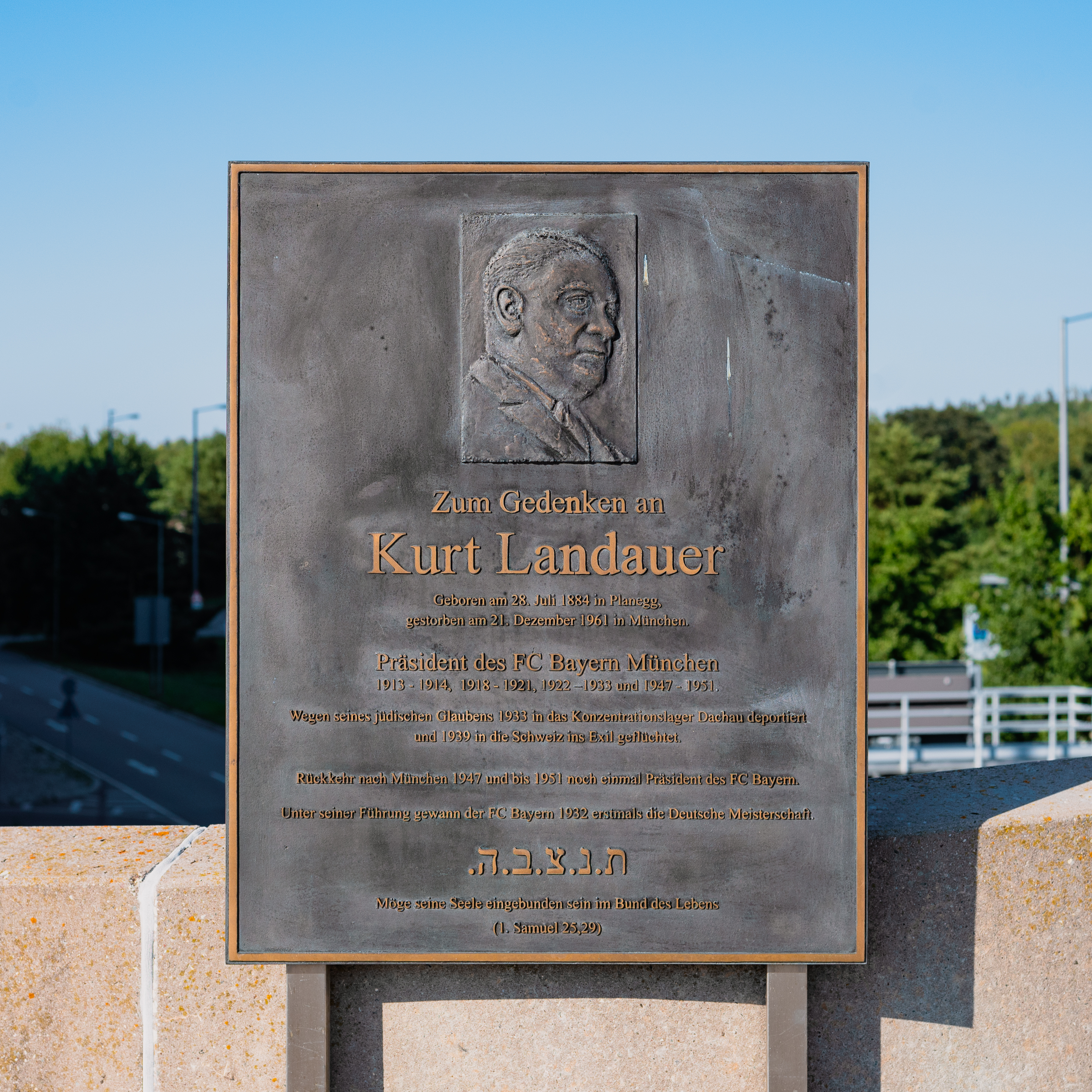
Plaque near the Allianz Arena commemorating Kurt Landauer.

Being Jewish, Landauer was arrested by the Nazis on 10 November 1938 and transported to KZ Dachau. Because of his military service in World War I, he was allowed to leave Dachau after 33 days under arrest. He emigrated to Switzerland on 15 March 1939. Only one of his family members survived the Holocaust. In 1940 Bayern Munich went to Geneva for a friendly against the Swiss national team. When the players spotted Landauer, who was amongst the spectators they went to greet their former president. The Gestapo was not amused and threatened that this behaviour would have consequences.

In 1947 Landauer returned a third time to Munich and was once again appointed club president. This tenure lasted until 1951 when he was not elected again. Landauer died on 21 December 1961 in Munich.

Up to now he is the club's president with the longest accumulated tenure, Wilhelm Neudecker (†) (1962–79), widely considered as the "father of the modern FC Bayern", and Franz Beckenbauer (1994–2009) being the ones with the longest periods in office after him.

In autumn 2014 the Bavarian Broadcasting Corporation (Bayerischer Rundfunk) initiated a transmedia project on the life of Kurt Landauer. This project included a TV-series, social media and an augmented reality app.
