= Germany national football team results (1908–1929) =

This is a list of international football matches of the Germany national football team from 1908 until 1929.

Between their first match in 1908 and 1929, Germany played in 74 matches, resulting in 26 victories, 14 draws and 34 defeats. Germany made steady progress from early heavy defeats to England's amateur squad, managing to win two games in a row only in 1924.

Throughout this period they participated in two Olympic Football Tournaments in 1912 and in 1928, and on both occasions, Germany failed to go any further than the quarter-finals. On the latter occasion, they were eliminated by the eventual champions Uruguay in what was their first-ever game against a non-European team. Notable figures during these years was Gottfried Fuchs who become Germany's all-time top scorer with 13 goals after scoring 10 goals in a 16–0 win against Russia at the 1912 Olympic consolation tournament, becoming the top scorer of the tournament.

== Results ==
=== 1908 ===
| 5 April 1908 International Friendly | Switzerland | 5–3 | Germany | Basel, Switzerland |
| 15:00 (UTC+1:00) | Kämpfer 21', 89'; Jordan 28' (o.g.); Pfeiffer 32', 57' | Report | Becker 6', 69'; Förderer 52' | Stadium: Landhof; Attendance: 3,500; Referee: Patrick Devitte (Switzerland) |
Note: First official match (also first away match); first goal for Germany (by Fritz Becker); first own-goal for Germany (by Ernst Jordan) first defeat (also first away defeat).

| 20 April 1908 International Friendly | England Amateurs | 5–1 | Germany | Berlin-Mariendorf, Germany |
| 15:00 (UTC+1:00) | Stapley 5', 70'; Woodward 25', 90'; Purnell 43' | Report; Report | Förderer 17' (pen.) | Stadium: Viktoria field Attendance: 6,000; Referee: Paul Neumann (Germany) |
Note: First match against England (Am); first home match; first home defeat.

| 7 June 1908 International Friendly | Austria | 3–2 | Germany | Vienna, Austria |
| 18:00 (UTC+1:00) | Dlabac 7' (pen.); Studnicka 41'; Andres 44' | Report | Kipp 6'; Jäger 28' | Stadium: Cricketer-Platz; Attendance: 5,000; Referee: Wagstaffe Simmons (England) |
Note: First match against Austria.

=== 1909 ===
| 13 March 1909 International Friendly | England Amateurs | 9–0 | Germany | Oxford, England |
| 15:30 | Porter ?', ?', ?'; Hoare ?', ?'; Dunning ?', ?', ?'; Chapman ?' | Report; Report | | Stadium: Oxford Ground; Attendance: 6,000; Referee: Thomas Kyle (England) |
Note: Biggest defeat and biggest away defeat.

| 4 April 1909 International Friendly | Germany | 1–0 | Switzerland | Karlsruhe, Germany |
| 15:00 (UTC+1:00) | Kipp 38' | Report | | Stadium: KFV Telegrafenkaserne ground Attendance: 7,000; Referee: Albert Sohn (Germany) |
Note: First win (also first home win).

| 4 April 1909 International Friendly | Hungary | 3–3 | Germany | Budapest, Hungary |
| 16:00 (UTC+1:00) | Borbás 4'; Schlosser 28'; Sebestyén 60' | Report | Worpitzky 5', 33'; Ugi 79' (pen.) | Stadium: Millenáris Sporttelep; Attendance: 9,000; Referee: Hugo Meisl (Austria) |
Note: First match against Hungary; first draw (also first away draw).

=== 1910 ===
| 3 April 1910 International Friendly | Switzerland | 2–3 | Germany | Basel, Switzerland |
| 15:00 (UTC+1:00) | Müller 35'; Renand 58' | Report | Hiller 8'; Kipp 55', 85' | Stadium: Landhof; Attendance: 5,000; Referee: Patrick Devitte (Switzerland) |
Note: First away win and Eugen Kipp set the goal scoring record for Germany (4 goals)

| 24 April 1910 International Friendly | Netherlands | 4–2 | Germany | Arnhem, Netherlands |
| 14:30 (UTC+0:20) | Lutjens 29'; Thomée 73', 87'; Hempel 82' (o.g.) | Report | Kipp 23'; Fick 42' | Stadium: Klarenbeek Stadium; Attendance: 10,000; Referee: Jack Howcroft (England) |
Note: First match against Netherlands. Eugen Kipp set the goal scoring record for Germany (5 goals)

| 16 May 1910 International Friendly | Germany | 0–3 | Belgium | Duisburg, Germany |
| 16:30 (UTC+0:20) | | Report | Saeys 20', 48'; Van Staceghem 75' | Stadium: Sportplatz am Grunewald; Attendance: 8,000; Referee: Herbert Willing (Netherlands) |
Note: First match against Belgium and the first substitution when Andreas Breynk came-on for Dr.Joseph Bauwens in the 55th minute.

| 16 October 1910 International Friendly | Germany | 1–2 | Netherlands | Kleve, Germany |
| 15:30 (UTC+1:00) | Queck 25' | Report | Thomée 7' van Berckel 16' | Stadium: Sportplatz an der Triftstraße; Attendance: 4,000; Referee: Hubert Istace (Belgium) |

=== 1911 ===
| 26 March 1911 International Friendly | Germany | 6–2 | Switzerland | Stuttgart, Germany |
| 15:30 (UTC+1:00) | Fuchs 35'; Breunig 43' (pen.); Kipp 71'; Förderer 78', 88'; Gablonsky 90' | Report | Weiss 52'; Collet 80' | Stadium: Kickers-Stadion Degerloch; Attendance: 8,000; Referee: Hubert Istace (Belgium) |
Note: Eugen Kipp set the goal scoring record for Germany (6 goals)

| 14 April 1911 International Friendly | Germany | 2–2 | England Amateurs | Berlin-Mariendorf, Germany |
| 16:00 (UTC+1:00) | Möller 48', 50' | Report; Report | Webb 17'; Wright 65' | Stadium: Union ground Attendance: 10,000; Referee: Herbert Willing (Netherlands) |
Note: First home draw.

| 23 April 1911 International Friendly | Belgium | 2–1 | Germany | Liège, Belgium |
| 15:00 | Vanhoute 32'; Saeys 85' | Report | Förderer 50' | Stadium: Stade Maurice Dufrasne; Attendance: 3,000; Referee: Dicky Schumacher (England) |

| 18 June 1911 International Friendly | Sweden | 2–4 | Germany | Solna, Sweden |
| 13:30 (UTC+1:00) | Gustafsson 28', 29' | Report | Dumke 13', 44', 83'; Kipp 16' | Stadium: Råsundastadion; Attendance: 3,000; Referee: Charles Buchwald (Denmark) |
Note: First match against Sweden and Eugen Kipp set the goal scoring record for Germany (7 goals)

| 10 September 1911 International Friendly | Germany | 1–2 | Austria | Dresden, Germany |
| | Worpitzky 35' | Report | Neumann 25'; Špindler 49' | Stadium: Güntzwiesen Sport Ground; Attendance: 7,500; Referee: Herbert Willing (Netherlands) |

| 29 October 1911 International Friendly | Germany | 1–3 | Sweden | Hamburg, Germany |
| 15:00 (UTC+1:00) | Möller 80' | Report | Börjesson 15', 35'; Ohlson 60' | Stadium: Stadion Hoheluft; Attendance: 6,000; Referee: Herbert Willing (Netherlands) |

| 17 December 1911 International Friendly | Germany | 1–4 | Hungary | Munich, Germany |
| 14:00 (UTC+1:00) | Worpitzky 48' | Report | Sebestyén 24'; Schlosser 43', 74'; Bodnár 66' | Stadium: Männer-Turn-Verein; Attendance: 8,000; Referee: Hugo Meisl (Austria) |

=== 1912 ===
| 24 March 1912 International Friendly | Netherlands | 5–5 | Germany | Zwolle, Netherlands |
| 14:30 (UTC+0:20) | Thomée 5', 53'; Francken 34', 47'; Breunig 66' (o.g.) | Report | Fuchs 13'; Hirsch 14', 31', 75', 79' | Stadium: ZAC-Platz Veerallee; Attendance: 10,000; Referee: Jack Howcroft (England) |
Note: Highest scoring draw.

| 14 April 1912 International Friendly | Hungary | 4–4 | Germany | Budapest, Hungary |
| 16:00 (UTC+0:20) | Schlosser 9'; Bodnár 59', 65', 75' | Report | Möller 15'; Kipp 17'; Worpitzky 25'; Jäger 44' (pen.) | Stadium: Üllői úti stadion Attendance: 25,000; Referee: Hugo Meisl (Austria) |
Note: Eugen Kipp set the goal scoring record for Germany (8 goals)

| 5 May 1912 International Friendly | Switzerland | 1–2 | Germany | Espenmoos, Switzerland |
| | Weiss 43' (pen.) | Report | Kipp 6'; Mechling 9' | Stadium: St. Gallen; Attendance: 5,200; Referee: Patrick Devitte (Switzerland) |
Note: Eugen Kipp set the goal scoring record for Germany (9 goals)

| 29 June 1912 1912 Olympic Games First Round | Austria | 5–1 | Germany | Stockholm |
| 15:00 (UTC+1:00) | Merz 75', 81'; Studnicka 58'; Neubauer 62'; Cimera 89' | Report | Jäger 35' | Stadium: Råsunda Stadium; Attendance: 2,000; Referee: Humbert Willing (Netherlands) |
Note: First match at neutral venue; first match at Olympic Games.

| 1 July 1912 1912 Summer Olympics consolation tournament First Round | Germany | 16–0 | Russia | Solna, Stockholm |
| 17:00 (UTC+1:00) | Fuchs 2', 9', 21', 28', 34', 46', 51', 55', 65', 69'; Förderer 6', 27', 53', 66'; Burger 30'; Oberle 58' | Report | | Stadium: Råsunda IP; Attendance: 2,000; Referee: Christiaan Groothoff (Netherlands) |
Note: First match against Russia; biggest win (also biggest win at neutral venue) and first double-digit win; and Gottfried Fuchs set the goal scoring record for Germany (12 goals).

| 3 July 1912 1912 Olympics consolation tournament Semi-final | Hungary | 3–1 | Germany | Stockholm |
| 15:00 (UTC+1:00) | Schlosser 3', 39', 82' | Report | Förderer 56' | Stadium: Tranebergs Idrottsplats; Attendance: 2,000; Referee: Christiaan Groothoff (Netherlands) |

| 6 October 1912 International Friendly | Denmark | 3–1 | Germany | Copenhagen, Denmark |
| 14:00 (UTC+1:00) | Middelboe 22', 67'; Olsen 55' | Report | Jäger 85' (pen.) | Stadium: Idrætspark; Attendance: 10,000; Referee: Herbert Willing (Netherlands) |
Note: First match against Denmark.

| 17 November 1912 International Friendly | Germany | 2–3 | Netherlands | Leipzig, Germany |
| 14:30 (UTC+1:00) | Jäger 27', 65' | Report | Francken 15', 74'; Haak 56' | Stadium: Sport ground Attendance: 10,000; Referee: Ede Herczog (Hungary) |

=== 1913 ===
| 21 March 1913 International Friendly | Germany | 0–3 | England Amateurs | Berlin-Mariendorf, Germany |
| 16:00 (UTC+1:00) | | Report; Report | Douglas 22', 70'; Woodward 43' | Stadium: Viktoria field Attendance: 17,000; Referee: Herbert Willing (Netherlands) |

| 18 May 1913 International Friendly | Germany | 1–2 | Switzerland | Freiburg, Germany |
| 16:00 (UTC+1:00) | Kipp 43' | Report | Collet 10'; Märki 25' | Stadium: FFC-Platz Schwarzwaldstraße; Attendance: 10,000; Referee: Charles Barette (Belgium) |

| 26 October 1913 International Friendly | Germany | 1–4 | Denmark | Hamburg, Germany |
| 15:00 (UTC+1:00) | Jäger 44' | Report | Nielsen 5', 7', 42', 87' | Stadium: Stadion Hoheluft; Attendance: 15,000; Referee: Herbert Willing (Netherlands) |

| 23 November 1913 International Friendly | Belgium | 6–2 | Germany | Antwerp, Belgium |
| 14:00 | Brébart 16', 41', 63'; Van Cant 27', 28', 87' | Report | Wegele 55'; Fuchs 67' | Stadium: Stadion Broodstraat; Attendance: 6,500; Referee: Albert Meerum Terwogt (Netherlands) |
Note: Biggest defeat against Belgium and Gottfried Fuchs set the goal scoring record for Germany (13 goals).

=== 1914 ===
| 5 April 1914 International Friendly | Netherlands | 4–4 | Germany | Amsterdam, Netherlands |
| 14:30 (UTC+0:20) | Vos 34'; Buitenweg 66', 82'; Lotsij 79' | Report | Queck 49'; Jäger 55'; Harder 66'; Wegele 90' | Stadium: Altes Stadium; Attendance: 22,129; Referee: Jack Howcroft (England) |
Note: Final match before the outbreak of the First World War, and this draw meant the end of longest run of defeats (7 matches).

=== 1920 ===
| 27 June 1920 International Friendly | Switzerland | 4–1 | Germany | Zürich, Switzerland |
| 15:00 (UTC+1:00) | Meyer 19', 38'; Afflerbach 43'; Ramseyer 77' | Report | Jäger 79' | Stadium: Utogrund; Attendance: 8,000; Referee: László Bálint (Hungary) |
Note: First match after the First World War.

| 26 September 1920 International Friendly | Austria | 3–2 | Germany | Vienna, Austria |
| 15:30 (UTC+1:00) | Swatosch 64', 83', 86' | Report | Sutor 56'; Seiderer 87' | Stadium: Simmeringer Had; Attendance: 30,000; Referee: Ákos Fehéry (Hungary) |

| 24 October 1920 International Friendly | Germany | 1–0 | Hungary | Berlin, Germany |
| 15:30 (UTC+1:00) | Jäger 22' (pen.) | Report | | Stadium: Deutsches Stadion; Attendance: 55,000; Referee: Jacques Hirrlé (Switzerland) |
Note: First win after longest winless run (1 draw, 9 defeats).

=== 1921 ===
| 5 May 1921 International Friendly | Germany | 3–3 | Austria | Dresden, Germany |
| 16:00 (UTC+1:00) | Popp 7'; Träg 14'; Seiderer 58' | Report | Kuthan 33' (pen.); Wondrak 68'; Uridil 70' | Stadium: Stadion am Ostragehege; Attendance: 20,000; Referee: Willem Eijmers (Netherlands) |

| 5 June 1921 International Friendly | Hungary | 3–0 | Germany | Budapest, Hungary |
| 17:30 (UTC+1:00) | Schlosser 10'; Guttmann 29'; Braun 47' | Report | | Stadium: MTK-Stadion; Attendance: 30,000; Referee: Heinrich Retschury (Austria) |
Note: First substutition made by opposition when György Orth left for Dezsö Gencsy)

| 18 September 1921 International Friendly | Finland | 3–3 | Germany | Helsinki, Finland |
| 13:00 (UTC+2:00) | Eklöf 12'; Thorn 54'; Öhman 88' | Report | Herberger 5', 66'; Kalb 7' | Stadium: Töölön Pallokenttä; Attendance: 8,000; Referee: Gösta Björk (Sweden) |
Note: First match against Finland.

=== 1922 ===
| 26 March 1922 International Friendly | Germany | 2–2 | Switzerland | Frankfurt, Germany |
| 16:00 (UTC+1:00) | Franz 26'; Seiderer 34' | Report | Sturzenegger 72'; Merkt 86' | Stadium: Riederwaldstadion; Attendance: 35,000; Referee: Willem Boas (Netherlands) |

| 23 April 1922 International Friendly | Austria | 0–2 | Germany | Vienna, Austria |
| 16:30 (UTC+1:00) | | Report | Weißenbacher 69'; Jäger 77' | Stadium: Hohe Warte Stadium; Attendance: 70,000; Referee: Ferenc Gerő (Hungary) |

| 2 July 1922 International Friendly | Germany | 0–0 | Hungary | Bochum, Germany |
| 17:00 (UTC+1:00) | | Report | | Stadium: Stadion an der Castroper Straße; Attendance: 35,000; Referee: Heinrich Retschury (Austria) |
Note: First scoreless match.

=== 1923 ===
| 1 January 1923 International Friendly | Italy | 3–1 | Germany | Milan, Italy |
| 14:30 (UTC+1:00) | Cevenini 79'; Santamaria 85'; Migliavacca 88' | Report | Seiderer 72' | Stadium: San Siro; Attendance: 25,000; Referee: Eugène Stutz (Switzerland) |
Note: First match against Italy.

| 10 May 1923 International Friendly | Germany | 0–0 | Netherlands | Hamburg, Germany |
| 16:00 (UTC+1:00) | | Report | | Stadium: Stadion Hoheluft; Attendance: 25,000; Referee: Artur Björklund (Sweden) |

| 3 June 1923 International Friendly | Switzerland | 1–2 | Germany | Basel, Switzerland |
| 15:00 (UTC+1:00) | Pache 86' | Report | Hartmann 3', 71' | Stadium: Schützenmatte; Attendance: 17,000; Referee: Giovanni Mauro (Italy) |

| 29 June 1923 International Friendly | Sweden | 2–1 | Germany | Stockholm, Sweden |
| 19:00 (UTC+1:00) | Seiderer 43' | Report | H. Dahl 47'; A. Dahl 64' | Stadium: Olympic Stadium; Attendance: 16,000; Referee: Ragnvald Smedvik (Norway) |

| 12 August 1923 International Friendly | Germany | 1–2 | Finland | Dresden, Germany |
| 16:00 (UTC+1:00) | Claus-Oehler 31' | Report | Müller 10' (o.g.); Linna 27' | Stadium: Dresdner Kampfbahn; Attendance: 25,000; Referee: Job Mutters (Netherlands) |

| 4 November 1923 International Friendly | Germany | 1–0 | Norway | Hamburg, Germany |
| | Harder 22' | Report | | Stadium: Stadion Hoheluft; Attendance: 20,000; Referee: Theo van Zwieteren (Netherlands) |
Note: First match against Norway.

=== 1924 ===
| 13 January 1924 International Friendly | Germany | 4–3 | Austria | Nuremberg, Germany |
| 15:00 (UTC+1:00) | Auer 24'; Franz 35', 42' (pen.), 72' | Report | Swatosch 67'; Jiszda 79'; Horvath 83' | Stadium: Zabo; Attendance: 20,000; Referee: Ernst Hebak (Czechoslovakia) |

| 21 April 1924 International Friendly | Netherlands | 0–1 | Germany | Amsterdam, Netherlands |
| 14:30 (UTC+1:20) | | Report | Auer 14' | Stadium: Altes Stadium; Attendance: 26,000; Referee: Félix Herren (Switzerland) |

| 15 June 1924 International Friendly | Norway | 0–2 | Germany | Oslo, Norway |
| 12:30 (UTC+1:00) | | Report | Sutor 16'; Wieder 36' | Stadium: Ullevaal Stadion; Attendance: 6,000; Referee: Artur Björklund (Sweden) |

| 31 August 1924 International Friendly | Germany | 1–4 | Sweden | Berlin, Germany |
| 16:30 (UTC+1:00) | Harder 28' | Report | Wenzel 19'; Malm 80'; Rydberg 81'; Carlsson 89' | Stadium: Deutsches Stadion; Attendance: 20,000; Referee: Félix Herren (Switzerland) |
Note: Germany play with six debutants, as the players of SpVgg Fürth and 1. FC Nürnberg refused to play together in the national team.

| 21 September 1924 International Friendly | Hungary | 4–1 | Germany | Budapest, Hungary |
| 16:00 (UTC+1:00) | Szentmiklóssy 33'; Lang 42' (o.g.); Takács 49', 64' | Report | Harder 56' | Stadium: Ferencváros-Stadion; Attendance: 35,000; Referee: Heinrich Retschury (Austria) |

| 23 November 1924 International Friendly | Germany | 0–1 | Italy | Duisburg, Germany |
| 14:00 (UTC+1:00) | | Report | Janni 56' | Stadium: Wedaustadion; Attendance: 40,000; Referee: Theo van Zwieteren (Netherlands) |

| 14 December 1924 International Friendly | Germany | 1–1 | Switzerland | Stuttgart, Germany |
| 14:00 (UTC+1:00) | Harder 71' | Report | Dietrich 26' | Stadium: Stuttgarter Sport Club Stadium; Attendance: 25,000; Referee: Job Mutters (Netherlands) |

=== 1925 ===
| 29 March 1925 International Friendly | Netherlands | 2–1 | Germany | Amsterdam, Netherlands |
| 14:30 (UTC+0:20) | de Haas 34'; Volkers 51' | Report | Voß 78' | Stadium: Altes Stadium; Attendance: 30,000; Referee: Félix Herren (Switzerland) |

| 21 June 1925 International Friendly | Sweden | 1–0 | Germany | Stockholm, Sweden |
| 14:00 (UTC+1:00) | Johansson 9' | Report | | Stadium: Olympic Stadium; Attendance: 10,000; Referee: Lauritz Andersen (Denmark) |

| 26 June 1925 International Friendly | Finland | 3–5 | Germany | Helsinki, Finland |
| 19:00 (UTC+2:00) | Kelin 28'; Koponen 50' (pen.), 83' | Report | Pömpner 52', 71', 79'; Ruch 75' (pen.); Voß 87' | Stadium: Töölön Pallokenttä; Attendance: 3,500; Referee: Sigfrid Benzer (Sweden) |

| 25 October 1925 International Friendly | Switzerland | 0–4 | Germany | Basel, Switzerland |
| 14:45 (UTC+1:00) | | Report | Harder 7', 42', 52'; Hochgesang 74' | Stadium: Rankhof; Attendance: 15,000; Referee: Eugen Braun (Austria) |

=== 1926 ===
| 18 April 1926 International Friendly | Germany | 4–2 | Netherlands | Düsseldorf, Germany |
| 16:00 (UTC+1:00) | Pöttinger 17', 43', 85'; Harder 79' | Report | Tap 20'; Kuchlin 71' | Stadium: Rheinstadion; Attendance: 60,000; Referee: Lauritz Andersen (Denmark) |

| 20 June 1926 International Friendly | Germany | 3–3 | Sweden | Nuremberg, Germany |
| 16:00 (UTC+1:00) | Harder 21', 35', 43' | Report | Hallbäck 26', 82'; Olsson 34' | Stadium: Zabo; Attendance: 10,000; Referee: Lauritz Andersen (Denmark) |

| 31 October 1926 International Friendly | Netherlands | 2–3 | Germany | Amsterdam, Netherlands |
| 14:00 (UTC+0:20) | Tap 16', 89' | Report | Wieder 32'; Harder 43'; Verlegh 85' (o.g.) | Stadium: Altes Stadium; Attendance: 30,000; Referee: Albert Prince-Cox (England) |
Note: First match under Otto Nerz.

| 12 December 1926 International Friendly | Germany | 2–3 | Switzerland | Munich, Germany |
| 14:00 (UTC+1:00) | Hochgesang 44'; Scherm 50' | Report | Brand 7'; Weiler 15'; Fink 83' | Stadium: Sechzgerstadion; Attendance: 40,000; Referee: Job Mutters (Netherlands) |

=== 1927 ===
| 2 October 1927 International Friendly | Denmark | 3–1 | Germany | Copenhagen, Denmark |
| 13:30 (UTC+1:00) | Rohde 23', 48'; Hansen 67' | Report | Kießling 10' | Stadium: Idrætspark; Attendance: 19,000; Referee: Ragnvald Smedvik (Norway) |

| 23 October 1927 International Friendly | Germany | 6–2 | Norway | Hamburg, Germany |
| 15:00 (UTC+1:00) | Hochgesang 55'; Pöttinger 67', 69', 88'; Kalb 73'; Hofmann 82' | Report | Dahl 3'; Gundersen 24' | Stadium: Altonaer Stadion; Attendance: 30,000; Referee: Lauritz Andersen (Denmark) |

| 20 November 1927 International Friendly | Germany | 2–2 | Netherlands | Köln, Germany |
| 14:00 (UTC+1:00) | Pöttinger 46', 70' | Report | Weber 38'; Smeets 82' | Stadium: Müngersdorfer Stadion; Attendance: 60,000; Referee: Albert Prince-Cox (England) |

=== 1928 ===
| 15 April 1928 International Friendly | Switzerland | 2–3 | Germany | Bern, Switzerland |
| 15:00 (UTC+1:00) | Jäggi 78', 81' | Report | Hofmann 18'; Pöttinger 47'; Albrecht 61' | Stadium: Neufeld; Attendance: 16,000; Referee: Stanley Rous (England) |

| 28 May 1928 1928 Olympic Games first Round | Germany | 4–0 | Switzerland | Amsterdam, Netherlands |
| 14:00 (UTC+1:20) | Hofmann 17', 75', 85'; Hornauer 42' | Report | | Stadium: Olympic Stadium; Attendance: 16,158; Referee: Willem Eymers (Netherlands) |

| 3 June 1928 1928 Olympic Games Quarter final | Uruguay | 4–1 | Germany | Amsterdam, |
| 16:00 (UTC+1:20) | Petrone 35', 39', 84'; Castro 63' | Report | Hofmann 81' | Stadium: Olympic Stadium; Attendance: 25,131; Referee: Youssuf Mohamed (Egypt) |
Note: First match against Uruguay; first match against a non-European team. Also, Hans Kalb and Richárd Hoffmann become the first players to be sent off.

| 16 September 1928 International Friendly | Germany | 2–1 | Denmark | Nuremberg, Germany |
| 15:30 (UTC+1:00) | Heidkamp 58'; Hofmann 68' | Report | Jørgensen 9' | Stadium: Städtisches Stadion; Attendance: 50,000; Referee: Paul Ruoff (Switzerland) |

| 23 September 1928 International Friendly | Norway | 0–2 | Germany | Oslo, Norway |
| 13:00 (UTC+1:00) | | Report | Schmitt 17'; Kuzorra 62' | Stadium: Ullevaal Stadion; Attendance: 16,400; Referee: Lauritz Andersen (Denmark) |

| 30 September 1928 International Friendly | Sweden | 2–0 | Germany | Stockholm, Sweden |
| 13:00 (UTC+1:00) | Lundahl 44' (pen.); Olsson 89' | Report | | Stadium: Olympic Stadium; Attendance: 20,000; Referee: Sophus Hansen (Denmark) |

=== 1929 ===
| 10 February 1929 International Friendly | Germany | 7–1 | Switzerland | Mannheim, Germany |
| 15:00 (UTC+1:00) | Frank 8', 45', 61', 72'; Sobek 23', 83'; Pöttinger 57' | Report | Abegglen 74' | Stadium: Carl-Benz-Stadion; Attendance: 30,000; Referee: Lauritz Andersen (Denmark) |

| 28 April 1929 International Friendly | Italy | 1–2 | Germany | Turin, Italy |
| 15:30 (UTC+1:00) | Rossetti 6' | Report | Hornauer 12'; Frank 80' | Stadium: Stadio Filadelfia; Attendance: 30,000; Referee: Harry Ernest Gray (England) |
Note: First broadcast of a Germany match.

| 1 June 1929 International Friendly | Germany | 1–1 | Scotland | Berlin, Germany |
| 18:00 (UTC+1:00) | Ruch 49'} | Report | Imrie 87' | Stadium: Deutsches Stadion; Attendance: 40,000; Referee: Otto Ohlsson (Sweden) |
Note: First match against Scotland.

| 23 June 1929 International Friendly | Germany | 3–0 | Denmark | Köln, Germany |
| 17:00 (UTC+1:00) | Hofmann 27', 65', 85' | Report | | Stadium: Müngersdorfer Stadion; Attendance: 52,000; Referee: Eugen Braun (Austria) |

| 20 October 1929 International Friendly | Germany | 4–0 | Finland | Altona, Germany |
| 15:00 (UTC+1:00) | Szepan 52'; Sackenheim 61', 81'; Hofmann 70' | Report | | Stadium: Altonaer Stadion; Attendance: 20,000; Referee: Bjarne Bech (Norway) |

== See also ==
- Germany national football team results (1930–1942)
- West Germany national football team results (1950–1990)
- East Germany national football team results (1952–1990)
- Germany national football team results (1990–1999)
- Germany national football team results (2000–2019)
- Germany national football team results (2020–present)
