= List of Germany national football team hat-tricks =

This is a list of hat-tricks scored in matches involving the Germany national football team.

== Hat-tricks for Germany and West Germany ==
Result
Lost the match
Drew the match

Date	Goals	Player	Opponent	Venue	Competition	Result	Ref
18 June 1911	3	Otto Dumke	Sweden	Råsunda Idrottsplats, Solna	Friendly	4–2	
24 March 1912	4	Julius Hirsch	Netherlands	Z.A.C. Stadium, Zwolle	Friendly	5–5	
1 July 1912	10	Gottfried Fuchs	Russia	Råsunda Idrottsplats, Solna	1912 Summer Olympics	16–0	
1 July 1912	4	Fritz Förderer	Russia	Råsunda Idrottsplats, Solna	1912 Summer Olympics	16–0	
13 January 1924	3	Andreas Franz	Austria	Club-Stadion im Zabo, Nuremberg	Friendly	4–3	
26 June 1925	3	Paul Pömpner	Finland	Töölön Pallokenttä, Helsinki	Friendly	5–3	
25 October 1925	3	Otto Harder	Switzerland	Stadion Rankhof, Basle	Friendly	4–0	
18 April 1926	3	Josef Pöttinger	Netherlands	Rheinstadion, Düsseldorf	Friendly	4–2	
20 June 1926	3	Otto Harder	Sweden	Club-Stadion im Zabo, Nuremberg	Friendly	3–3	
28 May 1928	3	Richard Hofmann	Switzerland	Olympic Stadium, Amsterdam	1928 Summer Olympics	4–0	
10 February 1929	4	Georg Frank	Switzerland	Rhein-Neckar Stadium, Mannheim	Friendly	7–1	
23 June 1929	3	Richard Hofmann	Sweden	Müngersdorfer Stadion, Cologne	Friendly	3–0	
10 May 1930	3	Richard Hofmann	England	Deutsches Stadion, Berlin	Friendly	3–3	
27 September 1931	3	Richard Hofmann	Denmark	Eilenriedestadion, Hanover	Friendly	4–2	
1 July 1932	3	Richard Hofmann	Finland	Töölön Pallokenttä, Helsinki	Friendly	4–1	
22 October 1933	3	Karl Hohmann	Belgium	Schauinsland-Reisen-Arena, Duisburg	Friendly	8–1	
11 March 1934	3	Karl Hohmann	Luxembourg	Stade Josy Barthel, Luxembourg City	1934 FIFA World Cup qualification	9–1	
11 March 1934	4	Josef Rasselnberg	Luxembourg	Stade Josy Barthel, Luxembourg City	1934 FIFA World Cup qualification	9–1	
27 May 1934	3	Edmund Conen	Belgium	Stadio Artemio Franchi, Florence	1934 FIFA World Cup	5–2	
7 October 1934	3	Josef Fath	Denmark	Idrætsparken, Copenhagen	Friendly	5–2	
27 January 1935	3	Edmund Conen	Switzerland	Adolf-Hitler-Kampfbahn, Stuttgart	Friendly	4–0	
18 August 1935	3	Ernst Lehner	Finland	Grünwalder Stadion, Munich	Friendly	6–0	
18 August 1935	3	Edmund Conen	Finland	Grünwalder Stadion, Munich	Friendly	6–0	
4 August 1936	3	Wilhelm Simetsreiter	Luxembourg	Poststadion, Berlin	1936 Summer Olympics	9–0	
4 August 1936	3	Adolf Urban	Luxembourg	Poststadion, Berlin	1936 Summer Olympics	9–0	
27 September 1936	3	Ernst Poertgen	Luxembourg	Grotenburg-Stadion, Krefeld	Friendly	7–2	
16 May 1937	5	Otto Siffling	Denmark	Olympic Stadium, Breslau	Friendly	8–0	
24 October 1937	3	Otto Siffling	Norway	Olympic Stadium, Berlin	Friendly	3–0	
18 September 1938	3	Josef Gauchel	Poland	Sportforum Chemnitz, Chemnitz	Friendly	4–1	
15 October 1939	3	Helmut Schön	(Socialist Federal Republic of Yugoslavia) Yugoslavia	Stadion Kranjčevićeva, Zagreb	Friendly	5–1	
12 November 1939	3	Franz Binder	Bohemia	Olympic Stadium, Breslau	Friendly	4–4	
26 November 1939	3	Franz Binder	Italy	Olympic Stadium, Berlin	Friendly	5–2	
14 July 1940	3	Fritz Walter	Romania	Waldstadion, Frankfurt	Friendly	9–3	
1 September 1940	6	Wilhelm Hahnemann	Finland	Bruno-Plache-Stadion, Leipzig	Friendly	13–0	
1 September 1940	4	Edmund Conen	Finland	Bruno-Plache-Stadion, Leipzig	Friendly	13–0	
20 October 1940	4	Edmund Conen	Bulgaria	Grünwalder Stadion, Munich	Friendly	9–3	
5 October 1941	3	Hermann Eppenhoff	Finland	Olympic Stadium, Helsinki	Friendly	6–0	
5 October 1941	3	Ernst Wilimowski	Finland	Olympic Stadium, Helsinki	Friendly	6–0	
16 August 1942	3	Fritz Walter	Romania	Beuthener Stadium, Bytom	Friendly	7–0	
18 October 1942	4	Ernst Wilimowski	Switzerland	Wankdorf Stadium, Berne	Friendly	5–3	
22 November 1942	3	August Klingler	Slovakia	Tehelné pole, Bratislava	Friendly	5–2	
23 June 1954	3	Max Morlock	Turkey	Hardturm, Zürich	1954 FIFA World Cup	7–2	
21 October 1959	3	Uwe Seeler	Netherlands	Müngersdorfer Stadion, Cologne	Friendly	7–0	
20 September 1961	3	Uwe Seeler	Denmark	Rheinstadion, Düsseldorf	Friendly	5–1	
28 September 1963	3	Uwe Seeler	Turkey	Waldstadion, Frankfurt	Friendly	3–0	
9 October 1965	3	Lothar Ulsaß	Austria	Neckarstadion, Stuttgart	Friendly	4–1	
8 April 1967	4	Gerd Müller	Albania	Stadion Rote Erde, Dortmund	UEFA Euro 1968 qualifying	6–0	
21 May 1969	4	Gerd Müller	Cyprus	Georg-Melches-Stadion, Essen	1970 FIFA World Cup qualification	12–0	
21 May 1969	3	Wolfgang Overath	Cyprus	Georg-Melches-Stadion, Essen	1970 FIFA World Cup qualification	12–0	
7 June 1970	3	Gerd Müller	Bulgaria	Estadio León, León	1970 FIFA World Cup	5–2	
10 June 1970	3	Gerd Müller	Peru	Estadio León, León	1970 FIFA World Cup	3–1	
22 June 1971	3	Gerd Müller	Norway	Ullevaal Stadion, Oslo	Friendly	7–1	
8 September 1971	3	Gerd Müller	Mexico	Niedersachsenstadion, Hanover	Friendly	5–0	
26 May 1972	4	Gerd Müller	Soviet Union	Olympic Stadium, Munich	Friendly	4–1	
15 November 1972	4	Gerd Müller	Switzerland	Rheinstadion, Düsseldorf	Friendly	5–1	
15 June 1976	3	Dieter Müller	(Socialist Federal Republic of Yugoslavia) Yugoslavia	Red Star Stadium, Belgrade	UEFA Euro 1976	4–2	
14 June 1980	3	Klaus Allofs	Netherlands	Stadio San Paolo, Naples	UEFA Euro 1980	3–2	
23 September 1981	3	Karl-Heinz Rummenigge	Finland	Ruhrstadion, Bochum	1982 FIFA World Cup qualification	7–1	
18 November 1981	3	Karl-Heinz Rummenigge	Albania	Westfalenstadion, Dortmund	1982 FIFA World Cup qualification	8–0	
20 June 1982	3	Karl-Heinz Rummenigge	Chile	El Molinón, Gijón	1982 FIFA World Cup	4–1	
2 April 1997	3	Ulf Kirsten	Albania	Estadio Nuevo Los Cármenes, Granada	1998 FIFA World Cup qualification	3–2	
20 August 1997	3	Oliver Bierhoff	Northern Ireland	Windsor Park, Belfast	1998 FIFA World Cup qualification	3–1	
4 June 1999	3	Oliver Bierhoff	Moldova	BayArena, Leverkusen	UEFA Euro 2000 qualifying	6–1	
8 September 1999	3	Christian Ziege	Northern Ireland	Westfalenstadion, Dortmund	UEFA Euro 2000 qualifying	4–0	
13 February 2002	3	Miroslav Klose	Israel	Fritz-Walter-Stadion, Kaiserslautern	Friendly	7–1	
9 May 2002	3	Oliver Bierhoff	Kuwait	Dreisamstadion, Freiburg	Friendly	7–0	
18 May 2002	3	Miroslav Klose	Austria	BayArena, Leverkusen	Friendly	6–2	
1 June 2002	3	Miroslav Klose	Saudi Arabia	Sapporo Dome, Sapporo	2002 FIFA World Cup	8–0	
27 May 2004	4	Michael Ballack	Malta	Dreisamstadion, Freiburg	Friendly	7–0	
18 August 2004	3	Kevin Kurányi	Austria	Ernst-Happel-Stadion, Vienna	Friendly	3–1	
7 September 2005	3	Lukas Podolski	South Africa	Weserstadion, Bremen	Friendly	4–2	
6 September 2006	4	Lukas Podolski	San Marino	Stadio Olimpico, Serravalle	UEFA Euro 2008 qualifying	13–0	
10 September 2008	3	Miroslav Klose	Finland	Olympic Stadium, Helsinki	2010 FIFA World Cup qualification	3–3	
2 June 2009	4	Mario Gómez	United Arab Emirates	Al-Maktoum Stadium, Dubai	Friendly	7–2	
15 October 2013	3	André Schürrle	Sweden	Friends Arena, Solna	2014 FIFA World Cup qualification	5–3	
16 June 2014	3	Thomas Müller	Portugal	Arena Fonte Nova, Salvador	2014 FIFA World Cup	4–0	
13 June 2015	3	André Schürrle	Gibraltar	Estádio Algarve, Faro/Loulé	UEFA Euro 2016 qualifying	7–0	
11 November 2016	3	Serge Gnabry	San Marino	Stadio Olimpico, Serravalle	2018 FIFA World Cup qualification	8–0	
10 June 2017	3	Sandro Wagner	San Marino	Stadion Nürnberg, Nuremberg	2018 FIFA World Cup qualification	7–0	
19 November 2019	3	Serge Gnabry	Northern Ireland	Waldstadion, Frankfurt	UEFA Euro 2020 qualifying	6–1	

== Hat-tricks conceded by Germany and West Germany ==
Date	Goals	Player	Opponent	Venue	Competition	Result	Ref(s)
14 April 1912	3	Sándor Bodnár	Hungary	Üllői úti, Budapest	Friendly	4–4	
3 July 1912	3	Imre Schlosser	Hungary	Råsunda Idrottsplats, Solna	1912 Olympic Games	1–3	
26 October 1913	4	Poul Nielsen	Denmark	Stadion Hoheluft, Hamburg	Friendly	1–4	
23 November 1913	3	Sylvain Brébart	Belgium	Stadion Broodstraat, Antwerp	Friendly	2–6	
23 November 1913	3	Jean Van Cant	Belgium	Stadion Broodstraat, Antwerp	Friendly	2–6	
26 September 1920	3	Ferdinand Swatosch	Austria	Sportplatz Simmering, Vienna	Friendly	2–3	
3 June 1928	3	Pedro Petrone	Uruguay	Olympic Stadium, Amsterdam	1928 Olympic Games	1–4	
7 September 1930	3	Pauli Jørgensen	Denmark	Idrætsparken, Copenhagen	Friendly	3–6	
28 September 1930	3	József Takács	Hungary	Heinz-Steyer-Stadion, Dresden	Friendly	5–3	
24 May 1931	3	Anton Schall	Austria	Deutsches Stadion, Berlin	Friendly	0–6	
13 September 1931	3	Matthias Sindelar	Austria	Praterstadion, Vienna	Friendly	0–5	
3 June 1934	3	Oldřich Nejedlý	Czechoslovakia	Stadio Nazionale PNF, Rome	1934 FIFA World Cup	1–3	
24 September 1939	3	Gyula Zsengellér	Hungary	Üllői úti, Budapest	Friendly	1–5	
12 November 1939	3	Josef Bican	Bohemia	Olympic Stadium, Breslau	Friendly	4–4	
5 October 1941	3	Henry Carlsson	Sweden	Råsunda Idrottsplats, Solna	Friendly	2–4	
20 June 1954	4	Sándor Kocsis	Hungary	St. Jakob Stadium, Basle	1954 FIFA World Cup	3–8	
28 June 1958	4	Just Fontaine	France	Ullevi, Gothenburg	1958 FIFA World Cup	3–6	
30 July 1966	3	Geoff Hurst	England	Wembley Stadium, London	1966 FIFA World Cup final	2–4	
20 June 2000	3	Sérgio Conceição	Portugal	De Kuip, Rotterdam	UEFA Euro 2000	0–3	
1 September 2001	3	Michael Owen	England	Olympic Stadium, Munich	2002 FIFA World Cup qualification	1–5	
26 May 2012	3	Eren Derdiyok	Switzerland	St. Jakob-Park, Basle	Friendly	3–5	
17 November 2020	3	Ferran Torres	Spain	La Cartuja, Seville	2020–21 UEFA Nations League	0–6	

== See also ==
- Germany national football team records and statistics
- Germany national football team results
