= Arthur Gaebelein =

German footballer

Personal information
- Date of birth: 29 March 1891
- Date of death: 4 September 1964 (aged 73)
- Position: Forward

Senior career*
Years	Team	Apps	(Gls)
- Hohenzollern Halle

International career
1912	Germany	1	(0)
- * Club domestic league appearances and goals

Otto Arthur Alfred Gaebelein (29 March 1891 – 28 August 1964) was a German international footballer. In 1912, he played for the Germany national football team. In his club career, he was initially a striker and later a defender.

== Career ==
Gaebelein played from 1901 to 1930 for Halleschen FC Hohenzollern (renamed Hallescher SV 1898 in 1918, then known after 1945 as BSG Unit Mitte Halle), of which he remained a member until his death in 1964. During these years he also played for Viktoria 1896 Magdeburg during the First World War from 1914 to 1917. With Viktoria, in the position of attacker he won the Middle Elbe championship twice in 1916 and 1917. With Hallescher SV 1898 the Saale championship was added in 1921/22.

The “excellent combination player” had a long and successful career in the Central Germany association team. He made his debut in the competition for the Crown Prince Cup on October 9, 1910 in the game in Leipzig against Northern Germany alongside Camillo Ugi on the left wing. In the 1912/13 competition, his appearance on October 13, 1912 in Fürth in the game against a strong team from southern Germany with Max Breunig, Hermann Bosch, Fritz Förderer, Julius Hirsch, Eugen Kipp and Karl Wegele brought him into the national team squad. He played his only international match on November 17, 1912 in Leipzig as a left winger against the Netherlands. Germany lost 2:3. In attack, the DFB team lined up with Wegele, Förderer, Adolf Jäger, Kipp and Gaebelein. After that, Gaebelein was not called up to the national team again.

A year later, on November 9, 1913, he won (2:1) with Central Germany the semi-final game for the Crown Prince Cup in Nuremberg against Southern Germany. In the final on February 22, 1914 in Berlin, with teammates such as goalkeeper Johannes Schneider and the outfield players Willy Völker, Ernst Rokosch, Paul Pömpner and Eduard Pendorf, he lost by 1-2 against Northern Germany, in whose ranks the offensive players Adolf Jäger, Otto Harder, Richard Queck and Ernst Möller stood out. On May 29, 1919, he scored the consolation goal for the hosts in the semi-final game in Leipzig against Southern Germany in the Federal Cup in a 3-1 defeat against Southern Germany.

Gaebelein experienced his second final appearance on June 20, 1920 in Hanover in the game against West Germany; but also his second defeat with a score of 0-1 after extra time. When the representation of Central Germany secured the Federal Cup in the final with a clear 4-0 win against West Germany in Leipzig on March 20, 1921, left winger Richard Kühn from SpVgg Leipzig stormed on. However, Gaebelein had also participated in the VMBV's attack alongside Förderer and Pömpner in the victorious semi-final on November 14, 1920 in Dresden against Brandenburg (2:1).

In total he played 35 representative games for the Association of Central German Ball Game Clubs, including 16 appearances with three goals from 1910 to 1922 in the Crown Prince Cup, Federal Cup and Kampfspielcup games. He was awarded the association's Silver Badge of Honor.

== Teams ==
1901 to 1914: Hallescher FC Hohenzollern 1914 to 1917: Viktoria 1896 Magdeburg 1917 to 1930: SV Halle 98
