= 1927 in Norwegian football =

Football in Norway
Men's football
- NM: Ørn

Results from Norwegian football in 1927.

== Class A of local association leagues ==
Class A of local association leagues (kretsserier) is the predecessor of a national league competition.

League	Champion
Østfold	Sarpsborg
Oslo	Vålerengen
Follo	Ski
Aker	Bygdø
Lillestrøm og omegn	Lillestrøm SK
Øvre Romerike	Sørumsand
Eidsvoll og omegn	Eidsvold IF
Hamar og omegn^{1}	Hamar IL
Opland^{1}	Raufoss
Glommendalen	Kirkenær
Nordre Østerdalen^{2}	Bergmann
Trysil og Engerdal	Nybergsund
Røyken og Hurum	Spikkestad
Øvre Buskerud	Kongsberg
Drammen og omegn	Strømsgodset
Vestfold	Fram (Larvik)
Grenland	Odd
Øvre Telemark	Ulefoss
Aust-Agder	Kragerø
Vest-Agder	Flekkefjord
Rogaland	Stavanger IF
Hordaland	Voss
Bergen	Brann
Sogn og Fjordane	Florø
Søndmøre	Aalesund
Romsdalske	Kristiansund
Sør-Trøndelag	Ranheim
Trondhjem	Brage
Nord-Trøndelag	Neset
Namdal	Namsos
Helgeland	Mo
Lofoten og Vesterålen	Narvik/Nor
Troms	Tromsø Turn
Finnmark	Kirkenes

- ^{1}In the following season, local associations Hamar og omegn and Opland merged to form Oplandene.
- ^{2}In the following season, Nordre Østerdalen local association changed name to Nord-Østerdal.

== Norwegian Cup ==
=== Final ===
16 October 1927

Ørn	4–0	Drafn
Dahl 16', 43', 80'; Jacobsen 55'	Report

Sandefjord Stadion, Sandefjord
Attendance: 9,000
Referee: Fritz Lütcherat (Hasle)

== National team ==
29 May Friendly; NFF's 25th Anniversary Match	Norway	0–1	Denmark	Oslo, Norway
13:00 (UTC+1); Match 67		Report	Uldaler 87'	Stadium: Ullevaal Stadion; Attendance: 15,000; Referee: Axel Bergqvist (Sweden)

15 June Friendly	Norway	3–1	Finland	Oslo, Norway
19:30 (UTC+1); Match 68	Møller 24'; Strøm 47'; Berstad 63'	Report	Åström 54'	Stadium: Ullevaal Stadion; Attendance: 16,000; Referee: Arthur Björklund (Sweden)

26 June 1924–28 Nordic Championship	Norway	3–5	Sweden	Oslo, Norway
13:00 (UTC+1); Match 69	Berstad 5', 80'; Gundersen 89'	Report	Rydell 18', 23', 65'; Olsson 38', 68'	Stadium: Gressbanen; Attendance: 10,000; Referee: Otto Remke (Denmark)

23 October Friendly	Germany	6–2	Norway	Altona, Germany
15:00 (UTC+1); Match 70	Hochgesang 55', 88'; Pöttinger 67', 69'; Kalb 73'; Hofmann 82'	Report	Dahl 3'; Gundersen 24'	Stadium: Altonaer Stadion; Attendance: 30,000; Referee: Lauritz Andersen (Denmark)

30 October 1924–28 Nordic Championship	Denmark	3–1	Norway	Copenhagen, Denmark
13:30 (UTC+1); Match 71	Jørgensen 48'; Rohde 58'; Hansen 69'	Report	Gundersen 19'	Stadium: Københavns Idrætspark; Attendance: 20,000; Referee: Alfred Birlem (Germany)
