= Zwieteren =

Zwieteren is a Dutch surname. Notable people with the surname include:

- Theo van Zwieteren (1887–1962), Dutch football referee
- Willy van Zwieteren (1904–1983), Dutch footballer and brother of the above
- Dorothea Margaretha van Zwieteren (1926–2010), Dutch singer and television presenter
