= 1927 Norwegian Football Cup =

Norgesmesterskapet i fotball for menn 1927

Tournament details
- Country: Norway
- Teams: 117

Final positions
- Champions: Ørn (2nd title)
- Runners-up: Drafn

The 1927 Norwegian Football Cup was the 26th season of the Norwegian annual knockout football tournament. The tournament was open for all members of NFF, except those from Northern Norway. Last years losing finalist Ørn won 4–0 against Drafn in the final, and won their second title. Odd were the defending champions, but were eliminated by Drafn in the quarterfinal. The final was the first and only final that was played in Sandefjord.

== First round ==
Team 1	Score	Team 2
Bergmann	2–1 (Note: Played at Tynset.)	Trysil
Brage	9–2	Braatt
Bøn	1–2 (a.e.t.)	Lyn (Gjøvik)
Dokken	0–4	Vaalerengen
Drammens BK	9–2	Eiker
Drøbak IF	0–8	Lyn
Ekeberg	5–3 (a.e.t.)	Ready
Elverum	3–4	Kirkenær
Falk	2–1 (Note: Falk was disqualified for the unknown reasons.)	Lisleby
Flekkefjord	0–10	Viking
Fram (Brumunddal)	2–2 (a.e.t.)	B.14
Frigg	6–2	Bygdø
Gjeithus	3–1	Jevnaker
Hamar	5–0	Kapp
Hardy	3–2 (a.e.t.)	Minde
Jessheim	1–2	Eidsvold
Kampørn	3–2	Roy
Kongsvinger	4–0	Sørumsand
Kragerø	1–7	Larvik Turn
Kristiansund	0–4	Aalesund
Kraakstad	1–9	Fredrikstad
Kvik (Hadeland)	2–7	Mjøndalen
Lillestrøm-Kameratene	7–2	Nordstrand
Moss	9–0	Tønsberg Turn
Namsos	4–0	Verdal
Nesset	4–2 (Note: Played at Stjørdal.)	Freidig
Norrøna	1–2	Gjøa
Nybergsund	3–1	Trysilgutten
Ranheim	1–0	Kvik (Trondhjem)
Rapp	5–2	Strinda
Raufoss	3–0	Fremad
Rjukan	1–3	Tell
Rollon	3–0	Hødd
Selbak	6–0	Hasle
Ski	0–7	Sarpsborg
Skotfos	4–2 (Note: Played in Kristiansand.)	Grane
Snøgg	2–8	Kongsberg
Spikkestad	1–5	Trygg
Solbergelven	2–0	Liv
Stabæk	5–2	Skiold
Start	4–0	Mandalskameratene
Stenkjær	2–1	National
Stord	1–4	Djerv
Storm	2–1 (Note: Played in Larvik.)	Agnæs
Strømsgodset	10–0	Graabein
Sverre	8–1 (Note: Played in Levanger.)	Harran
Tønsberg-Kameratene	4–1	Pors
Ulefos	2–3	Sandefjord
*Ulf (Sandnes)	4–1	Egersund
Vard	2–3	Brodd
Vennesla	1–2	Donn
Vikersund	1–6	Holmestrand
Voss	2–4	Brann
Østsiden FK	4–2	Lillestrøm
Årstad	4–3	Draug
Fram (Larvik)	Bye	
Hof	Bye	
Kvik (Fredrikshald)	Bye	
Odd	Bye	
Stavanger	Bye	
Urædd	Bye	
Ørn	Bye	
Replay
B.14	4–0	Fram (Brumunddal)

== Second round ==
Team 1	Score	Team 2
Bergmann	2–6	Brage
Brann	3–1	Kampørn
Djerv	3–2	Årstad
Donn	2–0	Tønsberg-Kameratene
Drafn	7–3	Østsiden FK
Eidsvold	1–2	Lyn
Ekeberg	1–5	Moss
Fredrikstad	9–0	Solbergelven
Gjeithus	1–5	Frigg
Gjøa	2–1	B.14
Kirkenær	3–2	Hoff
Kongsberg	3–9	Strømsgodset
Kongsvinger	2–0	Lillestrøm-Kameratene
Larvik Turn	3–1	Stabæk
Lisleby	1–2	Ørn
Lyn (Gjøvik)	2–3	Rollon
Nybergsund	0–8	Hamar
Ranheim	3–4	Nesset
Rapp	4–1	Sverre
Raufoss	4–5 (a.e.t.)	Kvik (Fredrikshald)
Sandefjord	0–3	Odd
Sarpsborg	abd.	Holmestrand
Stavanger IF	5–1	Brodd
Stenkjær	2–1	Namsos
Storm	4–1	Fram (Larvik)
Tell	2–5	Skotfos
Trygg	2–3	Drammens BK
Ulf (Sandnes)	0–3	Viking
Urædd	6–2	Start
Vaalerengen	2–3	Selbak
Aalesund	8–1	Hardy
Mjøndalen	Bye	
Replay
Sarpsborg	3–0	Holmestrand

== Third round ==
Team 1	Score	Team 2
Brage	1–2	Gjøa
Djerv	3–5	Stavanger IF
Drammens BK	3–4	Brann
Frigg	8–2	Nesset
Hamar	0–1	Urædd
Kvik (Fredrikshald)	11–0	Kongsvinger
Larvik Turn	4–1 (a.e.t.)	Moss
Lyn	0–3	Storm
Odd	5–1	Mjøndalen
Rapp	8–1	Stenkjær
Selbak	2–1 (a.e.t.)	Fredrikstad
Skotfos	0–2	Drafn
Strømsgodset	2–1	Sarpsborg
Viking	15–0	Donn
Ørn	10–0	Kirkenær
Aalesund	2–1	Rollon

== Fourth round ==
Team 1	Score	Team 2
Brann	2–0	Selbak
Drafn	4–4 (abd.)	Frigg
Gjøa	3–1	Viking
Larvik Turn	6–1	Rapp
Stavanger IF	1–8	Ørn
Storm	1–4	Strømsgodset
Urædd	1–6	Kvik (Fredrikshald)
Aalesund	0–1	Odd
Replay
Frigg	1–3	Drafn

== Quarter-finals ==
Team 1	Score	Team 2
25 September 1927
Kvik (Fredrikshald)	5–2	Gjøa
Odd	1–3	Drafn
Strømsgodset	3–4 (a.e.t.)	Larvik Turn
Ørn	2–1 (Note: Played in Oslo.)	Brann

== Semi-finals ==
Team 1	Score	Team 2
2 October 1927
Drafn	5–0 (a.e.t.) (Note: Played in Fredrikstad.)	Kvik (Fredrikshald)
Ørn	5–0 (Note: Played at Ullevaal Stadion in Oslo.)	Larvik Turn

== Final ==
16 October 1927

Ørn	4–0	Drafn
Dahl 16', 43', 80'; Jacobsen 55'	Report

Sandefjord Stadion, Sandefjord
Attendance: 9,000
Referee: Fritz Lütcherat (Hasle)

== See also ==
- 1927 in Norwegian football
