= Walter Hempel =

Walter Hempel may refer to:

- Walter Hempel (footballer)
- Walter Hempel (coach)
