= Gaebelein =

Gaebelein may refer to:

- Arno C. Gaebelein (1861–1945), early dispensationalist leader and contributing author to The Fundamentals
- Arthur Gaebelein (1891–1964), German international footballer
- Frank E. Gaebelein (1899–1983), founder of the Stony Brook School and editor of the Expositor's Bible Commentary
