= Eugen Kipp =

German footballer

Personal information
- Date of birth: 26 February 1885
- Place of birth: Stuttgart, Germany
- Date of death: 4 November 1931 (aged 46)
- Place of death: Stuttgart, Germany
- Position: Forward

Senior career*
Years	Team	Apps	(Gls)
1901–1905	FC Karlsvorstadt		
1905–1912	Sportfreunde Stuttgart		
1912–1915	Stuttgarter Kickers		

International career
1908–1913	Germany	18	(10)
- * Club domestic league appearances and goals

Eugen Kipp (26 February 1885 – 4 November 1931) was a German footballer who played as a forward. Eugen was a member of the German Olympic squad and played one match in the main tournament.

== Biography ==
On 5 April 1908, Kipp was one of the eleven footballers who played in the debut game of the Germany national team, in a friendly against Switzerland that ended in a 3-5 loss. After that, he became his country's all-time top scorer in international football, with 10 goals in 18 caps (two of which as captain) between 1908 and 1913, until eventually being overtaken by several of his contemporaries. He scored his first and last international goal in the two games in which he was captain, and both ended in losses to Austria and Switzerland. He only scored more than once in a single international game once, in a 3–2 win over Switzerland on 3 April 1910. He also represented Germany at the 1912 Summer Olympics, playing just one game.

At club level, he spent his best years with Sportfreunde Stuttgart between 1905 and 1912, playing a pivotal role in helping the club win the 1910 Kronprinzenpokal in 1910. The highlight of his club career was representing Sportfreunde in the 1909 Sir Thomas Lipton Trophy, regarded by many as the first European club trophy. He scored his team's only goal at the tournament in a 1–2 loss to a Torino XI (a team formed from players of Juventus and Torino).

== Personal life ==
Kipp served in World War I, and was severely injured in Ypres, Belgium. He lost his right leg right above his knee, and received bayonet slashes to his jaw and shoulder. He never fully recovered from the injuries, and died on 4 November 1931 at the age of 46.

While he was still alive, he was the only football player besides Adolf Jäger to be honored with the eagle plaque, the highest award in German sport at the time, by the Reich Committee for Physical Education.

== International goals ==
Switzerland score listed first, score column indicates score after each Kipp goal.

List of international goals scored by Eugen Kipp
No.	Cap	Date	Venue	Opponent	Score	Result	Competition
1	2	7 June 1908	Cricketer-Platz, Vienna, Austria	Austria	1–0	2–3	Friendly
2	3	4 April 1909	KFV Telegrafenkaserne ground, Karlsruhe, Germany	Switzerland	1–0	1–0	Friendly
3	4	3 April 1910	Landhof, Basel, Switzerland	Switzerland	2–1	3–2	Friendly
4	4	3 April 1910	Landhof, Basel, Switzerland	Switzerland	3–2	3–2	Friendly
5	5	24 April 1910	Klarenbeek Stadium, Arnhem, Netherlands	Netherlands	1–0	2–4	Friendly
6	6	26 March 1911	Gazi-Stadion auf der Waldau, Stuttgart, Germany	Switzerland	3–1	6–2	Friendly
7	8	18 June 1911	Råsunda IP, Solna, Sweden	Sweden	3–2	4–2	Friendly
8	10	14 April 1912	Millenáris Sporttelep, Budapest, Hungary	Hungary	2–1	4–4	Friendly
9	11	5 May 1912	Espenmoos, St. Gallen, Switzerland	Switzerland	1–0	2–1	Friendly
10	16	18 May 1913	FFC-Platz Schwarzwaldstraße, Freiburg, Germany	Switzerland	1–2	1–2	Friendly
