= Ernst Jordan =

German footballer

Personal information
- Date of birth: 18 May 1883
- Place of birth: Germany
- Date of death: 1948 (aged 64–65)
- Position: Defender

Senior career*
Years	Team	Apps	(Gls)
- Cricket Viktoria Magdeburg

International career
1908	Germany	1	(0)
- * Club domestic league appearances and goals

Ernst Jordan (18 May 1883 – 1948) was a German football defender who played for Cricket Viktoria Magdeburg. He was also called "Langmeier" because he was quite tall (German: „lang").

Jordan represented Germany in the team's first ever international match against Switzerland in 1908. Germany was going to play with the two defenders Walter Hempel and Heinrich Riso, but Riso was injured, and Jordan was chosen to play left back as his replacement. He scored an own-goal, the first own-goal scored against Germany, which gave Switzerland a 2–1 lead, and Switzerland won the match 5–3.

From 1910 to 1914, he won the Gaumeisterschaft Mittelelbe as a team member of Cricket Viktoria Magdeburg five times running.

Jordan was a painter.
