= Cricket Viktoria Magdeburg =

German football club

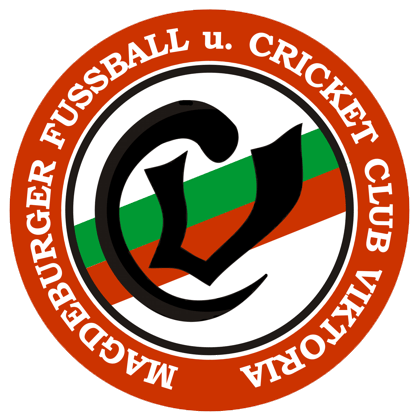
- Full name: Magdeburger Fussball und Cricket; Club Viktoria 1897
- Nicknames: Cricketer, Kricketer
- Founded: 16 June 1897
- Ground: Cricketer Sportpark (1922–1936)
- Capacity: 40,000
- League: Verband Mitteldeutscher; Ballspielvereine
Home colours	Away colours

Cricket Viktoria Magdeburg was a German association football club playing in the Cracau district of Magdeburg, Saxony-Anhalt.

== History ==
The club was established in 1897 out of the merger of FuCC Regatta Magdeburg und FC Gut Stoss Magdeburg and was originally a cricket team, one of the English sports alongside football and rugby becoming popular in continental Europe at the time. Interest in football grew quickly and in 1900 Cricket Viktoria, along with local rival SV Viktoria 96 Magdeburg, became founding members of the German Football Association (Deutscher Fussball Bund or German Football Association).

Cricket Viktoria never developed any sort of national presence in the period leading up to World War II. CV played in the Gau Mittelelbe, a league of the Verband Mitteldeutscher Ballspielvereine (VMBV) where they won several regional titles in the 1910s and 20s, but were unable to advance out of league play and on to the Germany national team playoff rounds. In 1921 the football department of MTV 1848 Magdeburg joined the club.

German football was re-organized in 1933 under the Third Reich into sixteen top flight Gauligen. At the time Cricket Viktoria played in the second division Bezirksklasse Magdeburg-Anhalt and on the strength of a first-place finish there earned promotion to the Gauliga Mitte. They played at the top flight until a last place finish and relegation in 1942 after the club had been weakened by the draft of many its players into the army. The team's best results were second-place finishes in 1936 and 1938.

Like most organizations in Germany, including football and sports clubs, Cricket Viktoria was disbanded in 1945 by the Soviet Military Administration in Germany at the end of World War II. Late in the year the formation of new clubs was permitted and many former players joined SG (Sportgruppe) Magdeburg-Altstadt. Others, such as future star Ernst "Anti" Kümmel joined SG Sudenburg, which would soon become 1. FC Magdeburg.

Many clubs in what would become East Germany underwent several name changes. SG Magdeburg-Altstadt become BSG Grün-Rot Stadt Magdeburg in 1949 and then BSG Einheit Magdeburg in 1950. This team's football department left to join BSG Aufbau Börde Magdeburg in 1952. Börde is still active today as MSV Börde 1949.

On 6 June 2004 a new side calling itself Cricket 04 Magdeburg was established by the second-team footballers of WSG Cracau.

== Stadium ==
The club first played its matches in the Großer Cracauer Anger (1897–1912). They later moved to the Cricketer Sportpark, or Kricketerplatz, located in the district of Cracau in the eastern part of Magdeburg, near Jerichower Strasse and Herrenkrugstrasse, on property owned by the German military.

The opening match held there was a friendly against SpVgg Fürth on Sunday, 20 August 1922. The team from Fürth, one of the dominant sides of the time, beat Cricket Viktoria 8:0. In 1932 the stadium was modified and now had a capacity of 40,000. On 5 November 1933, the sold-out ground hosted the first match played by a Germany national team in Magdeburg. Germany drew 2–2 against Norway in front of 40,000 spectators.

In 1936, as part of the ongoing re-armament of the German military during the mid-1930s, the property was reclaimed by the army. The stadium was demolished and military barracks (Hindenburg Kaserne) were erected. After losing their ground, they moved to the Polizeistadion am Hasselbachplatz in the Altstadt district (1938–1952).

== Honours ==
- Gau Mittelelbe Champions: 1910, 1911, 1912, 1913, 1914, 1925, 1928, 1929
- Gau Mittelelbe Cupwinners: 1911, 1927
- Bezirksklasse Magdeburg Champions: 1934
- Gau VI Mitte Vice-Champions: 1936, 1938

== Notable players ==
Cricket Viktoria sent Ernst Jordan as a defender to the Germany national team in its first ever official international match on 5 April 1908. It was his first and only appearance for the side as he scored an own goal in a 3–5 defeat against Switzerland and his performance received poor reviews in the sports pages of the day.
