= SV Victoria 96 Magdeburg =

Association football club

SV Viktoria 96 Magdeburg
- Full name: Sportverein Viktoria 96 Magdeburg e.V.
- Founded: 15 June 1896
- Dissolved: 1937
- Ground: Stadion am Gübser Damm (1912–1938)
- League: Verband Mitteldeutscher Ballspiel-Vereine
Home colours	Away colours

Viktoria 96 Magdeburg was a German football club playing in the Cracau district of Magdeburg, Saxony-Anhalt.

== History ==
The club was founded under the name Victoria on 26 June 1896 by twelve ninth-graders of Magdeburg's Guericke-Realschule. Soon renamed Magdeburger Fußball-Club Viktoria von 1896, the club played association football exclusively by September 1897. This makes it the city's first football club.

On 12 September 1897, Schüler-Victoria (Students' Victoria), as the club was also called, played their first competitive association football match against the reserve team of Cricket Viktoria Magdeburg. The match ended in a clear 6–3 win for Victoria 96. Victoria 1896 became well known among the country's football pioneers and soon began to receive payments to make appearances against other clubs. Victoria was a member of the Ring Magdeburger Ballspielvereine, but this was soon replaced by the Verband Magdeburger Ballspielvereine (VMBV) that was founded in 1900. On 26 December 1900, MFC Victoria 1896 became a founding member of the Verband Mitteldeutscher Ballspielvereine. Alongside local rival Cricket Viktoria Magdeburg, the club was a founding member of the German Football Association (Deutscher Fussball Bund or German Football Association) at Leipzig in 1900. As champions of the VMBV in 1903 the club played in the final round of Germany's national championship, but went out 1–8 to Altonaer FC 1893 in the first round, in front of 200 spectators at the Exerzierweide Altona.

Victoria repeated their title in the Verband Magdeburger Ballspielvereine champions in 1904, losing 0–1 to VfB Leipzig in the quarterfinal of the German championship, due to an own goal by their keeper Kurt Stollberg. Victoria finished their last VMBV season with another title and advanced to the second round of the German championship through a walkover as opponents Schlesien Breslau withdrew due to the high cost of travel for their second-round match in Leipzig against Magdeburg. In 1905 the local Magdeburg league merged with the Verband Mitteldeutscher Ballspielvereine. The club played in the Gau Mittelelbe and continued their winning ways with six league titles between 1906 and 1917. Despite this record they were unable to make a return to the national stage.

The club grew rapidly at this time and by 1920 had 728 members. Several new sports were adopted with track-and-field and watersports being especially popular. In 1912 the name was changed from Magdeburger FC Victoria 1896 to Sportverein Viktoria 96 Magdeburg and a new logo was introduced. Over the next years the club produced a number of outstanding athletes who became well known as they won several national and international titles. The football team, however, became simply an average regional side.

In 1933 German football was re-organized under the Third Reich into sixteen new top-flight divisions known as Gauligas. Viktoria 96 qualified for play in the Gauliga Mitte where they played until a last place finish and bankruptcy in 1937 drove them out of first division football. The team merged with Männer-Turnverein 1860 Neustadt the following year to form VfL 1860 Viktoria Neustadt which was disbanded at the end of World War II in 1945. However, the club had a short revival in 2008, but was expelled from league play for failing to pay their fees during the 2008–09 season.

== Stadium ==
The home ground of the club was the Sportplatz am Gübser Damm, also known as Viktoriaplatz in the eastern part of Magdeburg. It was opened in 1912 in front of 1,500 spectators with a friendly match against Hertha BSC (0:9). The stadium hosted the German championship final on 31 May 1914 in a contest that saw SpVgg Fürth beat VfB Leipzig 3:2 in extra time.

After the bankruptcy of Viktoria 96 in 1937 the Allianz insurance company became the new owner of the stadium and the ground was renamed Allianz-Stadion. The stadium was totally destroyed in heavy bombardments by Allied air forces in 1944. Construction of a new stadium in almost at the same spot began in 1954 with the ground-breaking for the Ernst-Grube-Stadion, which would later become the home ground of 1. FC Magdeburg. In the opening match there, the B-squad of the East Germany national team defeated their Romanian counterparts 3:1.

== Notable players ==
- Paul Matthes, German international who played in the 1–5 loss to England on 20 April 1908 in Berlin; also refereed in four matches of the German championship between 1904 and 1910

== Honours ==
- Verband Magdeburger Ballspielvereine: 5
  - Winners: 1901, 1902, 1903, 1904, 1905
- Gau Mittelelbe Champions: 6
  - Winners: 1906, 1907, 1908, 1909, 1916, 1917
