= Walter Hempel (coach) =

American football, baseball and track and field coach

Biographical details
- Born: February 15, 1876; Dresden, Germany
- Died: June 17, 1949 (aged 73); Lake Tahoe, Nevada, U.S.

Coaching career (HC unless noted)

Football
- 1903: Pomona
- 1905: Sherman Institute (CA)
- 1907–1908: St. Vincent's (CA)

Baseball
- 1903: North Dakota

Track
- 1899: Knox (IL)
- 1901: Northwestern

Administrative career (AD unless noted)
- 1903: North Dakota
- 1906–1907: St. Vincent's (CA)

Walter Hempel (February 15, 1876 – June 17, 1949) was an American football, baseball and track and field coach. He served as the head football coach at Pomona College in 1903 and at St. Vincent's College in Los Angeles, California, from 1907 to 1908. Hempel later worked in real estate in Lake Tahoe, Nevada. He was killed there on June 17, 1949, in an apparent robbery-murder by 29-year-old Mark Donnelly, an ex-convict with prior convictions for robbery, burglary, and auto theft. Donnelly was briefly questioned in the murder of oilman W.A. Thornton. In November 1949, Donnelly was convicted of first degree murder and sentenced to life in prison after the jury recommended mercy. He was denied parole in 1958.
