= Herbert Willing =

Dutch football referee (1878–1943)

Bep Willing
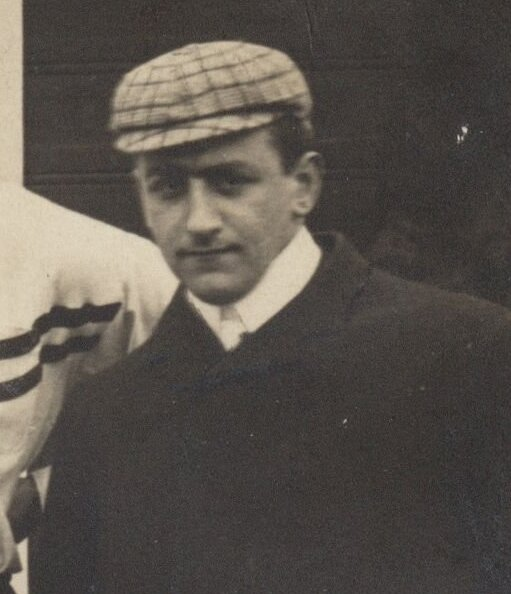
- Willing in 1905
- Full name: Herbert James Willing
- Born: 16 August 1878; Rotterdam, Netherlands
- Died: 15 September 1943 (aged 65); Rotterdam, Netherlands
Years		Role
1900–?		Referee

International
Years	League	Role
1906–1914	UEFA	Referee

Herbert James "Bep" Willing also known as Humbert Willing (16 August 1878 – 15 September 1943), was a Dutch football referee who officiated 15 international matches between 1906 and 1914.

== Career ==
=== League referee ===
Born on 16 August 1878 in Rotterdam, Willing began his refereeing career as a referee in 1900, quickly establishing himself as a regular in the top-flight of Dutch football. On 14 October 1900, he arrived just before the kick-off of a match between Sparta and Ajax, which caused A. C. van IJzeren, the captain of Sparta, to refuse to play. Between 1911 and 1920, Willing oversaw several Ajax matches.

=== International referee ===
On 3 January 1904, Willing refereed the 1904 Coupe Vanden Abeele, a friendly an cup duel between the Low Countries in Antwerp, which ended in a 6–4 victory to the Belgians. After several years in the Dutch First Division, the Referees Committee of the Dutch FA nominated him as an international referee, thus becoming a member of FIFA, and as such, he oversaw a total of 15 international matches between 1906 and 1904.

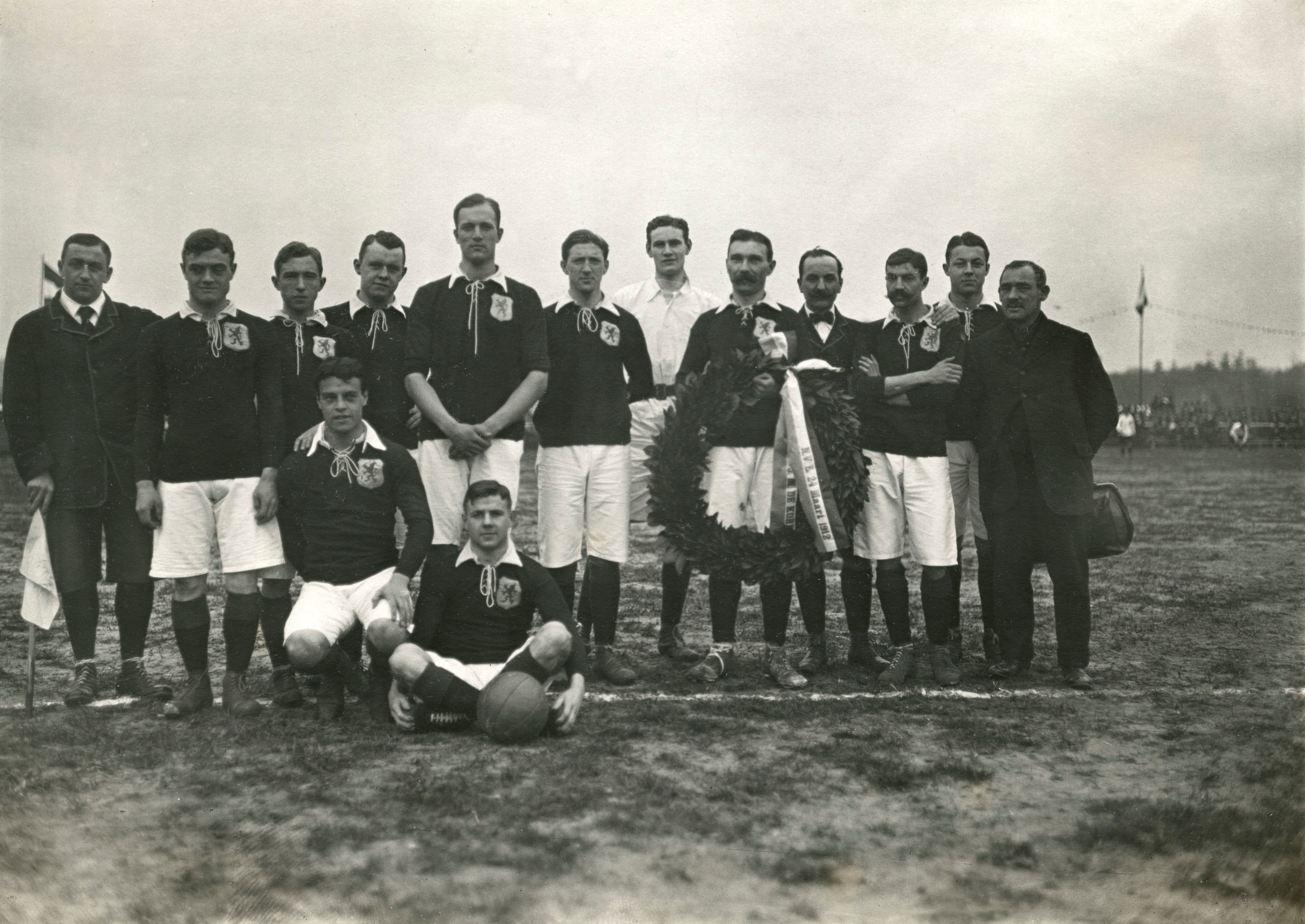
Willing (most left) in 1912 together with the Netherlands Football Team

In his official international debut on 13 May 1906, the 27-year-old Willing officiated another Low Countries derby between the Netherlands and Belgium, this time in his hometown of Rotterdam, which ended in a 2–3 win to the Belgians. The highlight of his career came at the 1912 Summer Olympics in Stockholm, where he was one of only two Dutch referees in the tournament, the other being Christiaan Groothoff. There, he oversaw a total of four matches, three of which in the consolation tournament: The first round between Italy and Sweden, the semifinal between Austria and Italy, and the final between Austria and Hungary, where he did not hesitate to interrupt the match early in the second half to warn both team captains to "play a more gentlemanly game". After the tournament, the Dutch newspaper De Maasboode wrote an article about the two Dutch referees, in which they praised Willing as "the best referee at the Olympics".

After the Olympics, Willing oversaw a further five friendly matches, including one between France and Italy at new stadium in Saint-Ouen, which the French won 1–0. The following day, the French newspaper L'Auto (the future L'Équipe) stated that he "is severe, but his decisions were always fair and had everyone's approval".

== Death ==
Willing died on 15 September 1943, at the age of 65.
