= Andreas Franz =

German footballer (1897–1970)

Personal information
- Date of birth: 27 June 1897
- Place of birth: Fürth, Germany
- Date of death: 2 May 1970 (aged 72)
- Position: Forward

Youth career
- 1909–1912: TV Fürth 1860
- 1912–1915: SpVgg Fürth

Senior career*
Years	Team	Apps	(Gls)
1915–1933	SpVgg Fürth	309+	(333+)
1933–1934	VfR Heilbronn	4	(2)
1934–1939	TV Fürth 1860		
Total		313+	(335+)

International career
1922–1926	Germany	10	(4)

Managerial career
- 1933–1934: VfR Heilbronn
- 1934–1939: TV Fürth 1860
- 1946–1947: ASV Fürth
- TV 48 Erlangen
- 1952–1958: SpVgg Fürth Amateure
- * Club domestic league appearances and goals

Andreas "Resi" Franz (27 June 1897 – 2 May 1970) was a German footballer who played as a forward, notably for SpVgg Fürth and the Germany national team.

== Club career ==
Franz was a prolific goalscorer for SpVgg Fürth in the final rounds of the German football championship. Andreas scored over 724 goals for SpVgg Fürth including friendlies.

== International career ==
In his fifth international match against Austria Andreas Franz scored a hattrick.

== Career statistics ==
Appearances and goals by club, season, and competition. Only official games are included in this table.
Club	Season	Regional Championship		Southern Germany		German Championship		South German Cup		Total	
Club	Season	Apps	Goals	Apps	Goals	Apps	Goals	Apps	Goals	Apps	Goals
SpVgg Fürth	1915/1916	0	0	0	0	0	0	0	0	0	0
SpVgg Fürth	1916/1917	8+	13+	2+	6+	0	0	0	0	10+	19+
SpVgg Fürth	1917/1918	5+	13+	0	0	0	0	4	1	9+	14+
SpVgg Fürth	1918/1919	10+	18+	0	0	0	0	1	0	11+	18+
SpVgg Fürth	1919/1920	9+	13+	0	0	3	2	1	0	13+	15+
SpVgg Fürth	1920/1921	18+	28+	0	0	0	0	0	0	18+	28+
SpVgg Fürth	1921/1922	11+	19+	3	0	0	0	0	0	14+	19+
SpVgg Fürth	1922/1923	13	20	4	7	2	3	4	9	23	39
SpVgg Fürth	1923/1924	14	6	9	5	0	0	0	0	23	11
SpVgg Fürth	1924/1925	14	10	0	0	4	4	3	3	21	17
SpVgg Fürth	1925/1926	12	11	10	5	0	0	6	12	28	28
SpVgg Fürth	1926/1927	10	7	10	13	3	6	4	2	27	28
SpVgg Fürth	1927/1928	16	17	14	19	0	0	0	0	30	36
SpVgg Fürth	1928/1929	11	10	14	22	4	4	0	0	29	36
SpVgg Fürth	1929/1930	9	13	10	8	2	4	0	0	21	25
SpVgg Fürth	1930/1931	13	11	11	4	2	3	0	0	26	18
SpVgg Fürth	1931/1932	17	11	12	5	0	0	0	0	29	16
SpVgg Fürth	1932/1933	10	9	1	0	0	0	0	0	11	9
VfR Heilbronn	1933/1934	4	2	0	0	0	0	0	0	4	2
VfR Heilbronn	Total	204+	231+	100+	94+	30	30	23+	27+	357+	382+
