= Theo van Zwieteren =

Belgian football referee (1887–1962)

- Born: 6 January 1887; Rotterdam, Netherlands
- Died: 11 December 1962 (aged 75); Voorburg, Netherlands

Domestic
Years	League	Role
1922–1924	Dutch First Division	Referee

International
Years	League	Role
1923–1925	FIFA listed	Referee

Theodorus van Zwieteren (6 January 1887 – 11 December 1962) was a Dutch football referee who officiated three international matches between 1923 and 1925. He was also a linesman at the 1924 Summer Olympics.

== Refereeing career ==
In 1922, the 33-year-old van Zwieteren became a referee in the Dutch First Division, where he refereed a total of six Ajax matches, which ended in three losses and three draws. The following year, the Referees Committee of the Dutch FA nominated him as an international referee, thus becoming a member of FIFA, officiating a total of three international matches between 1923 and 1925.

In his international debut on 4 November 1923, van Zwieteren officiated a friendly match between Germany and Norway in Hamburg, which ended in a 1–0 win to the former. At the 1924 Olympic Games in Paris, he worked as a linesman in one match, the quarter-finals between France and the eventual champions Uruguay. The following year, in May, he refereed another France match, this time a friendly against England, losing again (2–3), and also in May, he oversaw a match between Uruguay's Club Nacional and Belgium, which ended in a 2–1 win to the latter.

== Personal and death ==
Theo van Zwieteren was born on 6 January 1887 to Theodorus Johannes van Zwieteren and Margaretha Apolina de Koster. He was the eldest of nine siblings. One of his brothers was Willy van Zwieteren, who played for Sparta Rotterdam and for the Netherlands national football team. Theo van Zwieren's first cousin once removed, Teddy Scholten, won the Eurovision Song Contest 1959.

Theo van Zwieteren played field tennis and was a lifelong member of Sparta Rotterdam. He died in Voorburg on 11 December 1962, at the age of 75.
