= Kurt Voß =

German footballer

Personal information
- Date of birth: 8 July 1900
- Date of death: 8 April 1978 (aged 77)
- Position: Forward

Senior career*
Years	Team	Apps	(Gls)
- Holstein Kiel

International career
1925	Germany	2	(2)
- * Club domestic league appearances and goals

Kurt Voß (8 July 1900 – 8 April 1978) was a German international footballer.
