= TV Fürth 1860 =

Logo

TV 1860 Fürth is a multi-sport club from Fürth, Germany. Among others the club has had sections for athletics, football, handball, tennis and fencing.

== Athletics ==
The athletics section founded the club LAC Quelle Fürth in 1969.

== Football ==
The football section founded the club SG Quelle Fürth in 1973.
