= Ernst Rokosch =

German footballer

Personal information
- Full name: Ernst Rokosch
- Date of birth: 26 February 1889
- Place of birth: Leipzig, German Empire
- Position: Defender

Senior career*
Years	Team	Apps	(Gls)
1906–1924	SpVgg Leipzig		

International career
1914	Germany	1	(0)
- * Club domestic league appearances and goals

Ernst Rokosch (26 February 1889; date of death unknown) was a German footballer who played as a defender and made one appearance for the Germany national team.

== Career ==
Rokosch earned his first and only cap for Germany on 5 April 1914 in a friendly against the Netherlands. The away match, which was played in Amsterdam, finished as a 4–4 draw.

== Career statistics ==
=== International ===
Germany
Year	Apps	Goals
1914	1	0
Total	1	0
