= Georg Frank =

German footballer

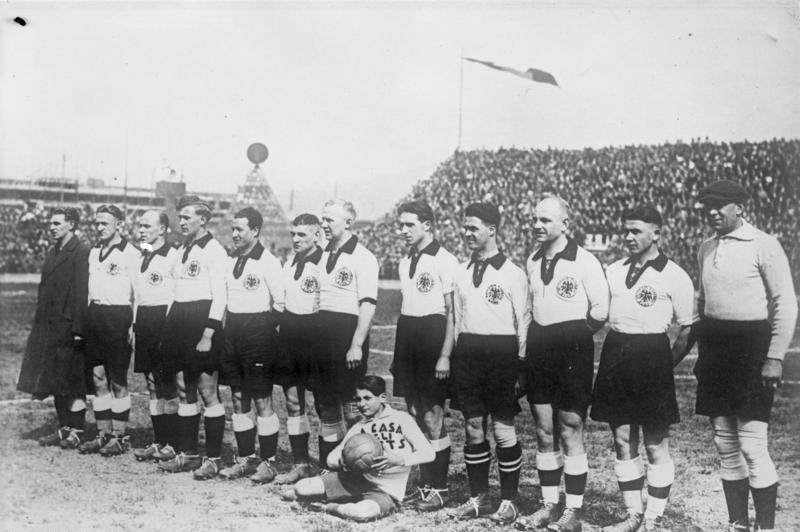
- The Germany national team before a match against Italy in 1929. Frank is second from right.

Personal information
- Date of birth: 14 December 1907
- Place of birth: Fürth, Germany
- Date of death: 13 November 1944 (aged 36)
- Place of death: Skarżysko-Kamienna, German-occupied Poland
- Position: Striker

Youth career
- –1926: SpVgg Fürth

Senior career*
| Years | Team | Apps | (Gls) |
| 1926–1944 | SpVgg Fürth | 280+ | (206+) |

International career
| 1927–1930 | Germany | 4 | (5) |
- * Club domestic league appearances and goals

Georg "Allan" Frank (14 December 1907 – 13 November 1944) was a German international footballer.

Frank scored four goals as Germany thrashed Switzerland 7–1 in a friendly on 10 February 1929.

== Personal life ==
Frank served as a Stabsgefreiter (corporal) in the German Army during the Second World War. He was killed in action in Poland on 13 November 1944.
