= Willy van Zwieteren =

Dutch footballer (1904–1983)

Personal information
- Full name: Willebrordus van Zwieteren
- Date of birth: 15 January 1904
- Date of death: 26 November 1983 (aged 79)
- Position: Defender

Senior career*
Years	Team	Apps	(Gls)
- Sparta Rotterdam

International career
1929	Netherlands	1	(0)
- * Club domestic league appearances and goals

Willebrordus "Willy" 'van Zwieteren (15 January 1904 – 26 November 1983) was a Dutch footballer who played as a defender for Sparta Rotterdam. He made one appearance for the Netherlands national team in 1929.
