= Ludwig Hofmann (footballer) =

German footballer and manager

Personal information
- Date of birth: 9 June 1900
- Place of birth: Munich, Germany
- Date of death: 2 October 1935 (aged 35)
- Position: Winger

Youth career
- –1916: FC Isaria
- 1916–1917: Bayern Munich

Senior career*
Years	Team	Apps	(Gls)
1917–1932	Bayern Munich		

International career
1926–1931	Germany	18	(4)

Managerial career
- 1934–1935: Bayern Munich
- * Club domestic league appearances and goals

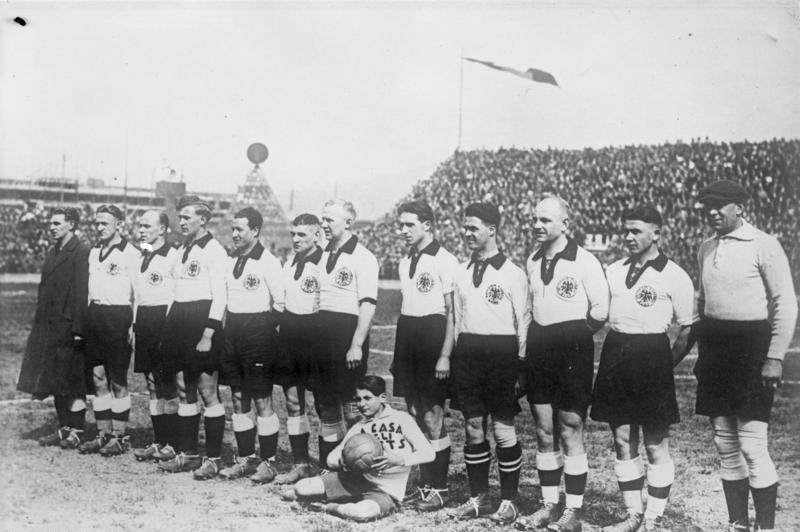
Bundesarchiv Bild 102–07723, Mailand, Fussballspiel Italien-Deutschland

Ludwig Hofmann (9 June 1900 – 10 October 1935) was a German footballer. He was part of Germany's team for the 1928 Summer Olympics.

== Career ==
With his club Bayern Munich he reached three times the final matches of the German championships. Hofmann scored 4 times in 18 internationals for Germany.
