= Karl Wegele =

German footballer

Personal information
- Date of birth: 27 September 1887
- Place of birth: Karlsruhe, Germany
- Date of death: 14 November 1960 (aged 73)
- Position: Forward

Senior career*
Years	Team	Apps	(Gls)
1903–1922	Phönix Karlsruhe		

International career
1910–1914	Germany	15	(3)
- * Club domestic league appearances and goals

Karl Wegele (27 September 1887 – 11 November 1960) was a German amateur football (soccer) player who competed in the 1912 Summer Olympics.

== Career ==
The forward won the German football championship in 1909 with Phönix Karlsruhe.

He was a member of the German Olympic squad and played one match in the main tournament as well as one match in the consolation tournament. Overall Wegele won 15 caps before the First World War.
