= Richard Hofmann =

German footballer

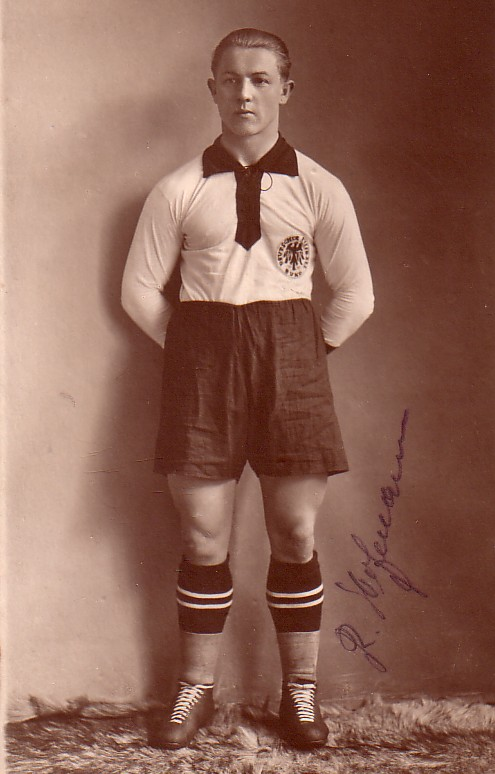

Personal information
- Date of birth: 8 February 1906
- Place of birth: Meerane, German Empire
- Date of death: 5 May 1983 (aged 77)
- Place of death: Freital, East Germany
- Height: 1.68 m (5 ft 6 in)
- Position: Forward

Senior career*
Years	Team	Apps	(Gls)
1922–1927	Meerane 07		
1927–1947	Dresdner SC	337	(226)
- BSG Hainsberg

International career
1927–1933	Germany	25	(24)
- * Club domestic league appearances and goals

Richard Hofmann (8 February 1906 – 5 May 1983) was a German football player. He played in 25 internationals for Germany as a centre forward, scoring 24 goals, including the first ever international hat-trick against England by a player from outside the Home Nations.

== Life and career ==
He was born in Meerane, Saxony and began his career with the Meerane 07 club in 1922. In 1927 he was signed by English coach Jimmy Hogan for Dresdner SC, becoming known to fans as "König" ("King") Richard. He was known for his thunderous shots with either foot. He started his international career in 1927, scoring a hat-trick against Switzerland. At the 1928 Olympic Games in Amsterdam he was sent off in a match against Uruguay, and was suspended from internationals for a year.

In 1930, Hofmann lost his right ear in a car accident. This impaired his balance and had a serious impact on his career, later playing with protection over his ear. However, on 10 May 1930, playing for the Germany national team against England in Berlin, he scored a hat-trick in a 3–3 draw. He also scored hat-tricks for the national team against Sweden (1929), Denmark (1931) and Finland (1932). In all, he played 25 times for the national team, scoring 24 goals. He captained the German team in four matches, and earned his last cap against France in 1933. Later that year he was suspended from the national team for a "violation of his amateur status", after signing an advertising deal for a cigarette company. However, he continued to play with the Dresdner SC team until 1947, when he joined BSG Hainsberg and later Lok Stendal as a coach.

Hofmann died in 1983 in Freital, Saxony, then in East Germany. The main football stadium in Meerane is named Richard-Hofmann-Stadium in his honour. His son Bernd was also a footballer, mainly for Dynamo Dresden.

== Honours ==
Dresdner SC

- German Championship: 1943, 1944
- German Cup: 1940, 1941
- Mitteldeutsche Meisterschaft: 1929, 1930, 1931, 1933
- Gauliga Sachsen: 1933–34, 1938–39, 1939–40, 1940–41, 1942–43, 1943–44
