= Richard Queck =

German footballer

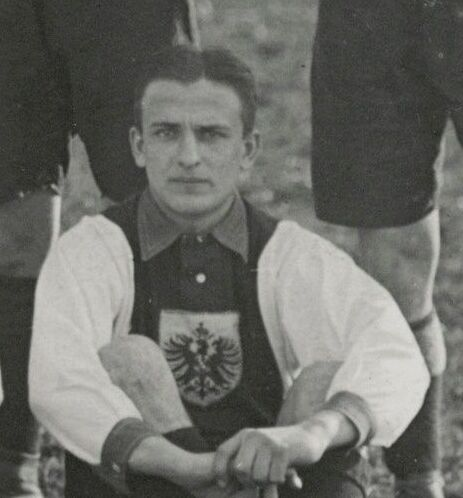

Personal information
- Full name: Richard Queck
- Date of birth: 4 November 1888
- Date of death: 20 December 1968 (aged 80)
- Position: Forward

Senior career*
Years	Team	Apps	(Gls)
1907–1914	Eintracht Braunschweig		

International career
1909–1914	Germany	3	(2)
- * Club domestic league appearances and goals

Richard Queck (4 November 1888 – 20 December 1968) was a German footballer who played for Eintracht Braunschweig from 1907 to 1914. Richard Queck and his younger brother Rudolf Queck helped their club win the Northern German Championship in 1908 and 1913. Playing as left midfielder or winger he was known for his dribbling and goal scoring skills. He was the third player from Eintracht Braunschweig to be called to the Germany national team.

== International career ==
Queck was also capped three times for the Germany national team – in 1909, 1910, and 1914, scoring two goals.

=== International goals ===
Scores and results table. Germany's goal tally first:

#	Date	Venue	Opponent	Score	Result	Competition
1.	16 October 1910	VfB-Platz, Kleve, Germany	Netherlands	1–2	1–2	Friendly
2.	5 April 1914	Oude Stadion, Amsterdam, Netherlands	Netherlands	1–1	4–4	Friendly
