= KFV-Platz an der Telegrafenkaserne =

Football stadium in Karlsruhe, Germany

The KFV-Platz an der Telegrafenkaserne was a football stadium in Karlsruhe.

== History ==
In 1904, the Karlsruher FV received from the city a 20,000 square meter site for the construction of a sports field. The stadium was opened on 1 October 1905 under the auspices of Prince Max von Baden. 2000 spectators saw the 8-0 victory of the Karlsruher FV over the FC Zurich. The provisional grandstand was initially occupied by flatbed wagons of a haulage contractor. One year later, a Cinder Track was built before a club house and tennissquares were added in 1908.

The Karlsruher FV was one of the leading German football clubs until the outbreak of World War I. He became German champion in 1910 and 1905 and 1912 German runner-up. On 1 May 1910 saw 8000 spectators the 2: 1 victory of the Karlsruher FV in German Football Championship 1909/10 semi-final match for the German championship against FC Karlsruhe Phönix Karlsruhe Karlsruhe. From this game exists the oldest surviving movie recording of a football match in Germany. A few weeks earlier, the Germany national team played in front of 7000 spectators a 1-0 win against the Switzerland on 4 April. It was the first home win of the Germany national team.

In World War II, the KFV Square was the target of numerous air attacks, but was completely destroyed in 1944 and confiscated by the United States Army until 1 February 1946. In the late 1940s, there were plans to expand the KFV square into a large stadium for 30,000 to 40,000 spectators. But the city would rather build apartments. In self-direction, the club expanded the stadium for 40,000 spectators and took over financially. The city issued the club in 1948 and 1949 part of the space rental, so that a bankruptcy could be avoided. From 1945 to 1947, the Karlsruher FV played in the time first-class Football Oberliga South and from 1952 to 1957 in the second-rate II. Division.

The attendance record on the KFV-place was put up by other clubs. At the German Football Championship 1948/49, on 19 June 1949, 35,000 spectators watched the quarter-final replay between Wormatia Worms and Kickers Offenbach, which the Kickers win 2-0 could. The Karlsruher FV slid down into the amateur camp and was in October 2004 by the Baden Football Association excluded because the club could not meet the financial requirements. Two years later, the stadium was demolished. On the southern part of the site is today a nursing home.
