= Hans Kalb =

German footballer (1899–1945)

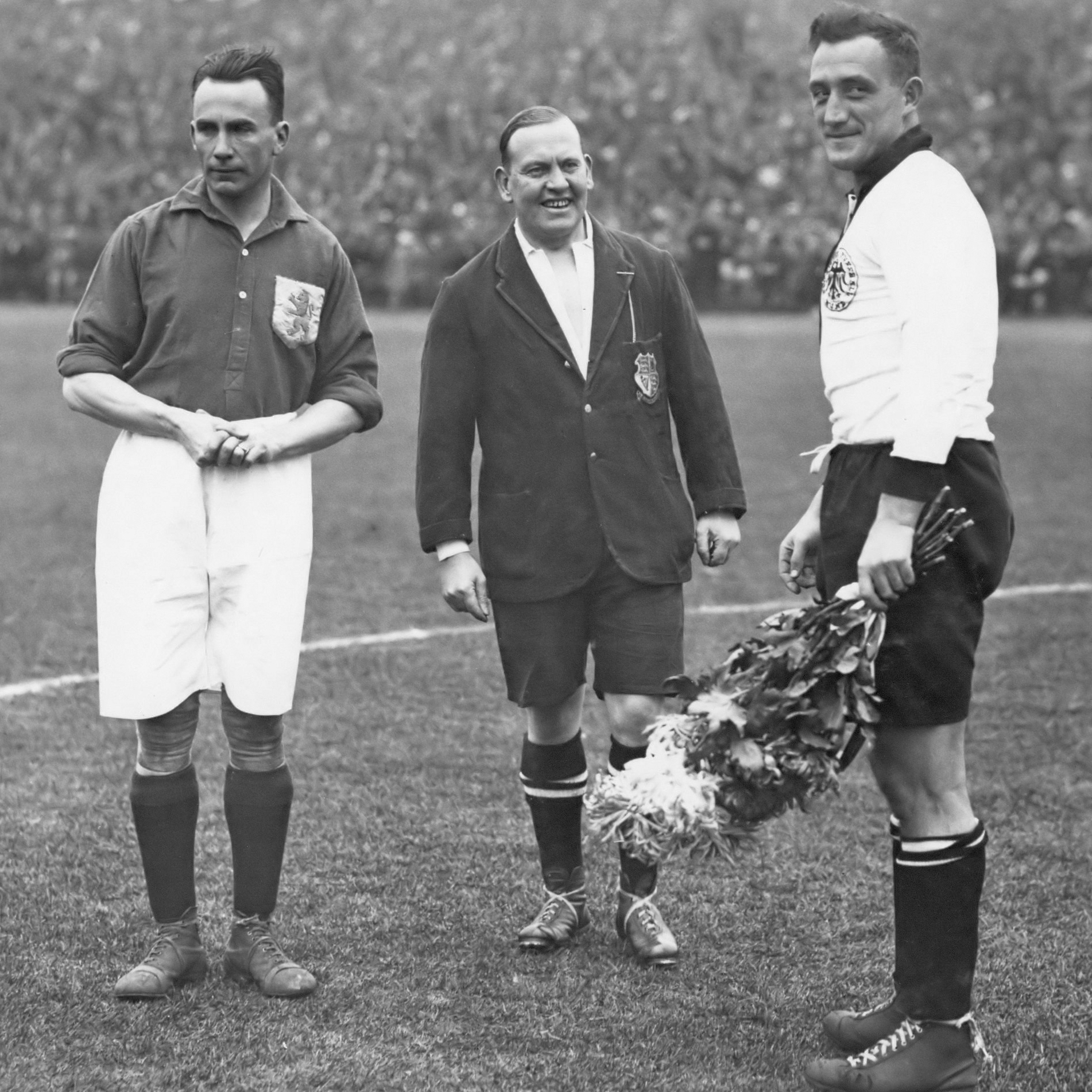
- Harry Dénis, Albert Prince-Cox & Hans Kalb (1927)

Personal information
- Date of birth: 3 August 1899
- Place of birth: Nuremberg, Germany
- Date of death: 5 April 1945 (aged 45)
- Position: Defender

Senior career*
Years	Team	Apps	(Gls)
1917–1933	1. FC Nürnberg		

International career
1920–1928	Germany	15	(2)
- * Club domestic league appearances and goals

Hans Kalb (3 August 1899 – 5 April 1945) was a German international footballer.

== International career ==
The 1. FC Nürnberg player won 15 caps (two goals) for Germany. Kalb was sent off in the match against Uruguay at the 1928 Olympic Games for a deliberate foul against Uruguayan goal scorer Pedro Petrone. Uruguay won the game 4–1, and Kalb received a two years ban from the German Football Association which ended his international career.

== Personal life ==
In the First World War he served as an artilleryman in the German Army.

Outside football, Kalb was a dental surgeon who practised in Nuremberg. He died from an infection contracted in surgery.
