= Egil Jacobsen (footballer) =

Norwegian footballer (1899-1978)

Personal information
- Date of birth: 25 September 1899
- Date of death: 14 December 1978 (aged 79)

International career
Years	Team	Apps	(Gls)
1923–1927	Norway	5	(1)

Egil Jacobsen (25 September 1899 – 14 December 1978) was a Norwegian footballer. He played in five matches for the Norway national football team from 1923 to 1927.
