= Gottfried Fuchs =

German footballer (1889–1972)

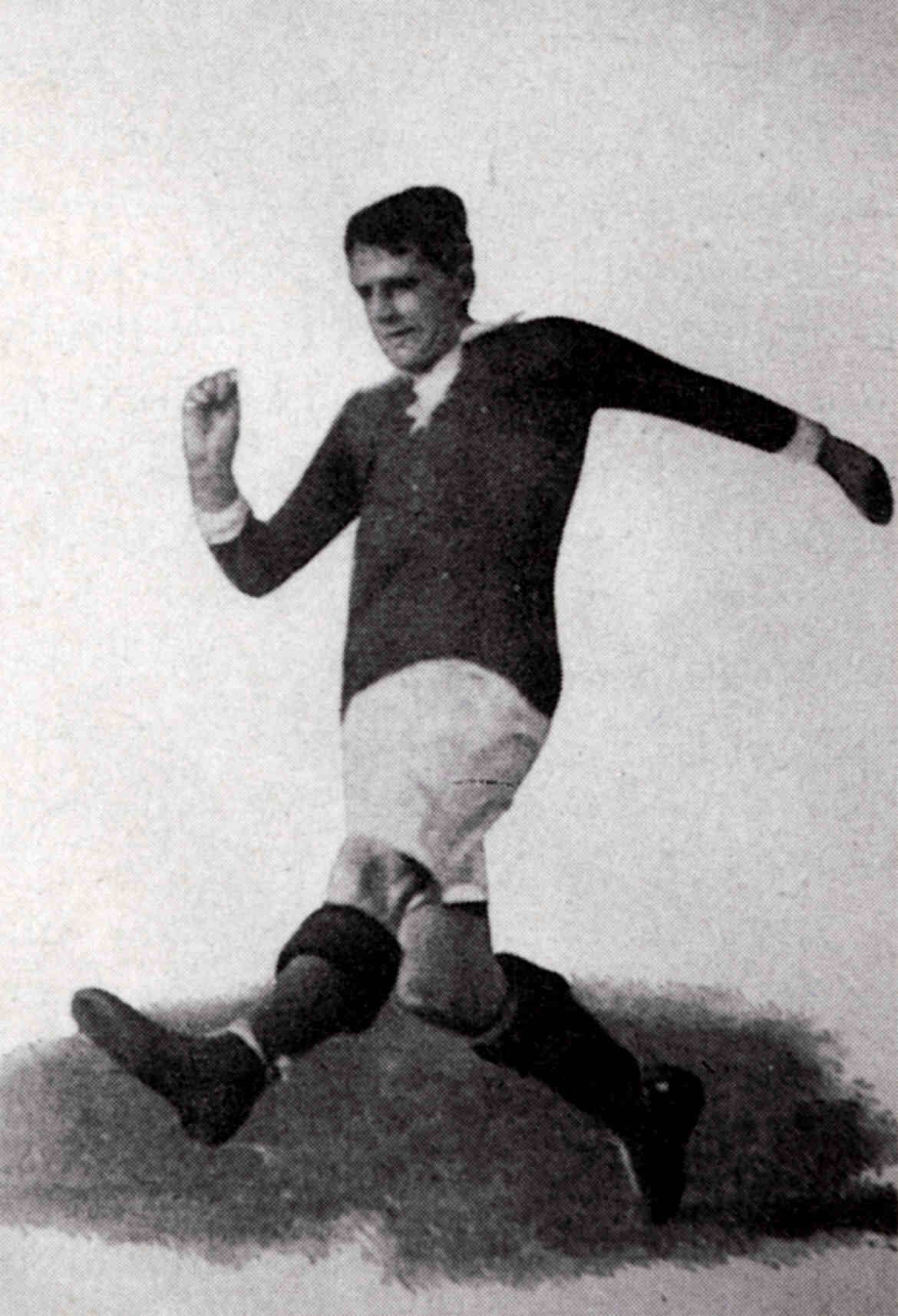

Personal information
- Full name: Gottfried Erik Fuchs; later Godfrey Fuchs
- Date of birth: 3 May 1889
- Place of birth: Karlsruhe, Germany
- Date of death: 25 February 1972 (aged 82)
- Place of death: Westmount, Quebec, Canada
- Position: Forward

Senior career*
| Years | Team | Apps | (Gls) |
| 1904–1906 | Düsseldorfer SC 1899 | | |
| 1906–1914 | Karlsruher FV | | |
| 1914–1920 | Düsseldorfer SC 1899 | | |

International career
| 1907–1913 | Germany | 6 | (13) |
- * Club domestic league appearances and goals

Gottfried Erik Fuchs (3 May 1889 – 25 February 1972), also known as Godfrey Fuchs, was a German Olympic footballer. He scored a then-world record 10 goals for the Germany national team in a 16–0 win against Russia at the 1912 Olympics. He left Germany to escape the Holocaust, as he was Jewish, and ultimately emigrated to Canada.

== Biography ==
Fuchs debuted for the Germany national team at the age of 18.

He played for Düsseldorfer SC 1899 (1904–06, 1914–20), and Karlsruher FV (1906–14)—winning the German national title in 1910, beating Holstein Kiel 1–0. In 1912, they lost the final against Holstein Kiel, 1–0. Between 1911 and 1913 he was considered the best centre in the world. During this time period, he earned six caps and scored 13 goals. Fuchs was part of the legendary attacking trio of Karlsruher FV with Fritz Förderer and Julius Hirsch (who was killed in Auschwitz).

He was the first German player to score four goals in a single match.

He is remembered for scoring a world record 10 goals for Germany in a 16–0 win against Russia at the 1912 Olympics in Stockholm on 1 July, becoming the top scorer of the tournament; his international record was not surpassed until 2001 when Australia's Archie Thompson scored 13 goals in a 31–0 defeat of American Samoa. This performance of 10 goals in one international match tied a record set by Sophus Nielsen at the 1908 Summer Olympics, which remained on the books until 2001. The German Football Association erased all references to him from their records between 1933 and 1945. He had the record of being the top German scorer in one match.

He served in the German Army in World War I as an artillery officer and was awarded the Iron Cross.

In 1928, he and his family moved to Berlin. He was a member of the local tennis club Nikolassee e. V., but it barred him from membership in 1935.

A German Jew, he was exiled and fled Nazi Germany in 1937 because of the Holocaust and emigrated first to England and then in 1940 to Canada. His older brother was composer and architect Richard Fuchs.

When, years after the Holocaust in 1972, German former player and national team coach Sepp Herberger asked the German Football Association vice president Hermann Neuberger to invite Fuchs as a guest or a guest of honour to an international against Russia on the 60th anniversary of Fuchs' performance for the German team, the DFB Executive Committee declined to do so, writing that it was not willing to invite Fuchs because it would have created an unfortunate precedent (as was pointed out, given that Fuchs was the last remaining former Jewish German international, the DFB's concern about creating a precedent was a difficult one to understand).

== See also ==
- List of select Jewish football (association; soccer) players
