= Adolf Jäger =

German footballer

Personal information
- Date of birth: 31 March 1889
- Place of birth: Altona/Elbe, German Empire
- Date of death: 21 November 1944 (aged 55)
- Place of death: Altona, Germany
- Position: Forward

Youth career
- 1903–1907: SC Union 03 Altona

Senior career*
Years	Team	Apps	(Gls)
1907–1927	FC Altona 93	120+	(197+)

International career
1908–1924	Germany	18	(11)
- * Club domestic league appearances and goals

Adolf Jäger (31 March 1889 – 21 November 1944) was a German amateur football player who competed in the 1912 Summer Olympics.

== Club career ==
Jäger was born in a corner house in Eimsbüttel as the son of a shoemaker and began his career with the youth team of SC Union 03 Altona, for which he was also active as a schlagball. He was signed by Hamburg's Altona 93 in 1907, making his debut on Christmas Day of 1907 against the Dutch club FC Dordrecht, and going on to score over 2000 goals in over 700 amateur matches. However, the only proof or evidence, of this claim, may lie within newspaper articles from the time he played.

Two injuries further shortened his military career and saved him from the fate of his teammates, who would not return. He became the son of our city, and as such, several attempts were made to poach him, but like Uwe Seeler later at Hamburger SV, Jäger also remained loyal to his club. Jäger stayed loyal to the club for two decades (1907–1927), playing his last match on 6 February 1927, when he celebrated an acclaimed farewell, scoring twice for his North Germany team in a victory over West Germany. He was awarded the highest award in German sport at the time, the Eagle Plaque.

Jäger was an all-round athlete, as evidenced by a record long throw and running 100 meters in 11.4 seconds in a military championship.

== International career ==
Within only a year of his club debut, Jäger was called by the German national team, making his debut in a friendly match against Austria on 7 June 1908, aged 19, and scoring a goal in a 3–2 loss. He was a member of the German Olympic squad that participated in the football tournament of the 1912 Summer Olympics in Stockholm, in which Germany only played in the first round as they were knocked out 1–5 by Austria, where Jäger scored Germany's only goal in the tournament.

He played his last game as a national player on 14 December 1924 in Stuttgart in a 1–1 draw against Switzerland. In total, Jäger scored eleven goals, three from penalties, in 18 international appearances for the senior national team, ten as captain, thus becoming the first player to lead the team onto the field as captain ten times until Ludwig Leinberger beat him with eleven games on 1 January 1933.

Jäger also played 51 matches for the national team of the Northern German Football Association, including 26 appearances in the Bundespokal, where he scored 35 goals and won the title in 1914, 1917 and 1919.

== Style of play ==
Jäger was a tall striker with early baldness who shone with his delicate technique and understanding of the game. Unlike his powerful HSV counterpart Otto Harder, with whom he stormed together in the North German selection and also in the national team, Jäger repeatedly convinced the critics with intelligent passes, especially in the wings. Today, he would be referred to as a "classic 10".

A contemporary described his style of play in 1925 as follows: "Jäger's wing assists in colorful variety with a half-high ball pass or short pass template in midfield, used as needed and appropriate". The later national team coach Otto Nerz called him "one of the greatest geniuses of German football and the creator of the modern combination game".

== Later life ==
Shortly after World War I, from which he returned as a sergeant in the reserve, Jäger opened a tobacco shop, and soon after, with a fellow player, he opened a thriving men's clothing store: "Jäger & Koch". His contacts through sport opened some doors for him, including being friends with boxing idol Max Schmeling. At the end of his twenties, he was successful in the publishing business with an advertising agency alongside John Jahr.

Shortly before the end of World War II, Jäger died while attempting to defuse a bomb at the Elbe riverside in Hamburg right after an American air raid, and is buried in Altona Main Cemetery.

== Legacy ==
Shortly after he died in 1944, the football stadium of his club Altona 93 was renamed as Adolf Jäger fighting track in tribute to Jäger. The women's football team of Altona 93, which is made up of 150 women and girls, hence being the largest female football department in Germany, plays in this field.

The German newspaper Taz nominated him for the All-Century Team in 1999.

== Career statistics ==
Appearances and goals by club, season, and competition. Only official games are included in this table.
Club	Season	Regional Championship		Northern Germany		German Championship		North German Cup		Total	
Club	Season	Apps	Goals	Apps	Goals	Apps	Goals	Apps	Goals	Apps	Goals
Altona 93
Altona 93	1908–09	0	0	0	0	2	2	0	0	0	0
Altona 93	1909–10	0	0	0	0	0	0	0	0	0	0
Altona 93	1910–11	0	0	0	0	0	0	0	0	0	0
Altona 93	1911–12	6+	6+	1+	3+	0	0	0	0	7+	9+
Altona 93	1912–13	8+	16+	0	0	0	0	0	0	8+	16+
Altona 93	1913–14	10+	15+	0	0	1	0	0	0	10+	15+
Altona 93	1914–15	0	0	0	0	0	0	0	0	0	0
Altona 93	1915–16	0	0	0	0	0	0	0	0	0	0
Altona 93	1916–17	1+	2+	0	0	0	0	0	0	1+	2+
Altona 93	1917–18	0	0	0	0	0	0	0	0	0	0
Altona 93	1918–19	0	0	0	0	0	0	0	0	0	0
Altona 93	1919–20	12+	17+	0	0	0	0	0	0	12+	17+
Altona 93	1920–21	13+	16+	0	0	0	0	0	0	13+	16+
Altona 93	1921–22	11+	17+	0	0	0	0	0	0	11+	17+
Altona 93	1922–23	14	27	0	0	0	0	0	0	14	27
Altona 93	1923–24	10+	11+	0	0	0	0	0	0	10+	11+
Altona 93	1924–25	14+	36+	5+	5+	2	2	0	0	21+	43+
Altona 93	1925–26	8+	14+	0	0	0	0	2+	1+	10+	15+
Altona 93	1926–27	2+	8+	0	0	0	0	0	0	2+	8+
Altona 93	Total	109+	185+	6+	8+	5	4	2+	1+	122+	198+
