= Ernst Möller =

German footballer

Personal information
- Date of birth: 19 August 1891
- Date of death: 8 November 1916 (aged 25)
- Position: Forward

Senior career*
Years	Team	Apps	(Gls)
- Holstein Kiel

International career
1911–1913	Germany	9	(4)
- * Club domestic league appearances and goals

Ernst Möller (19 August 1891 – 8 November 1916) was a German international footballer.
