= Fritz Förderer =

German footballer (1888–1952)

Personal information
- Date of birth: 5 January 1888
- Place of birth: Karlsruhe, Germany
- Date of death: 20 December 1952 (aged 64)
- Place of death: Weimar, Germany
- Position: Defender

Senior career*
Years	Team	Apps	(Gls)
- Karlsruher FV

International career
1912	Germany	2	(5)
- * Club domestic league appearances and goals

Friedrich "Fritz" Förderer (5 January 1888 – 20 December 1952) was a German amateur footballer who played as a defender and competed in the 1912 Summer Olympics.

== Biography ==
Förderer was born in Karlsruhe. He was a member of the German Olympic squad, played two matches in the consolation tournament, and scored five goals. He played for Karlsruher FV, where together with Julius Hirsch and Gottfried Fuchs he formed an attacking trio.

He joined the Nazi Party in 1942 and would go on to coach various football teams, including one composed of members of the Third SS Death-Head unit that ran the Buchenwald concentration camp.

He died in Weimar.
