= Josef Pöttinger =

German footballer

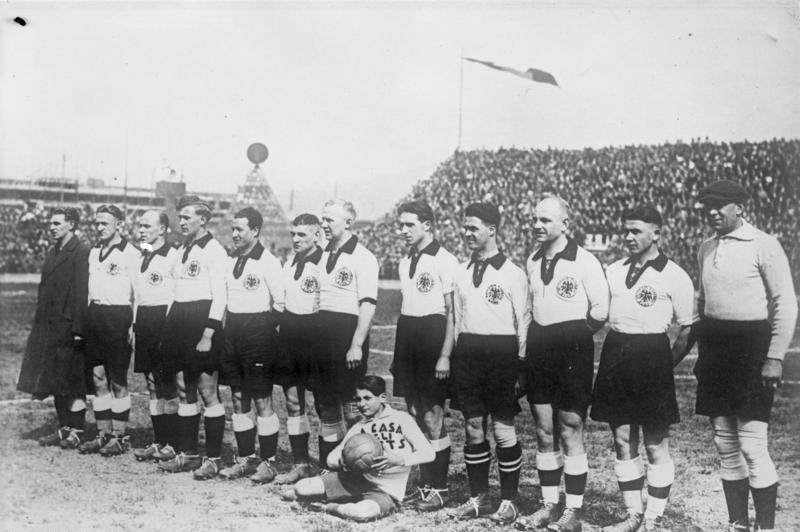

Personal information
- Date of birth: 16 April 1903
- Place of birth: Munich, German Empire
- Date of death: 9 September 1970 (aged 67)
- Place of death: Munich, West Germany
- Position: Striker

Senior career*
Years	Team	Apps	(Gls)
1919–1931	FC Bayern Munich	175	(189)

International career
1926–1930	Germany	14	(9)

Managerial career
- 1934–1938: 1. SV Jena
- 1939: VfB Stuttgart
- 1946–1947: FC Bayern Munich
- 1949–1951: BC Augsburg
- * Club domestic league appearances and goals

Josef Pöttinger (16 April 1903 – 9 September 1970) was a German football player. His nicknames were Sepp and Pötschge. During his career he played for Bayern Munich and had 14 appearances for Germany.

== Club career ==
Pöttinger debuted with 16 years in the first team of Bayern Munich. He was a striker, renowned for his technical excellence. His opponents' difficulties to stop him often resulted in brutal fouls, which led to constant injuries for Pöttinger and eventually to an early end of his career.

When Bayern Munich won the southgerman championship 1925–26 he had scored 57 times during the season. 1928 was the year of his greatest success with the club, when they reached the semifinals of the German championship. He had to end his career in 1930 due to knee-injury.

An interesting match among the friendly matches in the season 1926–27 was the game between Bayern Munich and FC Basel. Not only because of the result, Bayern won by ten goals to nil, but because of the goal scoring. On 3 April 1927, Bayern played at home in Munich and Pöttinger scored a "perfect" hat-trick within the first 12 minutes of the game (3', 10', 12') and in the second half he scored five consecutive goals (52', 60', 62', 68', 83').

== National team ==
His first game for the Germany national team was on 18 April 1926 in Düsseldorf against the Netherlands. In the 4:2 win he scored three times. He participated with his team in the Olympic Games 1928.

== Coaching ==
Pöttinger coached the VfB Pankow, 1. SV Jena, Teutonia Munich, VfB Stuttgart, FC Bayern Munich, 1. FC Lichtenfels, and BC Augsburg.
