= Julius Hirsch =

German footballer (1892–c.1945)

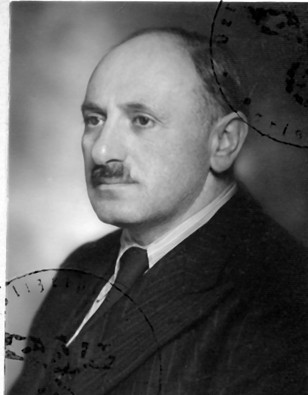
- Hirsch in 1938

Personal information
- Date of birth: 7 April 1892
- Place of birth: Achern, German Empire
- Date of death: declared dead 8 May 1945 (aged 53)
- Place of death: Auschwitz-Birkenau, German-occupied Poland
- Position: Left winger

Youth career
- 1902–1909: Karlsruher FV

Senior career*
| Years | Team | Apps | (Gls) |
| 1909–1913 | Karlsruher FV | | |
| 1913–1919 | SpVgg Fürth | 32 | (27) |
| 1919–1925 | Karlsruher FV | | |

International career
| 1911–1913 | Germany | 7 | (4) |
- * Club domestic league appearances and goals

Julius Hirsch (7 April 1892 – declared dead 8 May 1945) was a German international footballer. A Jew, he was executed at Auschwitz concentration camp during the Holocaust. He helped the Karlsruher FV win the 1910 German football championship, and also played for the Germany national team, including at the 1912 Summer Olympics. He then joined SpVgg Fürth, with whom he won the 1914 German football championship.

== Biography ==
Hirsch was born in Achern, Germany (and later lived in Karlsruhe), was Jewish, and was the seventh child of a Jewish merchant. He joined Karlsruher FV at the age of ten.

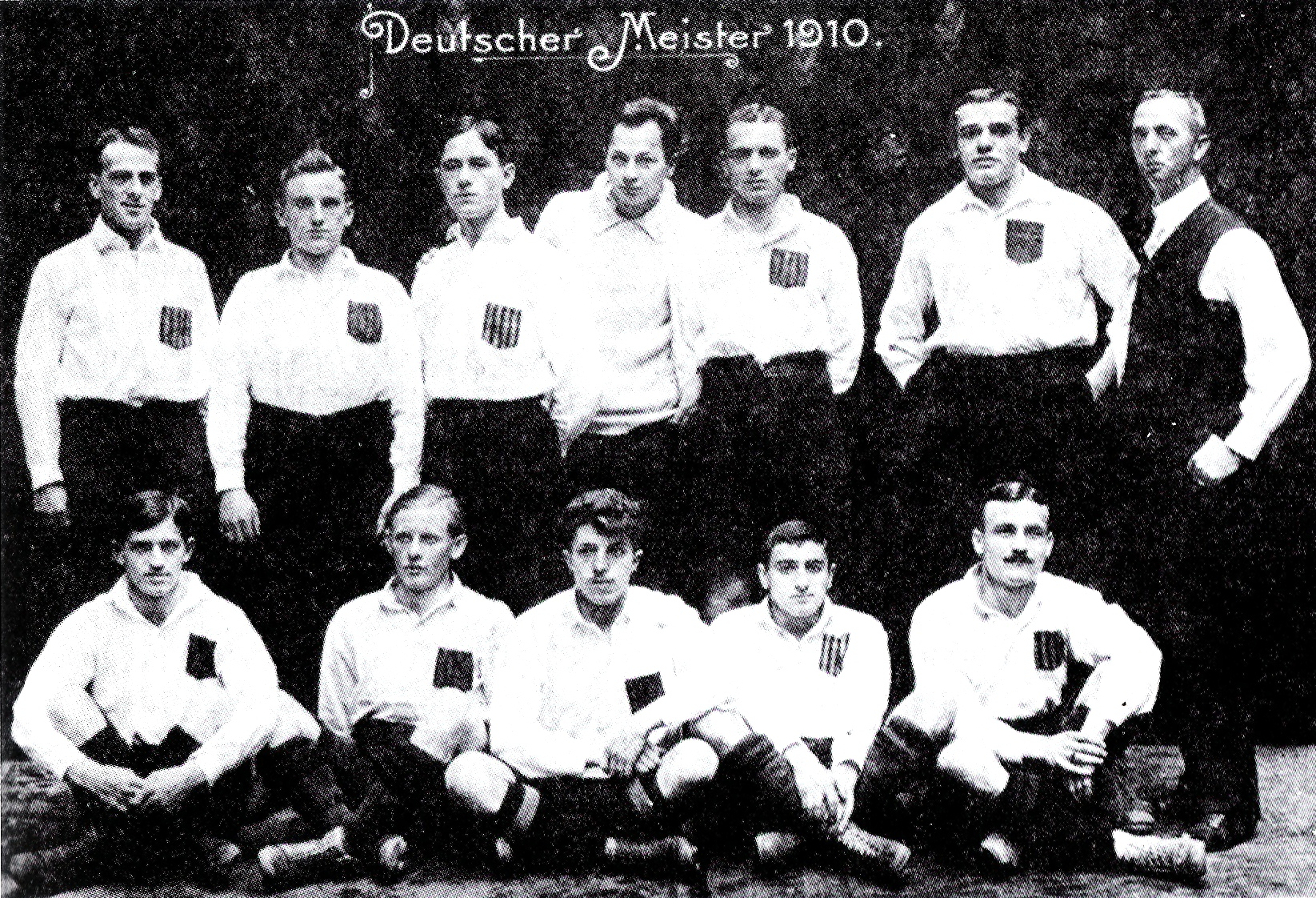
Karlsruher FV in 1910, with Hirsch lower right, one from the end

Together with Fritz Förderer and Gottfried Fuchs, Hirsch formed an attacking trio. Nicknamed "Juller", he was a dynamic midfielder and striker best known for his attacking style, his hard shot, and powerful left foot. He helped Karlsruher FV win the 1910 German football championship.

After joining SpVgg Fürth in 1913, he won the 1914 German football championship with them the following year.

Hirsch was the first Jewish player to represent the Germany national team, which he joined at 18 years of age in 1911. He played in a number of matches for Germany, including at the 1912 Olympic Games in Stockholm, Sweden. Hirsch scored four goals for Germany against the Netherlands in 1912, becoming the first German to score four goals in a single match.

Hirsch enlisted in and served for four years in the German Army in World War I, and was decorated with the Iron Cross. His brother Leopold was killed in action in June 1918, also fighting for the German Army.

He returned to KFV after World War I, and retired in 1925. However, he remained with the club as a youth coach.

== In the Holocaust ==
Reading in a newspaper on 10 April 1933 that all Southern German clubs would ban Jewish members, Hirsch left KFV by his own choice after over 30 years as a member. In a letter to his club he requested that it should not be forgotten that many Jews had given their life blood for the German nation and believed themselves to be true patriots, as shown by their deeds and words.

Hirsch's children Esther and Heinold, deemed second-grade "Mischlinge", were forced to leave their school in 1938. In 1941 they were required to wear the yellow star. In 1942 he divorced his non-Jewish wife in an effort to flee from the Nazis.

Hirsch, now 50 years old, was deported from Karlsruhe, Germany, to Auschwitz concentration camp on 1 March 1943. He had not believed that the government would harm him, as he had fought for Germany in World War I and played for Germany's national football team. His exact date of death is unknown. In 1950, a German court declared him dead with the date of death set on 8 May 1945, past his 53rd birthday and after the camp's occupation by the Red Army in January that year. His arrival was not registered in surviving camp records and it has been assumed from this he may have been gassed immediately after arrival in camp. In February 1945 his children were deported to Theresienstadt, from which they were liberated by the Red Army in May 1945.

== Legacy ==
Since 2005, the German Football Federation has awarded the "Julius-Hirsch-Preis" for outstanding examples of integration and tolerance within German football.

In January 2020, Chelsea unveiled a mural by Solomon Souza on an outside wall of the West Stand at Stamford Bridge stadium, as part of their 'Say No to Antisemitism' campaign. Included on the mural are depictions of footballers Hirsch and Árpád Weisz, who died at Auschwitz concentration camp, and Ron Jones, a British prisoner of war known as the 'Goalkeeper of Auschwitz'.

== See also ==
- List of select Jewish football (association; soccer) players
- List of people who disappeared mysteriously: post-1970
