= Gunnar Dahl =

Norwegian footballer (1900-1940)

Personal information
- Date of birth: 24 December 1900
- Place of birth: Horten, Norway
- Date of death: 31 January 1940 (aged 39)
- Place of death: Horten, Norway
- Position: Forward

International career
Years	Team	Apps	(Gls)
1924–1927	Norway	4	(1)

Gunnar Dahl (24 December 1900 – 31 January 1940) was a Norwegian footballer. He played in four matches for the Norway national football team from 1924 to 1927. Dahl died in a workplace explosion in Horten in 1940.
