= Walter Hempel (footballer) =

German footballer

Personal information
- Date of birth: 12 August 1887
- Place of birth: Leipzig, Germany
- Date of death: 5 December 1939 (aged 52)
- Position: Right back

Senior career*
| Years | Team | Apps | (Gls) |
| 1908–1923 | Sportfreunde Leipzig | | |

International career
| 1908–1912 | Germany | 11 | (0) |
- * Club domestic league appearances and goals

Walter Hempel (12 August 1887 – 5 December 1939) was a German amateur football player who competed in the 1912 Summer Olympics.

== International career ==
He played right back in the first international match played by Germany in 1908. Born in Leipzig, Hempel was a member of the German Olympic squad in 1912 and played one match in the consolation tournament of the Summer Games in Stockholm. Overall he won eleven caps for Germany.
