= Otto Harder =

German footballer and SS officer (1892–1956)

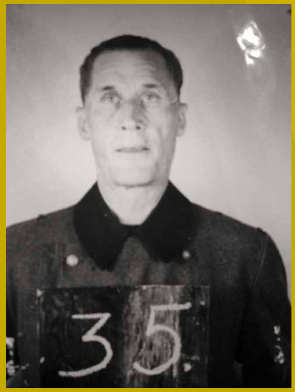

Personal information
- Full name: Otto Fritz Harder
- Date of birth: 25 November 1892
- Place of birth: Braunschweig, Germany
- Date of death: 4 March 1956 (aged 63)
- Place of death: Hamburg, West Germany
- Height: 1.90 m (6 ft 3 in)
- Position: Forward

Youth career
- –1909: FC Hohenzollern Braunschweig

Senior career*
Years	Team	Apps	(Gls)
1909–1912	Eintracht Braunschweig	2+	(2+)
1912–13	Hamburger FC		
1912–1913	Eintracht Braunschweig	1+	(1+)
1913–1919	Hamburger FC	15+	(24+)
1917	→ Stettiner SC (wartime guest)		
1919–1931	Hamburger SV	211	(378)
1931–1934	Victoria Hamburg	7+	(9+)
Total		236+	(412+)

International career
1914–1926	Germany	15	(14)
- * Club domestic league appearances and goals

Otto Fritz Harder (Nickname: Tull Harder; 25 November 1892 – 4 March 1956) was a German footballer and convicted war criminal who played for Eintracht Braunschweig, Hamburger SV, and Victoria Hamburg. He won two German football championships and played 15 times in the Germany national team. Harder was an SS officer and a warder at the Ahlem concentration camp in Hanover.

== Career ==
Harder was born in Braunschweig. He spent most of his career with Hamburger SV, scoring over 378 goals in 211 games. His football fame in Germany was comparable with Uwe Seeler's fame.

At the age of 16 he was discovered for football by FC Hohenzollern Braunschweig, and his impact was such that not even twelve months passed before the main club in the city, Eintracht Braunschweig, incorporated him into his ranks. There he received the nickname of "Tull" with which he would be known throughout his career, since his style of play was reminiscent of that of Tottenham Hotspur's center forward at the time, Walter Tull, the first black professional English player who died in action during World War I.

Initially, and since he was barely 17 years old, the young Tull Harder was only called up to play friendly matches with the Eintracht Braunschweig reserve team, which made him nervous, although this situation would not last long, since his quality and his tremendous physique ended up prevailing and he managed to make a career, as they say. At the beginning of 1912 he left for Hamburger SV for a few months. Eintracht Braunschweig fans wanted to avoid the departure of their young star at all costs. For this reason, they did not let him take the train to Hamburg, which he had to do almost secretly 25 kilometers from there, at the station in the neighboring town of Peine. Ultimately, Harder would play one more season with his hometown team before finally committing to Hamburger SV to play on the banks of the Elbe.

After the Great War, Harder soon established himself as the team's great star. Through him, Hamburger SV became one of the great German football teams in the 1920s, first reaching the 1922 German football championship against 1.FC Nürnberg, which officially did not have a champion, and finally making up for it. a year later, in 1923, the year in which Hamburger SV lifted its first German championship title after defeating Union Oberschöneweide by a clear 3–0. He would repeat that success in 1928, when he was already 36 years old. That season he established a record for eternity by scoring, on 15 January 1928, Harder scored no less than 12 goals against Wandsbeker FC with the final score was 18–5.

== Career in the Nazi Party ==
Following his football career, Harder ran an insurance agency, and in October 1932, he became a member of the NSDAP, before joining the SS in May 1933. In August 1939, he was drafted into the Waffen-SS, and served shortly at Sachsenhausen concentration camp, then at Neuengamme in Hamburg by the end of that year. On 30 November 1944, Harder became an SS-Hauptscharführer and a commander (Schutzhaftlagerführer) at the Ahlem camp in Hanover. On 30 January 1945, he was promoted to SS-Untersturmführer (equivalent second lieutenant). He also served as a camp commander in Uelzen, a subcamp of Neuengamme, which was evacuated under his leadership on 16–17 April due to British attacks, in which prisoners were transferred to the main camp. In May 1945, he was captured by the British military and was taken to Iserbrook. Due to health issues, he was initially released, but was arrested again.

After World War II, Harder was tried for war crimes by the British military court at the Curio house in Rotherbaum. On 6 May 1947, he was sentenced to 15 years' imprisonment. After the trial, Hamburger SV excluded him for a short time. However, his sentence was later reduced to ten years in prison, of which he ended up serving only four years. He was released from Werl Prison before Christmas 1951. Harder later moved to Bendestorf, where he worked as an insurance agent until his death on 4 March 1956 in Hamburg.

=== The Resistance Man and the Football Hero ===
In his 2023 book, The Resistance Man and the Football Hero by Frank Krake, the author contrasts the life of SS camp commandant Harder who "created a living hell" (according to Henry Kissinger, one of the US 84th Division which liberated the Ahlem concentration camp), with the life of Gerhard Nijland, a Dutch resistance hero who became a prisoner in Harder's camp. According to The Times, Nijland was captured after his resistance cell raided the De Nederlandsche Bank which was run by a Dutch Nazi and collaborator. (The raid had been approved by the Dutch Government in exile). Sent to Harder's camp at Ahlem, Nijland was a forced labourer alongside Jewish slave workers. Nijland died in April 1945 five days after being liberated by the Americans, and was buried in an unmarked grave.

== Death ==
Harder died in a hospital in Hamburg after surgery in 1956. The Hamburger SV published an obituary

Er war (...) stets ein guter Freund und treuer Kamerad.

— Vereinsnachrichten des Hamburger Sport-Verein, April 1956

'He was (...) always a good friend and loyal comrade.'

For the 1974 FIFA World Cup, the senate of Hamburg published the booklet Hamburg '74. Fußballweltmeisterschaft, which praised among others Josef Posipal, Uwe Seeler and Harder as role models for the young. The sheets mentioning Harder were removed.

== Style of play ==
When Harder had the ball at his feet and off he went racing, he would plough through defenders. Then he took his measurements again and while the opposing goalkeeper stood there, pale and helpless, knowing that he could not do anything to stop the shot that was coming. The ball was already in the corner of the goal.

Despite being the height he was in 1918 (1.90m) Harder was quick on his heels, out-pacing defenders and leaving him through on goal, scoring regularly. In 1918, he ran 100m in just over 11 seconds.

== Career statistics ==
=== Club ===
Appearances and goals by club, season, and competition. Only official games are included in this table.
Club	Season	Regional Championship		Northern Germany		German Championship		North German Cup		Total	
Club	Season	Apps	Goals	Apps	Goals	Apps	Goals	Apps	Goals	Apps	Goals
Eintracht Braunschweig	1909–10	0	0	0	0	0	0	0	0	0	0
Eintracht Braunschweig	1910–11	0	0	0	0	0	0	0	0	0	0
Eintracht Braunschweig	1911–12	0	0	2+	2+	0	0	0	0	2+	2+
Eintracht Braunschweig	1912–13	0	0	1+	1+	0	0	0	0	1+	1+
Hamburger SV	1912	0	0	0	0	0	0	0	0	0	0
Hamburger SV	1913–14	11+	16+	0	0	0	0	0	0	11+	16+
Hamburger SV	1914–15	1+	2+	0	0	0	0	0	0	1+	2+
Hamburger SV	1915–16	0	0	0	0	0	0	0	0	0	0
Hamburger SV	1916–17	0	0	0	0	0	0	0	0	0	0
Hamburger SV	1917–18	0	0	0	0	0	0	0	0	0	0
Hamburger SV	1918–19	3+	5+	1+	2+	0	0	0	0	4+	7+
Hamburger SV	1919–20	16	26	0	0	0	0	0	0	16	26
Hamburger SV	1920–21	17	28	2	3	1	0	0	0	20	31
Hamburger SV	1921–22	8	12	5	7	4	3	0	0	17	22
Hamburger SV	1922–23	13	45	4	1	3	5	0	0	20	51
Hamburger SV	1923–24	14	28	5	11	2	0	0	0	21	39
Hamburger SV	1924–25	14	27	6	10	1	1	3	9	24	47
Hamburger SV	1925–26	12	26	4	10	3	6	0	0	19	42
Hamburger SV	1926–27	14	34	6	9	2	4	3	6	25	53
Hamburger SV	1927–28	15	42	4	7	3	7	0	0	22	56
Hamburger SV	1928–29	10	19	2	4	2	1	0	0	14	24
Hamburger SV	1929–30	2	0	0	0	0	0	0	0	2	0
Hamburger SV	1930–31	8	10	0	0	0	0	0	0	8	10
Hamburger SV	Total	158	321	39	63	22	27	6	15	225	426
Victoria Hamburg	1931–32	7+	9+	0	0	0	0	0	0	7+	9+
Victoria Hamburg	1932–33	0	0	0	0	0	0	0	0	0	0
Victoria Hamburg	1933–34	0	0	0	0	0	0	0	0	0	0
Total		165	330	42	66	21	27	6	15	234	438

=== International ===
Scores and results list Germany's goal tally first, score column indicates score after each Harder goal.

List of international goals scored by Otto Harder
No.	Date	Venue	Opponent	Score	Result	Competition
1	5 April 1914	Oude Stadion, Amsterdam, Netherlands	Netherlands	3–1	4–4	Friendly
2	4 November 1923	Stadion Hoheluft, Hamburg, Germany	Norway	1–0	1–0	Friendly
3	31 August 1924	Deutsches Stadion, Berlin, Germany	Sweden	1–1	1–4	Friendly
4	21 September 1924	Üllői út, Budapest, Hungary	Hungary	1–3	1–4	Friendly
5	14 December 1924	Platz des Stuttgarter Sportclub, Stuttgart, Germany	Switzerland	1–1	1–1	Friendly
6	25 October 1925	Stadion Rankhof, Basel, Switzerland	Switzerland	1–0	4–0	Friendly
7	25 October 1925	Stadion Rankhof, Basel, Switzerland	Switzerland	2–0	4–0	Friendly
8	25 October 1925	Stadion Rankhof, Basel, Switzerland	Switzerland	3–0	4–0	Friendly
9	18 April 1926	Rheinstadion, Düsseldorf, Germany	Netherlands	3–2	4–2	Friendly
10	20 June 1929	Stadion im Zerzabelshof, Nuremberg, Germany	Sweden	1–0	3–3	Friendly
11	20 June 1929	Stadion im Zerzabelshof, Nuremberg, Germany	Sweden	2–2	3–3	Friendly
12	20 June 1929	Stadion im Zerzabelshof, Nuremberg, Germany	Sweden	3–2	3–3	Friendly
13	31 October 1929	Oude Stadion, Amsterdam, Netherlands	Netherlands	2–1	3–2	Friendly
14	31 October 1929	Oude Stadion, Amsterdam, Netherlands	Netherlands	3–1	3–2	Friendly

== Honours ==
Eintracht Braunschweig

- Duchy/Free State of Brunswick championship: 1909–10, 1910–11, 1911–12, 1912–13
- Northern German championship: 1912–13

Hamburger SV

- Hamburg Championship: 1918–19, 1922–23, 1923–24, 1924–25, 1925–26, 1926–27, 1927–28, 1929–30, 1930–31
- Northern German champions: 1921, 1922, 1923, 1924, 1925, 1928, 1929, 1931.
- German champion: 1922, 1923, 1928
- North German Cup: 1926
