= 1902 Austria v Hungary football match =

Austria	Hungary
(Austria)	(Hungary)
5	0
- Date: 12 October 1902
- Venue: Wiener A.C. Platz, Vienna
- Referee: Roland Shires (England)
- Attendance: 500

The 1902 Austria v Hungary football match was a football match held on 12 October 1902 between Austria and Hungary. The match was played at the ground of Wiener AC, a stone's throw from the modern Ernst-Happel-Stadion, and it ended in a 5–0 win for the hosts.

== Historical context ==
This match marked the official debut of the Austrian and Hungarian national football teams and it was also the first international match involving two non-British European teams. It was the first official international football game in continental Europe, and only the second official international match played outside the British Isles after a game between Argentina and Uruguay in July 1902.

Although the teams were representing Vienna and Budapest, the capitals of their respective country, both sides consider this their official international debut.

== Summary ==
Josef Taurer was the author of the very first goal in non-British international football when he put the Austrians ahead in the 5th minute. Five minutes later Johann "Jan" Studnicka doubled the lead and Gustav Huber added a third before the break. The second half was also dominated by Austria, which scored two more goals to seal a 5–0 win, both netted by Studnicka who thus completed his hat-trick.

== The match ==
12 October 1902

Austria	5–0	Hungary
Taurer 5'; Studnicka 10', ?', ?'; Huber 34'	Report

Stade du Vivier d'Oie, Uccle, Belgium
Attendance: 500
Referee: Roland Shires (England)

Austria
Hungary

Squad :
GK Philipp Nauß
BK Wilhelm Eipeldauer
BK Emil Wachuda (c)
HW Felix Hültel
HC Dominik Blässy
HW Raimund Mössmer
FW Hugo Wiesner
FW Gustav Huber
FW Engelbert Schrammel
FW Jan Studnicka
FW Josef Taurer

Positions

- GK = Goalkeeper
- BK = Back
- HW = Half-winger
- HC = Half-center
- FW = Forward

Squad :
GK Gyula Bádonyi
BK József Berán
BK Emil Gabrovitz
HW József Koltai
HC Imre Pozsonyi
HW Jenő Bayer
FW István Buda
FW Bertalan Steiner
FW József Pokorny
FW Alfréd Hajós (c)
FW Károly Oláh

== Post-match ==
A few months later, Hungary faced Bohemia on 5 April 1903, which was the second official international football game in continental Europe.

== See also ==
- Austria–Hungary football rivalry
- List of first association football internationals per country
- Austria national football team
- Hungary national football team
- History of the Hungary national football team
