= List of Hungarian sportspeople =

This is a partial list of Hungarian sportspeople. For the full plain list of Hungarian sportspeople on Wikipedia, see Category:Hungarian sportspeople.

== Athletics ==
- Rudolf Bauer
- Ibolya Csák
- József Csermák
- Nándor Dáni
- Lajos Gönczy
- Olga Gyarmati
- Gyula Kellner
- Antal Kiss
- Balázs Kiss
- Jolán Kleiber-Kontsek
- József Kovács
- Zoltán Kővágó
- Gergely Kulcsár
- Anita Márton
- Angéla Németh
- Imre Németh
- Miklós Németh
- Krisztián Pars
- Sándor Rozsnyói
- Márta Rudas
- Elemér Somfay
- István Somodi
- Béla Szepes
- Alajos Szokolyi
- Annamária Tóth
- Gyula Zsivótzky

== Boxing ==
- Zoltán Béres
- István Kovács
- György Mizsei
- László Papp

== Canoeing ==
- Attila Ábrahám
- Attila Adrovicz
- Ferenc Csipes
- Kinga Czigány
- Rudolf Dombi
- Éva Dónusz
- Natasa Dusev-Janics
- Krisztina Fazekas Zur
- László Fidel
- Zsolt Gyulay
- Csaba Horváth
- Gábor Horváth
- Zoltán Kammerer
- Rita Kőbán
- Roland Kökény
- György Kolonics
- Katalin Kovács
- Danuta Kozák
- Tamás Kulifai
- Erika Mészáros
- Dániel Pauman
- Imre Pulai
- András Rajna
- Botond Storcz
- Gabriella Szabó
- Dávid Tóth
- György Zala

== Equestrian ==
- József von Platthy

== Fencing ==
- Péter Abay
- Peter Bakonyi (1933–1997)
- Imre Bujdosó
- Dezső Földes
- Jenő Fuchs
- Oszkár Gerde
- Ferenc Hegedűs
- Géza Imre
- Ernő Kolczonay
- Iván Kovács
- Csaba Köves
- Krisztián Kulcsár
- Tímea Nagy
- József Navarrete
- György Nébald
- Bence Szabó
- Gyöngyi Szalay-Horváth
- Áron Szilágyi
- Péter Tóth
- Gábor Totola
- Ildikó Újlaky-Rejtő
- Lajos Werkner

== Figure skating ==
- Andrea Kékesy
- Ede Király
- László Nagy
- Marianna Nagy
- Krisztina Regőczy
- Emília Rotter
- András Sallay
- László Szollás

== Football ==
- Tibor Bábik
- Gyula Bádonyi
- Endre Bajúsz
- Tibor Baranyai
- József Braun
- Gábor Brlázs
- József Bujáki
- László Cseke
- Richárd Csepregi
- Domenico D'Alberto
- Attila Dorogi
- Balázs Dzsudzsák
- Tamás Filó
- Emil Gabrovitz
- Tamás Györök
- Ladislav Izsák
- Tibor Kalina
- Adolf Kertész (1892–1920)
- Gyula Kertész (1888–1982)
- Vilmos Kertész (1890–1962)
- Ádám Kisznyér
- Tamás Lapsánszki
- Péter Lelkes
- Dániel Lettrich
- László Megyesi
- Kálmán Menyhárt
- Ferenc Szilveszter
- Imre Taussig
- József Ursz
- Antal Vágó
- Viktor Valentényi

== Gymnastics ==
- Krisztián Berki
- Szilveszter Csollány
- Anikó Ducza-Jánosi
- Márta Egervári
- Vid Hidvégi
- Ágnes Keleti
- Margit Korondi
- Olga Lemhényi-Tass
- Katalin Makray
- Henrietta Ónodi
- Ferenc Pataki
- István Pelle

== Judo ==
- József Csák
- Éva Csernoviczki
- Imre Csösz
- Bertalan Hajtós
- Tibor Kincses
- Antal Kovács
- András Ozsvár
- József Tuncsik
- Miklós Ungvári

== Modern pentathlon ==
- Ádám Marosi
- János Martinek
- Attila Mizsér

== Rowing ==
- József Csermely
- Károly Levitzky
- Antal Melis
- Zoltán Melis
- György Sarlós
- Antal Szendey
- Róbert Zimonyi
- Béla Zsitnik

== Sailing ==
- Szabolcs Detre
- Zsolt Detre

== Swimming ==
- Péter Bernek
- Attila Czene
- László Cseh
- Ferenc Csik
- Tamás Darnyi
- Krisztina Egerszegi
- Márta Egerváry
- Károly Güttler
- Andrea Gyarmati
- Dániel Gyurta
- Gergely Gyurta
- Alfréd Hajós
- Olivér Halassy
- Zoltán Halmay
- Katinka Hosszú
- Zsuzsanna Jakabos
- Géza Kiss
- Ágnes Kovács
- Éva Risztov
- Norbert Rózsa
- Tünde Szabó
- Éva Székely
- Evelyn Verrasztó

== Tennis ==
- József Asbóth
- Tímea Babos
- Zsuzsa Körmöczy
- Ágnes Szávay
- Balázs Taróczy
- Andrea Temesvári

== Wrestling ==
- Péter Farkas
- Gábor Hatos
- Garry Kallos
- Tamás Lőrincz
- Péter Módos
- Attila Repka
- Richárd Weisz

== See also ==
- Sport in Hungary
- Hungary at the Olympics
- Hungary at the Paralympics
