= Cseke =

Cseke or Cséke is a Hungarian surname. Notable people with the surname include:

- Adalbert Dani von Gyarmata und Magyar-Cséke (1868–1921), Hungarian Army general
- Attila Cseke (born 1973), Romanian lawyer and politician
- Benjámin Cseke (born 1994), Hungarian footballer
- György Cséke (born 1983), Hungarian footballer
- László Cseke (born 1975), Hungarian footballer
