= Grand Hotel Aranybika =

Hotel in Debrecen, Hungary

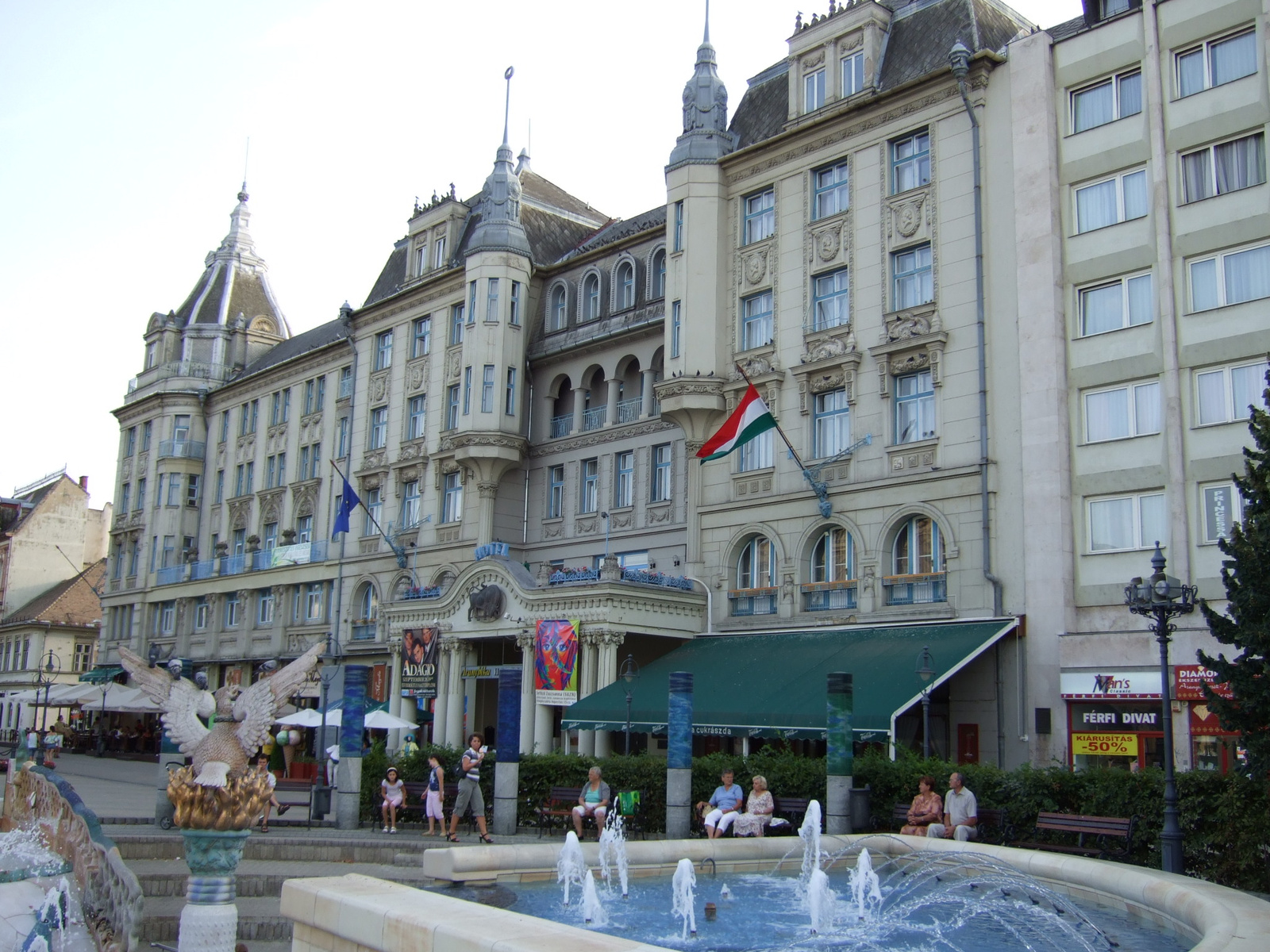
- Interactive map of the Grand Hotel Aranybika area
- Etymology: Trade-sign depicting a bull

General information
- Architectural style: Art Nouveau
- Location: 11–15 Piac Street, Debrecen, Hungary
- Coordinates: 47°31′49.80″N 21°37′26.30″E
- Renovated: 2013–2015

Design and construction
- Architect: Alfréd Hajós

Other information
- Number of rooms: 205

Website
- Official website

Grand Hotel Aranybika is a four-star hotel in Debrecen, Hungary. Located in the city centre, its history dates back to the late 17th century, though the current building of the hotel was erected in 1915 according to the blueprints of Alfréd Hajós.

The hotel was bought by entrepreneur József Boros in 2013, subsequently a large-scale renovation with government and European Union subsidy began. The renovation is expected to finish in 2015.

== History ==
The history of the hotel goes back to 1690, when the city purchased the land and the related properties – including a stone building – of local farmer András Bika. This stone building was re-designed to a guest house, that included four guest rooms, an inn and an apartment for the innkeeper, and opened in 1699.

In the next century the place became so popular that in 1799 it had to be expanded with an additional floor and a ballroom; subsequently a trade-sign depicting a butting bull was put on the facade, hence the hotel's name – Aranybika, (Note: Hungarian pronunciation: [ˈɒrɒɲbikɒ]) literally Golden Bull. The hotel was rebuilt by the plans of Imre Steindl for 1882, and it already had a café and a restaurant as well. The new two-storey building became a centre of intellectual and social life in Debrecen.

As the building became gradually obsolete, it was replaced by a new one in 1915. Erected according to the plans of Alfréd Hajós, Hungary's first Olympic champion, the Art Nouveau style building had 192 rooms, new cafés, restaurants, spa, a theatre, and a ceremonial hall. In 1976 an additional wing was added to the building.

Today the hotel has 205 rooms; the old wing has 131 rooms while in the old wing there are 48 rooms, 10 studios, 12 apartments and 4 luxurious suites, offering a total of 500 beds.

== Notable guests ==
During its history, the hotel welcomed a number of renowned artists and politicians, among others István Széchenyi, Ferenc Deák. Miklós Wesselényi, Ferenc Kossuth, Zsigmond Móricz, Béla Miklós, István Vásáry, Imre Nagy, Magda Szabó, Bruno Kreisky and Helmut Kohl. It is also recorded, that General Józef Bem put up in the hotel during the Hungarian War of Independence in 1848–49.
