= History of the Hungary national football team =

The history of the Hungary national football team dates back to their first international appearance in 1912.

== History ==
Although Austria and Hungary were constituent countries of the dual monarchy known as the Austro-Hungarian Empire, they formed separate football associations and teams around the start of the 20th century.

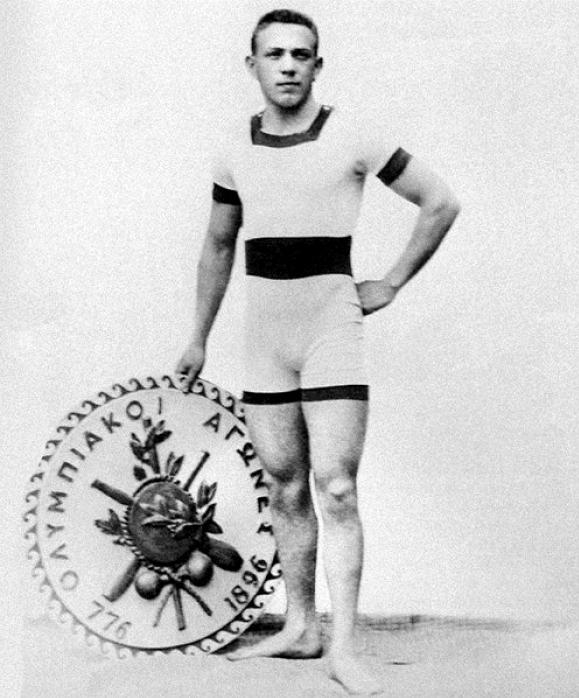
Alfréd Hajós, who won two gold medals in swimming in the first Olympic Games in 1896, was one of the first managers of the national team

== 1910s ==
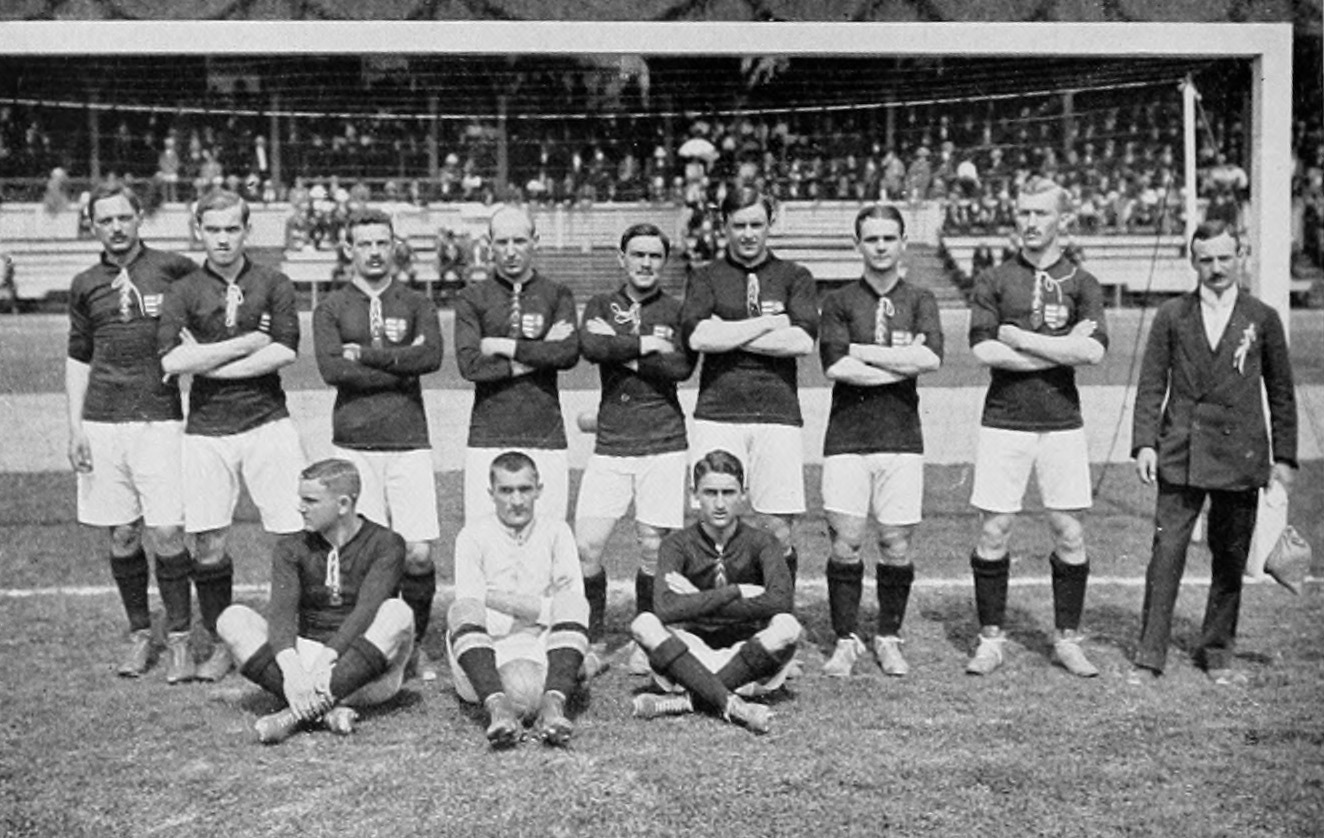
The Hungarian national team at the 1912 Summer Olympics

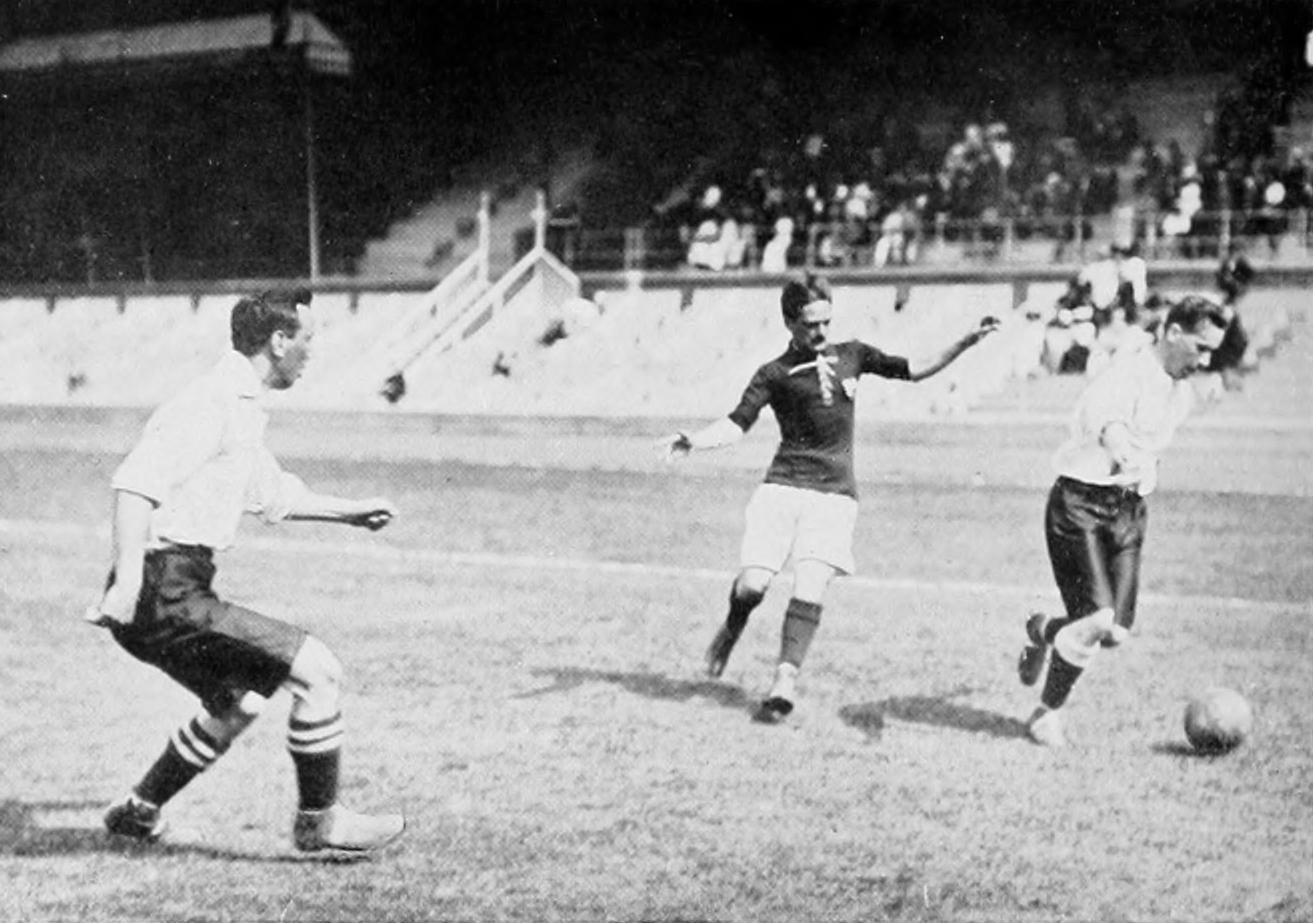
Hungary versus Great Britain at the 1912 Summer Olympics

The Hungary national football team first appeared at the Summer Olympic Games in 1912 in Stockholm, Sweden. The team had to ask for donations in order to be able to go to the games. Hungary played with England and lost 7–0 and thus were eliminated. After the Olympic Games Hungary played two matches against Russia in Moscow. The first match was won by 9–0 while the second 12–0 which is still a record of the national side. The top scorer of the two matches was Imre Schlosser who scored seven goals. The beginning of World War I had a deep impact on the thriving Hungarian football. Not only was the country suffering financial problems but the clubs were too. During World War I Hungary played Austria 16 times. In 1919 England claimed the exclusion of the Central Powers (including Hungary) from FIFA. Since FIFA refused England's plea, the British and the Irish associations (English, Scottish, Welsh) decided to resign from FIFA.

== 1920s ==
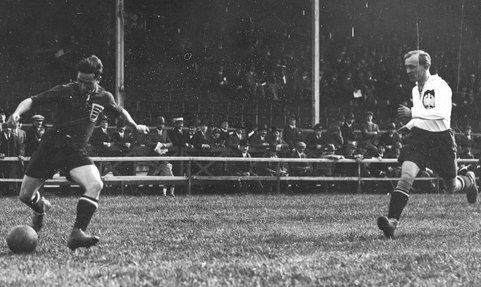
Poland-Hungary in 1924

Budapest was denied the opportunity to host the Summer Olympics in 1920, therefore it was held in Belgium. Moreover, the countries of the Central Powers (Germany, Austria-Hungary, Ottoman Empire and Bulgaria) were excluded from the Olympics. During this period the Fogl brothers (József Fogl and Károly Fogl) played in the national team. The formation the Hungarians used was 2–3–5 which was unique at that time. In 1924 the national team played at the Summer Olympics in Paris, France. In the first match Hungary beat Poland but in the second round they lost to Egypt. As a consequence, both the head coach and the head of the Hungarian Football Federation resigned. Between 1927 and 1930 Hungary participated in the Europa Cup, which is considered as the first international tournament, with Austria, Czechoslovakia, Switzerland, Italy and Yugoslavia. Hungary finished fourth although they had chance to win the tournament before the last game but they lost against Italy who went on to actually win it. On 12 June 1927 Hungary beat France by 13–1 which is still a record. József Takács scored six goals against France.fourth

== 1930s ==
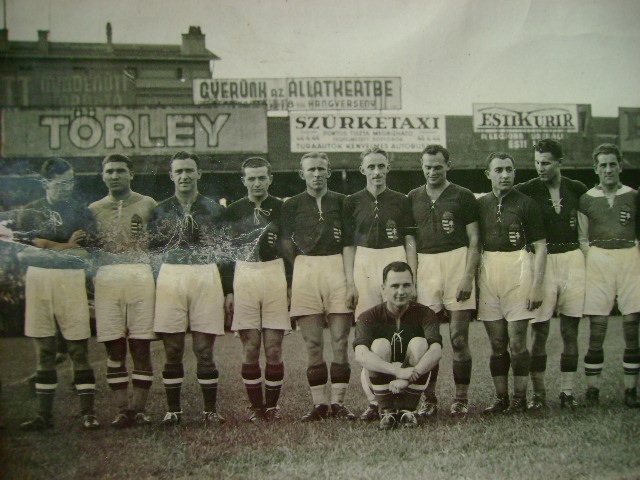
Hungary preparing for the 1938 FIFA World Cup

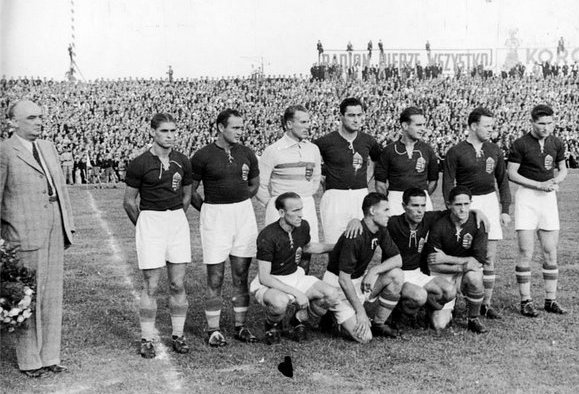
Poland-Hungary in 1939

The first World Cup was held in Uruguay in 1930. Hungary did not take part in the tournament since they were not invited and there were no qualification matches. Therefore, Hungary first appeared in the World Cup in Italy where the 1934 FIFA World Cup was held. Hungary's first World Cup match was played against Egypt on 27 May 1934, in the end the match was won 4–2. The goals were scored by Teleki, Toldi (2) and Vincze. In the quarter-finals Hungary faced neighbouring arch-rivals Austria and lost 2–1. The only Hungarian goal was scored by Sárosi.

Hungary entered the 1936 Olympics. In the first round they were eliminated by Poland 0 – 3.

The 1938 FIFA World Cup was held in France. The first match was played against Dutch East Indies and Hungary won 6–0. Sárosi and Zsengellér scored twice while Kohut and Toldi also scored a goal each. In the quarter-finals Hungary played with Switzerland and the match was won 2–0 thanks to a goal by Sárosi and Zsengellér each. The semi-finals at the Parc des Princes in Paris Hungary played against Sweden and won 5–1. Sas, Sárosi and Zsengellér's hat-trick sent them to the 1938 FIFA World Cup final. In the final Hungary faced Italy at the Stade Olympique de Colombes in Paris. The final result was 4–2 to Italy. The Hungarian goals were scored by Titkos and Sárosi.

== 1950s ==
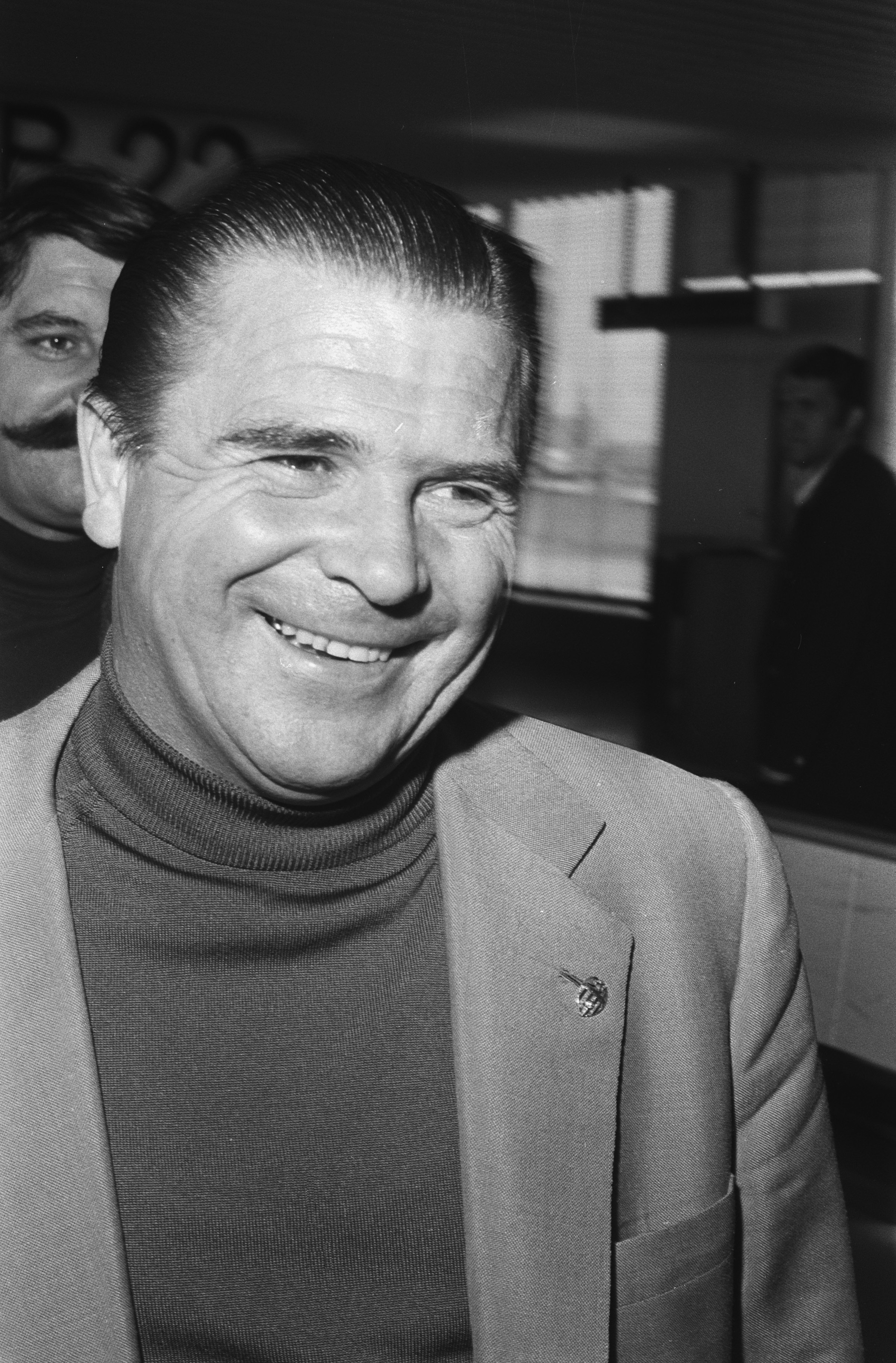
Ferenc Puskás, all-time top-scorer

This Hungarian team is regarded as one of the most influential sides in football history, noted for its role in shaping the development of the game. Built around strikers Ferenc Puskás and Sándor Kocsis, attacking half-back József Bozsik, and withdrawn striker Nándor Hidegkuti, the "Aranycsapat" ("Golden Team"), also known as the "Magnificent Magyars", drew widespread attention for a style of play grounded in tactical innovation. Excluding the 1954 World Cup Final, the team recorded 43 victories, 6 draws, and no defeats from 14 May 1950 until a 3–1 loss to Turkey on 19 February 1956.

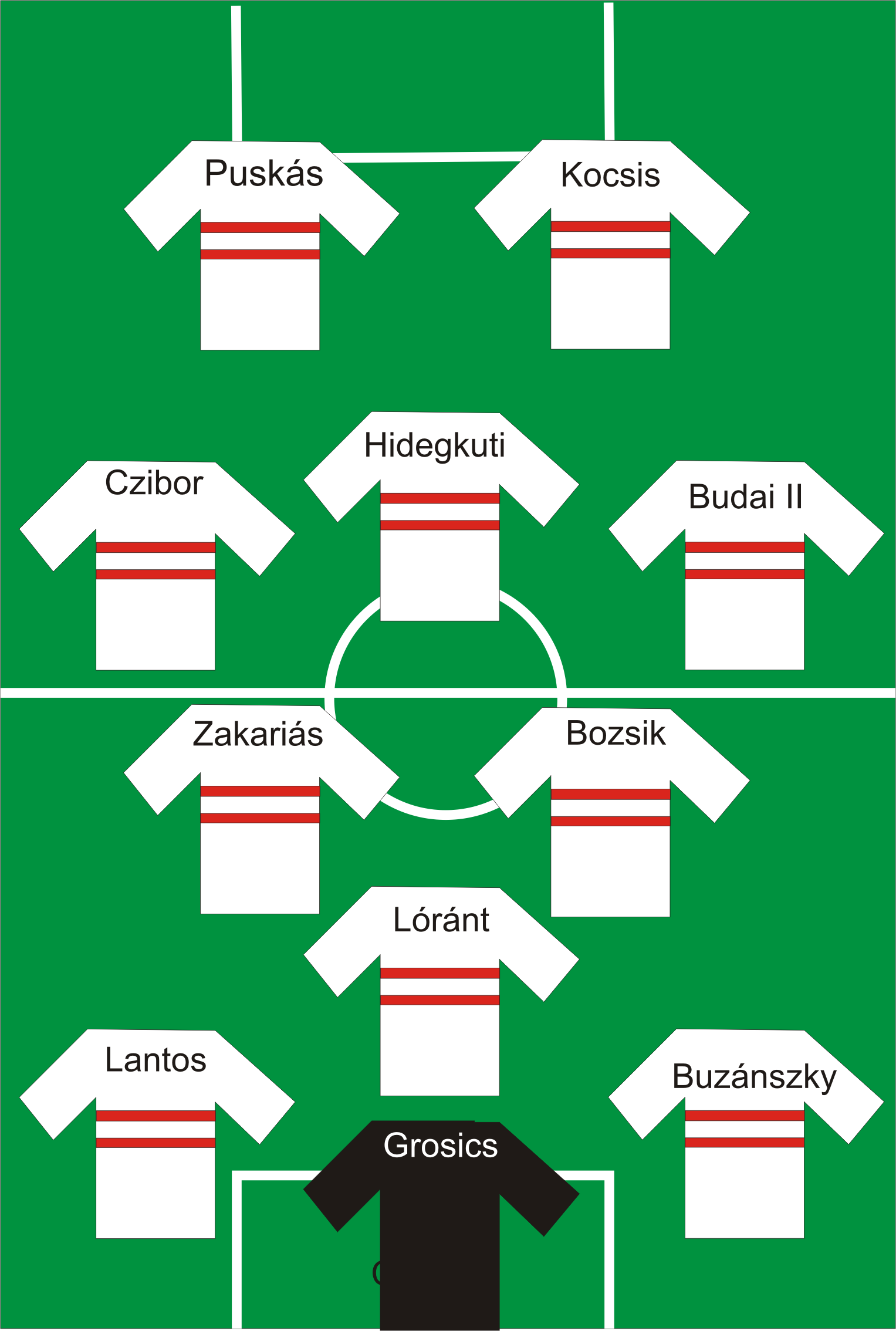
The formation of the Aranycsapat (Golden Team or Magical Magyars)

In the 1952 Summer Olympics that was held in Helsinki, Hungary beat Romania 2 – 1 thanks to a goal each from Czibor and Kocsis in the preliminary round. In the first round Hungary won 3 – 0 against Italy. In the quarter-finals Hungary beat Turkey easily 7 – 1. In the semi-finals Hungary faced Sweden, the 1948 Olympics champions and Hungary won 6 – 0. In the final Hungary beat Yugoslavia 2 – 0 by a goal each from Puskás and Czibor and thus won the Olympic title for the first time.

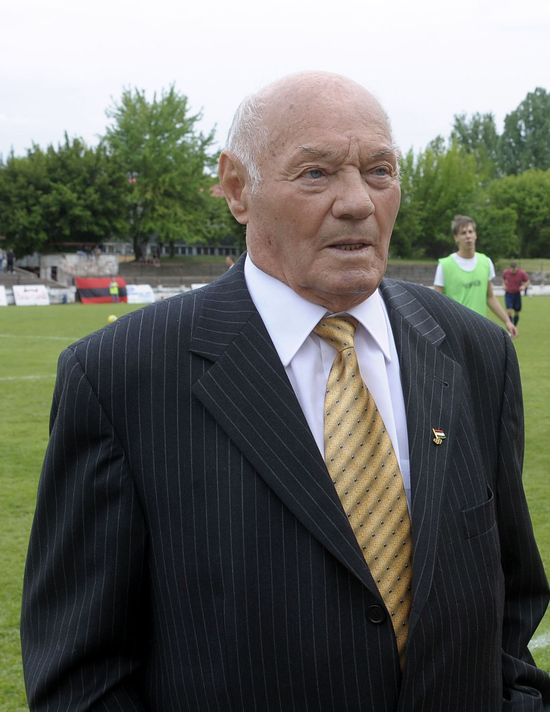
Jenő Buzánszky, was the last living member of the team who died 11 January 2015

On 25 November 1953 a match took place between England and Hungary at the Wembley Stadium, London, England, which would later be dubbed "the match of the century". The English team were unbeaten for 90 years at home. In front of 105,000 spectators Nándor Hidegkuti scored the first Hungarian goal in the first minute. In the first half the result was 4–2 to Hungary. The Hungarian goals were scored by Nándor Hidegkúti (1st, 22nd) and Ferenc Puskás (25th 29th). In the second half the Hungarians scored twice (Hidegkúti and József Bozsik) which resulted in the most important victory of the Hungarians in the twentieth century. The final result was 6–3. On 23 May 1954 the Hungarian national team beat England by 7–1, which remains their worst defeat to date, at the Puskás Ferenc Stadium. At that time in Hungary there was a saying about the match which is the following: Az angolok egy hétre jöttek és 7:1-re mentek in English: The English came for a (one) week (seven days) and went home with seven (7) one (1) (the result of the match).

The 1954 FIFA World Cup was held in Switzerland. The first match was played against South Korea and Hungary won by 9–0 at the Hardturm in Zürich. In the second group match Hungary played against West Germany and won the match by 8–3 at the St. Jakob Stadium in Basel. In the quarter-finals Hungary beat Brazil 4–2 at the Wankdorf Stadium in Bern. In the semi-finals Hungary played with the two-times World Cup winner Uruguay in Lausanne. Hungary won by 4–2 after extra time. In the final Hungary faced with West Germany again. Although Hungary won the group match against the Germans, they lost 3–2 in the final in Bern at the Wankdorf Stadium. The Golden Team, built around the legendary Ferenc Puskás, led early 2–0, but ended up 2–3 in a game the Germans subsequently christened "The Miracle of Bern".

In 2010 Journalist Erik Eggers speculates in a study that the Germany team may have used drugs to beat the Hungarian team, which were considered invincible at that time.

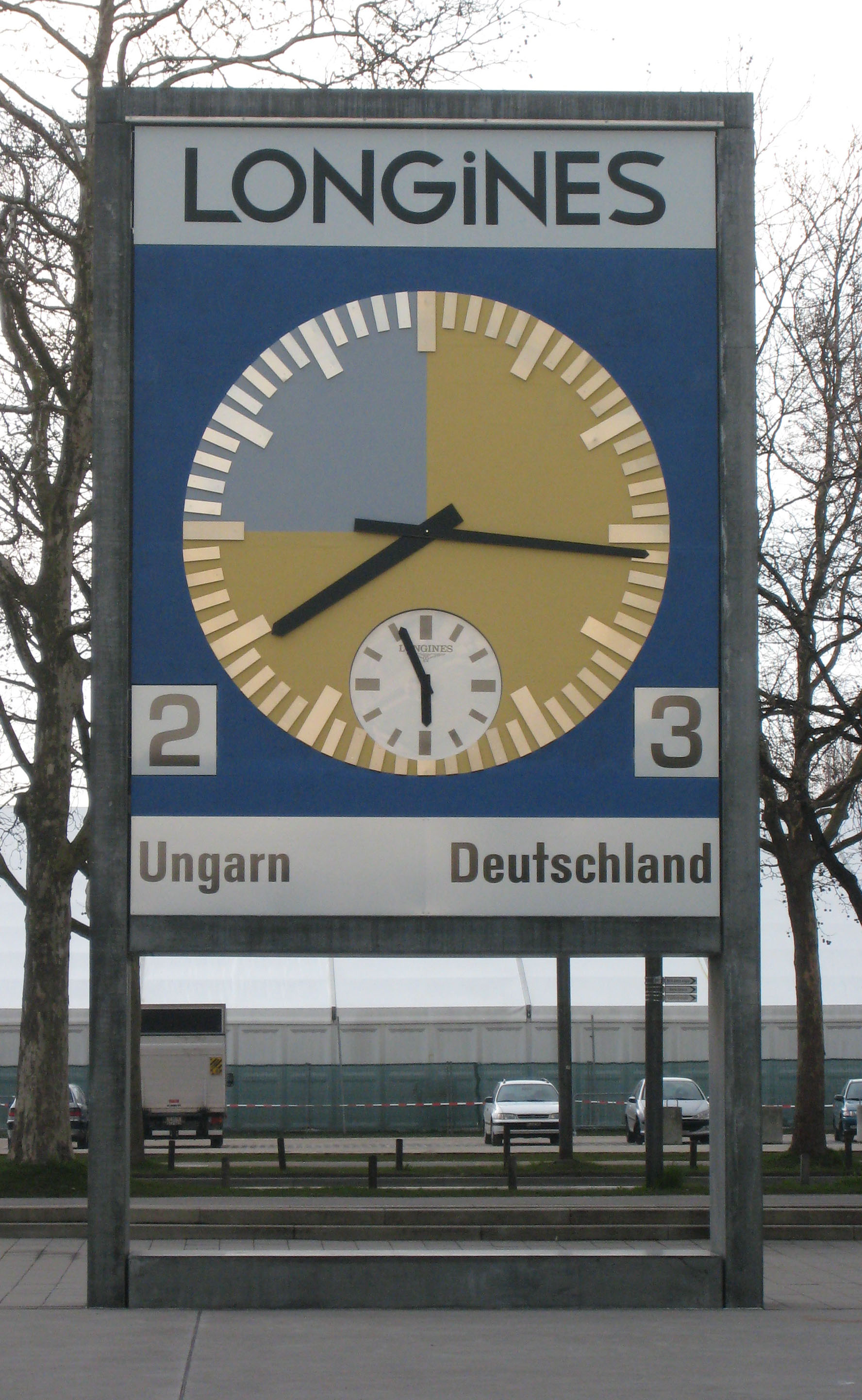
The restored match clock has been installed in front of the Stade de Suisse as a memorial.

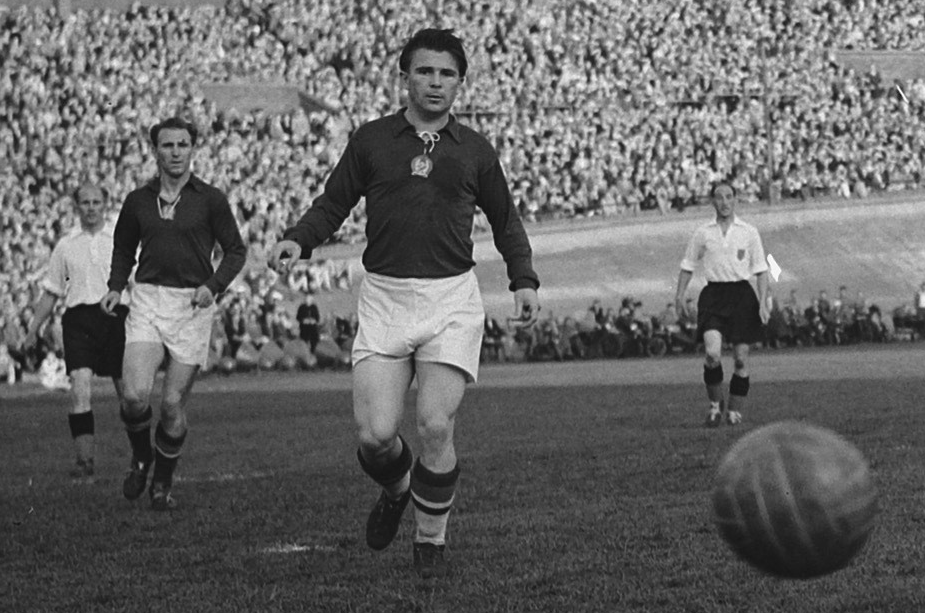
Puskás with Hidegkuti in 1954 in Budapest

Although Hungary is qualified as the defending champions for 1956 Olympics, they did not enter the tournament.

Hungary qualified for the 1958 FIFA World Cup which was held in Sweden. Hungary played their first match against Wales at the Jarnvallen stadium in Sandviken and the final result was 1–1. The second group match was played against the host country, Sweden. Hungary lost 2–1 in the Råsunda Stadium, Solna. Although Hungary won their last group match against Mexico at the Jarnvallen stadium in Sandvinken, they were eliminated from the World Cup after losing a play-off to Wales, who they had drawn level with on points. The Welsh had managed to draw all the group games and then beat the once-mighty Hungarians in a play-off match to decide which nation should follow Sweden into the knock-out stage. Had goal difference been the decider, Hungary would have gone through, as the Hungarians had a goal ratio 6–3 compared to 2–2 of Wales. As it was, Wales instead meet Brazil in the quarterfinals and became the recipient of young Pelé's first World Cup goal.

== 1960s ==
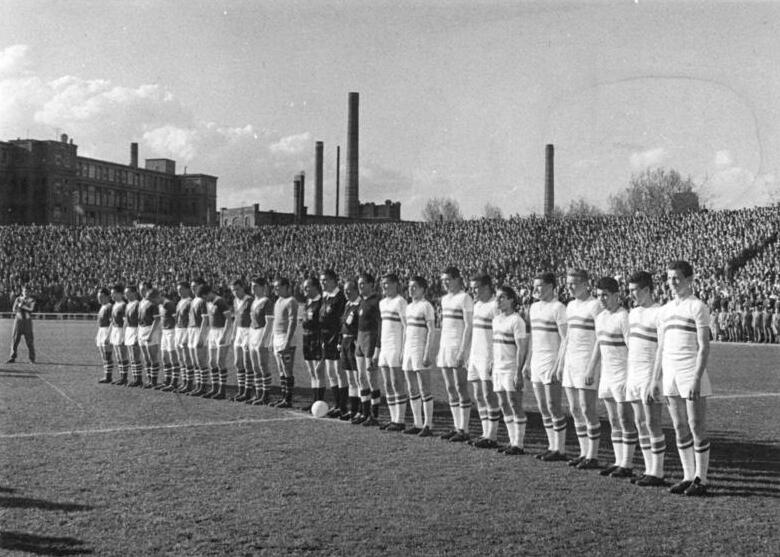
Hungary-East Germany 0–2 in Budapest

In 1960 Hungary again entered the Olympics held in Italy and was drawn into Group D with France, Peru and India. Hungary finished top of the group with all wins and a goal difference of +12. In the semi-finals they lost to Denmark 0 – 2, but beat Italy in the Bronze medal match 2 – 1 thanks to a goal each from Orosz and Dunai and thus won a bronze medal.

Hungary qualified for the 1962 FIFA World Cup which was held in Chile. On 31 May 1962 in the first group match Hungary beat England by 2–1 thanks to the goals of Tichy and Albert at the El Teniente stadium in Rancagua in front of 7938 spectators. The second match on 3 June 1962 was even more convincing against the Bulgarian national side. The match was won by 6–1 in Rancagua. The last group match was against Argentina on 6 June 1962 and the final result was a goalless draw in front of 7945 spectators in Rancagua. Hungary qualified for the quarter-finals by gaining 5 points and winning the group. In the quarter-finals of the World Cup Hungary was eliminated by Czechoslovakia by 1–0 at the El Teniente stadium in Rancagua in front of 11690 spectators.

In 1964 Hungary again qualified for the 1964 Olympics held in Tokyo and was drawn into Group B with defending champions Yugoslavia, Morocco and North Korea, who withdrew. In their first match against Morocco Hungary won 6 – 0 with all 6 goals scored by Ferenc Bene. In their second match Hungary won narrowly with a 6 – 5 against Yugoslavia and advanced into the next round along with runners-up Yugoslavia. In the quarter-finals Hungary beat Romania 2 – 0 with goals from Csernai. In the semi-finals Hungary beat United Arab Republic (Egypt) 6 – 0 with 4 goals from Bene and 2 from Komora. In the finals Hungary beat Czechoslovakia 2 – 1 thanks from an own goal by Weiss and a goal by Bene, thus won their second gold medal.

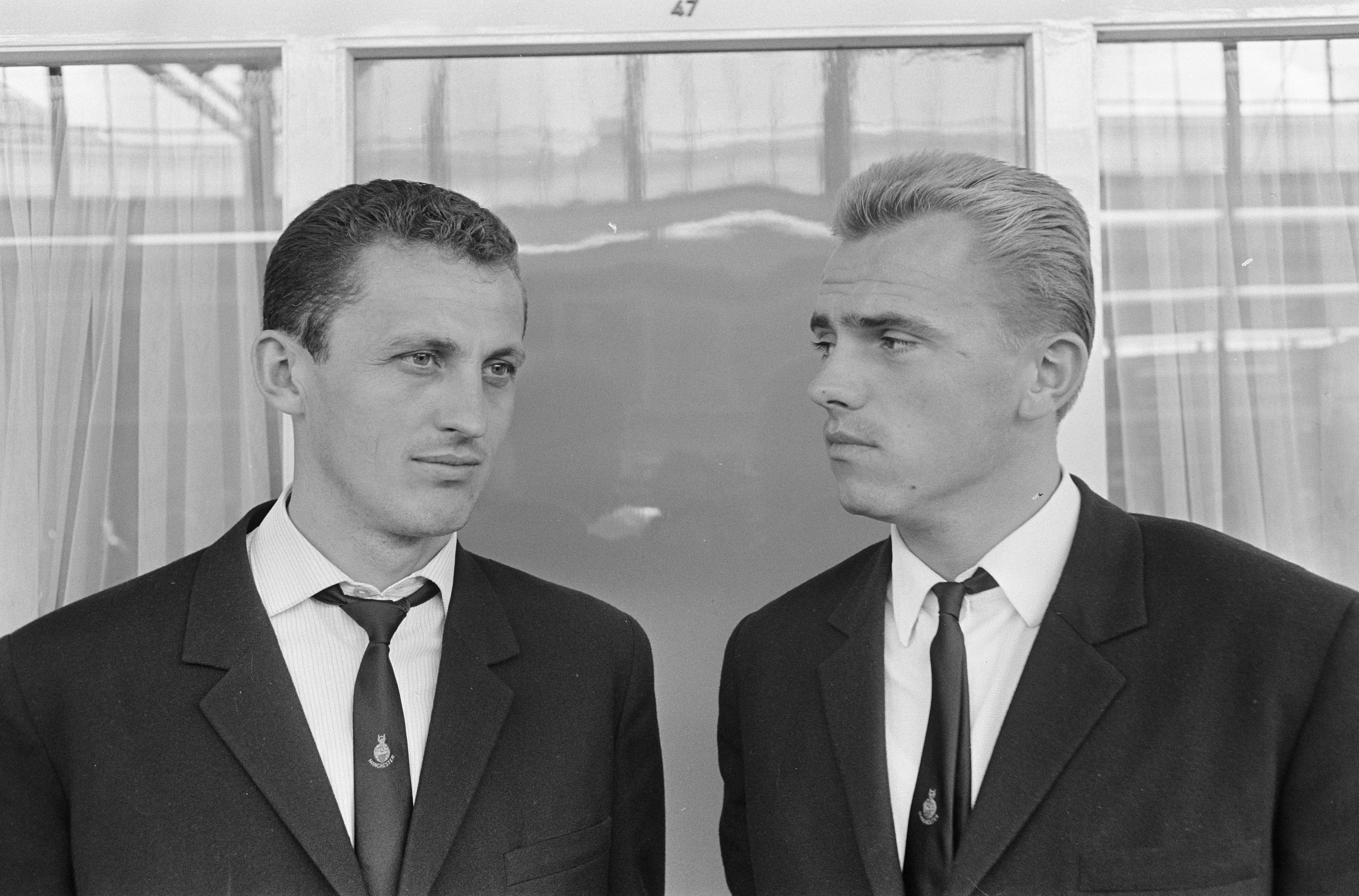
Flórián Albert and Kálmán Mészöly

Hungary qualified for the 1964 European Nations' Cup which was organised in Spain. Hungary played against Spain in the semi-finals of the tournament. The final result was 2–1 after extra time. The only Hungarian goal was scored by Ferenc Bene. In the third place play-off Hungary beat Denmark 3–1 after extra time. Dezső Novák scored twice in the extra time. Hungary also managed to qualify for the 1966 FIFA World Cup which was held in the home of football, England. On 13 July 1966 Hungary lost their first group match against Eusébio's Portugal by 3–1 at the Old Trafford Stadium in Manchester. Two days later in the second group match Hungary beat Brazil thanks to the goals of Bene, Farkas and Mészöly in the Goodison Park in Liverpool. In the last round of the group matches on 20 July 1966 Hungary beat Bulgaria by 3–1. The goals were scored by Mészöly and Bene. Hungary finished second in the group and qualified for the quarter-finals. In the quarter-finals Hungary were eliminated by the Soviet Union on 23 July 1966 by 2–1 at the Roker Park in Sunderland in front of 26844 spectators.

In 1968 Olympics Hungary qualified as defending champions to defend their title and was drawn into Group C with Israel, Ghana and El Salvador. Hungary finished top and advanced into the next round with Israel. In Quarter-finals Hungary beat Guatemala narrowly with 1 – 0 from a goal by Szűcs. In the semi-finals they beat Japan 5 – 0 thanks to Szűcs with 3 goals and 2 from Novák. In the finals they beat Bulgaria 4 – 1 and won their third title, being the most successful team at the Olympics in football (Great Britain also won 3 titles but their first title is in 1904, and football became an official event in 1908).

Flórián Albert was named European Footballer of the Year in 1967. He was the most successful footballer of Ferencváros since the formation of the club, scoring 255 goals in 351 matches from 1958 to 1974.

== 1970s ==
Hungary came back again as long-time defending champions in the 1972 Olympics in Munich and was drawn into Group C with Denmark, Iran and Brazil. They finished top and advanced into the next round with Denmark. In their Second group round they were drawn into Group 1 with East Germany, West Germany and Mexico. They again finished top undefeated and advanced into the finals with East Germany. In the finals they faced Poland and lost 1 – 2. The only Hungarian goal was scored by Varady.

Hungary qualified for the finals of the UEFA Euro 1972 which was held in Belgium. In the semi-finals Hungary played with the Soviet Union and lost 1–0. In the third place play-off Hungary lost to Belgium 2–1. The only Hungarian goal was scored by Lajos Kű. Hungary finished fourth in the 1972 UEFA Euro.

Hungary participated in the 1978 FIFA World Cup which was held in Argentina. On 2 June 1978 at the Estadio Monumental in Buenos Aires Hungary played with Argentina. Although Károly Csapó scored an early goal, the home side won the match by 2–1. Hungary played their second group match against Italy and the Azzurri won by 3–1. Hungary's third match was played against Michel Platini's France and Hungary lost 3–1 which resulted the farewell of the national side.

== 1980s ==
During the 1980s Hungary qualified for the FIFA World Cup twice.

=== 1982 World Cup ===
The first group match of the 1982 FIFA World Cup in Spain was played against El Salvador and Hungary won by 10–1 at Estadio Nuevo in Elche. The goals were scored by Nyilasi (2), Pölöskei, Fazekas (2), Tóth, Kiss (3) and Szentes. In spite of the big victory, Hungary lost to 4–1 to Maradona's Argentina in the second match of the group stages. Maradona scored twice, while the only Hungarian goal was scored by Pölöskei at the Estadio José Rico Pérez in Alicante. Although Hungary drew in the last match against Belgium, they were eliminated from the World Cup. However, Hungary was leading in the first half thanks to a goal by Varga.

=== 1986 World Cup ===
Hungary's last World Cup appearance was the 1986 FIFA World Cup in Mexico. In the first match of the group Hungary lost 6–0 to the Soviet Union. Football experts date the crisis of the Hungarian football from this match. Although Hungary won their second match against Canada by 2–0 (the goals were scored by Esterházy and Détári), they lost to Platini's France 3–0 in the last group match. This has been the last World Cup appearance of the Hungarian national team.

Pos	Team	Pld	W	D	L	GF	GA	GD	Pts	Qualification
1	Soviet Union	3	2	1	0	9	1	+8	5	Advance to knockout stage
2	France	3	2	1	0	5	1	+4	5	Advance to knockout stage
3	Hungary	3	1	0	2	2	9	−7	2	
4	Canada	3	0	0	3	0	5	−5	0	

Source: FIFA

== 1990s ==
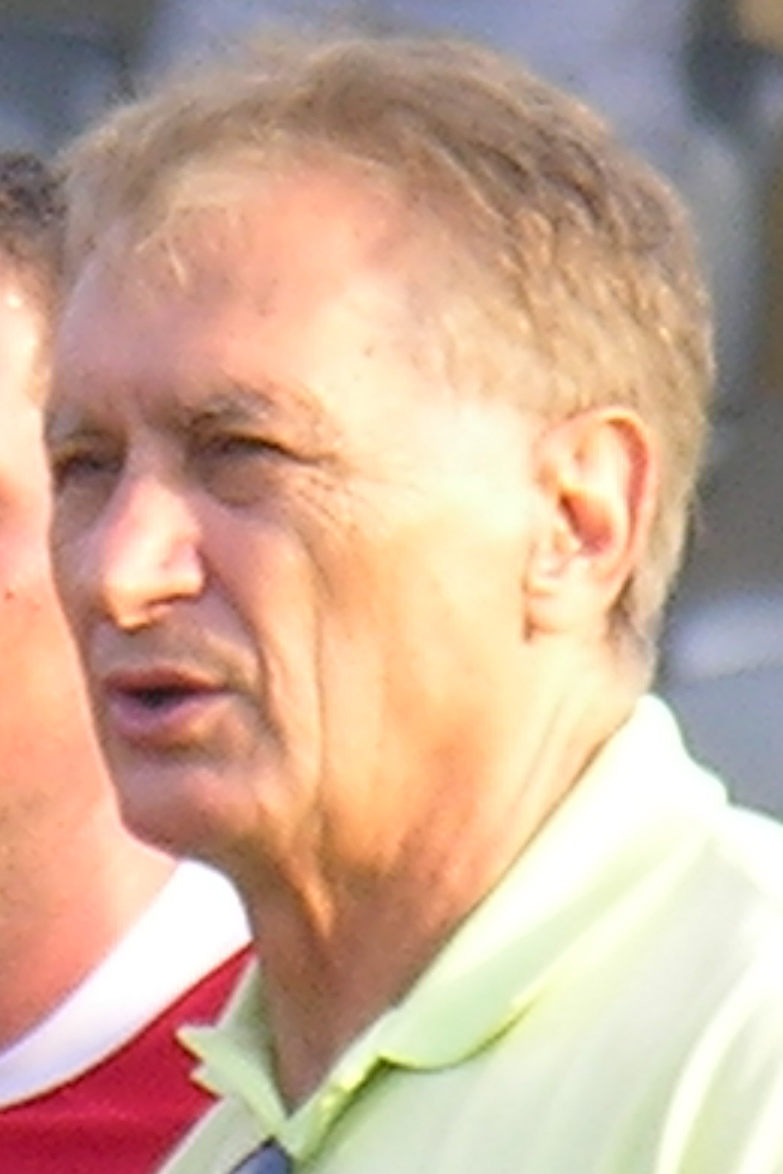
Antal Dunai's team qualified for the 1996 Summer Olympics

During the 1990s Hungary were not able to qualify for any international tournaments except for the 1996 Summer Olympics held in Atlanta, the United States. The 1980s were considered as the most bitter years of the Hungarian football, but the 1990s proved to be the worst. In 1996 Hungary reached its lowest FIFA ranking (87). The fall of the Communist regime caused financial problems to many Hungarian clubs. Formerly successful clubs like Ferencváros and Újpest faced financial crisis and bankruptcy. This had a profound effect on the Hungarian national team as well since earlier the biggest clubs from Budapest (Ferencváros, Újpest, Honvéd and MTK) produced the players for the national side. Another important reason for the decline can be attributed to the Bosman ruling. Since the Hungarian clubs lost the financial aid from the state in the early 1990s, they were not able to compete with the richer Western European clubs. The crisis in the Hungarian club football affected the performance of the national team.
The Hungarian legend Puskás was appointed as the head coach of the national side in 1993 in order to bring back earlier success. However, he led the team during only four matches. Consequently, the coaching of the former Honvéd and Real Madrid legend could not change anything. The only remarkable success in the 1990s was the qualification of the Hungarian national team for the 1996 Summer Olympics. Dunai's team played its first group match against Nigeria and lost to 1–0 in Orlando, in the United States. In the second group match Hungary played with Brazil and lost to 3–1. The only Hungarian goal was scored by Madar. The last group match was played against Japan. Hungary lost to 3–2. The Hungarian goals were scored by Madar and Sándor. Although the Olympic qualification of the young team was a big surprise and people thought that Hungary would have a better future in football history, the team never reached any similar success later.
In the 1990s Hungary were the closest to qualify for the 1998 FIFA World Cup but they were eliminated in the play-offs by FR Yugoslavia.

== 2000s ==
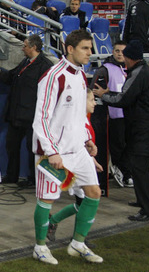
Zoltán Gera in national team in November 2011

The most talented players of the 2000s were Gera and Dárdai. Both played abroad (Gera in the Premier League for West Bromwich Albion F.C. and Fulham F.C., while Dárdai in the Bundesliga for Hertha BSC). However, other significant players did not emerge in order to form a strong national team which resulted the consecutive failures of the qualification for the international competitions in the 2000s. Hungary were unable to qualify for the UEFA Euro 2000, 2004, 2008 and for FIFA World Cup 2002, 2006, and 2010. Moreover, during the UEFA Euro 2008 qualification Hungary finished sixth in their group reaching their nadir in their football history. They even lost to Malta which resulted the resignation of Bozsik. Couple of days later Várhidi was appointed who was famous for his appearances in the Sport 1, Hungarian sport television, and analysing the Italian Serie A clubs. He proved his talent by beating the 2006 FIFA World Champions Italy by 3–1 at the Ferenc Puskás Stadium in a friendly tie. However, neither Bozsik nor Várhidi could do well in the official matches which resulted their removal.

The Hungarian Football Federation even tried out foreign coaches. Both Matthäus and Koeman failed to qualify for any tournaments.

In the 2000s only the Hungary U-20 team could bring back the emotions of the early years. Hungary won a bronze medal in the 2009 FIFA U-20 World Cup in Egypt. The new talents of the U-20 team were immediately signed by foreign clubs. Koman to Sampdoria, Németh to Liverpool, Simon to Palermo. However, the big question was whether they can develop enough to be able to play in the senior team.

== 2010s ==
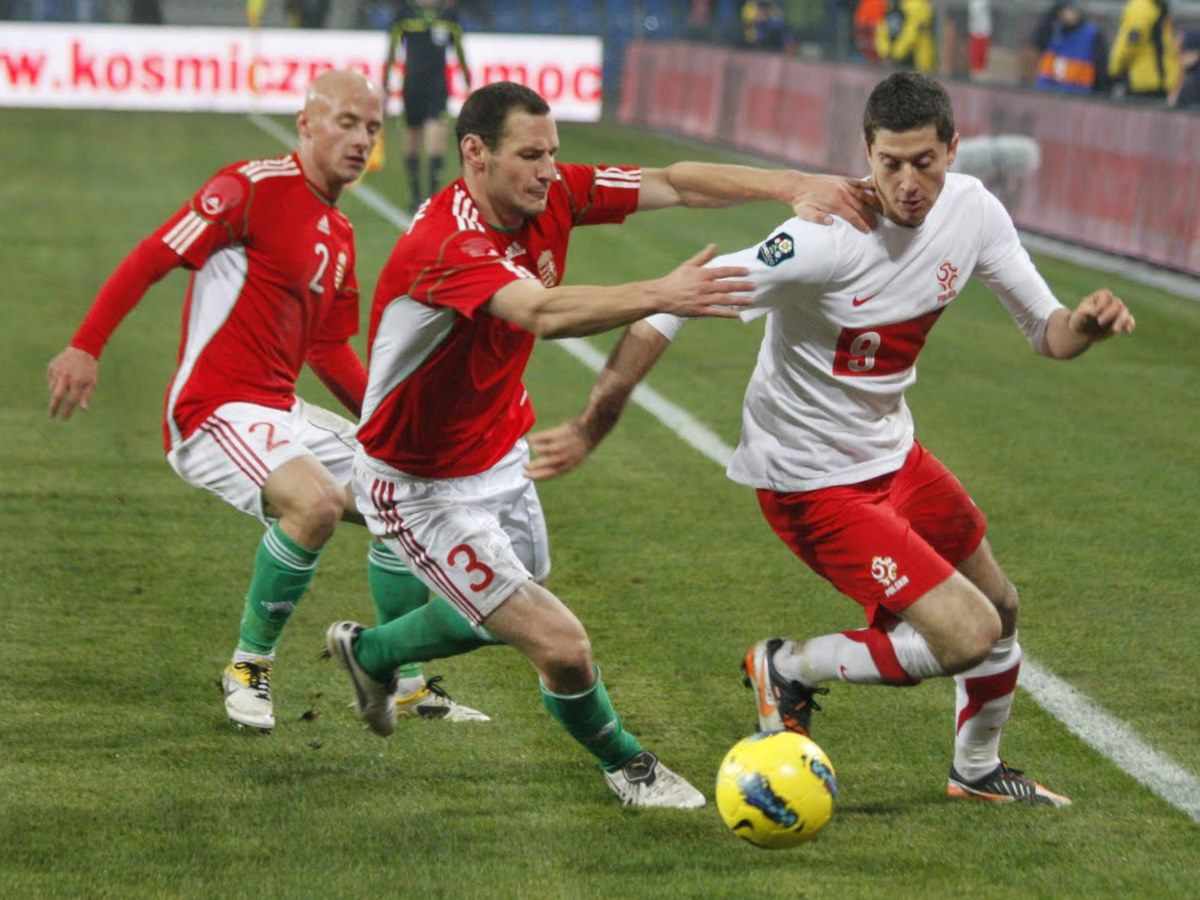
Varga, Vanczák and Lewandowski in a friendly tie against Poland on 15 November 2011

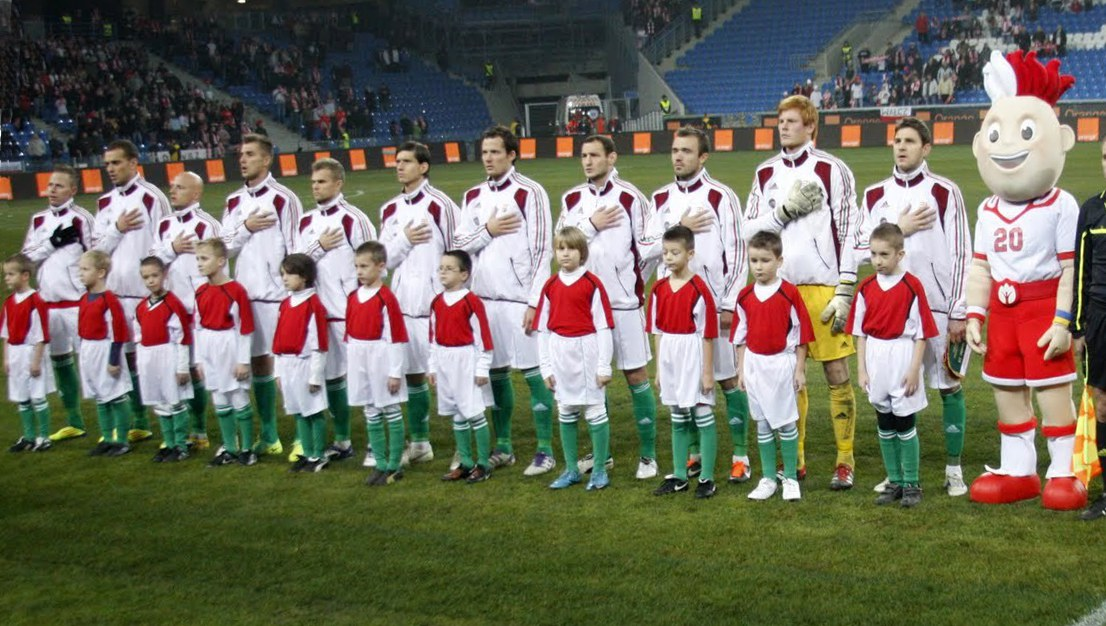
Hungary in a friendly tie against Poland on 15 November 2011 at the Stadion Miejski, Poznań, Poland. The line-up included Dzsudzsák, Juhász, Varga, Priskin, Koman, Laczkó, Tőzsér, Vanczák, Sándor, Bogdán, & Gera

=== Euro 2012 qualifying ===
In the Euro 2012 qualifying Hungary was drawn into Group E. On 3 September Hungary lost 2–0 to Sweden at the Råsunda Stadium, in Solna. In the second match Hungary beat Moldova by 2–1 at the Szusza Ferenc Stadium, Budapest. In the 50th Rudolf and in the 66th Koman scored. On 8 October 2010, Hungary scored eight goals against San Marino at the Pukás Ferenc Stadium. Szalai scored a hat-trick. On 12 October, after many years Hungary was able to win away against a team which was ranked ahead. Hungary beat Finland by 2–1 at the Olympic Stadium in Helsinki. Szalai's and Dzsudzsák's goal resulted the success. In the spring of 2011 Hungary played with World Cup 2010 finalist the Netherlands. At home Hungary was beaten by 4–0, while away 5–3. Although Gera scored twice and Rudolf once, Hungary was unable to win or draw at the Amsterdam Arena. On 7 June 2011 Hungary beat San Marino away by 3–0. On 2 September 2011, Egervári had to leave out the key people (Dzsudzsák, Juhász and Gera) from the national side due to injuries and suspension. In spite of the difficulties Hungary beat Sweden at home. Szabics scored against Sweden at the Puskás Ferenc Stadium in the last minutes of the first half. However, Sweden equalized in the second half. A late goal by Rudolf resulted the celebration of 25,000 spectators after beating Sweden by 2–1 at the Puskás Ferenc Stadium. On 6 September 2011, Hungary beat Moldova 2–0 at the Zimbru Stadium in Chişinău. An early goal by Vanczák in the 7th minute calmed down the national side and in the second half a goal by Rudolf secured the victory away in order to stay in the hunt for the play-offs of the Euro 2012 qualifiers. Since Hungary won the two matches in September 2011 there was still hope for the play-offs of the Euro 2012 qualifiers. In September 2011 Hungary reached its highest FIFA ranking in the team's history with the 27th position due to the victories over Sweden and Moldova in the qualifiers. In the penultimate round of the Euro 2012 qualifiers Sweden beat Finland away (2–1), as a consequence the last match was without any stake for the Hungary national side which left its mark on it. Hungary drew with Finland at home (0–0).

In the last two matches of the year 2011 Hungary played with Liechtenstein at home (the match was aimed as a commemoration of the recently deceased football legend Flórián Albert who was the only Hungarian football player who won the prize Ballon d'Or) and the Euro 2012 hosts Poland away. On 1 June 2012 in a friendly tier Hungary beat the Czech Republic by 2–1. Egervári invited Szakály, Mészáros and Gyurcsó for the first time. Gyurcsó was the first player from the Puskás Ferenc Academy and he contributed to the success by a late goal. Three days later Hungary drew with Ireland.

=== FIFA 2014 qualifying ===
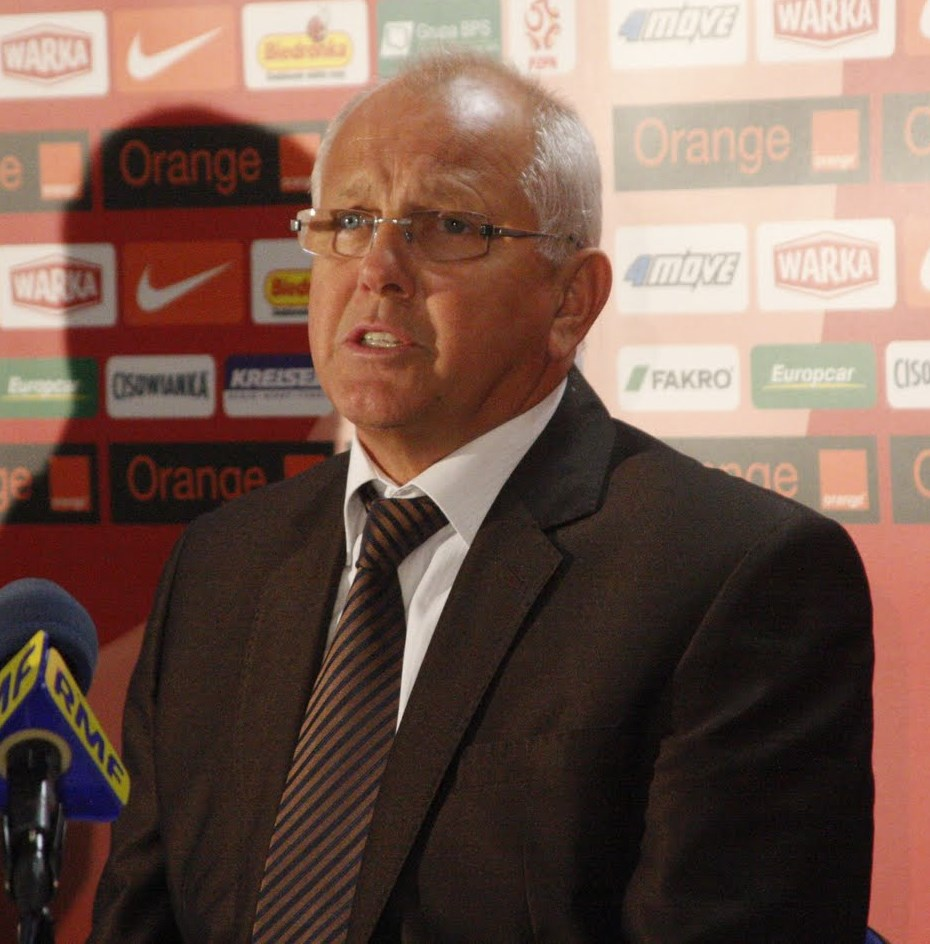
Sándor Egervári has been the most successful coach in the last 20 years

Hungary started the FIFA world cup 2014 qualifying campaign in group D along with the Netherlands, Turkey, Romania, Estonia and Andorra. Egervári, head coach of the national team, said in an interview with the FIFA that Netherlands are the favourites and the battle for the second place will be between Romania, Turkey and Hungary. On 7 September, Hungary started the FIFA world cup 2014 qualifying campaign with a 5–0 win over Andorra. Just four days later Hungary lost to the Netherlands at home 4–1. On 12 October Tamás Hajnal celebrated his 50th appearance in the national team with a goal against Estonia which resulted the 1–0 victory over the Baltic linguistic relatives in the FIFA world cup 2014 qualifiers. Four days later, on 16 October 2012 Hungary battle back to beat Turkey at home 3–1. In March 2013 Hungary played two crucial matches in their group. On 22 March 2013 Hungary drew with Romania at the empty Puskás Ferenc Stadium. Vanczák's header was equalized by Mutu's penalty, while Dzsudzsák's penalty was equalized by Chipciu's late goal finishing the match 2-2. and on 26 March 2013 Turkey hosted Hungary at the Şükrü Saracoğlu Stadium in Istanbul. Böde's equalizer secured a 1–1 draw in Turkey. Hungary prepared for their crucial autumnal FIFA qualifiers with a 1–1 draw against the Czech Republic at home and on 6 September 2013 Hungary lost 3–0 to Romania in Bucharest. Four days later Hungary beat Estonia 5–1 at home, On 11 October 2013 Hungary suffered an 8–1 record defeat at the Amsterdam Arena against the Netherlands, which resulted the resignation of Egervári. Therefore, on 14 October 2013 Csábi, caretaker, led the team against Andorra in a 2–0 victory.

=== Euro 2016 qualifying ===
Pos	Team	Pld	W	D	L	GF	GA	GD	Pts	Qualification	(Northern Ireland)	(Romania)	(Hungary)	(Finland)	(Faroe Islands)	(Greece)
1	Northern Ireland	10	6	3	1	16	8	+8	21	Qualify for final tournament	—	0–0	1–1	2–1	2–0	3–1
2	Romania	10	5	5	0	11	2	+9	20	Qualify for final tournament	2–0	—	1–1	1–1	1–0	0–0
3	Hungary	10	4	4	2	11	9	+2	16	Advance to play-offs	1–2	0–0	—	1–0	2–1	0–0
4	Finland	10	3	3	4	9	10	−1	12		1–1	0–2	0–1	—	1–0	1–1
5	Faroe Islands	10	2	0	8	6	17	−11	6 (Note: Head-to-head points: Faroe Islands 6, Greece 0.)		1–3	0–3	0–1	1–3	—	2–1
6	Greece	10	1	3	6	7	14	−7	6		0–2	0–1	4–3	0–1	0–1	—

Source: UEFA
Notes:

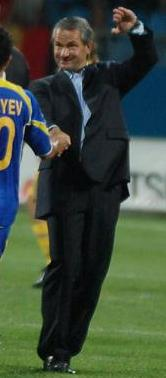
Bernd Storck led Hungary to the UEFA Euro 2016

Hungary were drawn in Group D in their FIFA World Cup 2014 qualifying, along with the Netherlands, Turkey, Romania, Estonia and Andorra. They had 14 points going into the penultimate round of games, but suffered a joint national record defeat 8–1 to the Netherlands, which resulted in the resignation of head coach Egervári. For their final group game, a 2–0 win against Andorra, Hungary were led by caretaker manager József Csábi. They finished in third place in the group, on seventeen points, missing out on qualification. After the match, striker Ádám Szalai gave a press conference delivering a poignant scathing monologue about his perception of "continuously lying to our supporters" when it came to suggesting that the team had a chance against current leading teams of the world. Similar sentiments have been expressed before by midfielder Szabolcs Huszti. During this period, a film crew began filming the team during both their preparations and matches; the film, Még 50 perc was eventually released in 2016 just before the European Championships.

Pintér was appointed as the head coach of the national team in December 2013. Some had seen this decision as controversial, given Pintér's low popularity with fans and players alike. The team played their first game at the newly constructed Groupama Arena on 7 September 2014, a 2–1 defeat to Northern Ireland in UEFA Euro 2016 qualifying. Pintér was subsequently dismissed, with Dárdai appointed as a temporary replacement for three matches. He turned down an offer to manage the team on a permanent basis, but was kept on. Subsequently, Pál Dardai was at Hertha BSC, where he had been passing youth coach, was promoted to manager of the first team, but he remained still coach. In the summer of 2015 he resigned as coach of the Hungarian national team to devote himself to his work as manager of Hertha BSC. He was eventually replaced by the German sports director of the Hungarian Football Association, Storck, in July 2015. Storck exercised incidentally continue from the post of Sports Director of the Association. On 15 November 2015, Storck-led Hungary qualified for the UEFA Euro 2016 after 44 years when Hungary was qualified for the UEFA Euro 1972. Hungary beat Norway in the first leg of the UEFA Euro 2016 qualifying play-offs 1–0. The only goal was scored by Kleinheisler. On the return match, Hungary beat Norway 2–1 and qualified for the UEFA Euro 2016 finals.

=== Euro 2016 ===
On 14 June 2016, Hungary won the first group match in a 2–0 victory over Austria at the UEFA Euro 2016 Group F match at Nouveau Stade de Bordeaux, Bordeaux, France. Three days later on 18 June 2016 Hungary drew (1–1) with Iceland at the Stade Vélodrome, Marseille. Hungary drew (3–3) with Portugal at the Parc Olympique Lyonnais, Lyon on 22 June 2016. Hungary qualified for the knock-out stage.

Pos	Team	Pld	W	D	L	GF	GA	GD	Pts	Qualification
1	Hungary	3	1	2	0	6	4	+2	5 (Note: Tied on head-to-head result (Iceland 1–1 Hungary). Overall goal difference was used as the tiebreaker.)	Advance to knockout stage
2	Iceland	3	1	2	0	4	3	+1	5	Advance to knockout stage
3	Portugal	3	0	3	0	4	4	0	3	Advance to knockout stage
4	Austria	3	0	1	2	1	4	−3	1	

Source: UEFA
Rules for classification: Group stage tiebreakers
Notes:

In the round of 16,

- The winner of Group F, Hungary, advanced to play the runner-up of Group E, Belgium.
- The runner-up of Group F, Iceland, advanced to play the runner-up of Group B, England.
- The third-placed team of Group F, Portugal, advanced to play the winner of Group D, Croatia.

In the round of 16 Hungary were eliminated by Belgium.

26 June 2016
21:00

Hungary	0–4	Belgium
	Report	Alderweireld 10'; Batshuayi 78'; Hazard 80'; Carrasco 90+1'

Stadium Municipal, Toulouse
Attendance: 28,921
Referee: Milorad Mažić (Serbia)

=== 2018 FIFA qualification ===
Hungary were drawn into 2018 FIFA World Cup qualification – UEFA Group B along with UEFA Euro 2016 winner Portugal, Switzerland, Faroe Islands, Latvia and Andorra. On the first match day Hungary drew with Faroe Island at Tórsvøllur, Tórshavn 6 September 2016. On the second match day Hungary lost to Switzerland 3–2 at home at the Groupama Aréna on 7 October 2016.

On 23 March 2018, Leekens debuted as the head coach of the national team. Hungary hosted Kazakhstan and suffered a shocking 3–2 defeat at the Groupama Arena.

On 27 March 2018, Hungary lost 1–0 to Scotland at the Groupama Arena.

Pos	Team	Pld	W	D	L	GF	GA	GD	Pts	Qualification
1	Portugal	10	9	0	1	32	4	+28	27	Qualification to 2018 FIFA World Cup
2	Switzerland	10	9	0	1	23	7	+16	27	Advance to second round
3	Hungary	10	4	1	5	14	14	0	13	
4	Faroe Islands	10	2	3	5	4	16	−12	9	
5	Latvia	10	2	1	7	7	18	−11	7	
6	Andorra	10	1	1	8	2	23	−21	4	

Source: FIFA
Rules for classification: Qualification tiebreakers

=== 2018–19 Nations League C ===
In the 2018–19 UEFA Nations League C Hungary were drawn in a group along with Finland, Greece and Estonia. Leekens was replaced by Honvéd's former manager Marco Rossi. Marco Rossi debuted as the new coach of Hungary on 8 September 2018 against Finland in the 2018–19 UEFA Nations League series. In the 2018–19 UEFA Nations League edition, Hungary finished second in their group; thus, they were promoted to the 2020–21 UEFA Nations League B. Hungary could beat Greece at the Ferencváros Stadion on 11 September 2018. However, on 12 October 2018 Hungary lost to Greece 1–0 at the Olympic Stadium (Athens), Athens, Greece. In the last two rounds, Hungary beat Estonia 2–0 at home, and Finland 2–0 at home. Since Greece lost to Estonia at home, Hungary finished second in their group and their chances to qualify for the UEFA Euro 2020 remained alive.

Pos	Team	Pld	W	D	L	GF	GA	GD	Pts	Promotion (Note: Due to revamp of the format for the 2020–21 UEFA Nations League, no teams were eventually relegated, and the second-placed teams in each group were also promoted.)
1	Finland (P)	6	4	0	2	5	3	+2	12	Promotion to League B
2	Hungary (P)	6	3	1	2	9	6	+3	10	Promotion to League B
3	Greece	6	3	0	3	4	5	−1	9	
4	Estonia	6	1	1	4	4	8	−4	4	

Source: UEFA
Rules for classification: Tiebreakers
(P) Promoted

== 2020s ==
=== Euro 2020 qualification ===
In the UEFA Euro 2020 qualifying, Hungary finished fourth in their group. On 21 March 2019, Hungary lost to Slovakia 2–0 at the Anton Malatinský Stadium, Trnava, Slovakia. However, Hungary beat 2018 FIFA World Cup Finalists Croatia on 24 March 2019 at the Ferencváros Stadion 1–0. In June 2019, Hungary beat Azerbaijan and Wales. However, in the decisive match against Slovakia, Hungary lost again 1–2 at home. On 19 November 2019, Hungary went to Wales to win their last match and qualify directly to the Euro 2020. However, Hungary lost 2–0 to Wales. Thanks to the results reached in the 2018–19 UEFA Nations League C, Hungary were given the chance to qualify for their Euro 2020. In the UEFA Euro 2020 qualifying play-offs, Hungary were drawn in Path A along with Bulgaria, Romania, and Iceland. In the first match, Hungary beat Bulgaria 3–1 on 8 October 2020 at the Vasil Levski National Stadium, Sofia, Bulgaria. Since Romania lost to Iceland at the Laugardalsvöllur, Reykjavík, Iceland, Hungary could play at the newly-built Puskás Aréna in Budapest. One day before the national team's decisive Euro 2020 qualifiers play-off match against Iceland, Rossi was tested positive for COVID-19. On 12 November 2020, Hungary qualified for the UEFA Euro 2020 by beating Iceland 2–1 at home.

Pos	Team	Pld	W	D	L	GF	GA	GD	Pts	Qualification
1	Croatia	8	5	2	1	17	7	+10	17	Qualify for final tournament
2	Wales	8	4	2	2	10	6	+4	14	Qualify for final tournament
3	Slovakia	8	4	1	3	13	11	+2	13	Advance to play-offs via Nations League
4	Hungary	8	4	0	4	8	11	−3	12	Advance to play-offs via Nations League
5	Azerbaijan	8	0	1	7	5	18	−13	1	

Source: UEFA
Rules for classification: Qualification tiebreakers

=== Euro 2020 ===
The UEFA Euro 2020 was held in 11 different cities in Europe among which there was Budapest. However, during the drawing procedure Germany was also drawn into the same group; therefore, Hungary could play only two matches in Budapest and the final match against Germany was played in Munich. The competition was originally scheduled for 2020; however, due to the COVID-19 pandemic the tournament was organised only in 2021. There were severe restrictions for the number of spectators in almost all stadiums, except for the Puskás Aréna.

The first match of the group was played against title holders Portugal. On 15 June 2021, Hungary lost 3–0 to Portugal in front of 55,662 supporters at the Puskás Aréna. The result was 0-0 until the 84th minute when Guerreiro scored the first goal, followed by Ronaldo's two goals. In the second match of the group, Hungary hosted the 2018 FIFA World Cup winners France at the Puskás Aréna on 19 June 2021. The first goal was scored by Fiola at the end of the first half. However, Griezmann could equalize in the 66t minute. The final score was a 1–1 draw. The final match of the group was play at the Allianz Arena, Munich, Germany on the 23 June 2021. Hungary had had to win the last match in order to qualify for the knock-out stage. In the 11th minute Szalai took the lead. However, Havertz could equalize in the 66th minute. Hungary could also score another goal, just two minutes later, a header by Schafer. Unfortunately, Germany could equalize the score once again in the 84th minute by Goretzka and the final result was a 2–2 draw which meant the farewell from the Euro 2020 for Hungary.

In the UEFA Euro 2020, Hungary failed to progress from the group stage, yet it impressed with an outstanding performance against three powerhouses Portugal, France and Germany, only losing 0–3 to the Portuguese after eighty minutes and drawing both France and Germany in process.

Pos	Team	Pld	W	D	L	GF	GA	GD	Pts	Qualification
1	France	3	1	2	0	4	3	+1	5	Advance to knockout stage
2	Germany (H)	3	1	1	1	6	5	+1	4 (Note: Head-to-head result: Portugal 2–4 Germany.)	Advance to knockout stage
3	Portugal	3	1	1	1	7	6	+1	4	Advance to knockout stage
4	Hungary (H)	3	0	2	1	3	6	−3	2	

Source: UEFA
Rules for classification: Group stage tiebreakers
(H) Hosts

=== 2020–21 Nations League B ===
In the 2020–21 UEFA Nations League B series, Hungary played against Serbia, Russia, and Turkey. Surprisingly, Hungary won their group by beating Turkey twice and Serbia once. Hungary beat Turkey 1–0 at the New Sivas 4 Eylül Stadium, Sivas, Turkey on 3 September 2020. Hungary also beat Serbia at the Red Star Stadium, Belgrade, Serbia on 11 October 2020. On the final match day, Hungary beat Turkey 2–0 at the Puskás Aréna on 18 November 2020.

Pos	Team	Pld	W	D	L	GF	GA	GD	Pts	Promotion or relegation
1	Hungary (P)	6	3	2	1	7	4	+3	11	Promotion to League A
2	Russia	6	2	2	2	9	12	−3	8	
3	Serbia	6	1	3	2	9	7	+2	6 (Note: Tied on head-to-head points (2) and head-to-head goal difference (0). Head-to-head away goals: Serbia 2, Turkey 0.)	
4	Turkey (R)	6	1	3	2	6	8	−2	6	Relegation to League C

Source: UEFA
Rules for classification: Tiebreakers
(P) Promoted; (R) Relegated

=== 2022–23 Nations League A ===
In the 2022–23 UEFA Nations League series, Rossi's Hungary were drawn in one of the most difficult groups including Italy, England, and Germany. Notwithstanding, Hungary finished second in the group and could beat England twice and Germany once in 2022. Hungary could beat England 1–0 at home in the Puskás Aréna on 4 June 2022. Ten days later, Hungary beat England 4–0 at the Molineux Stadium, Wolverhampton, England. On 23 September 2022, Hungary beat Germany 1–0 at the Red Bull Arena (Leipzig), Leipzig, Germany. In the last round, Hungary could have qualified for the finals; however, they lost to Italy at the Puskás Aréna on 26 September 2022.

Pos	Team	Pld	W	D	L	GF	GA	GD	Pts	Qualification or relegation
1	Italy	6	3	2	1	8	7	+1	11	Qualification for Nations League Finals
2	Hungary	6	3	1	2	8	5	+3	10	
3	Germany	6	1	4	1	11	9	+2	7	
4	England (R)	6	0	3	3	4	10	−6	3	Relegation to League B

Source: UEFA
Rules for classification: Tiebreakers
(R) Relegated

=== Euro 2024 qualifications ===
Hungary was placed in Pot A for the draw for the UEFA Euro 2024 qualifying campaign. Hungary was drawn into UEFA Euro 2024 qualifying Group G along with Serbia, Montenegro, Bulgaria, and Lithuania.

The first match was played against Bulgaria at home and Hungary won the match 3–0. The goals were scored by Vécsei, Szoboszlai, and Ádám.

Before the summer break, Hungary played against Montenegro in Podgorica and the match ended with a goalless draw. Three days later, on 20 June 2023, Hungary beat Lithuania 2–0 at the Puskás Aréna. The goals were scored by Varga and Sallai.

On 7 September 2023, Hungary beat Serbia 2–1 in the UEFA Euro 2024 qualifying match at the Stadion Rajko Mitic in Belgrade, Serbia. Three days later, on 10 September 2023, Hungary hosted Czech Republic in a friendly match at home. The match ended with a 1–1 draw; however, the key player of the defence, Wili Orbán, suffered a knee injury.

Before the matches in October, Rossi had to find a solution for substituting Orbán. Rossi selected Fiola to substitute Orbán. On 14 October 2023, Hungary beat Serbia 2–1 at the Puskás Aréna in the UEFA Euro 2024 qualifying match.

Before the match against Bulgaria, there were several problems for Rossi to solve. First, there were several players who were injured such as Orbán, Sallai, Fiola, and Varga. Rossi invited Németh to team and told him to leave Hamburg to have more chances for him to play regularly. Second, the Bulgarian Football Union asked the UEFA to hold the last home qualifiers behind closed doors to avoid any possibilities for the Bulgarian fans to protest. The location of the match was also changed from Sofia to Plovdiv. A week before the match it turned out that the match cannot be played in Plovdiv, because the stadium was being renovated. On 14 November 2023, the Bulgarian Football Union changed the location for a second time from Polvdiv to Sofia. In an interview with Nemzeti Sport, Cosimo Inguscio, the second coach of Hungary, said that Hungary should not aim to play a draw against Bulgaria because that approach always leads to a defeat. Hungary needed 1 point to qualify for the UEFA Euro 2024 before the match against Bulgaria. On 16 November 2023, Hungary drew with Bulgaria and qualified for the finals. The first goal was scored by Ádám; however, Bulgaria could equalize and take the lead. In the 97th minute Aleks Petkov scored an own goal, thus, equalizing the result 2–2. Last time Hungary qualified directly to a major tournament was in 1976.

After the Euro, there were rumors that Rossi would resign; however, in July he confirmed that he would continue.

=== 2024–25 Nations League ===
Hungary were drawn in 2024–25 UEFA Nations League A Group C along with Germany, the Netherlands, and Bosnia and Herzegovina. The first match was played in Germany at the Merkur Spiel-Arena in Düsseldorf on 7 September 2024 and Hungary were beaten 5–0. On 10 September 2024, Hungary hosted Bosnia and Herzegovina and the match ended with a goalless draw. On 11 October 2024, Hungary drew with the Netherlands at home. The only Hungarian goal was scored by Roland Sallai. On 14 October 2024, Hungary beat Bosnia and Hercegovina 2-0 at the Bilino Polje Stadium in Zenica. The two goals were scored by Szoboszlai. On 20 March 2025, Hungary were defeated by Turkey 3-1 at Rams Park in Istanbul in the first leg of the 2024–25 UEFA Nations League promotion/relegation play-offs. Before the match, it turned out that key players got injured including Roland Sallai and Callum Styles. Three days later, Hungary were defeated again by Turkey at the Puskás Aréna 3-0. Consequently, Hungary were relegated to 2026–27 UEFA Nations League B. On 23 March 2025, Bence Dárdai also played his first match in the national team along with his brother Márton Dárdai.
