= People's Garden =

Public park in Miskolc, Hungary

Coordinates: 48°5′42″N 20°47′21″E

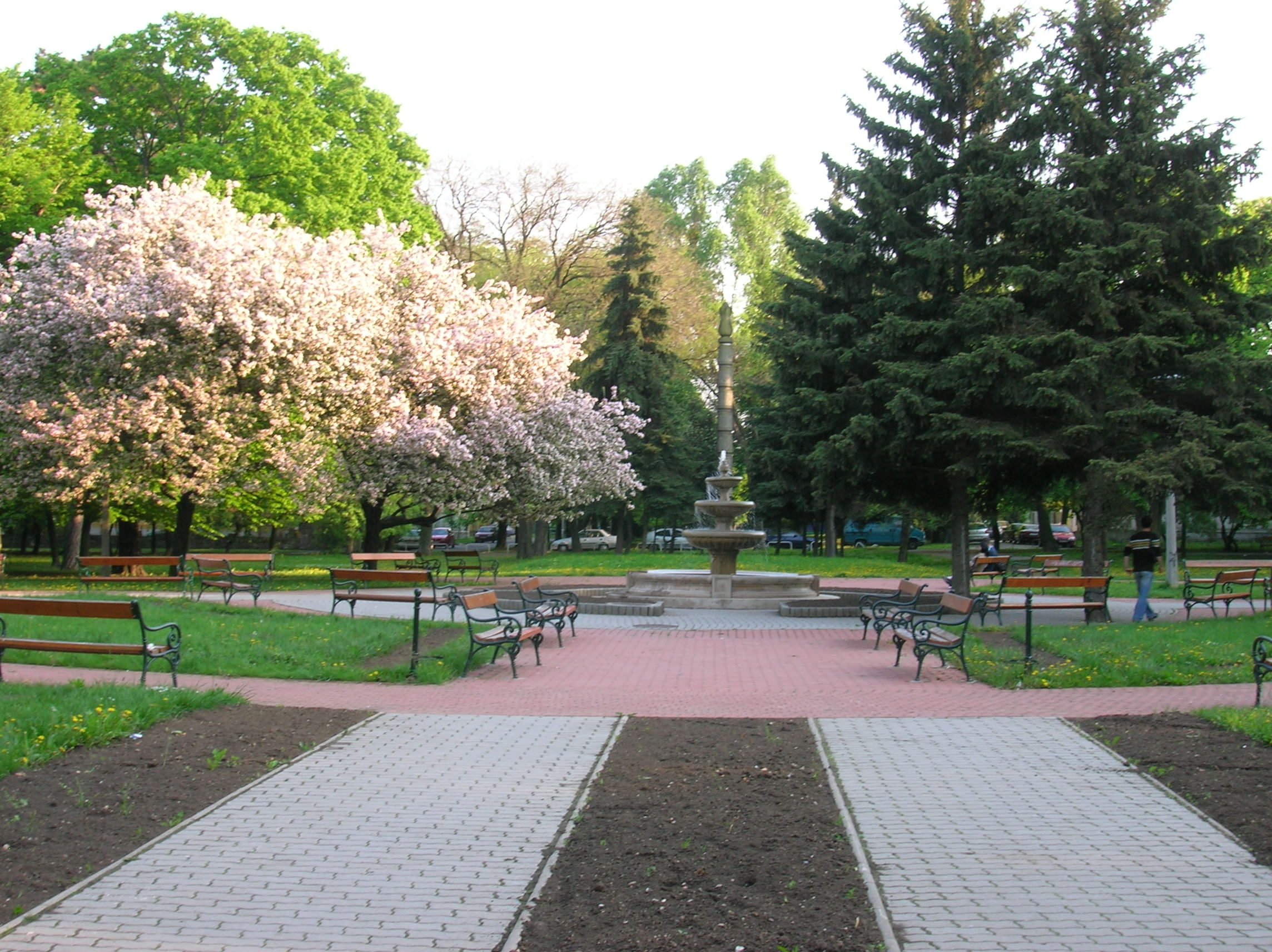
Spring in Népkert

The People's Garden (in Hungarian: Népkert) is a park in Miskolc, Hungary. With an area of 56.921 m^{2}, it is the third largest park of Miskolc (after Tapolca-Hejőliget and Csanyik, but since those are in the outer districts, Népkert is the largest park in the city proper. There are many sports facilities in the park.

== History ==
The park was fashioned in the 1870s. At that time it was on the edge of the city; after a few decades the area had become a villa district (several beautiful villas stand there today), and after Miskolc began to grow after World War II, the park became part of today's downtown.

== Sights and sports facilities ==
- Bronze statue of Queen Elisabeth (Sissi) by Alajos Stróbl; it was the first statue of Elisabeth in the country (1899)
- Vigadó Restaurant (designed by Alfréd Hajós; restored in 1996; address: Görgey street 19)
- Statue park
- Sports Hall (built in 1970)
- Ice Hall, a sports hall for ice sports (2006)
- Skating rink (in winter only)
- Two playgrounds

Népkert is also a colloquial name of the park Érsekkert (Archbishop's Garden) in Eger.

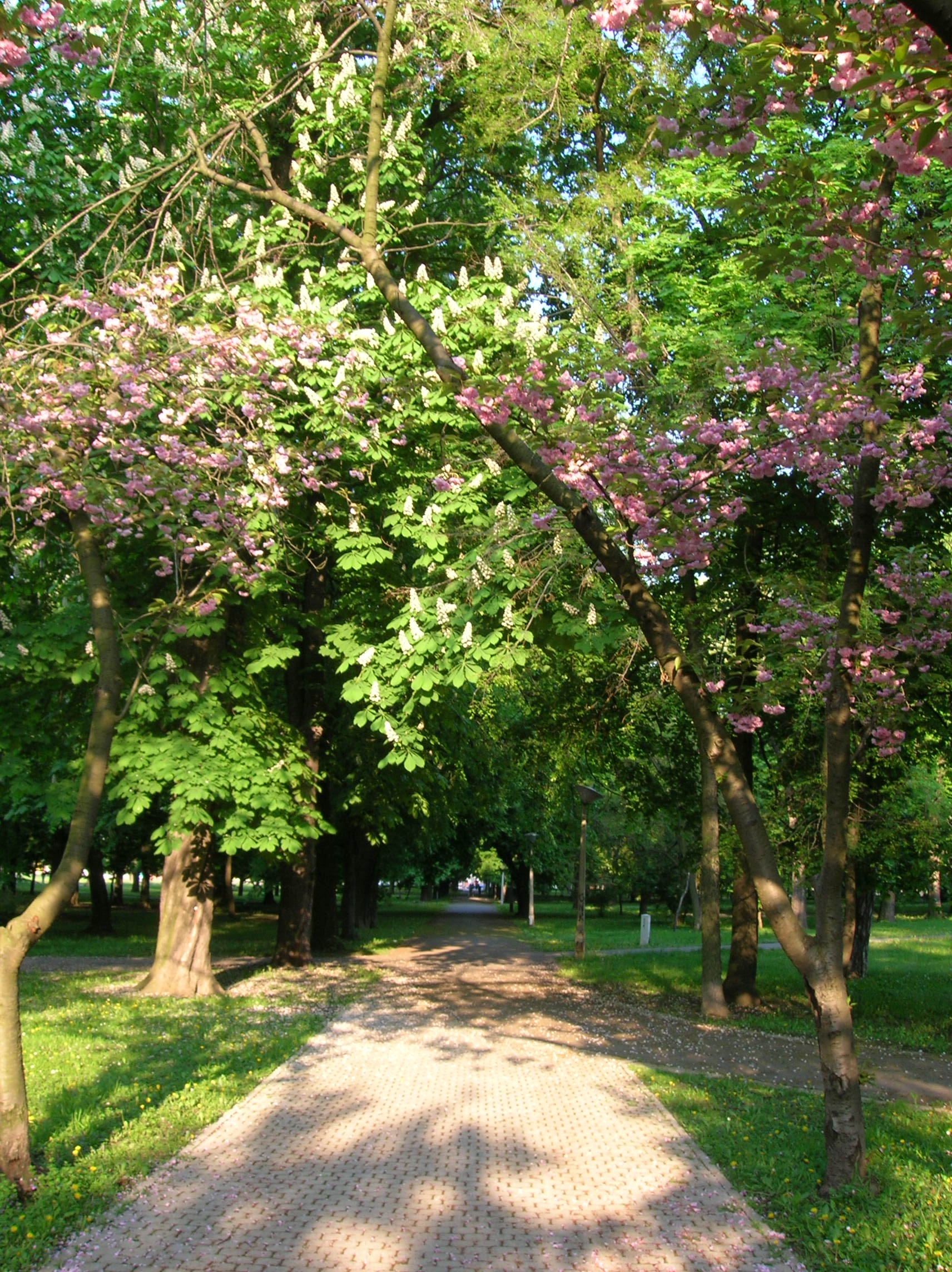
A path in the park

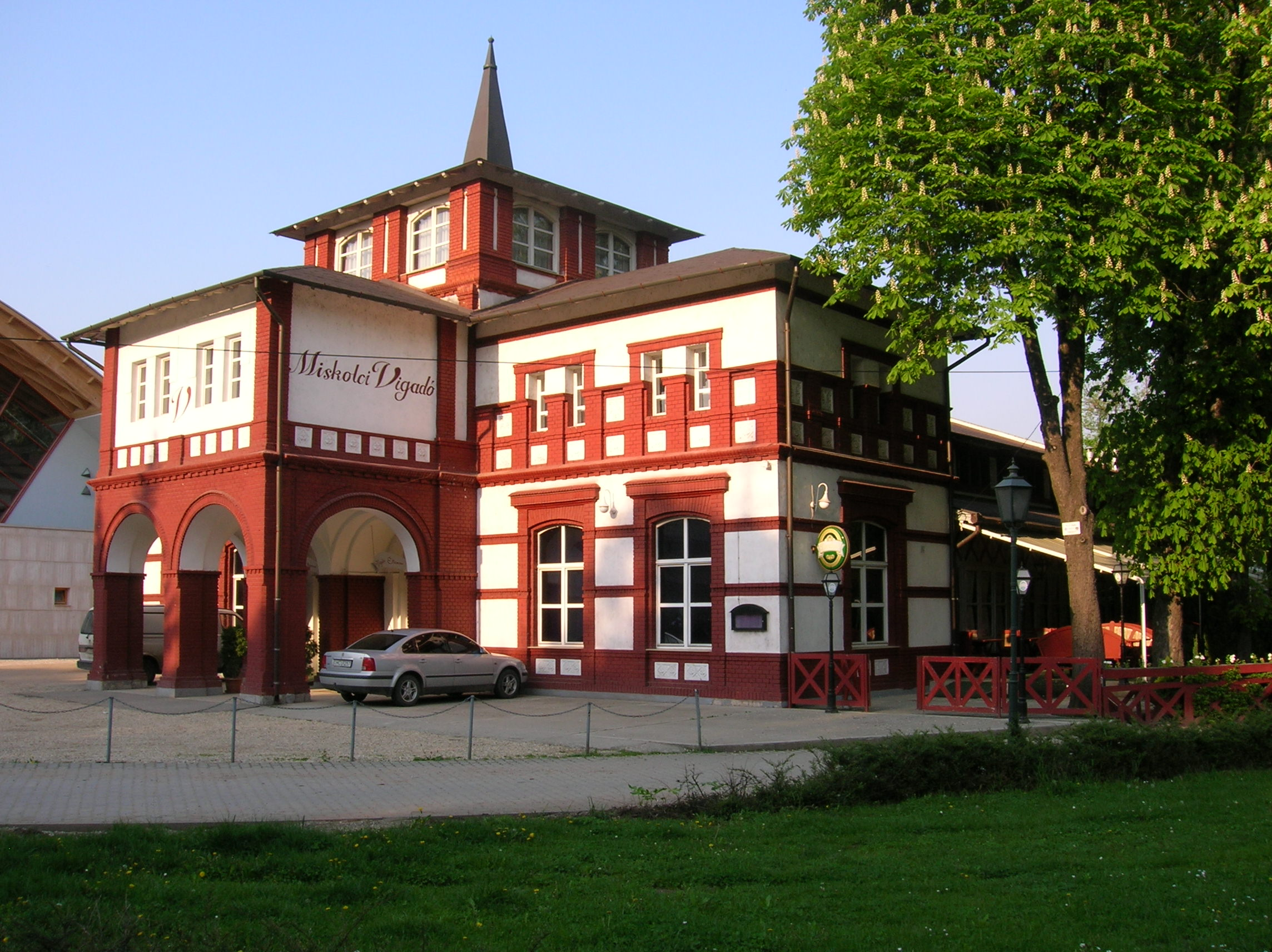
Vigadó Restaurant

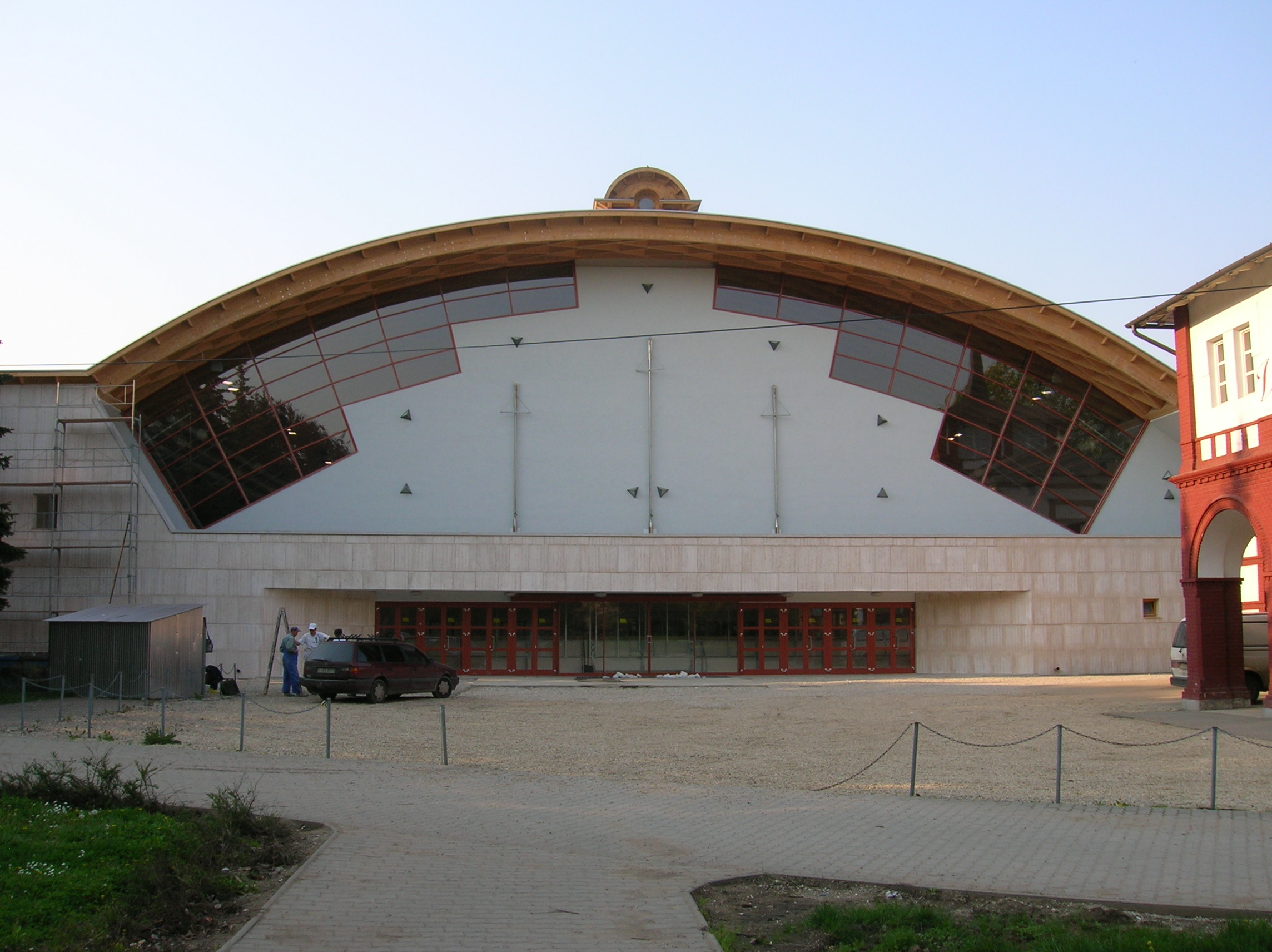
The Ice Hall

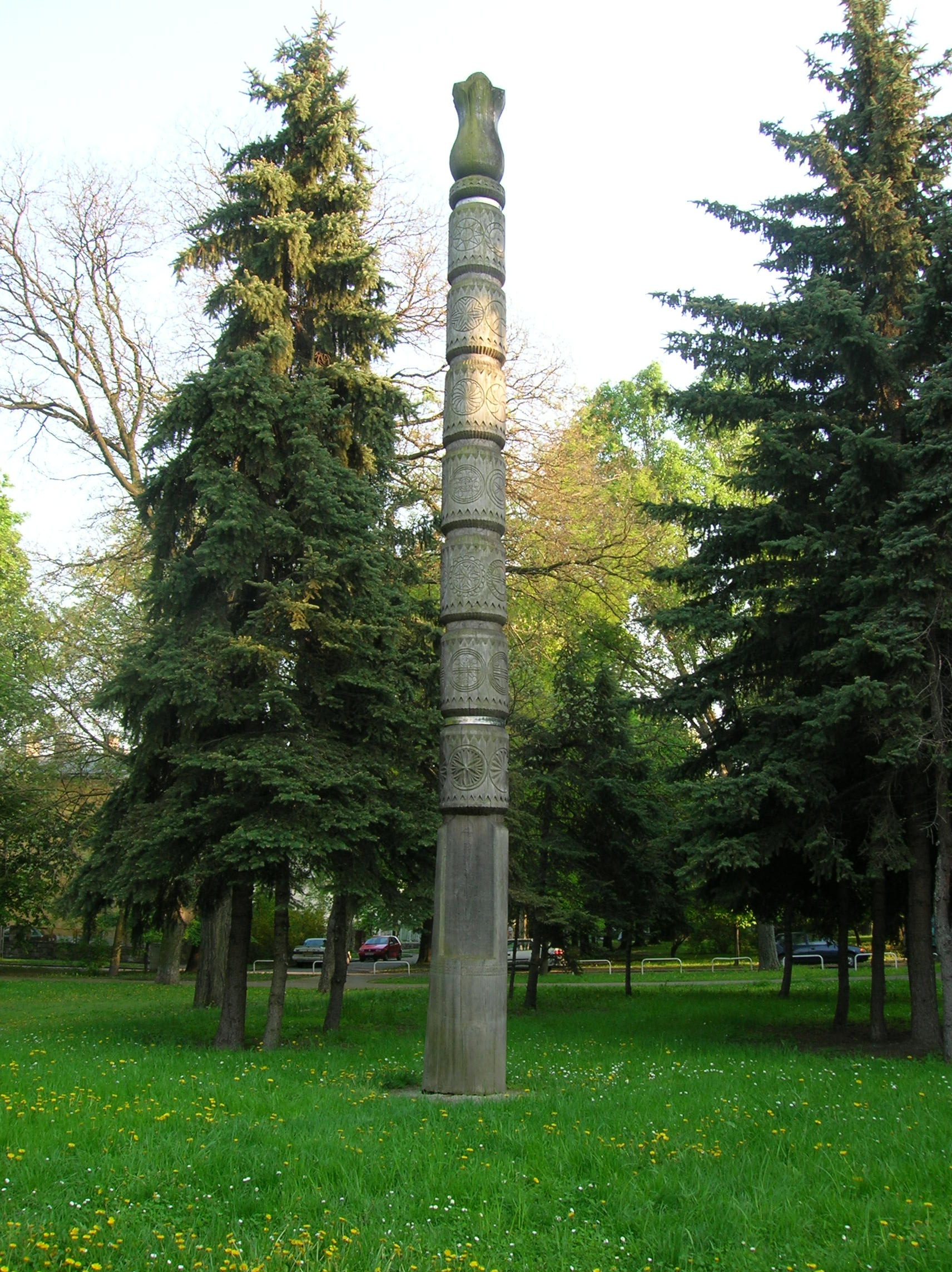
Obelisk

== Sources ==
- István Dobrossy (2001). Miskolc írásban és képekben 8. Miskolc: Borsod-Abaúj-Zemplén Megyei Levéltár, Miskolci Idegenforgalmi és Kulturális Iroda. p. 135–153. ISSN 1416-0617
- István Dobrossy (2001). Miskolc írásban és képekben 8. Miskolc: Borsod-Abaúj-Zemplén Megyei Levéltár, Miskolci Idegenforgalmi és Kulturális Iroda. p. 154–165. ISSN 1416-0617
- István Dobrossy (2001). Miskolc írásban és képekben 8. Miskolc: Borsod-Abaúj-Zemplén Megyei Levéltár, Miskolci Idegenforgalmi és Kulturális Iroda. p. 166–176. ISSN 1416-0617
- István Dobrossy (2001). Miskolc írásban és képekben 8. Miskolc: Borsod-Abaúj-Zemplén Megyei Levéltár, Miskolci Idegenforgalmi és Kulturális Iroda. p. 177–180. ISSN 1416-0617
