= Tamás Lapsánszki =

Hungarian footballer

Personal information
- Date of birth: 9 November 1974 (age 51)
- Place of birth: Kecskemét, Hungary
- Height: 1.76 m (5 ft 9 in)
- Position: Midfielder

Youth career
- Kecskeméti TE
- Kiskunfélegyházi TK

Senior career*
Years	Team	Apps	(Gls)
2002–2003	Békéscsabai Előre FC	14	(0)
- * Club domestic league appearances and goals as of 31 May 2003

Tamás Lapsánszki (born 9 November 1974) is a Hungarian footballer who plays for Békéscsabai Előre FC as midfielder.
