= Josef Taurer =

Austrian footballer

Personal information
- Place of birth: Austria
- Position: Forward

Senior career*
Years	Team	Apps	(Gls)
1897–1908	Wiener AC		
1908–1909	Vienna Cricket and Football-Club		

International career
1902–1905	Austria	6	(1)
- * Club domestic league appearances and goals

Josef Taurer was an Austrian international footballer. At club level, he played for Wiener AC and Vienna Cricket and Football-Club. He made 6 appearances for the Austria national team, scoring one goal, which was the first international goal scored by Austria.
