= Engelbert Schrammel =

Austrian footballer

International career
Years	Team	Apps	(Gls)
1902–1904	Austria	5	(0)

Engelbert Schrammel was an Austrian footballer. He played in five matches for the Austria national football team from 1902 to 1904.
