= Alfréd Hajós =

Hungarian swimmer and architect

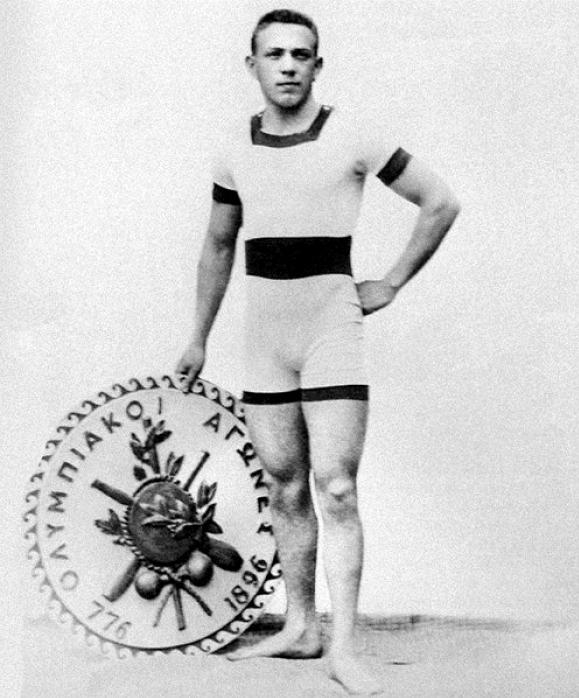
- Hajós in Athens, 1896

Personal information
- Nickname: The Hungarian Dolphin
- Nationality: Hungarian
- Born: Arnold Guttmann; 1 February 1878 Budapest, Kingdom of Hungary, Austria-Hungary
- Died: 12 November 1955 (aged 77) Budapest, Hungary

Sport
- Sport: Swimming
- Strokes: Freestyle
- Club: Magyar Testgyakorlók Köre
Medal record
Olympic Games
Representing Hungary
Swimming
Gold medal – first place	1896 Athens	100 m freestyle
Gold medal – first place	1896 Athens	1200 m freestyle
Art competitions
Silver medal – second place	1924 Paris	Town planning
Association football career
- Position: Forward
International career
Years	Team	Apps	(Gls)
1902	Hungary	1	(0)
Managerial career
- 1906: Hungary (3)

Alfréd Hajós (1 February 1878 – 12 November 1955) was a Hungarian swimmer, football (soccer) player, referee, manager, and career architect. He was the first modern Olympic swimming champion and the first Olympic champion of Hungary. Formerly excelling in track including discus and hurdles, he was part of the first National European football/soccer team fielded by Hungary in 1902, later serving as a referee as well as the manager and coach of the national football team.

== Biography ==
Hajós was born in Budapest, as Arnold Guttmann, to a family of Jewish heritage. He was 13 years old when he felt compelled to learn swimming after his father drowned in the Danube River. He took the name Hajós (sailor in Hungarian) for his athletic career because it was a Hungarian name.

In 1896, Hajós was an architecture student at the Royal Joseph Technical University in Hungary when the Athens Games took place. He was allowed to compete, but permission from the university to miss class was difficult to obtain. Upon return, the dean did not congratulate Hajós on his Olympic success, but instead said: "Your medals are of no interest to me, but I am eager to hear your replies in your next examination."

== Olympic swimmer ==
At the 1896 Games, the swimming events were held in the Mediterranean Sea in the cold Bay of Zea at Phaleron, requiring athletes to battle the elements. The 18-year-old Hajós won his two gold medals in extremely cold conditions in April (the water temperature was about 55 °F (13 °C) with 12-foot (4 m) waves crashing down on him. Impressively, he took gold medals in two of the four swimming events, winning both the 100-metre freestyle with a time of 1:22.2, and the 1,200-metre freestyle in 18:22.1. He was the youngest winner in Athens. His brother, Henrik Hajós, later won a gold medal in 4x250 m Freestyle swimming at the 1906 Olympic Games in Athens.

Prior to the 1896 Athens Olympics, Hajós was the 100 metre freestyle European swimming champion in 1895 and 1896.

== Track and football (soccer) ==
A versatile athlete, he won Hungary's 100 metre sprint championship in 1898, as well as the National 400 metre hurdles and discus titles. He also played as a forward in Hungary's national football (soccer) championship between 1901 and 1903, and on 12 October 1902, he again went down in history as one of the eleven football (soccer) athletes who played in the first international match played by the Hungarian national team, captaining his side in a 0–5 loss to Austria in Vienna. Between 1897 and 1904 he was also a football (soccer) referee, and during 1906 he was the coach of Hungary's national football (soccer) team, leading the nation in three games, achieving a record of two draws and 1 win.

== Architecture ==
=== Silver medal ===
In 1924, Hajós, an architect specializing in sport facilities, entered the art competitions at the Paris Olympic Games. His plan for a stadium, devised together with Dezső Lauber (who played tennis in the 1908 Summer Olympics), was awarded the silver medal; the jury did not award a gold medal in the competition. Thus making him one of only two Olympians ever to have won medals in both sport (swimming) and art (architecture) Olympic competitions.

=== Career ===
Graduating from the Technical University of Budapest in 1899, he originally had a partner, but became independent after the first World War. From 1948, he was technical advisor to the Design Office for Building Construction and was involved in the reconstruction of large public buildings in Budapest and Hungary. The best known sports facility designed by Hajós is the Alfréd Hajós National Swimming Stadium built on Margitsziget (Margaret Island) in the Danube in Budapest, which was built in 1930, and used for the 1958, 2006 and 2010 European Aquatics Championships, and the 2006 FINA Men's Water Polo World Cup.

== Honors ==
In 1953, the International Olympic Committee awarded him the Olympic diploma of merit. He is a member of the International Swimming Hall of Fame, and in 1981 was also made a member of the International Jewish Sports Hall of Fame. In 2010, Hajós posthumously was awarded the Ybl Miklós Prize, the greatest honor bestowed upon architects in Hungary.

== Buildings ==
His first designs were in Art Nouveau and eclectic style, later he turned to modernism and was influenced by Italian styles.

- Hotel Aranybika, Debrecen
- Gymnasium of Janko Francisci - Rimavský, (Levoča, 1913)
- Protestant Church Centre, Budapest
- Újpest FC's UTE Stadium, Újpest, Megyeri ut (1922)
- Swimming Stadium, Budapest, Margitsziget (today it bears his name)
- Millenáris Sportpálya, Budapest XIV
- Sports ground, Miskolc
- Sports ground, Pápa
- Sports ground, Szeged
- Sports ground, Kaposvár
- Girls' School (Hungarian: III. állam polgári leányiskola Pozsonyban, Slovak: III. štátna meštianska škola dievčenská v Bratislave) 1914, Bratislava
- Népkert Vigadó, Miskolc, Népkert
- Swimbath, Szeged (Ligetfürdő, 1930)

=== Gallery ===
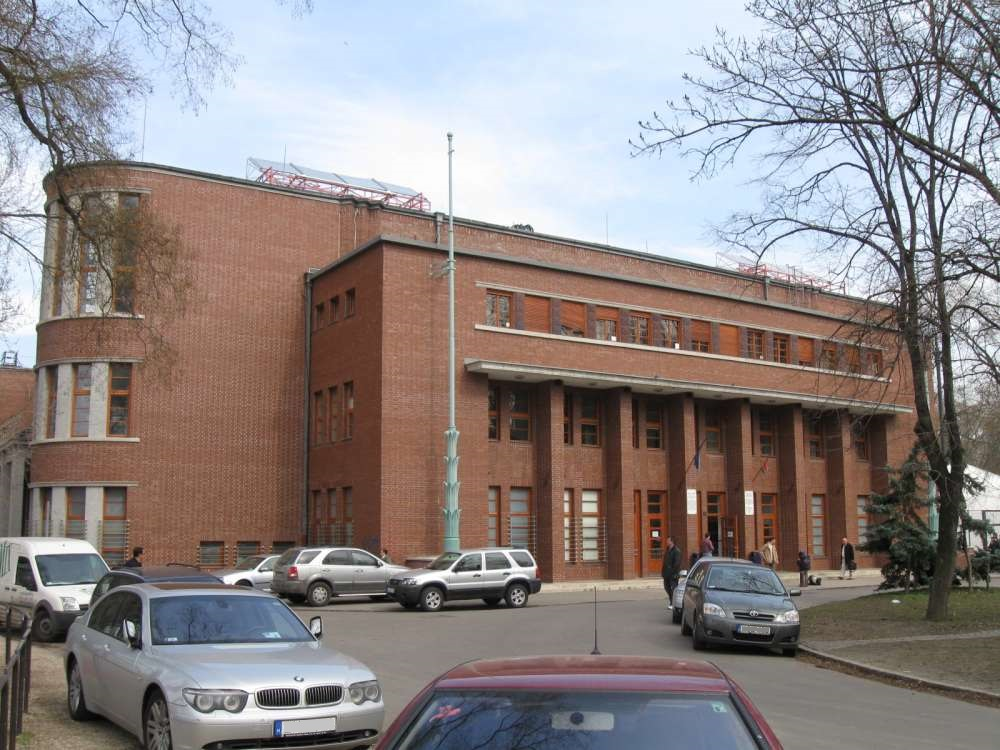
Alfréd Hajós National Swimming Stadium in Budapest (1930)

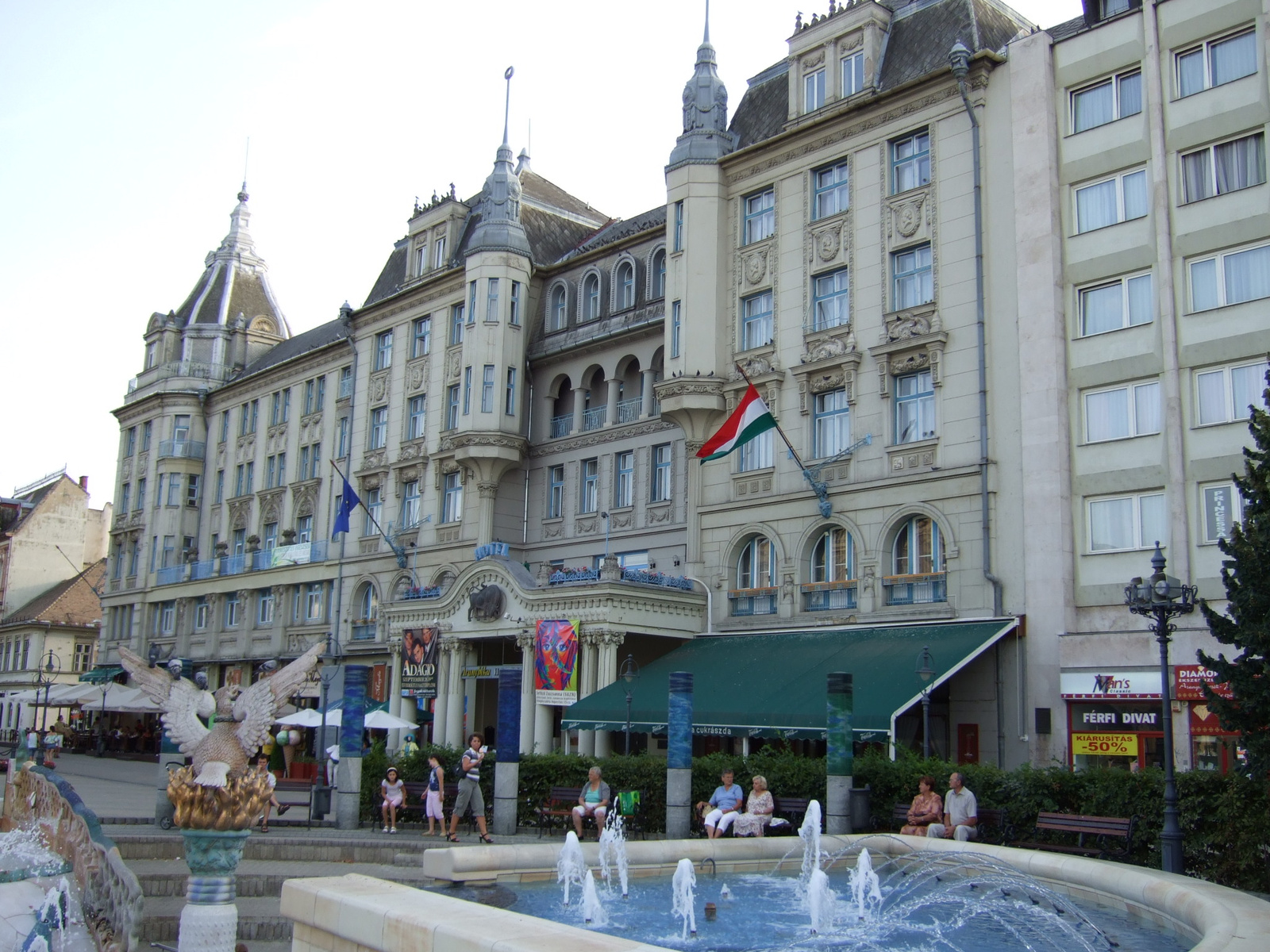
Grand Hotel Aranybika (1915)

== See also ==
- List of members of the International Swimming Hall of Fame
- List of select Jewish swimmers
