= Ján Francisci-Rimavský Gymnasium =

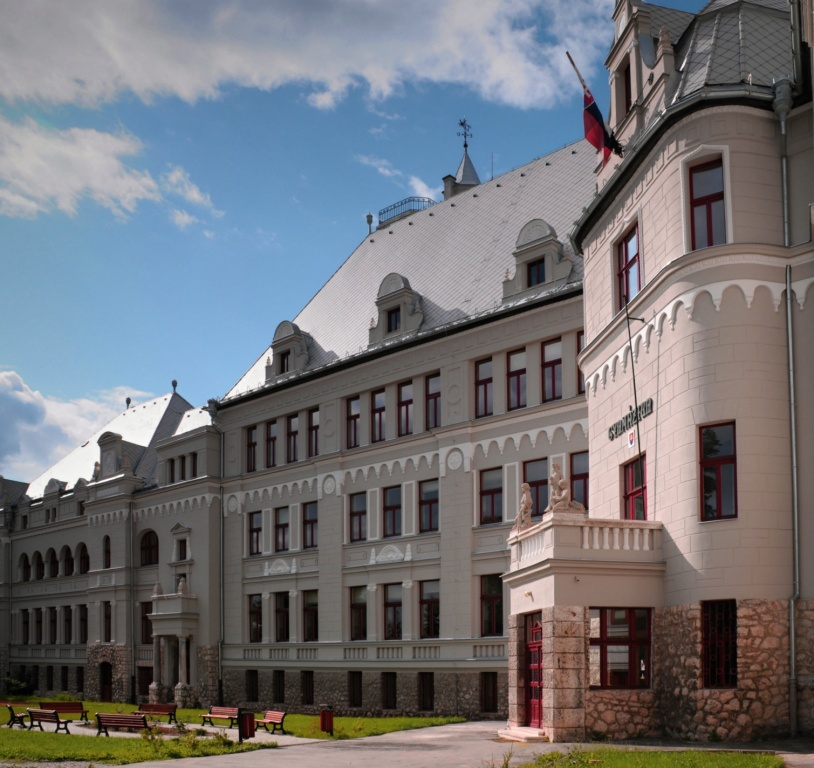

Location
- Kláštorská 37; 054 67; Levoča; Slovakia
- Coordinates: 49°01′32″N 20°35′07″E

Information
- Established: 1513
- Website: Gymnasium webpage

The Ján Francisci-Rimavský Gymnasium in Levoča, Slovakia, is a four-year high school with general classes and an eight-year college with a focus on foreign languages. Students are eligible to attend upon completion of the fifth grade of elementary school. The school is situated in the historic centre of Levoča. Renovation on its gym started in 2025, to increase energy efficiency.
