= Philipp Nauß =

Austrian footballer

Personal information
- Date of birth: 3 December 1881
- Date of death: 15 July 1958 (aged 76)

International career
Years	Team	Apps	(Gls)
1902	Austria	1	(0)

Philipp Nauß (3 December 1881 – 15 July 1958) was an Austrian footballer. He played in one match for the Austria national football team in 1902.
