= Gyula Bádonyi =

Hungarian footballer

Personal information
- Date of birth: 17 September 1882
- Place of birth: Szerencs, Zemplén County, Austria-Hungary
- Date of death: 6 June 1944 (aged 61)
- Place of death: Budapest, Hungary
- Position: Goalkeeper

Senior career*
| Years | Team | Apps | (Gls) |
| 1898–1899 | Budapesti TC | | |
| 1899–1901 | Budapesti Postás SE | | |
| 1901–1906 | Budapesti TC | | |

International career
| 1902 | Hungary | 1 | (0) |
- * Club domestic league appearances and goals

Gyula Bádonyi (17 September 1882 – 6 June 1944) was a footballer, first goalkeeper of the Hungary national team.

== Career ==
=== At clubs ===
A thin, high and fast player, Bádonyi used his hands as well. At his time there was a slogan: "Only drunk men lie on the grass!" He was a striker as well, and played well with his head. He started at BTC in 1898. He was among the founders of Budapesti Postás SE. He played here from 1899 to 1901, when he returned to his original club, which won the Hungarian Cup. He left the ground in 1906, maturated in commerce and worked for Magyar Posta.

=== At the national team ===
On 12 October 1902, he played goalkeeper in the first ever match for the Hungary national team against Austria. He never returned to the national team.

== Források ==
- Révai új lexikona I. (A–Baj). Főszerk. Kollega Tarsoly István. Szekszárd: Babits. 1996. 844. o. ISBN 963-901-595-4
- Új magyar életrajzi lexikon I. (A–Cs). Főszerk. Markó László. Budapest: Magyar Könyvklub. 2001. 251. o. ISBN 963-547-415-6
- Antal Zoltán – Hoffer József: Alberttől Zsákig, Budapest, Sportkiadó, 1968
