= Emil Gabrovitz =

Hungarian footballer (1875–1947)

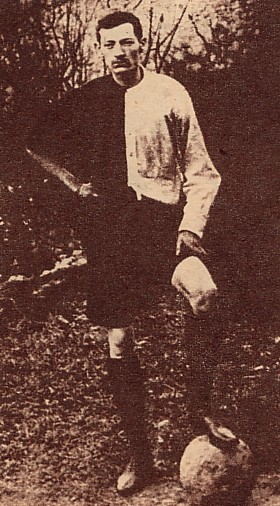
- Gabrovitz in 1901

Personal information
- Date of birth: 3 June 1875
- Place of birth: Budapest, Hungary
- Date of death: 7 June 1947 (aged 72)
- Position: Defender

Senior career*
Years	Team	Apps	(Gls)
- Postások Budapest

International career
1902	Hungary	1	(0)
- * Club domestic league appearances and goals

Emil Gabrovitz (3 June 1875 – 7 June 1947) was a Hungarian footballer who played as a defender. He made his debut and obtained his only cap for the Hungary national team on 12 October 1902 against Austria in Vienna. His brother, Kornél Gabrovitz, was also a football defender. His son, also named Emil Gabrovitz, was a Hungarian tennis champion.
