= László Cseke =

Hungarian footballer (born 1975)

Personal information
- Date of birth: 24 August 1975 (age 51)
- Place of birth: Szekszárd, Hungary
- Height: 1.77 m (5 ft 10 in)
- Position: Midfielder

Youth career
- Szekszárdi UFC

Senior career*
Years	Team	Apps	(Gls)
1997–1998	BVSC-Zugló FC	7	(0)
1998–2000	Dunaújváros FC	26	(2)
2000–2002	Celldömölki VSE	?	(?)
2002–2005	Békéscsabai Előre FC	20	(0)
2005–2006	Celldömölki VSE	23	(4)
2006–2008	Ajka FC	15	(6)
- * Club domestic league appearances and goals as of 31 May 2003

László Cseke (born 24 August 1975) is a Hungarian footballer who plays for Békéscsabai Előre FC as a midfielder.
