= List of SK Rapid Wien records and statistics =

Details of the records and statistics for the Austrian football club Sportklub Rapid. All data compiled from the official club archive and the Austria Soccer database.

Players in bold are currently active for Rapid Wien.

As of 21 November 2026

== Highest wins and losses ==
=== Highest Wins ===
==== League ====
Result	Date	Venue	Opponent
13–1	12 March 1939	A	Wacker Wr. Neustadt
12–1	18 May 1957	H	Kremser SC
12–1	24 September 1950	H	Sturm Graz
11–0	4 March 1951	A	Elektra Wien
11–1	22 June 1977	H	GAK
11–1	15 December 1940	H	Grazer SC
10–0	27 September 1985	A	GAK
10–0	30 August 1958	H	Olympia Vienna
10–0	30 April 1958	H	Sturm Graz
10–0	27 March 1946	H	Ostbahn XI
10–0	4 March 1934	H	Wiener AC
10–0	27 September 1931	H	Slovan Wien

==== Cup ====
Result	Date	Venue	Opponent
17–0	19 January 1930	H	SC Neubau
17–2	12 February 1933	H	SC Neubau
14–0	20 January 1929	H	Libertas Wien
14–1	17 April 1932	H	FC Ostmark
11–0	23 February 1919	H	Wiener Bewegungsspieler
10–0	12 October 1991	A	SV Rohrbach
10–0	30 August 1983	A	Red Star Penzing
10–0	14 March 1920	H	Red Star Penzing
10–1	15 August 1965	A	Villacher SV
10–1	14 January 1934	H	Rudolfsheimer SV

==== International ====
Result	Date	Venue	Opponent	Competition
8–0	29 September 1982	H	(Luxembourg) Avenir Beggen	European Cup
8–1	14 December 1926	H	(Kingdom of Yugoslavia) Hajduk Split	Mitropa Cup
6–0	16 September 1987	H	(Malta) Ħamrun Spartans	European Cup
6–1	1 August 2024	H	(Poland) Wisła Kraków	Europa League (qualification)
6–1	27 July 2005	A	(Luxembourg) F91 Dudelange	Champions League (qualification)
6–1	12 August 1997	H	(Czech Republic) Boby Brno	UEFA Cup (qualification)
6–1	21 September 1955	H	(Netherlands) PSV	European Cup
6–1	3 September 1930	H	(Italy) Genova 1893	Mitropa Cup
5–0	17 August 2023	A	(Hungary) Debreceni VSC	Europa Conference League (qualification)
5–0	16 July 2009	H	(Albania) Vllaznia Shkodër	Europa League (qualification)
5–0	30 August 2007	H	(Georgia (country)) Dinamo Tbilisi	UEFA Cup (qualification)
5–0	18 September 1985	H	(Hungary) Tatabánya	Cup Winners' Cup
5–0	20 March 1985	H	(East Germany) Dynamo Dresden	Cup Winners' Cup
5–0	15 September 1982	A	(Luxembourg) Avenir Beggen	European Cup
5–0	3 July 1951	H	(Italy) Lazio	Zentropa Cup

=== Highest Losses ===
==== League ====
Result	Date	Venue	Opponent
2–10	24 October 1943	A	First Vienna
1–7	14 February 1943	A	Floridsdorfer AC
0–6	11 October 1969	H	Austria Wien
2–7	24 June 2020	H	RB Salzburg
1–6	16 December 2018	A	Austria Wien
1–6	19 July 2014	A	RB Salzburg
1–6	28 April 2002	A	Austria Salzburg
1–6	14 April 1990	A	FC Tirol
0–5	28 April 2024	A	LASK
0–5	29 March 1998	A	LASK
0–5	8 May 1993	A	VSE St. Pölten
0–5	21 November 1970	A	Wacker Innsbruck
0–5	22 May 1955	A	First Vienna
0–5	16 May 1937	A	Austria Wien
0–5	9 May 1926	H	Austria Wien

==== Cup ====
Result	Date	Venue	Opponent
0–8	10 May 1934	N	Admira Wien
2–6	16 December 2020	A	RB Salzburg
2–6	17 April 1974	H	Austria Wien
2–6	11 January 1931	A	Admira Wien
0–4	1 March 1931	A	First Vienna
0–4	27 April 1930	A	First Vienna
3–6	23 May 1943	A	Kapfenberger SV
2–5	21 March 1948	H	Austria Wien
1–4	30 September 1995	A	Admira Wacker
1–4	22 May 1974	A	Austria Wien
1–4	5 May 1932	A	Admira Wien

==== International ====
Result	Date	Venue	Opponent	Competition
2–9	4 August 1956	A	(Hungary) Vasas SC	Mitropa Cup
1–7	28 October 1928	A	(Hungary) Ferencváros	Mitropa Cup
0–6	18 February 2016	A	(Spain) Valencia CF	Europa League
2–7	12 February 1956	A	(Italy) A.C. Milan	European Cup
1–6	1 July 1934	A	(Italy) AGC Bologna	Mitropa Cup
0–5	25 October 2018	A	(Spain) Villarreal CF	Europa League
0–5	30 October 1996	A	(Italy) Juventus	Champions League
2–6	22 November 1961	H	(Italy) Fiorentina	Cup Winners' Cup
2–6	30 October 1927	A	(Czechoslovakia) Sparta Prague	Mitropa Cup
1–5	22 October 2009	A	(Israel) Hapoel Tel Aviv	Europa League
1–5	19 March 1986	A	(Soviet Union) Dynamo Kyiv	Cup Winners' Cup
1–5	28 June 1936	A	(Italy) A.S. Roma	Mitropa Cup

== Goalscorers ==
For a ranking of league and total goals see article List of SK Rapid Wien players

=== International goals ===
Goals	Name	Rapid Wien career	Competitions
25	(Germany) Steffen Hofmann	2002–2005; 2006–2018	UEFA Champions League (3); UEFA Europa League/UEFA Cup (18); Intertoto Cup (4)
21	(Austria) **Louis Schaub**	2012–2018; 2024–	UEFA Champions League (3); UEFA Europa League (13); UEFA Conference League (5)
18	(Austria) Hans Krankl	1970–1978; 1981–1986	European Cup (5); UEFA Cup Winners' Cup (8); UEFA Cup (5)
17	(Austria) Franz Weselik	1924–1934	Mitropa Cup
15	(Austria) Ferdinand Wesely	1921–1931	Mitropa Cup
13	(Croatia) Nikica Jelavić	2008–2010	UEFA Europa League
12	(Czechoslovakia) Antonín Panenka	1981–1985	European Cup (5); UEFA Cup Winners' Cup (5); UEFA Cup (2)
12	(Austria) Rudolf Flögel	1958–1972	European Cup (5); UEFA Cup Winners' Cup (4); Inter-Cities Fairs Cup (3)
12	(Austria) Alfred Körner	1943–1959	European Cup (4); Mitropa Cup (8)
11	(Austria) **Ercan Kara**	2020–2022; 2025–	UEFA Champions League (1); UEFA Europa League (5); UEFA Conference League (5)
11	(Czech Republic) René Wagner	1996–2004	UEFA Cup
11	(Socialist Federal Republic of Yugoslavia) (Croatia) Zlatko Kranjčar	1984–1990	European Cup (5); UEFA Cup Winners' Cup (4); UEFA Cup (2)

=== Domestic cup goals ===
Includes both the Austrian Cup and the German Tschammerpokal during the annexation of Austria from 1938 to 1945.

Goals	Name	Rapid Wien career
93	(Austria) Franz Binder	1930–1948
58	(Austria) Matthias Kaburek	1929–1936; 1939–1945
51	(Austria) Hans Krankl	1970–1978; 1981–1986
40	(Austria) Franz Weselik	1924–1934
37	(Austria) Rudolf Flögel	1958–1972
29	(Austria) Ferdinand Wesely	1921–1931
23	(Denmark) Johnny Bjerregaard	1966–1972
20	(Austria) Josef Uridil	1918–1925; 1926–1927
19	(Austria) Georg Schors	1938–1947
17	(Norway) Jan Åge Fjørtoft	1989–1993

=== Goals as substitute ===
Goals	Name	Substitutions	Rapid Wien career
10	(Austria) Atdhe Nuhiu	45	2010–2012
10	(Austria) **Ercan Kara**	53	2020–2022; 2025–
10	(Austria) Deni Alar	76	2011–2016; 2018–2019; 2020–2021
9	(Austria) **Yusuf Demir**	48	2019–2021; 2022; 2026–
8	(Austria) Peter Hristic	40	1985–1988
8	(Austria) Gerald Willfurth	41	1981–1989
8	(Slovakia) Marek Penksa	46	1996–1999
8	(Austria) Christoph Knasmüllner	55	2018–2023
8	(Austria) Franz Weber	62	1985–1994
7	(Austria) Erwin Hoffer	37	2006–2009
7	(Austria) Christopher Trimmel	66	2009–2014
7	(Austria) **Louis Schaub**	88	2012–2018; 2024–

=== Most goals in one game ===
Goals	Name	Date	Opponent	Result	Venue	Competition
7	(Austria) Hans Krankl	22 June 1977	(Austria) GAK	11–1	H	1976–77 Austrian Football Bundesliga
7	(Nazi Germany) Franz Binder	12 March 1939	(Nazi Germany) Wacker Wr. Neustadt	13–1	A	1938–39 Gauliga Ostmark
7	(Austria) Matthias Kaburek	17 April 1932	(Austria) FC Ostmark Wien	14–1	H	1931–32 Austrian Cup
7	(Austria) Josef Uridil	10 April 1921	(Austria) Wiener AC	7–5	H	1920–21 Austrian football championship
7	(Austria) Josef Uridil	23 February 1919	(Austria) Wiener Bewegungsspieler	11–0	H	1918–19 Austrian Cup
6	(Austria) Hans Krankl	30 August 1983	(Austria) Red Star Penzing	10–0	A	1983–84 Austrian Cup
6	(Austria) Lukas Aurednik	27 March 1946	(Austria) Ostbahn XI	10–0	H	1945–46 Austrian football championship
6	(Nazi Germany) Franz Binder	12 May 1940	(Nazi Germany) NSTG Graslitz	7–0	H	1939–40 German football championship
6	(Austria) Franz Binder	30 October 1932	(Austria) Admira Wien	7–4	A	1932–33 Austrian football championship
6	(Austria) Matthias Kaburek	19 January 1930	(Austria) SC Neubau	17–0	H	1929–30 Austrian Cup

=== Youngest and oldest goal scorers ===
Note: Some players in Rapid history have unknown birthdates and are therefore not considered in the following lists.

==== Youngest goal scorers ====
Name	Age	Date	Opponent	Result	Competition
(Austria) Hermann Dvoracek	16 years, 5 months and 7 days	11 October 1936	(Austria) Floridsdorfer AC	1–2	1936–37 Austrian football championship
(Austrian Empire) Gustav Wieser	16 years, 11 months and 20 days	13 June 1915	(Austrian Empire) Simmering	7–3	1914–15 Austrian football championship
(Nazi Germany) Alfred Körner	17 years	14 February 1943	(Nazi Germany) Floridsdorfer AC	1–7	1942–43 Gauliga Donau-Alpenland
(Austria) Andreas Ivanschitz	17 years, 1 month and 17 days	2 December 2000	(Austria) SW Bregenz	5–0	2000–01 Austrian Football Bundesliga
(Austria) Alfred Vuga	17 years, 2 months and 23 days	24 August 1952	(Austria) Grazer SC	6–2	1952–53 Austrian football championship
(Austria) Yusuf Demir	17 years, 2 months and 28 days	30 August 2020	(Austria) St. Johann/Pongau	5–0	2020–21 Austrian Cup
(Austrian Empire) Rudolf Rupec	17 years, 3 months and 26 days	15 March 1914	(Austrian Empire) First Vienna	3–1	1913–14 Austrian football championship
(Austria) Veli Kavlak	17 years, 6 months and 10 days	13 May 2006	(Austria) SV Ried	6–0	2005–06 Austrian Football Bundesliga
(Austria) Johann Hoffmann	17 years, 10 months and 17 days	22 November 1925	(Austria) Hakoah Vienna	3–1	1925–26 Austrian football championship
(Austria) Walter Probst	17 years, 11 months and 12 days	29 March 1936	(Austria) Hakoah Vienna	6–0	1935–36 Austrian football championship

==== Oldest goal scorers ====
Name	Age	Date	Opponent	Result	Competition
(Germany) Steffen Hofmann	37 years, 8 months and 11 days	20 May 2018	(Austria) SCR Altach	4–1	2017–18 Austrian Football Bundesliga
(Austria) Richard Kuthan	37 years, 4 months and 12 days	15 November 1928	(Austria) FC Wien	2–3	1928–29 Austrian football championship
(Austria) Franz Golobic	37 years and 26 days	3 May 1959	(Austria) DSV Leoben	6–1	1958–59 Austrian football championship
(Austria) Franz Binder	36 years, 11 months and 20 days	21 November 1948	(Austria) Feuerwehr Wien	4–1	1948–49 Austrian Cup
(Czechoslovakia) František Veselý	36 years, 9 months and 20 days	27 September 1980	Austria Salzburg	4–1	1980–81 Austrian Football Bundesliga
(Austria) Guido Burgstaller	36 years, 1 month and 3 days	1 June 2025	(Austria) LASK	3–0	2024–25 Austrian Football Bundesliga
(Czechoslovakia) Antonín Panenka	34 years, 10 months and 15 days	7 June 1985	(Austria) GAK	3–3	1984–85 Austrian Football Bundesliga
(Austria) Gerhard Hanappi	34 years, 9 months and 29 days	15 December 1963	(Austria) Wacker Wien	5–0	1963–64 Austrian Cup
(Austria) Martin Hiden	34 years, 7 months and 15 days	26 October 2007	(Austria) LASK	4–4	2007–08 Austrian Football Bundesliga
(Federal Republic of Yugoslavia) Dejan Savićević	34 years, 7 months and 13 days	28 April 2001	(Austria) LASK	6–0	2000–01 Austrian Football Bundesliga

=== Top goalscorers by season ===
Bold means the player was also the league's overall top goal scorer.

Season	League		Total	
Season	Goals	Player	Goals	Player
1911/12	12	(Austrian Empire) Gustav Blaha	12	(Austrian Empire) Gustav Blaha
1912/13	15	(Austrian Empire) Richard Kuthan	15	(Austrian Empire) Richard Kuthan
1913/14	13	(Austrian Empire) Richard Kuthan	13	(Austrian Empire) Richard Kuthan
1914/15	8	(Austrian Empire) Eduard Bauer	8	(Austrian Empire) Eduard Bauer
1915/16	24	(Austrian Empire) **Richard Kuthan**	24	(Austrian Empire) Richard Kuthan
1916/17	21	(Austrian Empire) **Eduard Bauer**	21	(Austrian Empire) Eduard Bauer
1917/18	20	(Austrian Empire) **Eduard Bauer**	20	(Austrian Empire) Eduard Bauer
1918/19	14	(Austria) **Josef Uridil**	28	(Austria) Josef Uridil
1919/20	21	(Austria) **Josef Uridil**	27	(Austria) Josef Uridil
1920/21	35	(Austria) **Josef Uridil**	35	(Austria) Josef Uridil
1921/22	21	(Austria) **Richard Kuthan**	21	(Austria) Richard Kuthan
1922/23	15	(Austria) Josef Uridil	16	(Austria) Richard Kuthan
1923/24	14	(Austria) Josef Uridil (Austria) Ferdinand Wesely	14	(Austria) Josef Uridil (Austria) Ferdinand Wesely
1924/25	16	(Austria) Franz Weselik	17	(Austria) Franz Weselik
1925/26	18	(Austria) Ferdinand Wesely	18	(Austria) Ferdinand Wesely
1926/27	15	(Austria) Johann Luef	20	(Austria) Johann Luef
1927/28	20	(Austria) Ferdinand Wesely	27	(Austria) Ferdinand Wesely
1928/29	13	(Austria) Franz Weselik	34	(Austria) Franz Weselik
1929/30	24	(Austria) **Franz Weselik**	35	(Austria) Franz Weselik
1930/31	16	(Austria) Franz Weselik	25	(Austria) Franz Weselik
1931/32	21	(Austria) Franz Weselik	35	(Austria) Matthias Kaburek
1932/33	25	(Austria) **Franz Binder**	32	(Austria) Franz Binder
1933/34	29	(Austria) (Czech Republic) **Josef Bican**	35	(Austria) (Czech Republic) Josef Bican
1934/35	27	(Austria) **Matthias Kaburek**	35	(Austria) Franz Binder
1935/36	17	(Austria) Franz Binder	24	(Austria) Franz Binder
1936/37	29	(Austria) **Franz Binder**	37	(Austria) Franz Binder
1937/38	22	(Austria) **Franz Binder**	22	(Austria) Franz Binder
1938/39	27	(Nazi Germany) **Franz Binder**	31	(Nazi Germany) Franz Binder
1939/40	18	(Nazi Germany) **Franz Binder**	50	(Nazi Germany) Franz Binder
1940/41	27	(Nazi Germany) **Franz Binder**	44	(Nazi Germany) Franz Binder
1941/42	8	(Nazi Germany) Fritz Roth	11	(Nazi Germany) Franz Binder
1942/43	23	(Nazi Germany) Hermann Dvoracek	28	(Nazi Germany) Hermann Dvoracek
1943/44	12	(Nazi Germany) Hermann Dvoracek	12	(Nazi Germany) Hermann Dvoracek
1944/45	not completed		3	(Nazi Germany) Franz Kaspirek (Nazi Germany) Robert Körner
1945/46	28	(Austria) Lukas Aurednik	35	(Austria) Lukas Aurednik
1946/47	15	(Austria) Alfred Körner	16	(Austria) Franz Binder
1947/48	16	(Austria) Leopold Ströll	19	(Austria) Alfred Körner
1948/49	15	(Austria) Leopold Ströll	17	(Austria) Leopold Ströll
1949/50	22	(Austria) Alfred Körner	22	(Austria) Alfred Körner
1950/51	37	(Austria) **Robert Dienst**	37	(Austria) Robert Dienst
1951/52	28	(Austria) Erich Probst	28	(Austria) Erich Probst
1952/53	29	(Austria) Robert Dienst	29	(Austria) Robert Dienst
1953/54	25	(Austria) **Robert Dienst**	25	(Austria) Robert Dienst
1954/55	29	(Austria) Robert Dienst	29	(Austria) Robert Dienst
1955/56	25	(Austria) Gerhard Hanappi	30	(Austria) Gerhard Hanappi
1956/57	32	(Austria) **Robert Dienst**	34	(Austria) Robert Dienst
1957/58	30	(Austria) Robert Dienst	32	(Austria) Robert Dienst
1958/59	28	(Austria) Robert Dienst	31	(Austria) Robert Dienst
1959/60	25	(Austria) Robert Dienst	27	(Austria) Robert Dienst
1960/61	17	(Austria) Rudolf Flögel	24	(Austria) Rudolf Flögel
1961/62	16	(West Germany) Max Schmid	21	(West Germany) Max Schmid
1962/63	17	(Austria) Rudolf Flögel	20	(Austria) Rudolf Flögel
1963/64	18	(Austria) Rudolf Flögel	21	(Austria) Rudolf Flögel
1964/65	15	(Austria) Walter Seitl	16	(Austria) Walter Seitl
1965/66	15	(Austria) Walter Seitl	18	(Austria) Rudolf Flögel
1966/67	21	(Austria) **August Starek**	23	(Austria) August Starek
1967/68	23	(Denmark) **Johnny Bjerregaard**	25	(Denmark) Johnny Bjerregaard
1968/69	20	(Denmark) Johnny Bjerregaard	26	(Denmark) Johnny Bjerregaard
1969/70	20	(Denmark) Johnny Bjerregaard	25	(Denmark) Johnny Bjerregaard
1970/71	19	(Denmark) Johnny Bjerregaard	23	(Denmark) Johnny Bjerregaard
1971/72	8	(Austria) Geza Gallos	12	(West Germany) Bernd Lorenz
1972/73	14	(Austria) Hans Krankl	21	(Austria) Hans Krankl
1973/74	36	(Austria) **Hans Krankl**	42	(Austria) Hans Krankl
1974/75	17	(Austria) Hans Krankl	18	(Austria) Hans Krankl
1975/76	20	(Austria) Hans Krankl	27	(Austria) Hans Krankl
1976/77	32	(Austria) **Hans Krankl**	35	(Austria) Hans Krankl
1977/78	41	(Austria) **Hans Krankl**	42	(Austria) Hans Krankl
1978/79	11	(Socialist Federal Republic of Yugoslavia) Vukan Perović	11	(Austria) Geza Gallos (Socialist Federal Republic of Yugoslavia) Vukan Perović
1979/80	10	(Socialist Federal Republic of Yugoslavia) Vukan Perović	11	(Austria) Christian Keglevits
1980/81	16	(Austria) Christian Keglevits (Austria) Hans Krankl	18	(Austria) Christian Keglevits
1981/82	19	(Austria) Hans Krankl	23	(Austria) Hans Krankl
1982/83	23	(Austria) **Hans Krankl**	36	(Austria) Hans Krankl
1983/84	18	(Czechoslovakia) Antonín Panenka	26	(Austria) Hans Krankl
1984/85	17	(Socialist Federal Republic of Yugoslavia) Zlatko Kranjčar	30	(Austria) Hans Krankl
1985/86	23	(Socialist Federal Republic of Yugoslavia) Zlatko Kranjčar	26	(Socialist Federal Republic of Yugoslavia) Zlatko Kranjčar
1986/87	18	(Socialist Federal Republic of Yugoslavia) Zlatko Kranjčar	22	(Socialist Federal Republic of Yugoslavia) Zlatko Kranjčar
1987/88	27	(Socialist Federal Republic of Yugoslavia) **Zoran Stojadinović**	33	(Socialist Federal Republic of Yugoslavia) Zoran Stojadinović
1988/89	17	(Socialist Federal Republic of Yugoslavia) Zlatko Kranjčar	21	(Socialist Federal Republic of Yugoslavia) Zlatko Kranjčar
1989/90	17	(Norway) Jan Åge Fjørtoft	23	(Norway) Jan Åge Fjørtoft
1990/91	17	(Norway) Jan Åge Fjørtoft	21	(Norway) Jan Åge Fjørtoft
1991/92	16	(Norway) Jan Åge Fjørtoft	22	(Norway) Jan Åge Fjørtoft
1992/93	13	(Norway) Jan Åge Fjørtoft	19	(Norway) Jan Åge Fjørtoft
1993/94	9	(Poland) Andrzej Kubica	11	(Poland) Andrzej Kubica
1994/95	13	(Austria) Marcus Pürk	17	(Austria) Marcus Pürk
1995/96	15	(Austria) Christian Stumpf	20	(Austria) Christian Stumpf
1996/97	21	(Czech Republic) **René Wagner**	21	(Czech Republic) René Wagner
1997/98	7	(Slovakia) Marek Penksa (Austria) Marcus Pürk (Austria) Christian Stumpf	11	(Austria) Christian Stumpf
1998/99	10	(Czech Republic) René Wagner	15	(Czech Republic) René Wagner
1999/00	17	(Czech Republic) René Wagner	17	(Czech Republic) René Wagner
2000/01	11	(Austria) Roman Wallner	13	(Czech Republic) René Wagner (Austria) Roman Wallner
2001/02	15	(Austria) Roman Wallner	18	(Austria) Roman Wallner
2002/03	11	(Austria) Roman Wallner	11	(Austria) Roman Wallner
2003/04	10	(Germany) Steffen Hofmann (Czech Republic) René Wagner	11	(Czech Republic) René Wagner
2004/05	13	(Belgium) Axel Lawarée	15	(Belgium) Axel Lawarée
2005/06	11	(Czech Republic) Marek Kincl	13	(Czech Republic) Marek Kincl
2006/07	11	(Croatia) Mate Bilić	11	(Croatia) Mate Bilić
2007/08	10	(Austria) Erwin Hoffer (Germany) Steffen Hofmann	18	(Germany) Steffen Hofmann
2008/09	27	(Austria) Erwin Hoffer	29	(Austria) Erwin Hoffer
2009/10	20	(Germany) **Steffen Hofmann**	29	(Croatia) Nikica Jelavić
2010/11	18	(Albania) Hamdi Salihi	25	(Albania) Hamdi Salihi
2011/12	9	(Austria) Deni Alar	11	(Albania) Hamdi Salihi
2012/13	15	(Austria) Deni Alar	22	(Austria) Deni Alar
2013/14	15	(United States) Terrence Boyd	20	(United States) Terrence Boyd
2014/15	27	(Slovenia) Robert Berić	27	(Slovenia) Robert Berić
2015/16	8	(Austria) Stefan Schwab	11	(Austria) Florian Kainz (Austria) Philipp Schobesberger
2016/17	8	(Brazil) Joelinton	13	(Brazil) Joelinton
2017/18	12	(Austria) Stefan Schwab	13	(Georgia (country)) Giorgi Kvilitaia (Austria) Stefan Schwab
2018/19	7	(Austria) Thomas Murg	11	(Austria) Christoph Knasmüllner (Austria) Thomas Murg
2019/20	19	(Greece) Taxiarchis Fountas	20	(Greece) Taxiarchis Fountas
2020/21	15	(Austria) Ercan Kara	20	(Austria) Ercan Kara
2021/22	9	(Austria) Marco Grüll (Austria) Ercan Kara	16	(Austria) Marco Grüll
2022/23	21	(Austria) **Guido Burgstaller**	25	(Austria) Guido Burgstaller
2023/24	13	(Austria) Marco Grüll	21	(Austria) Marco Grüll
2024/25	10	(Croatia) Dion Drena Beljo	19	(Croatia) Dion Drena Beljo
2025/26	6	(Austria) Ercan Kara	8	(Austria) Ercan Kara
2026/27	8	(Austria) Ercan Kara	12	(Austria) Ercan Kara

== Appearances ==
For a ranking of league and total appearances see article List of SK Rapid Wien players

=== International appearances ===
Apps	Name	Rapid Wien career	Competitions
74	(Germany) Steffen Hofmann	2002–2005; 2006–2018	UEFA Champions League (15); UEFA Europa League/UEFA Cup (55); Intertoto Cup (4)
58	(Austria) Mario Sonnleitner	2010–2021	UEFA Champions League (4); UEFA Europa League (54)
56	(Austria) **Louis Schaub**	2012–2018; 2024–	UEFA Champions League (4); UEFA Europa League (30); UEFA Conference League (22)
50	(Austria) Peter Schöttel	1986–2001	UEFA Champions League/European Cup (14); UEFA Cup Winners' Cup (8); UEFA Cup (28)
48	(Austria) Maximilian Hofmann	2013–2024	UEFA Champions League (4); UEFA Europa League (36); UEFA Conference League (8)
46	(Austria) Rudolf Flögel	1958–1972	European Cup (16); UEFA Cup Winners' Cup (13); UEFA Cup (17); Inter-Cities Fairs Cup (2)
46	(Austria) Reinhard Kienast	1978–1992	European Cup (16); UEFA Cup Winners' Cup (13); UEFA Cup (17)
45	(Austria) Paul Halla	1953–1965	European Cup (21); UEFA Cup Winners' Cup (4); Inter-Cities Fairs Cup (6); Mitropa Cup (14)
45	(Austria) Hans Krankl	1970–1978; 1981–1986	European Cup (10); UEFA Cup Winners' Cup (21); UEFA Cup (14)
43	(Austria) **Niklas Hedl**	2021–	UEFA Europa League (6); UEFA Conference League (37)
43	(Austria) Heribert Weber	1978–1989	European Cup (16); UEFA Cup Winners' Cup (17); UEFA Cup (10)

=== Domestic cup appearances ===
Includes both the Austrian Cup and the German Tschammerpokal during the annexation of Austria from 1938 to 1945.

Apps	Name	Rapid Wien career
54	(Austria) Hans Krankl	1970–1978; 1981–1986
53	(Austria) Rudolf Flögel	1958–1972
53	(Austria) Reinhard Kienast	1978–1992
52	(Austria) Franz Binder	1930–1948
49	(Austria) Heribert Weber	1978–1989
47	(Austria) Josef Smistik	1926–1937
47	(Austria) Franz Wagner	1931–1943; 1944–1949
45	(Austria) Michael Konsel	1985–1997
44	(Austria) Rudolf Raftl	1931–1944
40	(Austria) Hans Pesser	1931–1942

=== Youngest and oldest players ===
Note: Some players in Rapid history have unknown birthdates and are therefore not considered in the following lists.

==== Youngest players ====
Name	Age	Date	Opponent	Result	Competition
(Austria) Andreas Ivanschitz	16 years and 11 days	26 October 1999	(Austria) ATSV Ranshofen	1–1 (1-4 p)	1999–2000 Austrian Cup
(Austria) Johann Bauer	16 years, 2 months and 11 days	2 September 1945	(Austria) Ostbahn XI	9–1	1945–46 Austrian football championship
(Austria) Hermann Dvoracek	16 years and 5 months	4 October 1936	(Austria) Admira Wien	0–0	1936–37 Austrian football championship
(Austria) Yusuf Demir	16 years, 6 months and 12 days	14 December 2019	(Austria) Admira Wacker	3–0	2019–20 Austrian Football Bundesliga
(Austria) Veli Kavlak	16 years, 6 months and 18 days	21 May 2005	Austria Salzburg	1–4	2004–05 Austrian Football Bundesliga
(Nazi Germany) Robert Grüneis	16 years, 8 months and 13 days	7 September 1941	(Nazi Germany) Wiener Sport-Club	2–1	1941–42 Gauliga Donau-Alpenland
(Austrian Empire) Gustav Wieser	16 years, 8 months and 18 days	14 March 1915	(Austrian Empire) Wiener AF	2–2	1914–15 Austrian football championship
(Austria) Franz Griftner	16 years, 10 months and 7 days	28 September 1924	(Austria) Hakoah Vienna	1–1	1928–29 Austrian football championship
(Nazi Germany) Gerald Schöbinger	16 years, 11 months and 11 days	21 February 1943	(Nazi Germany) FC Wien	4–6	1942-43 Gauliga Donau-Alpenland
(Austria) Friedrich Breitenfeldner	16 years, 11 months and 15 days	31 May 1997	(Austria) SK Sturm Graz	0–3	1996–97 Austrian Football Bundesliga

==== Oldest players ====
Name	Age	Date	Opponent	Result	Competition
(Nazi Germany) Josef Stehno	43 years, 1 month and 13 days	18 April 1943	(Nazi Germany) Sturm Graz	7–1	1942–43 Gauliga Donau-Alpenland
(Czech Republic) Ladislav Maier	39 years, 4 months and 25 days	29 May 2005	(Austria) Grazer AK	1–3	2004–05 Austrian Football Bundesliga
(Austria) Richard Kuthan	38 years, 2 months and 23 days	26 September 1929	(Hungary) Újpest FC	1–3 (a.e.t.)	1929 Mitropa Cup
(Germany) Steffen Hofmann	37 years, 8 months and 11 days	20 May 2018	(Austria) SCR Altach	4–1	2017–18 Austrian Football Bundesliga
(Austria) Franz Wagner	37 years, 8 months and 6 days	29 May 1949	Austria Wien	3–5	1948–49 Austrian football championship
(Czechoslovakia) František Veselý	37 years, 4 months and 14 days	21 April 1981	(Austria) LASK	4–0	1980–81 Austrian Football Bundesliga
(Austria) Franz Golobic	37 years, 2 months and 10 days	17 June 1959	(Austria) Grazer AK	3–0	1958–59 Austrian Cup
(Austria) Franz Binder	36 years, 11 months and 20 days	21 November 1948	(Austria) Feuerwehr Wien	4–1	1948–49 Austrian Cup
(Nazi Germany) Franz Fuchsberger	36 years, 11 months and 14 days	13 May 1944	(Nazi Germany) First Vienna	1–3	1943–44 Gauliga Donau-Alpenland
(Austria) Raimund Hedl	36 years, 8 months and 25 days	25 May 2011	(Austria) LASK	2–1	2010–11 Austrian Football Bundesliga

== Discipline ==
=== Most sending-offs ===
The column for straight red cards includes ejections prior to the use of cards.

Name	Rapid Wien career	Games	Red card	(yellow card) (red card)
(Austria) Robert Pecl	1986–1995	228	10	
(Austria) Peter Schöttel	1986–2001	527	6	2
(Austria) Josef Smistik	1926–1937	282	6	
(Austria) Reinhard Kienast	1978–1992	495	6	
(Czech Republic) René Wagner	1996–2004	261	4	2
(Austria) Maximilian Hofmann	2013–2024	273	3	3
(Austria) August Starek	1965–1967; 1970–1971; 1973–1977	162	5	
(Austria) Mario Sonnleitner	2010–2021	357	4	1
(Austria) Michael Hatz	1990–1996; 1998–2001	269	2	3
(Austria) Leopold Nitsch	1915–1928	230	4	
(Austria) Hans Krankl	1970–1978; 1981–1986	449	4	
(Greece) Andreas Lagonikakis	1999–2002	100	3	1
(Austria) Thomas Zingler	1996–2002	153	3	1
(Poland) Marcin Adamski	2002–2004; 2005–2006	126	2	2
(Germany) Oliver Freund	1997–2002	155	2	2
(Austria) Dietmar Kühbauer	1992–1997	177	2	2
(Austria) Guido Burgstaller	2011–2014; 2022–2025	214	2	2
(Austria) Christopher Drazan	2008–2012	144	1	3

=== Most yellow cards ===
Being booked twice for a send off is counted as 2 yellow cards in this statistic.

Name	Rapid Wien career	Games	Yellow card
(Austria) Peter Schöttel	1986–2001	527	129
(Austria) Maximilian Hofmann	2013–2024	273	83
(Austria) Michael Hatz	1990–1996; 1998–2001	269	70
(Austria) Robert Pecl	1986–1995	228	68
(Austria) Heribert Weber	1978–1989	410	68
(Germany) Steffen Hofmann	2002–2005; 2006–2018	540	66
(Austria) Reinhard Kienast	1978–1992	495	62
(Austria) Dietmar Kühbauer	1992–1997	177	58
(Austria) Stefan Kulovits	2002–2013	252	53
(Austria) Andreas Dober	2007–2013; 2017	179	51
(Austria) Guido Burgstaller	2011–2014; 2022–2025	214	51
(Austria) Markus Katzer	2004–2013	273	51

== European records ==
=== Non-UEFA competitions ===
Season	Competition	Round	Country	Club	Home	Away	Details
1927	Mitropa Cup	QF	(Kingdom of Yugoslavia)	Hajduk Split	8–1	1–0	
1927	Mitropa Cup	SF	(Czechoslovakia)	Slavia Prague	2–1	2–2	
1927	Mitropa Cup	Final	(Czechoslovakia)	Sparta Prague	2–1	2–6	
1928	Mitropa Cup	QF	(Hungary)	MTK Hungária FC	6–4	1–3	1–0 AET in play-off match
1928	Mitropa Cup	SF	(Czechoslovakia)	SK Viktoria Žižkov	3–2	3–4	3–1 in play-off match
1928	Mitropa Cup	Final	(Hungary)	Ferencvárosi TC	5–3	1–7	
1929	Mitropa Cup	QF	(Italy)	Genova 1893	5–1	0–0	
1929	Mitropa Cup	SF	(Hungary)	Újpest FC	3–2	1–3	1–3 AET in play-off match
1930	**Mitropa Cup**	QF	(Italy)	Genova 1893	6–1	1–1	
1930	**Mitropa Cup**	SF	(Hungary)	Ferencvárosi TC	5–1	0–1	
1930	**Mitropa Cup**	Final	(Czechoslovakia)	Sparta Prague	2–3	2–0	
1934	Mitropa Cup	1R	(Czechoslovakia)	Slavia Prague	1–1	3–1	
1934	Mitropa Cup	QF	(Italy)	AGC Bologna	4–1	1–6	
1935	Mitropa Cup	1R	(Czechoslovakia)	SK Židenice	2–2	2–3	
1936	Mitropa Cup	1R	(Italy)	AS Roma	3–1	1–5	
1951	**Zentropa Cup**	SF	(Italy)	S.S. Lazio	5–0		
1951	**Zentropa Cup**	Final	(Austria)	Wacker Wien	3–2		
1956	Mitropa Cup	QF	(Czechoslovakia)	Slovan Bratislava	3–0	1–3	
1956	Mitropa Cup	SF	(Hungary)	Vörös Lobogó	3–3	4–3	
1956	Mitropa Cup	Final	(Hungary)	Vasas Budapest	3–3	1–1	2–9 in play-off match
1957	Mitropa Cup	QF	(Hungary)	MTK Budapest	1–1	3–3	4–1 in play-off match
1957	Mitropa Cup	SF	(Socialist Federal Republic of Yugoslavia)	Vojvodina Novi Sad	3–0	1–4	Rapid Wien withdrew from play-off

=== UEFA competitions ===
Season	Competition	Round	Country	Club	Home	Away	Details
1955–56	European Cup	1R	(Netherlands)	PSV Eindhoven	6–1	0–1	
1955–56	European Cup	QF	(Italy)	Milan	1–1	2–7	
1956–57	European Cup	1R	(Spain)	Real Madrid	3–1	2–4	0–2 in playoff match in Madrid
1957–58	European Cup	1R	(Italy)	Milan	5–2	1–4	2–4 in playoff match in Zürich
1960–61	European Cup	1R	(Turkey)	Beşiktaş	4–0	0–1	
1960–61	European Cup	2R	(East Germany)	Wismut Karl-Marx-Stadt	3–1	0–2	1–0 in playoff match in Basel
1960–61	European Cup	QF	(Sweden)	Malmö FF	2–0	2–0	
1960–61	European Cup	SF	(Portugal)	Benfica	0–3	0–3	
1961–62	UEFA Cup Winners' Cup	1R	(Bulgaria)	Spartak Varna	0–0	5–2	
1961–62	UEFA Cup Winners' Cup	2R	(Italy)	Fiorentina	2–6	1–3	
1962–63	Fairs Cup	1R	(Socialist Federal Republic of Yugoslavia)	Crvena Zvezda	1–1	0–1	
1963–64	Fairs Cup	1R	(France)	Racing France	1–0	3–2	
1963–64	Fairs Cup	2R	(Spain)	Valencia	0–0	2–3	
1964–65	European Cup	1R	(Republic of Ireland)	Shamrock Rovers	3–0	2–0	
1964–65	European Cup	2R	(Scotland)	Rangers	0–2	0–1	
1966–67	UEFA Cup Winners' Cup	1R	(Turkey)	Galatasaray	4–0	5–3	
1966–67	UEFA Cup Winners' Cup	2R	(Soviet Union)	Spartak Moscow	1–0	1–1	
1966–67	UEFA Cup Winners' Cup	QF	(West Germany)	Bayern Munich	1–0	0–2 AET	
1967–68	European Cup	1R	(Turkey)	Beşiktaş	3–0	1–0	
1967–68	European Cup	2R	(West Germany)	Eintracht Braunschweig	1–0	0–2	
1968–69	European Cup	1R	(Norway)	Rosenborg	3–3	3–1	
1968–69	European Cup	2R	(Spain)	Real Madrid	1–0	1–2	
1968–69	European Cup	QF	(England)	Manchester United	0–0	0–3	
1969–70	UEFA Cup Winners' Cup	QR	(Soviet Union)	Torpedo Moscow	0–0	1–1	
1969–70	UEFA Cup Winners' Cup	1R	(Netherlands)	PSV	1–2	2–4	
1971–72	UEFA Cup	2R	(Socialist Federal Republic of Yugoslavia)	Dinamo Zagreb	0–0	2–2	
1971–72	UEFA Cup	3R	(Italy)	Juventus	0–1	1–4	
1972–73	UEFA Cup Winners' Cup	1R	(Greece)	PAOK	0–0	2–2	
1972–73	UEFA Cup Winners' Cup	2R	(Romania)	Rapid București	1–1	1–3	
1973–74	UEFA Cup Winners' Cup	1R	(Denmark)	Randers	2–1	0–0	
1973–74	UEFA Cup Winners' Cup	2R	(Italy)	Milan	0–2	0–0	
1974–75	UEFA Cup	1R	(Greece)	Aris Thessaloniki	3–1	0–1	
1974–75	UEFA Cup	2R	(Socialist Federal Republic of Yugoslavia)	Velez Mostar	1–1	0–1	
1975–76	UEFA Cup	1R	(Turkey)	Galatasaray	1–0	1–3	
1976–77	UEFA Cup Winners' Cup	1R	(Spain)	Atlético Madrid	1–2	1–1	
1977–78	UEFA Cup	1R	(Czechoslovakia)	TJ Internacionál Bratislava	1–0	0–3	
1978–79	UEFA Cup	1R	(Socialist Federal Republic of Yugoslavia)	Hajduk Split	2–1	0–2	
1979–80	UEFA Cup	1R	(Hungary)	Diósgyőri VTK	0–1	2–3	
1981–82	UEFA Cup	1R	(Hungary)	Fehérvár	2–2	2–0	
1981–82	UEFA Cup	2R	(Netherlands)	PSV	1–0	1–2	
1981–82	UEFA Cup	3R	(Spain)	Real Madrid	0–1	0–0	
1982–83	European Cup	1R	(Luxembourg)	Avenir Beggen	8–0	5–0	
1982–83	European Cup	2R	(Poland)	Widzew Łódź	2–1	3–5	
1983–84	European Cup	1R	(France)	Nantes	3–0	1–3	
1983–84	European Cup	2R	(Czechoslovakia)	Bohemians ČKD Praha	1–0	1–2	
1983–84	European Cup	QF	(Scotland)	Dundee United	2–1	0–1	
1984–85	UEFA Cup Winners' Cup	1R	(Turkey)	Beşiktaş	4–1	1–1	
1984–85	UEFA Cup Winners' Cup	2R	(Scotland)	Celtic	3–1	1–0	
1984–85	UEFA Cup Winners' Cup	QF	(East Germany)	Dynamo Dresden	5–0	0–3	
1984–85	UEFA Cup Winners' Cup	SF	(Soviet Union)	Dynamo Moscow	3–1	1–1	
1984–85	UEFA Cup Winners' Cup	Final	(England)	Everton	**1–3**		
1985–86	UEFA Cup Winners' Cup	1R	(Hungary)	Tatabanya Banyasz SC	5–0	1–1	
1985–86	UEFA Cup Winners' Cup	2R	(Iceland)	Fram Reykjavik	3–0	1–2	
1985–86	UEFA Cup Winners' Cup	QF	(Soviet Union)	Dynamo Kyiv	1–4	1–5	
1986–87	UEFA Cup Winners' Cup	1R	(Belgium)	FC Brügge	4–3	3–3	
1986–87	UEFA Cup Winners' Cup	2R	(East Germany)	Lokomotiv Leipzig	1–1	1–2 AET	
1987–88	European Cup	1R	(Malta)	Ħamrun Spartans	6–0	1–0	
1987–88	European Cup	2R	(Netherlands)	PSV	1–2	0–2	
1988–89	European Cup	1R	(Turkey)	Galatasaray	2–1	0–2	
1989–90	UEFA Cup	1R	(Scotland)	Aberdeen	1–0	1–2	
1989–90	UEFA Cup	2R	(Belgium)	FC Brügge	4–3	2–1	
1989–90	UEFA Cup	3R	(Belgium)	R.F.C. de Liège	1–0	1–3	
1990–91	UEFA Cup	1R	(Italy)	Inter Milan	2–1	1–3 AET	
1992–93	UEFA Cup	1R	(Ukraine)	Dynamo Kyiv	3–2	0–1	
1995–96	UEFA Cup Winners' Cup	1R	(Romania)	Petrolul Ploiești	3–1	0–0	
1995–96	UEFA Cup Winners' Cup	2R	(Portugal)	Sporting CP	4–0 AET	0–2	
1995–96	UEFA Cup Winners' Cup	QF	(Russia)	Dynamo Moscow	3–0	1–0	
1995–96	UEFA Cup Winners' Cup	SF	(Netherlands)	Feyenoord	3–0	1–1	
1995–96	UEFA Cup Winners' Cup	Final	(France)	Paris Saint-Germain	**0–1**		
1996–97	UEFA Champions League	1R	(Ukraine)	Dynamo Kyiv	2–0	4–2	
1996–97	UEFA Champions League	Group C (4th)	(Turkey)	Fenerbahçe	1–1	0–1	
1996–97	UEFA Champions League	Group C (4th)	(England)	Manchester United	0–2	0–2	
1996–97	UEFA Champions League	Group C (4th)	(Italy)	Juventus	1–1	0–5	
1997–98	UEFA Cup	2QR	(Czech Republic)	Boby Brno	6–1	0–2	
1997–98	UEFA Cup	1R	(Israel)	Hapoel Petah Tikva	1–0	1–1	
1997–98	UEFA Cup	2R	(Germany)	1860 Munich	3–0	1–2	
1997–98	UEFA Cup	3R	(Italy)	Lazio	0–2	0–1	
1998–99	UEFA Cup	2QR	(Cyprus)	Omonia Nicosia	2–0	1–3	
1998–99	UEFA Cup	1R	(France)	Bordeaux	1–2	1–1	
1999–2000	UEFA Champions League	2QR	(Malta)	Valletta	3–0	2–0	
1999–2000	UEFA Champions League	3QR	(Turkey)	Galatasaray	0–3	0–1	
1999–2000	UEFA Cup	1R	(Slovakia)	Inter Bratislava	1–2	0–1	
2000–01	UEFA Cup	QR	(Albania)	Teuta Durrës	2–0	4–0	
2000–01	UEFA Cup	1R	(Sweden)	Örgryte IS	3–0	1–1	
2000–01	UEFA Cup	2R	(Croatia)	NK Osijek	0–2	1–2	
2001–02	UEFA Cup	QR	(San Marino)	SS Cosmos	2–0	1–0	
2001–02	UEFA Cup	1R	(Serbia)	Partizan	5–1	0–1	
2001–02	UEFA Cup	2R	(France)	Paris Saint-Germain	2–2	0–4	
2004–05	UEFA Cup	QR	(Russia)	Rubin Kazan	0–2	3–0	
2004–05	UEFA Cup	1R	(Portugal)	Sporting CP	0–0	0–2	
2005–06	UEFA Champions League	2QR	(Luxembourg)	F91 Dudelange	3–2	6–1	
2005–06	UEFA Champions League	3QR	(Russia)	Lokomotiv Moscow	1–1	1–0	
2005–06	UEFA Champions League	Group A (4th)	(Germany)	Bayern Munich	0–1	0–4	
2005–06	UEFA Champions League	Group A (4th)	(Italy)	Juventus	1–3	0–3	
2005–06	UEFA Champions League	Group A (4th)	(Belgium)	FC Brügge	0–1	2–3	
2007–08	UEFA Intertoto Cup	2R	(Slovakia)	Slovan Bratislava	3–1	0–1	
2007–08	UEFA Intertoto Cup	3R	(Russia)	Rubin Kazan	3–1	0–0	
2007–08	UEFA Cup	2QR	(Georgia (country))	Dinamo Tbilisi	5–0	3–0	
2007–08	UEFA Cup	1R	(Belgium)	Anderlecht	0–1	1–1	
2008–09	UEFA Champions League	2QR	(Cyprus)	Anorthosis Famagusta	3–1	0–3	
2009–10	UEFA Europa League	2QR	(Albania)	Vllaznia Shkodër	5–0	3–0	
2009–10	UEFA Europa League	3QR	(Cyprus)	APOP Kinyras Peyias	2–1	2–2 AET	
2009–10	UEFA Europa League	Play-off	(England)	Aston Villa	1–0	1–2	
2009–10	UEFA Europa League	Group C (4th)	(Germany)	Hamburger SV	3–0	0–2	
2009–10	UEFA Europa League	Group C (4th)	(Scotland)	Celtic	3–3	1–1	
2009–10	UEFA Europa League	Group C (4th)	(Israel)	Hapoel Tel Aviv	0–3	1–5	
2010–11	UEFA Europa League	2QR	(Lithuania)	Sūduva Marijampolė	4–2	2–0	
2010–11	UEFA Europa League	3QR	(Bulgaria)	Beroe Stara Zagora	3–0	1–1	
2010–11	UEFA Europa League	Play-off	(England)	Aston Villa	1–1	3–2	
2010–11	UEFA Europa League	Group L (3rd)	(Portugal)	FC Porto	1–3	0–3	
2010–11	UEFA Europa League	Group L (3rd)	(Turkey)	Beşiktaş	1–2	0–2	
2010–11	UEFA Europa League	Group L (3rd)	(Bulgaria)	CSKA Sofia	1–2	2–0	
2012–13	UEFA Europa League	3QR	(Serbia)	Vojvodina Novi Sad	2–0	1–2	
2012–13	UEFA Europa League	Play-off	(Greece)	PAOK	3–0	1–2	
2012–13	UEFA Europa League	Group K (4th)	(Norway)	Rosenborg	1–2	2–3	
2012–13	UEFA Europa League	Group K (4th)	(Ukraine)	Metalist Kharkiv	1–0	0–2	
2012–13	UEFA Europa League	Group K (4th)	(Germany)	Bayer Leverkusen	0–4	0–3	
2013–14	UEFA Europa League	3QR	(Greece)	Asteras Tripolis	3–1	1–1	
2013–14	UEFA Europa League	Play-off	(Georgia (country))	Dila Gori	1–0	3–0	
2013–14	UEFA Europa League	Group G (3rd)	(Ukraine)	Dynamo Kyiv	2–2	1–3	
2013–14	UEFA Europa League	Group G (3rd)	(Belgium)	K.R.C. Genk	2–2	1–1	
2013–14	UEFA Europa League	Group G (3rd)	(Switzerland)	FC Thun	2–1	0–1	
2014–15	UEFA Europa League	Play-off	(Finland)	HJK Helsinki	3–3	1–2	
2015–16	UEFA Champions League	3QR	(Netherlands)	Ajax Amsterdam	2–2	3–2	
2015–16	UEFA Champions League	Play-off	(Ukraine)	Shakhtar Donetsk	0–1	2–2	
2015–16	UEFA Europa League	Group E (1st)	(Spain)	Villarreal CF	2–1	0–1	
2015–16	UEFA Europa League	Group E (1st)	(Czech Republic)	Viktoria Plzeň	3–2	2–1	
2015–16	UEFA Europa League	Group E (1st)	(Belarus)	Dinamo Minsk	2–1	1–0	
2015–16	UEFA Europa League	Round of 32	(Spain)	Valencia CF	0–4	0–6	
2016–17	UEFA Europa League	3QR	(Belarus)	Torpedo Zhodino	3–0	0–0	
2016–17	UEFA Europa League	Play-off	(Slovakia)	AS Trenčín	0–2	4–0	
2016–17	UEFA Europa League	Group F (3rd)	(Spain)	Athletic Bilbao	1–1	0–1	
2016–17	UEFA Europa League	Group F (3rd)	(Belgium)	K.R.C. Genk	3–2	0–1	
2016–17	UEFA Europa League	Group F (3rd)	(Italy)	Sassuolo Calcio	1–1	2–2	
2018–19	UEFA Europa League	3QR	(Slovakia)	Slovan Bratislava	4–0	1–2	
2018–19	UEFA Europa League	Play-off	(Romania)	Steaua București	3–1	1–2	
2018–19	UEFA Europa League	Group G (2nd)	(Spain)	Villarreal CF	0–0	0–5	
2018–19	UEFA Europa League	Group G (2nd)	(Russia)	Spartak Moscow	2–0	2–1	
2018–19	UEFA Europa League	Group G (2nd)	(Scotland)	Rangers	1–0	1–3	
2018–19	UEFA Europa League	Round of 32	(Italy)	Inter Milan	0–1	0–4	
2020–21	UEFA Champions League	2QR	(Croatia)	NK Lokomotiva	—N/a	1–0	
2020–21	UEFA Champions League	3QR	(Belgium)	K.A.A. Gent	—N/a	1–2	
2020–21	UEFA Europa League	Group B (3rd)	(England)	Arsenal F.C.	1–2	1–4	
2020–21	UEFA Europa League	Group B (3rd)	(Norway)	Molde FK	2–2	0–1	
2020–21	UEFA Europa League	Group B (3rd)	(Republic of Ireland)	Dundalk F.C.	4–3	3–1	
2021–22	UEFA Champions League	2QR	(Czech Republic)	Sparta Prague	2–1	0–2	
2021–22	UEFA Europa League	3QR	(Cyprus)	Anorthosis Famagusta	3–0	1–2	
2021–22	UEFA Europa League	Play-off	(Ukraine)	Zorya Luhansk	3–0	3–2	
2021–22	UEFA Europa League	Group H (3rd)	(Croatia)	Dinamo Zagreb	2–1	1–3	
2021–22	UEFA Europa League	Group H (3rd)	(Belgium)	K.R.C. Genk	0–1	1–0	
2021–22	UEFA Europa League	Group H (3rd)	(England)	West Ham United	0–2	0–2	
2021–22	UEFA Conference League	KO round	(Netherlands)	Vitesse Arnhem	2–1	0–2	
2022–23	UEFA Conference League	2QR	(Poland)	Lechia Gdańsk	0–0	2–1	
2022–23	UEFA Conference League	3QR	(Azerbaijan)	Neftçi PFK	2–0 AET	1–2	
2022–23	UEFA Conference League	Play-off	(Liechtenstein)	FC Vaduz	0–1	1–1	
2023–24	UEFA Conference League	3QR	(Hungary)	Debreceni VSC	0–0	5–0	
2023–24	UEFA Conference League	Play-off	(Italy)	ACF Fiorentina	1–0	0–2	
2024–25	UEFA Europa League	2QR	(Poland)	Wisła Kraków	6–1	2–1	
2024–25	UEFA Europa League	3QR	(Turkey)	Trabzonspor	2–0	1–0	
2024–25	UEFA Europa League	Play-off	(Portugal)	S.C. Braga	2–2	1–2	
2024–25	UEFA Conference League	League Phase (4th)	(Turkey)	İstanbul Başakşehir	—N/a	2–1	
2024–25	UEFA Conference League	League Phase (4th)	(Armenia)	FC Noah	1–0	—N/a	
2024–25	UEFA Conference League	League Phase (4th)	(Moldova)	Petrocub Hîncești	—N/a	3–0	
2024–25	UEFA Conference League	League Phase (4th)	(Republic of Ireland)	Shamrock Rovers	1–1	—N/a	
2024–25	UEFA Conference League	League Phase (4th)	(Cyprus)	AC Omonia	—N/a	1–3	
2024–25	UEFA Conference League	League Phase (4th)	(Denmark)	F.C. Copenhagen	3–0	—N/a	
2024–25	UEFA Conference League	Round of 16	(Bosnia and Herzegovina)	Borac Banja Luka	2–1 AET	1–1	
2024–25	UEFA Conference League	QF	(Sweden)	Djurgårdens IF	1–4 AET	1–0	
2025–26	UEFA Conference League	2QR	(Montenegro)	FK Dečić	4–2	2–0	
2025–26	UEFA Conference League	3QR	(Scotland)	Dundee United	2–2	2–2	5–4 on penalties
2025–26	UEFA Conference League	Play-off	(Hungary)	Győri ETO	2–0	1–2	
2025–26	UEFA Conference League	League Phase (36th)	(Poland)	Lech Poznań	—N/a	1–4	
2025–26	UEFA Conference League	League Phase (36th)	(Italy)	ACF Fiorentina	0–3	—N/a	
2025–26	UEFA Conference League	League Phase (36th)	(Romania)	Universitatea Craiova	0–1	—N/a	
2025–26	UEFA Conference League	League Phase (36th)	(Poland)	Raków Częstochowa	—N/a	1–4	
2025–26	UEFA Conference League	League Phase (36th)	(Cyprus)	AC Omonia	0–1	—N/a	
2025–26	UEFA Conference League	League Phase (36th)	(Bosnia and Herzegovina)	Zrinjski Mostar	—N/a	1–1	
2026–27	UEFA Conference League	2QR	(Andorra)	FC Santa Coloma	6–2	3–1	
2026–27	UEFA Conference League	3QR	(Estonia)	Paide Linnameeskond	2–0	4–1	
2026–27	UEFA Conference League	Play-off	(Scotland)	Heart of Midlothian	2–2	2–2	3–4 on penalties
