= 1917–18 SK Rapid Wien season =

Rapid Wien
1917–18 season
- Coach: Dionys Schönecker
- Stadium: Pfarrwiese, Vienna, Austria
- First class: 2nd
- Top goalscorer: Eduard Bauer (20)

The 1917–18 SK Rapid Wien season was the 20th season in club history.

== Squad ==
=== Squad statistics ===
Nat.	Name	League	
Nat.	Name	Apps	Goals
Goalkeepers
(Austrian Empire)	Theodor Mantler	1	
(Kingdom of Hungary (1867–1918))	Karoly Nemes	17	
Defenders
(Austrian Empire)	Franz Balzer	1	
(Austrian Empire)	Vinzenz Dittrich	16	4
(Austrian Empire)	Paul Irrl	1	
(Austrian Empire)	Willibald Stejskal	17	
(Austrian Empire)	Max Wanjura	1	
Midfielders
(Austrian Empire)	Josef Brandstetter	13	
(Austrian Empire)	Karl Czerny	5	
(Austrian Empire)	Leopold Grundwald	2	
(Austrian Empire)	Josef Hagler	11	
(Austrian Empire)	Josef Klima	7	
(Austrian Empire)	Leopold Nitsch	1	
(Austrian Empire)	Rudolf Rupec	17	
Forwards
(Austrian Empire)	Anton Aschenbrenner	2	
(Austrian Empire)	Eduard Bauer	15	20
(Austrian Empire)	Gustav Blaha	6	2
(Austrian Empire)	Dammböck	3	
(Austrian Empire)	Karl Jech	1	
(Austrian Empire)	Engelbert Klein	1	
(Austrian Empire)	Heinz Körner	10	4
(Austrian Empire)	Richard Kuthan	7	3
(Austrian Empire)	Hans Pasching	2	
(Austrian Empire)	Friedrich Stach	10	
(Austrian Empire)	Ferdinand Swatosch	8	8
(Austrian Empire)	Franz Twaroch	1	
(Austrian Empire)	Josef Uridil	4	1
(Austrian Empire)	Karl Wondrak	17	4
(Austrian Empire)	Zisek	1	

== Fixtures and results ==
Win Draw Loss

=== League ===
Rd	Date	Venue	Opponent	Res.	Goals and discipline
1	28.10.1917	H	Wiener AF	2-1	Blaha, Dittrich 73' (pen.)
2	26.09.1917	A	FAC	1-1	Swatosch 27'
3	02.09.1917	H	Wacker Wien	3-1	Bauer E. 15', Swatosch 21'
4	23.09.1917	A	Rudolfshügel	2-3	Bauer E. 31', Blaha 36'
5	08.09.1917	A	Simmering	3-2	Bauer E., Swatosch
6	14.10.1917	H	Wiener AC	3-3	Dittrich (pen.), Bauer E.
7	21.10.1917	A	Hertha Wien	1-1	Wondrak
8	11.11.1917	A	Amateure	0-1	
9	18.11.1917	H	Wiener SC	1-1	Dittrich 87' (pen.)
10	03.03.1918	A	Wiener AC	0-0	
11	10.03.1918	H	Rudolfshügel	2-4	Bauer E. 13', Körner H.
12	17.03.1918	H	Hertha Wien	5-2	Bauer E., Wondrak, Swatosch
13	24.03.1918	H	FAC	2-0	Swatosch 11' 61'
14	07.04.1918	A	Wiener AF	7-0	Kuthan 26' 66', Körner H. 41' 90', Bauer E. 61' 69', Swatosch 79'
15	21.04.1918	A	Wiener SC	1-0	Wondrak 65'
16	12.05.1918	H	Simmering	6-1	Uridil J. 38', Dittrich 43' (pen.), Bauer E. 46' 73' 77', Wondrak 66'
17	09.06.1918	A	Wacker Wien	1-1	Bauer E. 58'
18	23.06.1918	H	Amateure	6-1	Bauer E. 7' 12' 77' 86', Körner H. 59', Kuthan 89'
