= 1915–16 SK Rapid Wien season =

Rapid Wien
1915–16 season
- Coach: Dionys Schönecker
- Stadium: Pfarrwiese, Vienna, Austria
- First class: Champions (3rd title)
- Top goalscorer: Richard Kuthan (24)

The 1915–16 SK Rapid Wien season was the 18th season in club history.

== Squad ==
=== Squad statistics ===
Nat.	Name	League	
Nat.	Name	Apps	Goals
Goalkeepers
(Austrian Empire)	Josef Herschl	3	
(Austrian Empire)	Josef Koceny	6	
(Austrian Empire)	Franz Leuthe	9	
Defenders
(Austrian Empire)	Franz Balzer	11	
(Austrian Empire)	Fritz Brandstetter	1	
(Austrian Empire)	Robert Cimera	3	
(Austrian Empire)	Otto Eisenschimmel	3	
(Austrian Empire)	Eisler I	1	
(Austrian Empire)	Karl Harmer	1	
(Austrian Empire)	Josef Klima	4	
(Austrian Empire)	Oskar Krampf	4	
(Austrian Empire)	Josef Lukaschovsky	2	
(Austrian Empire)	Willibald Stejskal	4	
Midfielders
(Austrian Empire)	Josef Brandstetter	18	3
(Austrian Empire)	Josef Hagler	3	2
(Austrian Empire)	Karl Jech	2	
(Austrian Empire)	Knechtle	1	
(Austrian Empire)	Leopold Nitsch	11	
(Austrian Empire)	Gustav Putzendoppler	3	
(Austrian Empire)	Rudolf Rupec	13	
Forwards
(Austrian Empire)	Eduard Bauer	18	20
(Austrian Empire)	Johann Frassl	3	
(Austrian Empire)	Leopold Grundwald	18	12
(Austrian Empire)	Franz Kouba	2	
(Austrian Empire)	Heinz Körner	2	1
(Austrian Empire)	Richard Kuthan	17	24
(Austrian Empire)	Karl Oswald	5	2
(Austrian Empire)	Ferdinand Swatosch	6	5
(Austrian Empire)	Gustav Wieser	18	18
(Austrian Empire)	Karl Wondrak	6	

== Fixtures and results ==
Win Draw Loss

=== League ===
Rd	Date	Venue	Opponent	Res.	Goals and discipline
1	29.08.1915	A	Wacker Wien	5–1	Kuthan, Wieser, Bauer E.
2	05.12.1915	A	Amateure	4–0	Grundwald 55' 62', Oswald 65', Bauer E. 88'
3	12.09.1915	H	Hertha Wien	10–3	Bauer E., Grundwald, Kuthan
4	26.09.1915	H	Wiener AF	2–1	Kuthan 85', Wieser 87' (pen.)
5	24.10.1915	A	Rudolfshügel	3–3	Grundwald, Bauer E., Kuthan
6	31.10.1915	A	Wiener AC	2–5	Wieser 9'
7	14.11.1915	A	Wiener SC	4–2	Bauer E., Kuthan, Wieser 54', Swatosch 82'
8	21.11.1915	H	Simmering	8–0	Bauer E. 29', Kuthan, Wieser 61', Grundwald, Oswald 60'
9	12.12.1915	H	FAC	2–1	Kuthan 23' 31'
10	05.03.1916	H	Wiener SC	6–1	Brandstetter J. 2' (pen.) 17' (pen.), Kuthan, Wieser (pen.), Grundwald
11	12.03.1916	H	Wacker Wien	4–2	Grundwald 2', Bauer E. 23' 31', Kuthan 85'
12	16.04.1916	H	Rudolfshügel	2–0	Kuthan 30', Bauer E.
13	14.05.1916	A	Hertha Wien	8–1	Wieser, Kuthan 60', Grundwald, Bauer E.
14	21.05.1916	A	Wiener AF	1–2	Swatosch 82'
15	28.05.1916	A	FAC	3–2	Swatosch 10' 61', Bauer E. 32'
16	25.06.1916	A	Simmering	7–1	Wieser 42', Kuthan 51' 52' 58' 86', Brandstetter J. 71', Hagler 77'
17	02.07.1916	H	Amateure	9–0	Bauer E. 5' 78' 83', Körner H. 12', Hagler 17', Wieser 47' 61' 90', Grundwald 51'
18	16.07.1916	H	Wiener AC	7–1	Kuthan 4' 56' 85' (pen.), Wieser 12' 88' 90', Swatosch 57'
