= 1916–17 SK Rapid Wien season =

Rapid Wien
1916–17 season
- Coach: Dionys Schönecker
- Stadium: Pfarrwiese, Vienna, Austria
- First class: Champions (4th title)
- Top goalscorer: Eduard Bauer (21)

The 1916–17 SK Rapid Wien season was the 19th season in club history.

== Squad ==
=== Squad statistics ===
| Nat. | Name | League | |
| Nat. | Name | Apps | Goals |
Goalkeepers
| (Austrian Empire) | Theodor Mantler | 18 | |
Defenders
| (Austrian Empire) | Franz Balzer | 15 | 2 |
| (Austrian Empire) | Vinzenz Dittrich | 16 | 2 |
| (Austrian Empire) | Willibald Stejskal | 10 | |
Midfielders
| (Austrian Empire) | Josef Brandstetter | 5 | 1 |
| (Austrian Empire) | Josef Hagler | 17 | 1 |
| (Austrian Empire) | Josef Klima | 3 | |
| (Austrian Empire) | Leopold Nitsch | 5 | |
| (Austrian Empire) | Gustav Putzendoppler | 7 | |
| (Austrian Empire) | Rudolf Rupec | 17 | |
Forwards
| (Austrian Empire) | Rudolf Bachura | 10 | 5 |
| (Austrian Empire) | Eduard Bauer | 16 | 21 |
| (Austrian Empire) | Gustav Blaha | 4 | 1 |
| (Austrian Empire) | Karl Czerny | 6 | |
| (Austrian Empire) | Johann Frassl | 2 | |
| (Austrian Empire) | Leopold Grundwald | 8 | 7 |
| (Austrian Empire) | Engelbert Klein | 2 | 1 |
| (Austrian Empire) | Fritz Kovacs | 2 | |
| (Austrian Empire) | Heinz Körner | 1 | |
| (Austrian Empire) | Roman Mäder | 2 | |
| (Austrian Empire) | Karl Oswald | 2 | |
| (Austrian Empire) | Gustav Wieser | 13 | 14 |
| (Austrian Empire) | Karl Wondrak | 17 | 9 |

== Fixtures and results ==
Win Draw Loss

=== League ===
| Rd | Date | Venue | Opponent | Res. | Goals and discipline |
|---|---|---|---|---|---|
| 1 | 27.08.1916 | A | Rudolfshügel | 3-3 | Wieser 21', Bauer E. 46', Wondrak |
| 2 | 03.09.1916 | H | FAC | 2–1 | Bauer E. 5' 50' |
| 3 | 17.09.1916 | A | Hertha Wien | 7–1 | Grundwald 20' 88', Wieser 60' 75', Bachura 65' 70' 73' |
| 4 | 24.08.1916 | A | Wiener AC | 4–0 | Bachura 5', Grundwald, Wondrak, Wieser |
| 5 | 08.10.1916 | H | Amateure | 4–1 | Bauer E. 2', Wieser 10', Grundwald |
| 6 | 22.10.1916 | H | Simmering | 6–3 | Wieser 9', Bauer E. 23' 50' 68', Klein 40', Grundwald 73' |
| 7 | 29.10.1916 | H | Wiener AF | 1-1 | Grundwald 52' |
| 8 | 12.11.1916 | H | Wiener SC | 2–0 | Bauer E. 77' 78' |
| 9 | 19.11.1916 | A | Wacker Wien | 4-4 | Wondrak, Bauer E., Wieser |
| 10 | 04.03.1917 | H | Rudolfshügel | 2–4 | Wondrak 65', Wieser |
| 11 | 11.03.1917 | A | FAC | 1–2 | Wondrak 10' |
| 12 | 22.04.1917 | H | Hertha Wien | 8–0 | Bauer E., Wieser, Wondrak, Balzer |
| 13 | 15.04.1917 | H | Wiener AC | 3–1 | Bauer E. 47' 65', Wieser 85' |
| 14 | 29.04.1917 | A | Amateure | 2–1 | Balzer 8', Wieser 75' |
| 15 | 13.05.1917 | A | Simmering | 5–2 | Blaha, Dittrich (pen.), Bauer E., Bachura |
| 16 | 20.05.1917 | A | Wiener AF | 4–3 | Wondrak 19', Hagler 20', Bauer E. 40' 46' |
| 17 | 10.06.1917 | A | Wiener SC | 2–1 | Brandstetter J. 10', Wondrak 48' |
| 18 | 24.06.1917 | H | Wacker Wien | 4–0 | Bauer E. 15' 87', Dittrich 65' (pen.), Grundwald 89' |
