= 1918–19 SK Rapid Wien season =

Rapid Wien
1918–19 season
- Coach: Dionys Schönecker
- Stadium: Pfarrwiese, Vienna, Austria
- First class: Champions (5th title)
- Austrian Cup: Winner (1st title)
- Top goalscorer: League: Josef Uridil (14); All: Josef Uridil (28)

The 1918–19 SK Rapid Wien season was the 21st season in club history.

== Squad ==
=== Squad statistics ===
Nat.	Name	League		Cup		Total	
Nat.	Name	Apps	Goals	Apps	Goals	Apps	Goals
Goalkeepers
(Austria)	August Kraupar	7				7	
(France)	Maurice Lacollonge	1				1	
(Hungary)	Károly Nemes	10		4		14	
Defenders
(Austria)	Vinzenz Dittrich	16	4	3		19	4
(Austria)	Engelbert Klein	2				2	
(Austria)	Franz Schediwy	7		4		11	
(Austria)	Willibald Stejskal	11		1		12	
Midfielders
(Austria)	Leopold Nitsch	9		4		13	
(Austria)	Gustav Putzendoppler	18		4		22	
(Austria)	Rudolf Rupec	10		2		12	
Forwards
(Austria)	Eduard Bauer	15	11	3	1	18	12
(Austria)	Josef Brandstetter	17	1	2		19	1
(Austria)	Karl Czerny	1				1	
(Austria)	Leopold Grundwald	4		1	2	5	2
(Austria)	Heinz Körner	11	9			11	9
(Austria)	Richard Kuthan	9	8	3	2	12	10
(Austria)	Karl Oswald	2				2	
(Austria)	Friedrich Stach	2				2	
(Austria)	Ferdinand Swatosch	5	8	4	1	9	9
(Austria)	Josef Uridil	10	14	4	14	14	28
(Austria)	Gustav Wieser	17	7	4		21	7
(Austria)	Karl Wondrak	14	5	1	2	15	7

== Fixtures and results ==
Win Draw Loss

=== League ===
Rd	Date	Venue	Opponent	Res.	Att.	Goals and discipline
1	18.08.1918	A	Rudolfshügel	3-0	3,000	Wieser 30', Körner H. 75'
2	25.08.1918	A	Hertha Wien	2-1	1,000	Bauer E. 15' 50'
3	01.09.1918	A	Wiener SC	3-1		Körner H. 16' 77', Uridil J. 21'
4	24.11.1918	H	Wiener AF	3-1	3,000	Wondrak 42', Bauer E. 52', Dittrich 85' (pen.)
5	15.09.1918	A	Wacker Wien	3-0		Bauer E., Körner H. 43'
6	22.09.1918	H	Simmering	3-0	2,000	Körner H. 26' 66', Wieser 47'
7	29.09.1918	A	FAC	1-0		Körner H. 44'
8	13.10.1918	H	Amateure	1-2		Bauer E. 22'
9	17.11.1918	A	Wiener AC	2-2		Bauer E. 7' 47'
10	13.07.1919	A	Wiener AF	3-0		Uridil J. 63' 77', Swatosch 84'
11	09.03.1919	H	FAC	4-0	6,000	Kuthan 44' 61', Swatosch 62', Brandstetter J. 85'
12	23.03.1919	H	Rudolfshügel	7-1	4,500	Uridil J. 7' 26', Körner H. 17', Dittrich 39' (pen.) 78' (pen.), Kuthan 55' 70'
13	30.03.1919	A	Amateure	2-0	2,000	Wondrak 26', Uridil J. 72'
14	25.03.1919	H	Wiener SC	1-2		Bauer E. 43'
15	11.05.1919	H	Hertha Wien	8-1		Kuthan, Wieser, Swatosch 55', Uridil J. 60' 85', Wondrak 72'
16	25.05.1919	H	Wiener AC	4-2	8,000	Swatosch 32' 73', Dittrich (pen.), Wondrak 84'
17	01.06.1919	A	Simmering	9-2	5,000	Bauer E. 12' 46' 50', Wieser 30', Uridil J. 33' 71', Kuthan 34' 58', Wondrak
18	29.05.1919	H	Wacker Wien	8-0		Swatosch 24', Uridil J. 44' 57', Wieser

=== Cup ===
Rd	Date	Venue	Opponent	Res.	Att.	Goals and discipline
R1	23.02.1919	H	Bewegungsspieler	11-0		Uridil J., Wondrak, Grundwald
QF	16.03.1919	H	Wiener AF	2-1	3,000	Uridil J. 28', Bauer E. 30'
SF	27.04.1919	H	Rudolfshügel	6-2	10,000	Uridil J. 39' 62' 64', Swatosch 57', Kuthan 88'
F	06.07.1919	N	Wiener SC	3-0	12,000	Uridil J. 7' 53', Kuthan 85'
