= 1914–15 SK Rapid Wien season =

Rapid Wien
1914–15 season
- Coach: Dionys Schönecker
- Stadium: Pfarrwiese, Vienna, Austria
- First class: 3rd
- Top goalscorer: Eduard Bauer (8)

The 1914–15 SK Rapid Wien season was the 17th season in club history.

== Squad ==
=== Squad statistics ===
Nat.	Name	League		Discipline
Nat.	Name	Apps	Goals	Red card
Goalkeepers
(Austrian Empire)	Josef Koceny	1		
(Austrian Empire)	Gustav Krainer	2		
(Austrian Empire)	Franz Leuthe	6		
Defenders
(Austrian Empire)	Franz Balzer	3		
(Austrian Empire)	Fritz Brandstetter	7		
(Austrian Empire)	Franz Kux	1		
(Austrian Empire)	Hans Pichler	1		
(Austrian Empire)	Aladar Ronnert	1		
(Austrian Empire)	Franz Scheiböck	1		
(German Empire)	Leopold Schölley	1		
(Austrian Empire)	Willibald Stejskal	4		
(Austrian Empire)	Hans Werner	1		
Midfielders
(Austrian Empire)	Josef Brandstetter	4	2	
(Austrian Empire)	Robert Cimera	3		
(Austrian Empire)	Josef Hagler	1		
(Austrian Empire)	Josef Klima	2		
(Austrian Empire)	Leopold Nitsch	8		
(Austrian Empire)	Franz Schediwy	9		1
Forwards
(Austrian Empire)	Eduard Bauer	7	8	
(Austrian Empire)	Gustav Blaha	3	1	
(Austrian Empire)	Johann Frassl	3		
(Austrian Empire)	Hans Geiger	1		
(Austrian Empire)	Leopold Grundwald	3		
(Austrian Empire)	Heinz Körner	3	1	
(Austrian Empire)	Richard Kuthan	7	7	
(Austrian Empire)	Sebastian Ropausch	1		
(Austrian Empire)	Rudolf Rupec	4		
(Austrian Empire)	Ferdinand Swatosch	6	2	
(Austrian Empire)	Gustav Wieser	8	1	
(Austrian Empire)	Karl Wondrak	4		

== Fixtures and results ==
Win Draw Loss

=== League ===
Rd	Date	Venue	Opponent	Res.	Goals and discipline
1	28.02.1915	H	Hertha Wien	3-1	Bauer E., Blaha
2	14.03.1915	A	Wiener AF	2-2	Bauer E. 78', Kuthan 82' (pen.); Schediwy F. (red card)
3	21.03.1915	H	Wiener AC	0-2	
4	11.04.1915	H	Wacker Wien	2-2	Körner H. 30', Swatosch
5	18.04.1915	H	Rudolfshügel	2-3	Bauer E., Dusil (o.g.)
6	09.05.1915	H	FAC	3-1	Swatosch 3', Kuthan
7	16.05.1915	H	Wiener SC	0-1	
8	13.06.1915	H	Simmering	7-3	Bauer E., Wieser (pen.), Kuthan, Brandstetter J.
9	27.06.1915	H	Amateure	4-1	Brandstetter J., Kuthan, Bauer E.
