= 1919–20 SK Rapid Wien season =

Rapid Wien
1919–20 season
- Coach: Dionys Schönecker
- Stadium: Pfarrwiese, Vienna, Austria
- First class: Champions (6th title)
- Austrian Cup: Winner (2nd title)
- Top goalscorer: League: Josef Uridil (21); All: Josef Uridil (27)

The 1919–20 SK Rapid Wien season was the 22nd season in club history.

== Squad ==
=== Squad statistics ===
Nat.	Name	League		Cup		Total	
Nat.	Name	Apps	Goals	Apps	Goals	Apps	Goals
Goalkeepers
(Austria)	August Kraupar	21		5		26	
(Austria)	Julius Tomsche	1				1	
Defenders
(Austria)	Vinzenz Dittrich	20	2	4		24	2
(Austria)	Franz Schediwy	17		5		22	
Midfielders
(Austria)	Josef Brandstetter	19		5		24	
(Austria)	Leopold Nitsch	22		5		27	
(Austria)	Gustav Putzendoppler	19		2		21	
(Austria)	Karl Putzendoppler	3				3	
Forwards
(Austria)	Hans Baron	1				1	
(Austria)	Eduard Bauer	17	12	3	1	20	13
(Austria)	Leopold Grundwald	7		4		11	
(Austria)	Engelbert Klein	1				1	
(Austria)	Heinz Körner	3	1	2	3	5	4
(Austria)	Richard Kuthan	22	6	5	4	27	10
(Austria)	Franz Rölle	5				5	
(Austria)	Rudolf Rupec	5				5	
(Austria)	Sittler	1	1			1	1
(Austria)	Friedrich Stach	1		1		2	
(Austria)	Josef Uridil	14	21	4	6	18	27
(Austria)	Gustav Wieser	21	18	5	6	26	24
(Austria)	Karl Wondrak	22	10	5	3	27	13

== Fixtures and results ==
Win Draw Loss

=== League ===
Rd	Date	Venue	Opponent	Res.	Att.	Goals and discipline
1	24.08.1919	H	Amateure	1-2		Kuthan 70'
2	14.09.1919	A	Wiener SC	7-0		Wieser 20' 87', Bauer E. 25' 53' 82', Uridil J. 59' 85'
3	21.09.1919	H	Wiener AF	4-2		Uridil J. 10' 26' 88', Dittrich (pen.)
4	28.09.1919	A	FAC	0-1		
5	12.10.1919	H	Vienna	1-1		Kuthan 82'
6	26.10.1919	A	Rudolfshügel	2-4	10,000	Dittrich 63' (pen.), Wondrak 80'
7	07.12.1919	H	Simmering	2-1		Bauer E. 76', Wondrak 81'
8	16.11.1919	A	Hertha Wien	2-1		Wieser 48' 51'
9	23.11.1919	A	Admira	5-2		Wieser 69' 87', Kuthan 79', Sittler
10	30.11.1919	H	Wiener AC	4-2	5,000	Wondrak 15' 46', Wieser 70' (pen.), Kuthan 80'
11	09.11.1919	H	Wacker Wien	9-2		Bauer E. 25' 77', Wieser 46' 71' (pen.) 72' 84' 87', Wondrak 51' 81'
12	29.02.1920	H	Wiener SC	1-0	7,000	Uridil J. 14'
13	07.03.1920	H	FAC	2-0	5,000	Kuthan 19', Uridil J.
14	21.03.1920	H	Hertha Wien	4-1		Uridil J. 5' 78', Körner H. 45', Wieser
15	28.03.1920	A	Wiener AC	0-0	8,000	
16	18.04.1920	A	Wiener AF	0-2	6,000	
17	25.04.1920	A	Amateure	3-2	15,000	Wondrak 40', Kuthan 55', Bauer E. 85'
18	09.05.1920	H	Rudolfshügel	3-1	6,000	Uridil J. 8' 71', Wondrak 15'
19	16.05.1920	A	Vienna	1-1	5,000	Uridil J. 48'
20	20.06.1920	H	Admira	11-2		Wieser 11' 63' 72', Bauer E. 15' 33' 44', Uridil J. 27' 37' 39' 53', Wondrak 90'
21	06.06.1920	A	Simmering	5-2	6,000	Wondrak 8', Uridil J. 33' 61', Bauer E. 60' 88'
22	29.06.1920	A	Wacker Wien	4-0	8,500	Uridil J. 22' 52' 58', Wieser 88'

=== Cup ===
Rd	Date	Venue	Opponent	Res.	Att.	Goals and discipline
R1	08.02.1920	H	Admira	5-1		Kuthan 4' 7', Uridil J. 32' 42', Wieser 76'
R16	14.03.1920	H	Red Star	10-0		Körner H. 1' 60' 62', Uridil J. 7' 32', Wondrak 34' 45', Kuthan 51', Wieser 70' 82'
QF	13.05.1920	A	Rudolfshügel	2-1		Wieser 8', Uridil J. 40'
SF	23.06.1920	H	Wiener SC	1-0	5,000	Wieser 44' (pen.)
F	04.07.1920	N	Amateure	5-2	25,000	Wondrak 8', Bauer E. 25', Uridil J. 30', Kuthan 84', Wieser 89'
