= 1913–14 SK Rapid Wien season =

Rapid Wien
1913–14 season
- Coach: Dionys Schönecker
- Stadium: Pfarrwiese, Vienna, Austria
- First class: 2nd
- Top goalscorer: Richard Kuthan (13)

The 1913–14 SK Rapid Wien season was the 16th season in club history.

== Squad ==
=== Squad statistics ===
Nat.	Name	League	
Nat.	Name	Apps	Goals
Goalkeepers
(Austrian Empire)	Josef Kaltenbrunner	14	0
(Austrian Empire)	Gustav Krainer	4	0
Defenders
(Austrian Empire)	Franz Balzer	9	0
(Austrian Empire)	Fritz Brandstetter	7	0
(Austrian Empire)	Vinzenz Dittrich	13	6
Midfielders
(Austrian Empire)	Josef Brandstetter	18	4
(Austrian Empire)	Josef Hagler	13	1
(Austrian Empire)	Karl Jech	11	1
(Austrian Empire)	Josef Klima	2	1
(Austrian Empire)	Richard Köhler	9	0
(Austrian Empire)	Gustav Putzendoppler	2	0
(Austrian Empire)	Franz Schediwy	6	0
Forwards
(Austrian Empire)	Eduard Bauer	15	3
(Austrian Empire)	Gustav Blaha	14	5
(Austrian Empire)	Leopold Grundwald	18	10
(Austrian Empire)	Heinz Körner	18	5
(Austrian Empire)	Richard Kuthan	17	13
(Austrian Empire)	Rudolf Rupec	1	1
(Austrian Empire)	Josef Schediwy	2	0
(Austrian Empire)	Karl Wondrak	5	1

== Fixtures and results ==
Win Draw Loss

=== League ===
Rd	Date	Venue	Opponent	Res.	Goals and discipline
1	31.08.1913	H	Amateure	4-0	Brandstetter J. 15', Grundwald 38' 85', Klima 77'
2	14.09.1913	A	Vienna	5-0	Kuthan 20' 56' 66', Grundwald 64', Dittrich (pen.)
3	28.09.1913	H	Rudolfshügel	6-4	Blaha 20' 90', Bauer E. 21', Kuthan 60', Dittrich 76' (pen.), Hagler 83'
4	12.10.1913	H	Wiener AF	2-2	Bauer E. 55', Jech 60'
5	19.10.1913	A	FAC	2-2	Grundwald 10', Dittrich 18' (pen.)
6	01.11.1913	H	Wiener SC	2-0	Dittrich 59' (pen.), Kuthan 73'
7	09.11.1913	H	Simmering	4-2	Grundwald 44', Dittrich 57' (pen.), Brandstetter J. 60', Blaha 61'
8	15.11.1913	H	Wiener AC	2-2	Grundwald 17', Blaha 75'
9	23.11.1913	H	Hertha Wien	4-2	Blaha, Kuthan 52', Bauer E. 50'
10	29.03.1914	A	Wiener SC	1-2	Grundwald 16'
11	10.05.1914	A	Wiener AC	1-1	Körner H. 43'
12	15.03.1914	H	Vienna	3-1	Rupec 42', Körner H. 43' 89'
13	25.03.1914	A	Hertha Wien	3-2	Kuthan 14', Brandstetter J. 73' 74' (pen.)
14	11.06.1914	A	Amateure	2-1	Kuthan 24', Dittrich (pen.)
15	19.04.1914	H	FAC	7-2	Grundwald 22' 61' 68', Körner H. 55', Wondrak 59', Kuthan 67' 77'
16	26.04.1914	A	Rudolfshügel	1-0	Kuthan 50'
17	28.06.1914	A	Simmering	1-2	Kuthan 77'
18	17.05.1914	A	Wiener AF	1-1	Körner H. 8'
