= 1920–21 SK Rapid Wien season =

Rapid Wien
1920–21 season
- Coach: Dionys Schönecker
- Stadium: Pfarrwiese, Vienna, Austria
- First class: Champions (7th title)
- Austrian Cup: 1st round
- Top goalscorer: League: Josef Uridil (35); All: Josef Uridil (35)
- Highest home attendance: 15,000
- Lowest home attendance: 700
- Average home league attendance: 7,100

The 1920–21 SK Rapid Wien season was the 23rd season in club history.

== Squad ==
=== Squad statistics ===
Nat.	Name	League		Cup		Total	
Nat.	Name	Apps	Goals	Apps	Goals	Apps	Goals
Goalkeepers
(Austria)	Anton Bujnoch			1		1	
(Austria)	August Kraupar	21		1		22	
(Austria)	Julius Tomsche	3				3	
Defenders
(Austria)	Vinzenz Dittrich	21		2		23	
(Austria)	Hans Geiger	1				1	
(Austria)	Johann Nießner	2				2	
(Austria)	Franz Schediwy	5				5	
(Austria)	Franz Schlosser	4				4	
(Austria)	Stefan Sudrich	3		1		4	
(Austria)	Hans Werner	1				1	
Midfielders
(Austria)	Hans Beran	5				5	
(Austria)	Josef Brandstetter	24		2		26	
(Austria)	Josef Dworak	1				1	
(Austria)	Karl Klär	20		2		22	
(Austria)	Leopold Nitsch	23		2		25	
Forwards
(Austria)	Eduard Bauer	21	13	1	1	22	14
(Austria)	Leopold Grundwald	11		1		12	
(Austria)	Heinz Körner	10	2			10	2
(Austria)	Richard Kuthan	24	19	2	2	26	21
(Austria)	Josef Uridil	22	35	2		24	35
(Austria)	Ferdinand Wesely	7	1	1		8	1
(Austria)	Gustav Wieser	5	4			5	4
(Austria)	Leopold Witka	7	3	2	1	9	4
(Austria)	Karl Wondrak	23	8	2		25	8

== Fixtures and results ==
Win Draw Loss

=== League ===
Rd	Date	Venue	Opponent	Res.	Att.	Goals and discipline
1	05.09.1920	A	Hertha Wien	2-2		Uridil J. 31' 42'
2	12.09.1920	A	Wacker Wien	3-3	5,000	Wieser 35', Uridil J. 49', Bauer E. 63'
3	19.09.1920	A	Rudolfshügel	3-4	9,000	Körner H. 15', Uridil J. 35', Kuthan 59'
4	03.10.1920	A	Simmering	2-1		Wieser 25', Uridil J. 75'
5	10.10.1920	H	Wiener SC	6-0	6,000	Uridil J. 5' 76', Wieser 43' 90', Kuthan 45', Bauer E. 46'
7	24.10.1920	H	Amateure	1-0	10,000	Uridil J. 41'
8	14.11.1920	A	Hakoah	1-1	20,000	Uridil J. 60'
9	21.11.1920	H	Wiener AF	4-2	3,000	Armesberger 38' (o.g.), Uridil J. 39' 44' 87'
10	28.11.1920	H	FAC	4-1	2,000	Kuthan 64' 68' 77', Wondrak 72'
11	05.12.1920	A	Vienna	8-2	2,000	Wondrak (pen.), Uridil J. 31' 36', Bauer E. (pen.), Kuthan
12	12.12.1920	H	Admira	4-2	700	Bauer E. 16', Uridil J. 20', Wondrak 27', Kuthan 68'
13	02.01.1921	A	Wiener AC	9-0	18,000	Körner H. 7', Uridil J. 9', Kuthan 29' 52' 72' (pen.), Bauer E. 47' 87' (pen.) 89', Wondrak 75'
14	14.05.1921	H	Simmering	2-2	15,000	Uridil J. 12' 36'
15	20.02.1921	H	Hakoah	1-0	12,000	Wondrak 31'
16	06.03.1921	A	Admira	3-1	3,500	Uridil J. 34', Witka 36', Kuthan 40'
17	13.03.1921	A	FAC	3-3	15,000	Bauer E. 44', Kuthan 78', Wesely 85'
18	03.04.1921	H	Rudolfshügel	5-3	10,000	Bauer E. 43' 74', Kuthan 44', Uridil J. 79', Witka 81'
19	10.04.1921	H	Wiener AC	7-5	4,000	Uridil J. 8' 20' 55' 67' 72' 77' 89'
20	29.06.1921	A	Amateure	1-1	25,000	Uridil J. 71'
21	15.06.1921	H	Wacker Wien	4-0	5,000	Bauer E. 1' 20', Uridil J. 65' 82'
22	26.06.1921	H	Hertha Wien	4-1	8,000	Uridil J. (pen.), Wondrak, Kuthan
23	22.05.1921	A	Wiener SC	3-2	10,000	Uridil J. 31', Wondrak, Kuthan
24	29.05.1921	H	Vienna	3-2	10,000	Kuthan 28' 42', Wondrak 71'
25	20.03.1921	A	Wiener AF	3-1	5,000	Kuthan, Witka

=== Cup ===
Rd	Date	Venue	Opponent	Res.	Att.	Goals and discipline
R1	27.02.1921	H	Amateure	3-3 (a.e.t.)	15,000	Witka, Kuthan, Bauer E.
R1-PO	08.03.1921	H	Amateure	1-2	12,000	Kuthan 8'
