= 1921–22 SK Rapid Wien season =

Rapid Wien
1921–22 season
- Coach: Dionys Schönecker
- Stadium: Pfarrwiese, Vienna, Austria
- First class: 3rd
- Austrian Cup: 1st round
- Top goalscorer: League: Richard Kuthan (21); All: Richard Kuthan (21)
- Highest home attendance: 25,000
- Lowest home attendance: 5,000
- Average home league attendance: 13,400

The 1921–22 SK Rapid Wien season was the 24th season in club history.

== Squad ==
=== Squad statistics ===
Nat.	Name	League		Cup		Total	
Nat.	Name	Apps	Goals	Apps	Goals	Apps	Goals
Goalkeepers
(Austria)	Ernst Pauler	24		1		25	
Defenders
(Austria)	Rudolf Beran			1		1	
(Austria)	Vinzenz Dittrich	13				13	
(Austria)	Eisler II	2				2	
(Austria)	Franz Schediwy	6				6	
(Austria)	Willibald Stejskal	8	1			8	1
Midfielders
(Austria)	Hans Beran	2				2	
(Austria)	Josef Brandstetter	23	1	1		24	1
(Austria)	Franz Machek	1				1	
(Austria)	Leopold Nitsch	16		1		17	
Forwards
(Austria)	Eduard Bauer	15	7			15	7
(Austria)	Leopold Grundwald	7	1			7	1
(Austria)	Karl Klär	20	1	1		21	1
(Germany)	Josef Klupp	1				1	
(Austria)	Richard Kuthan	24	21	1		25	21
(Austria)	Julius Lerch			1		1	
(Austria)	Karl Neubauer	11	1	1		12	1
(Austria)	Franz Schlosser	18		1		19	
(Austria)	Josef Uridil	21	19			21	19
(Austria)	Ferdinand Wesely	23	13	1	1	24	14
(Austria)	Leopold Witka	12	2			12	2
(Austria)	Karl Wondrak	17	5	1		18	5

== Fixtures and results ==
Win Draw Loss

=== League ===
Rd	Date	Venue	Opponent	Res.	Att.	Goals and discipline
1	28.08.1921	H	Wacker Wien	4-0	8,000	Kuthan 41' (pen.) 80', Uridil J. 43', Wesely 68'
2	10.09.1921	A	Wiener AF	6-2	5,000	Wondrak 18' 30', Kuthan 50' (pen.) 66' 77', Wesely 75'
3	08.09.1921	A	Rudolfshügel	1-0	15,000	Wondrak 58'
5	02.10.1921	H	FAC	6-4	15,000	Uridil J. 5' 63' 70' 78', Grundwald 32', Kuthan 75'
6	09.10.1921	A	Hakoah	2-2	22,000	Brandstetter J. 20', Uridil J.
7	27.11.1921	A	Hertha Wien	4-3	5,000	Wesely 43', Uridil J., Kuthan, Wondrak
8	08.12.1921	A	Amateure	3-2	18,000	Klär 37', Wesely 44', Uridil J. 60'
9	08.01.1922	H	Wiener SC	1-5	18,000	Uridil J. 86'
10	12.11.1921	A	Ostmark	3-5	5,000	Wesely 40', Wondrak 47', Uridil J.
11	20.11.1921	H	Simmering	4-1	5,000	Witka 22', Wesely 35' 38' 40'
12	04.12.1921	A	Admira	1-3	5,000	Kuthan
13	10.12.1921	A	Vienna	1-3	5,000	Uridil J. 83'
14	31.05.1922	A	Wacker Wien	1-0	15,000	Kuthan 45'
15	12.03.1922	H	Admira	10-2	17,000	Uridil J. 20' 43', Kuthan 22' 30' 60', Bauer E. 48' 65', Neubauer 50' (pen.), Wesely 89'
16	05.03.1922	H	Amateure	2-1	20,000	Kuthan 22' 36'
18	02.04.1922	A	Wiener SC	2-3	40,000	Kuthan 37', Wesely 39'
19	09.04.1922	H	Hakoah	1-3	25,000	Uridil J. 34' (pen.)
20	07.05.1922	A	Simmering	2-0	8,000	Uridil J. 70', Bauer E. 90'
21	14.05.1922	H	Hertha Wien	1-1	10,000	Uridil J. 72'
22	28.05.1922	H	Wiener AF	4-1	14,000	Uridil J. 10' 52', Kuthan, Witka
23	04.06.1922	A	FAC	1-1	12,000	Bauer E. 58'
24	22.06.1922	H	Ostmark	7-1	7,000	Kuthan 6' 55' 80', Wesely 12' 51', Bauer E. 28'
25	25.05.1922	H	Vienna	4-1	10,000	Kuthan 44' 52', Uridil J. 47', Wesely 70'
26	01.07.1922	H	Rudolfshügel	1-2	12,000	Stejskal (pen.)

=== Cup ===
Rd	Date	Venue	Opponent	Res.	Att.	Goals and discipline
R1	19.03.1922	H	Red Star	1-2	10,000	Wesely 19'
