= 1922–23 SK Rapid Wien season =

Rapid Wien
1922–23 season
- Coach: Dionys Schönecker
- Stadium: Pfarrwiese, Vienna, Austria
- First class: Champions (8th title)
- Austrian Cup: Semifinal
- Top goalscorer: League: Josef Uridil (15); All: Richard Kuthan (16)
- Highest home attendance: 50,000
- Lowest home attendance: 4,000
- Average home league attendance: 18,500

The 1922–23 SK Rapid Wien season was the 25th season in club history.

== Squad ==
=== Squad statistics ===
Nat.	Name	League		Cup		Total		Discipline
Nat.	Name	Apps	Goals	Apps	Goals	Apps	Goals	Red card
Goalkeepers
(Austria)	Rudolf Moche	2				2		
(Austria)	Ernst Pauler	13		4		17		
(Austria)	Ignaz Tiller	9				9		
Defenders
(Austria)	Vinzenz Dittrich	8				8		
(Austria)	Alexander Popovich	13		1		14		
(Austria)	Emil Regnard	14		4		18		
(Austria)	Willibald Stejskal	6		3		9		
Midfielders
(Austria)	Josef Brandstetter	24	7	4	2	28	9	
(Austria)	Karl Klär	15		1		16		
(Austria)	Franz Machek	9		3		12		
(Austria)	Leopold Nitsch	24		4		28		
Forwards
(Austria)	Eduard Bauer	9	4	1	1	10	5	
(Austria)	Heinrich Budin	2		1		3		
(Austria)	Thomas Chalupsky	1				1		
(Austria)	Willibald Kirbes	6	2	1		7	2	
(Austria)	Richard Kuthan	22	14	4	2	26	16	
(Austria)	Johann Richter	19	12	4	2	23	14	
(Austria)	Franz Schlosser	10	2	2	2	12	4	
(Austria)	Josef Uridil	10	15			10	15	
(Austria)	Ferdinand Wesely	18	11	4	3	22	14	1
(Austria)	Leopold Witka	8	3			8	3	
(Austria)	Karl Wondrak	22	6	3	2	25	8	

== Fixtures and results ==
Win Draw Loss

=== League ===
Rd	Date	Venue	Opponent	Res.	Att.	Goals and discipline
1	03.09.1922	A	Rudolfshügel	5-1	15,000	Wondrak 15', Wesely 25', Kuthan 43' 90', Witka 77'
2	01.11.1922	A	Hakoah	3-2	25,000	Uridil J. 24' 53' 61'
3	17.09.1922	A	Vienna	8-0	40,000	Witka 9', Brandstetter J. 17', Kuthan 28' 77', Richter 39' 46', Wesely 40' 79'
4	12.11.1922	A	Wiener SC	2-0	30,000	Kuthan 31', Wesely 88'
5	08.10.1922	A	Simmering	1-1	15,000	Kuthan 57'
6	29.10.1922	H	Hertha Wien	3-3	18,000	Brandstetter J. 50', Uridil J. 55' 67'
8	05.11.1922	A	Admira	1-0	12,000	Weigl 82' (o.g.)
9	19.11.1922	H	Wiener AF	2-2	16,000	Uridil J. 29' 87'
10	15.10.1922	H	Amateure	3-7	50,000	Bauer E. 9', Wondrak 88' (pen.)
11	14.01.1923	H	Wacker Wien	6-2	18,000	Schlosser 1', Richter 5' 40' 71', Kuthan 26' 88' (pen.)
12	31.12.1922	H	FAC	6-4	15,000	Richter 26' 61', Wondrak 40' 71', Brandstetter J. 49', Kuthan 74'
13	17.12.1922	H	Wiener AC	2-2	10,000	Uridil J. 49', Wondrak 72'
14	18.02.1923	A	Hertha Wien	4-3	20,000	Richter 7', Schlosser 27' (pen.), Wesely 57', Sevcik 72' (o.g.)
15	20.06.1923	H	Admira	5-1	8,000	Uridil J. 4' 10' 23', Richter 19'
16	09.05.1923	H	Hakoah	1-1	20,000	Kuthan
17	25.03.1923	H	Rudolfshügel	6-0	20,000	Wesely 22' 70' 90', Richter 46', Kuthan 62', Bauer E. 66'
18	07.07.1923	H	Simmering	3-4	10,000	Kuthan 15', Bauer E. 80', Uridil J. 88'
19	22.04.1923	A	Wiener AC	2-0	25,000	Kuthan 12', Wesely 40'
21	27.05.1923	A	Wiener AF	4-2	12,000	Brandstetter J. (pen.), Wesely 54' 64' (pen.), Richter 67'
22	03.06.1923	A	Amateure	0-3	30,000	Wesely (red card) 30'
23	10.06.1923	A	Wacker Wien	1-1	18,000	Brandstetter J. 75'
24	17.06.1923	H	Wiener SC	2-1	25,000	Kuthan 26', Kirbes W. 30'
25	20.05.1923	A	FAC	3-0	6,000	Richter 12', Brandstetter J. 27' (pen.), Witka
26	01.07.1923	H	Vienna	5-2	12,000	Uridil J. 25' 69', Brandstetter J. 61' (pen.), Kirbes W. 67', Bauer E. 71'

=== Cup ===
Rd	Date	Venue	Opponent	Res.	Att.	Goals and discipline
R1	11.02.1923	H	Cricket	3-1	4,000	Kuthan 8', Schlosser 54' (pen.), Richter 86'
R16	04.03.1923	H	Bewegungsspieler	5-0	5,000	Brandstetter J. 1', Wesely 21', Unknown 59' (o.g.), Schlosser 74', Wondrak 90'
QF	29.04.1923	H	Admira	5-1	20,000	Wesely 12', Bauer E. 37', Wondrak 61', Richter 77', Kuthan (pen.)
SF	31.05.1923	A	Wacker Wien	2-4	13,000	Brandstetter J. 22' (pen.), Wesely 31'
