= 1912–13 SK Rapid Wien season =

Rapid Wien
1912–13 season
- Coach: Dionys Schönecker
- Stadium: Pfarrwiese, Vienna, Austria
- First class: Champions (2nd title)
- Top goalscorer: Richard Kuthan (15)

The 1912–13 SK Rapid Wien season was the 15th season in club history.

== Squad ==
=== Squad statistics ===
Nat.	Name	League	
Nat.	Name	Apps	Goals
Goalkeepers
(Austrian Empire)	Josef Kaltenbrunner	13	0
(Austrian Empire)	Josef Koceny	5	0
Defenders
(Austrian Empire)	Franz Balzer	6	0
(Austrian Empire)	Fritz Brandstetter	18	6
(Austrian Empire)	Vinzenz Dittrich	5	0
(Austrian Empire)	Rudolf Kühn	1	0
(Austrian Empire)	Josef Tauschinsky	1	0
(Austrian Empire)	Anton Wegscheider	1	0
Midfielders
(Austrian Empire)	Josef Brandstetter	16	3
(Austrian Empire)	Josef Hagler	12	2
(Austrian Empire)	Karl Jech	10	1
(Austrian Empire)	Josef Klima	18	0
(Austrian Empire)	Gustav Putzendoppler	1	0
(Austrian Empire)	Franz Schediwy	1	0
Forwards
(Austrian Empire)	Eduard Bauer	14	4
(Austrian Empire)	Gustav Blaha	16	13
(Austrian Empire)	Leopold Grundwald	17	8
(Austrian Empire)	Johann Kowarik	4	1
(Austrian Empire)	Heinz Körner	18	6
(Austrian Empire)	Richard Kuthan	18	15
(Austrian Empire)	Josef Schediwy	3	0

== Fixtures and results ==
Win Draw Loss

=== League ===
Rd	Date	Venue	Opponent	Res.	Goals and discipline
1	01.09.1912	H	Amateure	3-0	Kowarik, Blaha
2	08.09.1912	H	Vienna	1-1	Brandstetter F.
3	13.10.1912	A	Hertha Wien	4-2	Blaha 12', Brandstetter F. 20', Körner H.
4	29.09.1912	A	Wiener AC	1-1	Bauer E. 44'
5	01.11.1912	H	Simmering	7-0	Körner H., Brandstetter J. 50', Hagler 65' 77', Kuthan 73' 80', Blaha 75'
6	15.11.1912	A	Wiener SC	1-0	Blaha 46'
7	17.11.1912	A	FAC	3-1	Körner H. 75' 85', Brandstetter J. 84'
8	24.11.1912	H	Rudolfshügel	4-1	Grundwald 10', Kuthan, Brandstetter F. (pen.)
9	01.12.1912	H	Wiener AF	2-1	Grundwald 60', Blaha 80'
10	18.05.1913	A	Simmering	4-2	Blaha 24' 53' 59', Grundwald 38'
11	09.03.1913	A	Amateure	4-1	Grundwald 16', Brandstetter F. 30' (pen.), Bauer E. 60', Körner H.
12	16.03.1913	H	Wiener AC	4-3	Kuthan 17' 82', Grundwald 70', Bauer E. 75'
13	30.03.1913	H	FAC	5-0	Kuthan 38' 58', Blaha 75' 77', Körner H. 89'
14	13.04.1913	H	Wiener SC	5-0	Kuthan 19' 64', Grundwald 59', Brandstetter F. (pen.), Jech
15	20.04.1913	A	Vienna	2-1	Kuthan 48', Brandstetter F. 50' (pen.)
16	01.05.1913	H	Hertha Wien	2-1	Kuthan, Blaha
17	04.05.1913	A	Wiener AF	2-2	Brandstetter J. 57', Grundwald 90'
18	29.06.1913	A	Rudolfshügel	5-0	Grundwald, Kuthan 59', Bauer E.
