= 1911–12 SK Rapid Wien season =

Rapid Wien
1911–12 season
- Coach: Dionys Schönecker
- Stadium: Pfarrwiese, Vienna, Austria
- First class: Champions (1st title)
- Top goalscorer: Gustav Blaha (12)

The 1911–12 SK Rapid Wien season was the 14th season in club history.

== Squad ==
=== Squad statistics ===
Nat.	Name	League	
Nat.	Name	Apps	Goals
Goalkeepers
(Austrian Empire)	Josef Kaltenbrunner	17	
(Austrian Empire)	Josef Koceny	3	
Defenders
(Austrian Empire)	Fritz Brandstetter	20	
(Austrian Empire)	Rudolf Kühn	1	
(Austrian Empire)	Josef Tauschinsky	17	1
Midfielders
(Austrian Empire)	Josef Brandstetter	16	1
(Austrian Empire)	Josef Hagler	19	1
(Austrian Empire)	Karl Jech	19	
(Austrian Empire)	Josef Klima	7	
(Austrian Empire)	Franz Schediwy	1	
Forwards
(Austrian Empire)	Eduard Bauer	3	1
(Austrian Empire)	Gustav Blaha	17	12
(Austrian Empire)	Leopold Grundwald	17	11
(Austrian Empire)	Johann Kowarik	20	2
(Austrian Empire)	Heinz Körner	20	10
(Austrian Empire)	Richard Kuthan	20	9
(Austrian Empire)	Josef Schediwy	3	3

== Fixtures and results ==
Win Draw Loss

=== League ===
Rd	Date	Venue	Opponent	Res.	Goals and discipline
1	08.09.1911	A	Amateure	4-1	Unknown (pen.) (pen.), Blaha
2	10.09.1911	A	FAC	4-2	Blaha 22' 55', Kuthan, Unknown
3	17.09.1911	A	Wiener SC	3-1	Grundwald, Kuthan 15', Körner H.
4	24.09.1911	A	Wiener AC	3-4	Körner H. 15'
5	08.10.1911	A	Vienna	3-0	Unknown, Kowarik, Körner H.
6	15.10.1911	A	Cricket	3-0	Unknown
8	22.10.1911	A	Hertha Wien	3-1	Unknown, Brandstetter J.
9	12.11.1911	A	Simmering	2-5	Kuthan 55', Blaha 87'
10	15.11.1911	A	Rudolfshügel	3-1	Blaha 8', Kowarik
11	29.10.1911	A	Wiener AF	2-1	Kuthan 44' (pen.), Blaha 75'
13	28.04.1912	H	Wiener AC	2-1	Unknown 57', Blaha 66'
14	02.06.1912	H	Rudolfshügel	1-2	Grundwald
15	29.06.1912	H	Hertha Wien	3-1	Schediwy J., Körner H.
16	19.05.1912	H	Simmering	3-4	Kuthan 61', Grundwald 70' 90'
17	16.05.1912	H	Wiener SC	5-1	Kuthan, Hagler, Grundwald, Blaha
18	15.05.1912	H	FAC	9-2	Grundwald, Kuthan, Blaha, Körner H.
19	30.06.1912	H	Cricket	3-1	Unknown (pen.), Körner H. 84', Schediwy J.
20	09.06.1912	H	Amateure	3-0	Unknown 65', Blaha
21	16.06.1912	H	Wiener AF	1-1	Grundwald 80'
22	23.06.1912	H	Vienna	4-2	Tauschinsky (pen.), Kuthan (pen.), Körner H., Bauer E.
