= 1944–45 SK Rapid Wien season =

Rapid Wien
1944–45 season
- Coach: Leopold Nitsch
- Stadium: Pfarrwiese, Vienna, Austria
- Gauliga: not completed
- Tschammerpokal: eliminated in 3rd qualification round (competition not finished)
- Top goalscorer: League: Friedrich Hoffmann (10); All: Friedrich Hoffmann (10)

The 1944–45 SK Rapid Wien season was the 47th season in club history.

== Squad ==
=== Squad statistics ===
Nat.	Name	Gauliga		Cup		Total	
Nat.	Name	Apps	Goals	Apps	Goals	Apps	Goals
Goalkeepers
(Nazi Germany)	Josef Musil	6				6	
(Nazi Germany)	Rudolf Raftl	5		3		8	
Defenders
(Nazi Germany)	Fritz Durlach	11		3		14	
(Nazi Germany)	Franz Rybicki	9	1	3		12	1
Midfielders
(Nazi Germany)	Alfred Fritschi	1				1	
(Nazi Germany)	Leopold Gernhardt	7	6	3	1	10	7
(Nazi Germany)	Johann Hofstätter	10		2		12	
(Democratic Federal Yugoslavia)	Stanislaus Orel	2		1		3	
(Nazi Germany)	Arthur Schütz	2				2	
(Nazi Germany)	Günther Thielert	9				9	
(Nazi Germany)	Otto Wiedermann			3		3	
Forwards
(Nazi Germany)	Lukas Aurednik	2				2	
(Nazi Germany)	Franz Binder			1		1	
(Nazi Germany)	Hermann Dvoracek	7	7			7	7
(Nazi Germany)	Willy Fitz	2		3	1	5	1
(Nazi Germany)	Rudolf Gersten	2	1			2	1
(Nazi Germany)	Friedrich Hoffmann	6	10			6	10
(Nazi Germany)	Matthias Kaburek	6	3			6	3
(Nazi Germany)	Franz Kaspirek	11	4	3	3	14	7
(Nazi Germany)	Franz Knor	3		3		6	
(Nazi Germany)	Alfred Körner	3				3	
(Nazi Germany)	Robert Körner	1		1	3	2	3
(Nazi Germany)	Peter Queck	10	6	2	2	12	8
(Nazi Germany)	Georg Schors	4		1		5	
(Nazi Germany)	Engelbert Smutny	1	1			1	1
(Nazi Germany)	Eugen Stöckler	1				1	
(Nazi Germany)	Engelbert Uridil			1		1	

== Fixtures and results ==
Win Draw Loss

=== Gauliga ===
The competition was abandoned due to war. The games played are usually not counted in official statistics.

Rd	Date	Venue	Opponent	Res.	Att.	Goals and discipline
1	17.09.1944	H	FAC	3-1	11,000	Rybicki 40', Gernhardt
2	24.09.1944	H	Wiener SC	3-0	5,500	Kaspirek 12', Kaburek M. 46', Queck 62'
3	01.10.1944	H	Wacker Wien	2-3	14,000	Queck 13', Gernhardt 55'
4	08.10.1944	A	Vienna	5-0	14,000	Smutny 16', Kaburek M. 38', Queck, Dvoracek 76' 85'
5	15.10.1944	A	Austria Wien	3-1	15,000	Queck 7' 84', Kaspirek 12'
6	29.10.1944	H	FC Wien	1-1	8,000	Kaburek M. 65'
7	12.11.1944	H	Oberlaa	7-1	5,000	Hoffmann F., Gernhardt, Dvoracek
8	26.11.1944	H	Wiener AC	9-3	6,000	Hoffmann F. 33' 35', Gernhardt, Kaspirek (pen.)
9	08.12.1944	A	Admira	2-2	4,000	Queck 32', Hoffmann F. 86'
10	18.03.1945	H	Admira	3-1	6,000	Dvoracek (pen.), Gersten
11	25.03.1945	H	FAC	1-2	8,500	Dvoracek

=== Tschammerpokal ===
Rd	Date	Venue	Opponent	Res.	Att.	Goals and discipline
Q1	04.06.1944	H	Admira	1-0	10,000	Fitz 55'
Q2	25.06.1944	H	Helfort	8-4	9,000	Kaspirek 12' (pen.), Gernhardt 16', Queck 23' 46', Körner R. 42'
Q3	02.07.1944	H	Wiener AC	1-2	10,000	Kaspirek 76' (pen.)
