= 1951–52 SK Rapid Wien season =

Rapid Wien
1951–52 season
- Coach: Hans Pesser
- Stadium: Pfarrwiese, Vienna, Austria
- Staatsliga A: Champions (18th title)
- Top goalscorer: Erich Probst (28)
- Average home league attendance: 17,800

The 1951–52 SK Rapid Wien season was the 54th season in club history.

== Squad ==
=== Squad statistics ===
Nat.	Name	Age	League	
Nat.	Name	Age	Apps	Goals
Goalkeepers
(Austria)	Josef Musil	30	16	
(Austria)	Walter Zeman	24	10	
Defenders
(Austria)	Ernst Happel	25	21	1
(Austria)	Max Merkel	32	24	2
Midfielders
(Austria)	Leopold Gernhardt	31	22	9
(Austria)	Karl Giesser	22	7	
(Austria)	Franz Golobic	29	26	4
(Austria)	Gerhard Hanappi	22	25	15
(Austria)	Robert Kaffka	21	11	
(Austria)	Erich Müller	23	18	
Forwards
(Austria)	Robert Dienst	23	23	18
(Austria)	Alfred Körner	25	18	8
(Austria)	Robert Körner	26	21	11
(Austria)	Erich Probst	23	18	28
(Austria)	Johann Riegler	21	23	7
(Austria)	Alfred Teinitzer	21	3	2

== Fixtures and results ==
Win Draw Loss

=== League ===
Rd	Date	Venue	Opponent	Res.	Att.	Goals and discipline
1	26.08.1951	A	Austria Wien	3-5	53,000	Körner R. 40', Probst E. 50', Teinitzer 86'
2	02.09.1951	H	Admira	2-1	23,000	Teinitzer 8', Dienst 25'
3	09.09.1951	A	Sturm Graz	4-0	8,000	Lobenhofer 7' (o.g.), Probst E. 24' 28' 80'
4	16.09.1951	H	Wiener SC	10-3	35,000	Körner R. 1', Riegler 9', Dienst 18' 33' 43' 65', Probst E. 43' 47' 74', Hausteiner 46' (o.g.)
5	29.09.1951	A	FC Wien	5-2	6,000	Probst E. 3', Dienst 40', Körner A. 43' 75', Golobic 90'
6	07.10.1951	A	GAK	0-3	9,000	
7	21.10.1951	H	Simmering	5-1	23,000	Merkel 27', Probst E. 50' 53', Dienst 70', Körner R. 86' (pen.)
8	28.10.1951	A	FavSK Blau Weiß	6-0	10,000	Probst E. 36' 58' 75', Riegler 46', Körner R. 67', Körner A. 82'
9	07.11.1951	H	FAC	10-1	3,500	Riegler, Probst E., Körner R. (pen.), Körner A.
10	11.11.1951	H	Wacker Wien	2-3	36,000	Riegler 30', Gernhardt 78'
11	18.11.1951	A	LASK	3-2	15,000	Dienst 43' 53' 63'
12	02.12.1951	H	Vienna	2-2	10,000	Hanappi 18', Körner A. 27'
13	09.12.1951	H	Kapfenberg	4-0	10,000	Hanappi 10' 23' 77' 89'
14	08.03.1952	H	Austria Wien	3-1	48,000	Körner R. 6' 73', Gernhardt 57'
15	04.03.1952	A	Admira	3-1	11,000	Körner A. 17', Dienst 19', Hanappi 51'
16	16.06.1952	H	Sturm Graz	7-1	15,000	Probst E. 11', Golobic 24' 27', Gernhardt 29', Dienst 35', Hanappi 65' 89'
17	16.03.1952	A	Wiener SC	4-0	35,000	Happel 4', Gernhardt 21' 60', Körner A. 74'
18	30.03.1952	H	FC Wien	3-1	4,000	Probst E. 17', Hanappi 31', Dienst 73'
19	05.04.1952	H	GAK	6-0	13,000	Probst E. 3' 17' 44' 51', Riegler 15', Körner R. 34' (pen.)
20	20.04.1952	A	Simmering	4-1	30,000	Merkel 39', Riegler 60', Hanappi 83', Gernhardt 86'
21	26.04.1952	H	FavSK Blau Weiß	5-0	5,000	Golobic 22', Hanappi 42', Dienst 60' 62' 63'
22	17.05.1952	A	FAC	2-3	5,500	Probst E. 25', Hanappi 72'
23	04.05.1952	A	Wacker Wien	3-1	25,000	Hanappi 50' 52', Gernhardt 75'
24	11.05.1952	H	LASK	5-2	6,000	Probst E. 5' 40' 77', Gernhardt 30', Körner R. 88'
25	08.06.1952	A	Vienna	2-5	30,000	Dienst 63', Probst E. 71'
26	15.06.1952	A	Kapfenberg	4-0	7,000	Hanappi, Dienst, Probst E., Gernhardt
