= 1949–50 SK Rapid Wien season =

Rapid Wien
1949–50 season
- Coach: Hans Pesser
- Stadium: Pfarrwiese, Vienna, Austria
- Staatsliga A: 2nd
- Top goalscorer: Alfred Körner (22)
- Average home league attendance: 25,600

The 1949–50 SK Rapid Wien season was the 52nd season in club history.

== Squad ==
=== Squad statistics ===
Nat.	Name	Age	League		Discipline
Nat.	Name	Age	Apps	Goals	Red card
Goalkeepers
(Austria)	Josef Musil	28	3		
(Austria)	Walter Zeman	22	21		
Defenders
(Austria)	Ernst Happel	23	21		
(Austria)	Max Merkel	30	24	1	
(Austria)	Stefan Wagner	35	7		
Midfielders
(Austria)	Leopold Gernhardt	29	21	9	
(Austria)	Franz Golobic	27	19		
(Austria)	Roman Knor	22	7	1	
(Austria)	Erich Müller	21	21		
Forwards
(Austria)	Robert Dienst	21	20	19	1
(Austria)	Karl Giesser	20	13	9	
(Austria)	Franz Kaspirek	31	2		
(Austria)	Alfred Körner	23	23	22	
(Austria)	Robert Körner	24	23	7	
(Austria)	Johann Riegler	19	22	10	
(Austria)	Kurt Schindlauer	20	1	1	
(Austria)	Ferdinand Smetana	25	2		
(Austria)	Leopold Ströll	27	11	8	
(Austria)	Alfred Teinitzer	19	3		

== Fixtures and results ==
Win Draw Loss

=== League ===
Rd	Date	Venue	Opponent	Res.	Att.	Goals and discipline
1	28.08.1949	H	Slovan Wien	5-2	40,000	Riegler 6', Gernhardt 50', Dienst 60' 67', Ströll 73'
2	04.09.1949	A	Steyr	2-3	10,000	Körner A. 28', Riegler 40'
3	10.09.1949	H	FC Wien	2-5	25,000	Riegler 8', Ströll 19'
4	18.09.1949	A	Gloggnitz	8-2	8,000	Ströll 13' 47', Körner A. 37' 51' 73' 84', Riegler 39', Dienst 83'
6	08.10.1949	H	FAC	2-1	8,000	Giesser 15' 60'
7	23.10.1949	A	Austria Wien	4-4	40,000	Dienst 4' 24', Riegler 66', Körner A. 69'; Dienst (red card)
8	30.10.1949	H	Oberlaa	8-2	12,000	Ströll 17' 53', Körner A. 32' 43' 82' 86', Gernhardt 37', Schindlauer 41'
9	18.12.1949	A	Sturm Graz	3-3	9,000	Riegler 5', Dienst 20', Körner R. 65' (pen.)
10	20.11.1949	H	Vienna	6-0	30,000	Giesser 7' 35', Körner A. 19' 53', Dienst 65' 72'
11	27.11.1949	A	Wacker Wien	5-2	28,000	Dienst 18' 26', Gernhardt 81', Körner A. 81', Körner R. 86'
12	04.12.1949	H	Admira	4-2	32,000	Gernhardt 5', Dienst 50', Giesser 76', Körner A. 87'
13	11.12.1949	A	Wiener SC	3-0	20,000	Körner R. 13' (pen.), Körner A. 43', Dienst 46'
14	26.02.1950	A	Slovan Wien	1-1	6,500	Riegler 45'
15	05.03.1950	H	Steyr	4-2	17,000	Giesser 3' 81', Körner R. 66' (pen.), Körner A. 77'
16	12.03.1950	A	FC Wien	1-1	23,000	Körner R. 47'
17	26.03.1950	H	Gloggnitz	2-1	22,000	Giesser 16', Dienst 17'
19	26.04.1950	A	FAC	3-0	14,000	Riegler 65', Dienst 72', Gernhardt 78'
20	30.04.1950	H	Austria Wien	4-2	54,000	Körner A. 25', Gernhardt 60', Merkel 65', Dienst 83'
21	07.05.1950	A	Oberlaa	6-0	12,000	Ströll 4', Dienst 21', Körner R. 23', Riegler 59', Gernhardt 68' 75'
22	21.05.1950	H	Sturm Graz	6-0	7,000	Körner A. 5' 44' 61' 70', Dienst 20' 24'
23	04.06.1950	A	Vienna	2-0	10,000	Dienst 35', Knor R. 59'
24	10.06.1950	H	Wacker Wien	3-1	35,000	Körner A. 33', Körner R. 80', Riegler 84'
25	17.06.1950	A	Admira	2-5	30,000	Ströll 6', Gernhardt 88'
26	24.06.1950	H	Wiener SC	1-4	25,000	Giesser 10'
