= 1943–44 SK Rapid Wien season =

Rapid Wien
1943–44 season
- Coach: Leopold Nitsch
- Stadium: Pfarrwiese, Vienna, Austria
- Gauliga: 7th
- Tschammerpokal: 1st qualification round
- Top goalscorer: League: Hermann Dvoracek (12); All: Hermann Dvoracek (12)
- Average home league attendance: 10,400

The 1943–44 SK Rapid Wien season was the 46th season in club history.

== Squad ==
=== Squad statistics ===
Nat.	Name	Gauliga		Cup		Total	
Nat.	Name	Apps	Goals	Apps	Goals	Apps	Goals
Goalkeepers
(Nazi Germany)	Hans Kovar	6		1		7	
(Nazi Germany)	Rudolf Raftl	10				10	
Defenders
(Nazi Germany)	Adolf Dumser	3				3	
(Nazi Germany)	Fritz Durlach	1				1	
(Nazi Germany)	Ernst Happel	11				11	
(Nazi Germany)	Franz Rybicki	16				16	
(Nazi Germany)	Erwin Tiefengraber			1		1	
Midfielders
(Nazi Germany)	Leopold Gernhardt	7				7	
(Nazi Germany)	Franz Hofer			1		1	
(Nazi Germany)	Johann Hofstätter	12	1			12	1
(Nazi Germany)	Josef Kirner	3				3	
(Democratic Federal Yugoslavia)	Stanislaus Orel	4	1	1		5	1
(Nazi Germany)	Franz Prak	7		1		8	
(Nazi Germany)	Engelbert Uridil	15		1		16	
(Nazi Germany)	Otto Wiedermann	2				2	
Forwards
(Netherlands)	Franciscus Beelen	3	1			3	1
(Nazi Germany)	Franz Binder	2	4			2	4
(Nazi Germany)	Karl Domnanich			1	1	1	1
(Nazi Germany)	Hermann Dvoracek	13	12	1		14	12
(Nazi Germany)	Willy Fitz	11	4	1		12	4
(Nazi Germany)	Franz Fuchsberger	1				1	
(Nazi Germany)	Franz Kaspirek	15	3	1	2	16	5
(Nazi Germany)	Franz Knor	6	1			6	1
(Nazi Germany)	Alfred Körner	10	1	1		11	1
(Nazi Germany)	Robert Körner	2				2	
(Nazi Germany)	Peter Queck	13	7			13	7
(Nazi Germany)	Fritz Roth	3	2			3	2

== Fixtures and results ==
Win Draw Loss

=== Gauliga ===
Rd	Date	Venue	Opponent	Res.	Att.	Goals and discipline
1	22.08.1943	H	FC Wien	3-0	10,000	Dvoracek 36' 50' 84' (pen.)
2	05.09.1943	H	FAC	2-2	18,000	Queck 20', Körner A. 40'
3	12.09.1943	H	Austria Wien	1-2	25,000	Dvoracek 10'
5	10.10.1943	H	Wiener AC	1-2	7,000	Queck 29'
6	17.10.1943	A	LSV Markersdorf	1-2	4,500	Roth 23'
7	24.10.1943	A	Vienna	2-10	20,000	Roth 64', Dvoracek 66'
8	31.10.1943	A	Wacker Wien	2-1	10,000	Queck 46', Fitz 70'
9	07.11.1943	A	Wiener SC	1-2	8,000	Hofstätter 46'
10	14.11.1943	A	FC Wien	1-0	12,000	Kaspirek 80'
11	12.12.1943	A	FAC	2-3	8,000	Dvoracek 30' (pen.) 54'
12	26.03.1944	A	Austria Wien	0-2	7,000	
14	19.03.1944	A	Wiener AC	4-2	7,000	Queck 52', Kaspirek 60', Dvoracek 67' (pen.) 89'
15	23.04.1944	H	LSV Markersdorf	3-3	5,000	Beelen 38', Orel 57', Queck 60'
16	13.05.1944	H	Vienna	1-3	6,000	Knor F. 10'
17	02.04.1944	H	Wacker Wien	4-4	7,500	Fitz 39' 72', Queck 46', Dvoracek 66'
18	09.04.1944	H	Wiener SC	9-4	5,000	Dvoracek 4' 11', Binder 6' 7' 34' (pen.) 42' (pen.), Kaspirek 23', Queck 57', Fitz 72'

=== Tschammerpokal ===
Rd	Date	Venue	Opponent	Res.	Att.	Goals and discipline
Q1	23.05.1943	A	Kapfenberg	3-6	6,000	Kaspirek 56', Domnanich K.
