= 1946–47 SK Rapid Wien season =

Rapid Wien
1946–47 season
- Coach: Hans Pesser
- Stadium: Pfarrwiese, Vienna, Austria
- Liga: 2nd
- Cup: Quarterfinals
- Top goalscorer: League: Alfred Körner (15); All: Franz Binder (16)
- Average home league attendance: 20,300

The 1946–47 SK Rapid Wien season was the 49th season in club history.

== Squad ==
=== Squad statistics ===
Nat.	Name	Age	League		Cup		Total	
Nat.	Name	Age	Apps	Goals	Apps	Goals	Apps	Goals
Goalkeepers
(Austria)	Josef Musil	25	12		2		14	
(Austria)	Walter Zeman	19	8		1		9	
Defenders
(Austria)	Ernst Happel	20	16		2		18	
(Austria)	Engelbert Smutny	29	17	2	3		20	2
(Austria)	Stefan Wagner	32	8		3		11	
Midfielders
(Austria)	Leopold Gernhardt	26	18	1	1	2	19	3
(Austria)	Franz Golobic	24	9		1		10	
(Austria)	Max Merkel	27	11	1	2	1	13	2
(Austria)	Franz Wagner	34	17		3		20	
Forwards
(Austria)	Franz Binder	34	15	12	2	4	17	16
(Austria)	Karl Domnanich	21	4	3	2	2	6	5
(Austria)	Willy Fitz	28	15	6	2		17	6
(Austria)	Josef Hartl	29	4	6			4	6
(Austria)	Franz Kaspirek	28	20	2	2		22	2
(Austria)	Adalbert Kaubek	20	1		1	1	2	1
(Austria)	Alfred Körner	20	17	15	3		20	15
(Austria)	Robert Körner	21	20	9	3	1	23	10
(Austria)	Erich Müller	18	1	1			1	1
(Austria)	Georg Schors	32	7	2			7	2

== Fixtures and results ==
Win Draw Loss

=== League ===
Rd	Date	Venue	Opponent	Res.	Att.	Goals and discipline
1	25.08.1946	A	Post	8-3	27,000	Körner R. 18', Hartl J. 20' 38', Körner A. 50' 52' 58' 80', Fitz 72'
2	01.09.1946	H	Hochstädt	4-1	14,000	Kaspirek 5', Hartl J. 45' 52' 89'
3	08.09.1946	A	Vienna	2-2	40,000	Hartl J. 25', Binder 88'
5	22.09.1946	H	Wacker Wien	3-2	56,000	Binder 27', Fitz 65', Körner A. 84'
6	29.09.1946	A	Austria Wien	3-0	31,000	Fitz 33', Körner A. 52', Körner R. 88'
7	13.10.1946	H	Wiener AC	2-0	10,000	Körner R. 33' 51'
8	20.10.1946	A	FAC	4-5	20,000	Körner A. 16', Binder 30' 66', Kaspirek 59'
9	03.11.1946	H	Admira	4-0	16,000	Körner A. 7' 28', Binder 11' (pen.), Körner R. 16'
10	24.11.1946	A	Wiener SC	2-1	13,000	Binder 12', Gernhardt 16'
11	08.12.1946	H	FC Wien	4-3	14,000	Fitz 12' 30', Körner A. 75', Binder 87'
12	23.03.1947	H	Post	0-1	15,000	
13	05.07.1947	A	Hochstädt	4-0	5,000	Körner R. 41' (pen.), Körner A. 48' 88', Schors 82'
14	09.03.1947	H	Vienna	0-4	16,000	
16	20.04.1947	A	Wacker Wien	5-4	56,000	Domnanich K. 17' 30', Körner R., Merkel, Körner A. 50'
17	30.03.1947	H	Austria Wien	2-3	35,000	Müller E. 83', Körner R. 90' (pen.)
18	13.04.1947	A	Wiener AC	2-1	48,000	Binder 14', Fitz 65'
19	27.04.1947	H	FAC	2-2	10,000	Körner R. 20' (pen.), Körner A.
20	18.05.1947	A	Admira	2-0	10,000	Binder 30', Körner A. 60'
21	01.06.1947	H	Wiener SC	5-1	17,000	Binder 15' 53' 58', Smutny 24' 32'
22	08.06.1947	A	FC Wien	2-3	20,000	Domnanich K. 2', Schors 31'

=== Cup ===
Rd	Date	Venue	Opponent	Res.	Att.	Goals and discipline
R1	17.11.1946	H	Breitensee	6-0	4,000	Kaubek, Gernhardt, Binder
R16	16.04.1947	H	Vienna	3-2	14,000	Domnanich K. 31', Körner R., Binder
QF	08.05.1947	H	Austria Wien	2-3	16,000	Merkel 30', Domnanich K. 65'
