= Franz Golobic =

Austrian footballer (1922–2010)

Personal information
- Date of birth: 7 April 1922
- Date of death: 20 July 2010 (aged 88)
- Position: Defender

Senior career*
Years	Team	Apps	(Gls)
1940–1946	FC Wien	47	(5)
1946–1959	SK Rapid Wien	249	(9)

International career
1953	Austria	3	(0)
- * Club domestic league appearances and goals

Franz Golobic (7 April 1922 – 20 July 2010) was an Austrian international footballer.
