= Leopold Gernhardt =

Austrian footballer and coach

Personal information
- Date of birth: 16 March 1920
- Date of death: 18 April 2013 (aged 93)
- Position: Midfielder

Youth career
- ASK Graphia

Senior career*
Years	Team	Apps	(Gls)
1939–1955	SK Rapid Wien	208	(53)

International career
1945–1952	Austria	27	(0)

Managerial career
- 1955: SK Rapid Wien
- 1958: Wacker Wien
- 1960–1962: First Vienna FC
- 1962–1963: FC Lustenau 07
- 1963–1964: Austria Klagenfurt
- * Club domestic league appearances and goals

Leopold Gernhardt (16 March 1920 – 18 April 2013) was an Austrian footballer and coach. He was also part of Austria's squad for the football tournament at the 1948 Summer Olympics, but he did not play in any matches.
