= Josef Klíma =

Czech basketball player

Personal information
- Nationality: Czech
- Born: 3 June 1911; Karlovy Vary, Austria-Hungary
- Died: 6 February 2007 (aged 95)

Sport
- Sport: Basketball

Josef Klíma (3 June 1911 – 6 February 2007) was a Czech basketball player. He competed in the men's tournament at the 1936 Summer Olympics.
