= Willibald Stejskal =

Austrian footballer

Personal information
- Full name: Willibald Josef Stejskal
- Date of birth: 25 April 1896
- Place of birth: Vienna, Austria-Hungary
- Date of death: 20 March 1977 (aged 80)
- Place of death: Gand, Belgium
- Position: Defender

Senior career*
Years	Team	Apps	(Gls)
1914–1923	Rapid Vienna	60	(1)
1923	Wacker Wien	1	(0)
1924	Wiener AF	2	(0)

International career
1918	Austria	1	(0)

Managerial career
- 1921–1922: Modena
- 1924: Slavia Sofia
- 1925: Bulgaria
- 1929: Polonia Warsaw
- 1932–1933: Metz
- 1936–: Vigor Hamme
- 1942–1943: Gent
- 1942–1944: Cercle Brugge
- 1948–1949: Waregem
- 1953: Ajax (interim)
- * Club domestic league appearances and goals

Willibald "Willy" Josef Stejskal (25 April 1896 in Vienna – 20 mars 1977) was an Austrian football (soccer) player in defender role and manager.

== Playing career ==
=== Club ===
He played for Rapid Vienna from 1914 to 1923. In this period he won with the club four national championships and once the Austrian Cup. In 1923, he also played for Wacker Wien and in 1924, he finished his Austrian career as player with Wiener AF.

After this, he moved to Australia, where he claimed that he had been for two years. It is known, that in 1928 he played for the team of the stove manufacturer Metters Limited, probably based in the Sydney suburb of Canterbury and a major force in the football of the city in that era. There he falsely claimed, having been a member of the Czechoslovak team at the 1924 Olympics.

Honours

- Championship: 1915/16, 1916/17, 1918/19, 1922/23
- Cup: 1918/19

=== International ===
He made his debut for Austria in June 1918 friendly match at home against Hungary, his sole international game.

== Managerial career ==
He coached Modena, Slavia Sofia, Polonia Warsaw, FC Metz, Vigor Hamme, Gent, Cercle Brugge and from March 1953 Ajax.

== Personal life ==
Willy was born in Vienna, the son of Marie Cerny and Adelbert Stejskal.

He was married to Adriene D'Hont.
