= Gustav Wieser =

Austrian footballer and coach

Personal information
- Date of birth: 24 June 1898
- Date of death: 1960 (aged 61–62)
- Position: Striker

Senior career*
| Years | Team | Apps | (Gls) |
| 1914–1921 | Rapid Wien | 82 | (62) |
| 1921–1923 | Würzburger Kickers | | |
| 1923–1927 | Amateure | | |

International career
| 1916–1926 | Austria | 27 | (12) |

Managerial career
- 1927–1928: Eintracht Frankfurt
- 1928–1929: FC Schalke 04
- TuS Bremerhaven
- Jeunesse Esch
- 1933–1934: Legia Warsaw
- 1934–1935: Ruch Hajduki Wielkie
- * Club domestic league appearances and goals

Gustav "Guggi" Wieser (24 June 1898 – 1960) was an Austrian football player and manager.

== Honours ==
=== Manager ===
Ruch Hajduki Wielkie

- Ekstraklasa: 1934, 1935
