= Rudolf Rupec =

Croatian footballer

Personal information
- Date of birth: 17 September 1895 or 17 November 1896
- Place of birth: Grubišno Polje, Kingdom of Croatia-Slavonia, Austria-Hungary
- Date of death: 1 July 1983 (aged 87)
- Place of death: Zagreb, SR Croatia, SFR Yugoslavia
- Position: Defender

Senior career*
Years	Team	Apps	(Gls)
1913–1920	Rapid Wien	68	(1)
1920–1923	Građanski Zagreb	62	(6)

International career
1917–1918	Austria	10	(0)
1920–1924	Kingdom of SCS	9	(0)

Managerial career
- 1938: HAŠK Zagreb
- * Club domestic league appearances and goals

Rudolf Rupec (17 September 1895 or 17 November 1896 – 1 July 1983) was a Croatian footballer who played for the national teams of Austria and the Kingdom of Serbs, Croats and Slovenes. He also competed at the 1920 Summer Olympics and the 1924 Summer Olympics.

== Club career ==
He began his career at SK Rapid Wien in 1911 and from 1913 to 1920 was on the club's first squad. In 1920 he joined a top Croatian side HŠK Građanski Zagreb. He played with the club until the end of his career in 1928. With the club he won the national championship of the Kingdom of Serbs, Croats and Slovenes in 1923 and 1926.

== International career ==
During the waning years of the Austro-Hungarian Empire, Rupec played ten matches for the Austria national football team. Rupec was part of the Kingdom's first national team, and had 9 caps, scoring no goals. His final international was at a May 1924 Olympic Games match against Uruguay.

He later coached HAŠK Zagreb to the national championship in 1938. He died in the summer of 1983 at the age of 87 in Zagreb.
