= Vinzenz Dittrich =

Austrian football player and manager

Personal information
- Date of birth: 23 February 1893
- Place of birth: Vienna, Austria-Hungary
- Date of death: 25 January 1965 (aged 71)
- Place of death: Vienna, Austria
- Position: Defender

Senior career*
Years	Team	Apps	(Gls)
1912–1925	SK Rapid Wien	151	(19)
1925–1926	Hertha Wien		

International career
1913–1923	Austria	16	(1)

Managerial career
- 1930–1931: Lithuania
- 1931–1933: Hakoah Vienna
- 1933–1935: Marseille
- 1935–1936: DSV Saaz
- 1936–1937: FC Nordstern Basel
- 1937–1938: FC Mulhouse
- 1938–1940: Hamborn 07
- 1941: Slovan Bratislava
- 1945–1947: SV Schwechat
- 1947–1949: Wiener Neustädter
- 1951: Syria
- 1953–1955: Lebanon
- * Club domestic league appearances and goals

Vinzenz Dittrich (23 February 1893 – 25 January 1965) was an Austrian professional football player, who played as a defender, and manager. He played for SK Rapid Wien, and coached Hakoah Vienna, Olympique de Marseille, DSV Saaz and FC Nordstern Basel.
