= Karl Wondrak =

Austrian footballer

Personal information
- Date of birth: 6 September 1895
- Date of death: 27 April 1973 (aged 77)
- Position: Striker

Senior career*
Years	Team	Apps	(Gls)
–1914	WAF		
1913–1928	SK Rapid Wien	221	(68)

International career
1914–1924	Austria	15	(3)
- * Club domestic league appearances and goals

Karl Wondrak (6 September 1895 – 27 April 1973) was an Austrian footballer.
