= Dionys Schönecker =

Austrian footballer and manager (1888–1938)

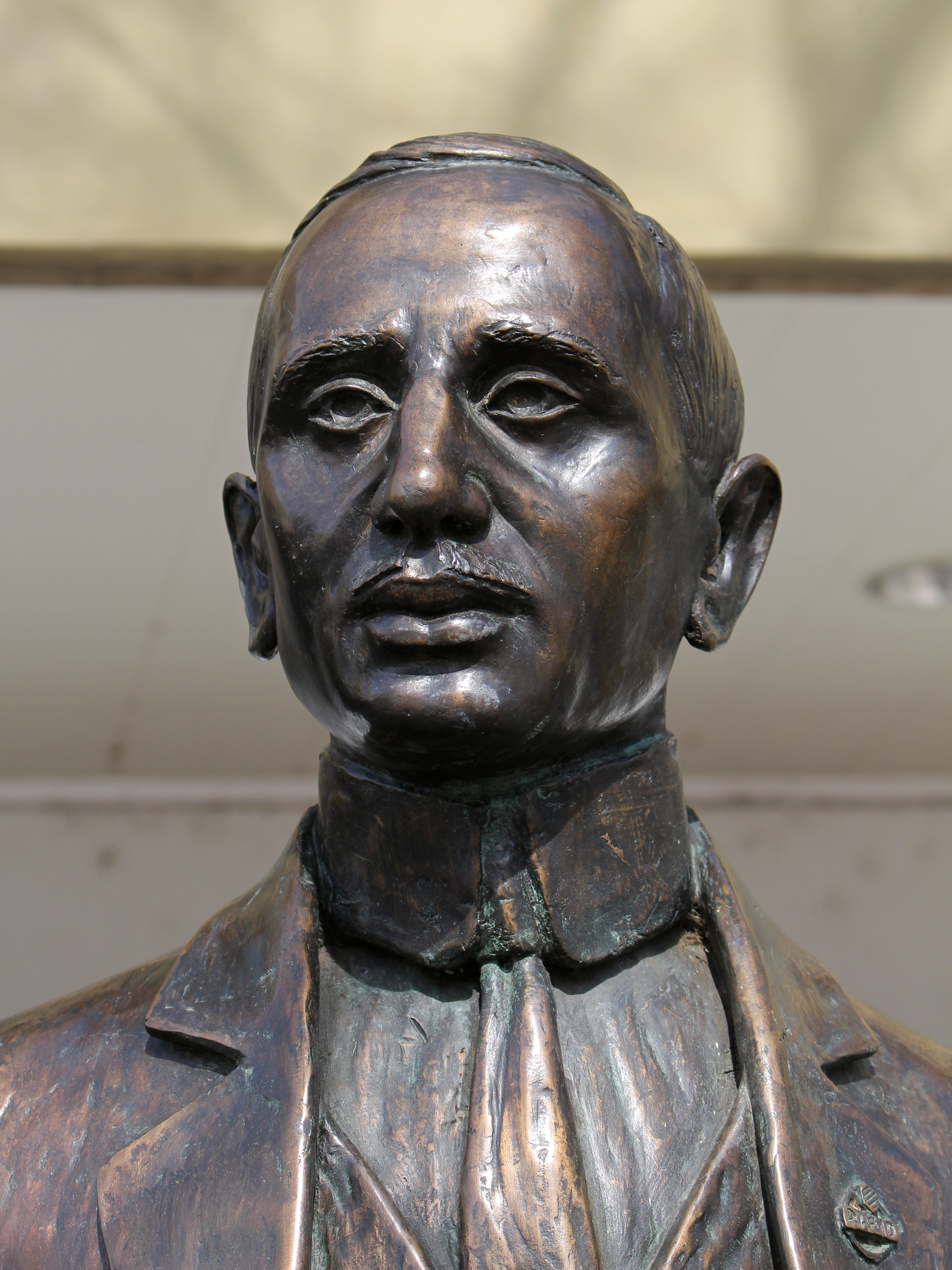
- Bronze statue in the Rapid Museum

Personal information
- Date of birth: 29 April 1888
- Place of birth: Vienna, Austria-Hungary
- Date of death: 14 September 1938 (aged 50)
- Place of death: Vienna, Austria

Senior career*
| Years | Team | Apps | (Gls) |
| 1906–1910 | Rapid Wien | | |
- Wiener Sportklub

Managerial career
- 1910–1925: Rapid Wien
- 1914: Austria
- * Club domestic league appearances and goals

Dionys Schönecker (29 April 1888 – 14 September 1938) was an Austrian footballer and coach, who oversaw Rapid Wien for 15 years, from 1910 until 1925. He also managed the Austrian national team in a single match in 1914.

== Early life ==
Dionys Schönecker was born in Vienna on 29 April 1888 as the son of a factory worker. He completed an apprenticeship as a typesetter and worked in the Steyrermühl paper factory. Schönecker began playing football together with his older brother Eduard, who appeared for the Austrian national team.

== Playing career ==
In 1906, Schönecker joined the football section of Sportklub Rapid, at the age of 18, where he initially played in the reserve team and since 1907 in the first team as a right winger. Unlike his brother, Dionys did not establish himself as an important footballer. After playing a few matches in Rapid's first team, and after a short loan to Wiener Sportklub, he retired in 1910, at the age of 22, and went on to become the youngest manager in the history of the club.

== Managerial career ==
=== Saving Rapid ===
The appointment of a 22-year-old as the main person responsible for sport and business was actually an emergency solution. Rapid was going through a crisis at that time, being on the verge of collapse after having been abandoned by almost all of its players. The management of the heavily indebted club had resigned as a whole, and the majority of the players had also turned their backs on the club. To make the situation even worse, the city of Vienna had canceled the lease for the Rudolfsheim sports field, the area of which was needed to expand the Meiselmarkt, which left Rapid without a home.

Despite taking charge of the club during this difficult phase, the 22-year-old typesetter Schönecker took courage, made a virtue of necessity and saved Rapid by using the players from the youth department to build a new team around Josef Brandstetter and "Rigo" Kuthan, whose sister Emilie he would later marry. To the surprise of many, given that until then the team had certainly not shone in terms of results, this young Rapid side won the title in the championship that was held for the first time in 1911–12. In addition to his intuition to focus on the development of young players, Schönecker also adopted a new game scheme, the so-called Kombinationsspiel, made up of short and fast passes, which replaced the old "Kick and rush" (literally: "football and running"), and thus was born the "Viennese school", which in the following years produced some of the most successful teams on the European continent.

Schönecker was also visionary economically, leasing land from the Hütteldorf parish on which his brother Eduard, who had now become a sought-after stadium architect, built the legendary Pfarrwiese, which opened in April 1912 and served as Rapid's home until 1978, and which naturally also contributed to the club's great success. This move to the outskirts of the city also meant that their mostly wealthy owners began to take an interest in their new neighbors, and Schönecker took advantage of this fact, winning over numerous artists, doctors, and entrepreneurs as wealthy members and sponsors for the club. In this way, Rapid not only managed to become financially healthy within a few years, but also gradually expanded the parish meadow so that it could eventually accommodate 25,000 spectators. Nevertheless, Schönecker always emphasized the SCR's proletarian roots, and in fact, he liked to begin his legendary speeches with the following words: "Gentlemen, we are workers, and as workers we must work!".

=== National supremacy and Mitropa Cup title ===
In the following years, Schönecker consolidated Rapid's status as Austria's most successful team, winning the title in 1912–13 without a single defeat, which was followed by the fifth championship title and the first cup victory in 1918–19. The club then won the double again the next season. However, the First World War had ended and Austria, having become a republic, was going through a period of crisis, so the 1920s were characterized by the scarcity of financial resources which weighed on the results of the club, who suffered a title drought until winning the championship again in 1922–23. The team then finished in fourth place in both 1923–24 and 1924–25, and even worse in 1925–26, when it was fifth, up to that point the worst result in the club's history.

Meanwhile, in 1924, the transition to professionalism was made official with the birth of the Vienna Football Association, which created the new I. Liga championship. Until 1926, the leader of the football section also acted as the team's coach, but after a few less successful years, it was Schönecker himself who made a change, resigning as coach and designating one of his former players, Edi Bauer, as his successor, while he remained at the helm of the section. With Bauer, Rapid became champions in 1929 and 1930 (for the 10th time) and reached three international finals in the Mitropa Cup (1927, 1928, and 1930), winning it for the first time at the third time of asking in 1930, thus becoming the first Austrian team to do so. Bauer is still the most successful coach in the club's history.

Schönecker remained the dominant man in the club as the leader of the football section until September 1938, when after suffering from appendicitis, the 50-year-old was operated on, but still died a few days later on 14 September. In his last season (1937–38), Rapid won the national title, Schönecker's 12th between the bench and management. During Schönecker's 28-year tenure as head of the club, between 1910 and 1938, Rapid became champions 12 times, won the Cup three times, and claimed the Mitropa Cup once.

=== Austrian national team ===
On 8 November 1914, Schönecker, together with his colleague Wilhelm Schmieger, oversaw the Austrian national team in a friendly match organized with the aim of raising funds for the Red Cross, which ended in a 1–2 loss to Hungary in Vienna.

== Management style ==
His management style was often described as authoritarian, almost dictatorial, and when there were disciplinary problems with a player, the offending player was often quickly thrown out, with a famous example of this being Josef Bican in 1935, since he was not used to compromising even with the strongest players of the time. As a means to achieve his declared goal of making Rapid the best team in Europe, he subordinated everything, including his players' private lives. However, Schönecker himself sometimes also had disciplinary problems, especially at derbies; for instance, in the scandalous game in 1937 in which, due to injuries and exclusions, there were only 6 Rapid players on the field when the score was 0–5, the referee wisely blew his whistle and Schönecker immediately ran up to him and gave his unprintable opinion, which earned him a hefty fine.

== Legacy ==
At his death in 1938, Schönecker was already considered a living symbol of Rapid, and in fact, as early as 1935, he was awarded the Republic's Silver Medal of Honor for his services. Despite all the titles won under his leadership, his most lasting legacy remains that he anchored the Rapid virtues of community spirit, fighting spirit, and the will to win in the club mentality. In doing so, he coined the "Rapid Spirit", of which he is now rightly regarded as the father of ("Mister Rapid").

In 1985, the Schöneckergasse street in Vienna-Penzing (14th district) was named after him. The statue of Dionys Schönecker still stands outside the old Pfarrwiese ground, surviving the transition from Gerhard-Hanappi-Stadion to Allianz.

== See also ==
- List of longest managerial reigns in association football
