= Heinz Körner =

Austrian footballer and coach (1893–1961)

Personal information
- Full name: Heinrich Körner
- Date of birth: 2 July 1893
- Place of birth: Vienna, Austria-Hungary
- Date of death: 8 December 1961 (aged 68)
- Position: Forward

Youth career
- 1907–1911: Rapid Wien

Senior career*
| Years | Team | Apps | (Gls) |
| 1911–1919 | Rapid Wien | 83 | (36+) |
| 1919 | Amateure | | |
| 1919–1921 | Rapid Wien | 13 | (3) |
| 1921–1922 | Stuttgarter Kickers | | |
| 1923–1924 | Wiener AF | | |

International career
| 1913–1918 | Austria | 7 | (0) |

Managerial career
- 1921: Union Gelsenkirchen
- 1921–1923: Stuttgarter Kickers
- RW Oberhausen
- 1923–1924: Fola Esch
- 1923–1924: Wiener AF
- 1924–1927: Fortuna Düsseldorf
- 1928–1929: Teutonia München
- 1930–1931: Concordia Basel
- 1931–1934: Fortuna Düsseldorf
- Wuppertal
- 1935–1937: FC Basel
- 1937–1938: Bayern München
- 1939–1941: Fortuna Düsseldorf
- Union 02 Hamborn
- Kölner BC
- Rot-Weiss Essen
- TuRU Düsseldorf
- 1951–1953: Fortuna Düsseldorf
- SV Wimpassing
- * Club domestic league appearances and goals

Heinrich "Heinz" Körner (né Krczal; 2 July 1893 – 8 December 1961) was an Austrian football player and coach.
