= Leopold Grundwald =

Austrian footballer and coach

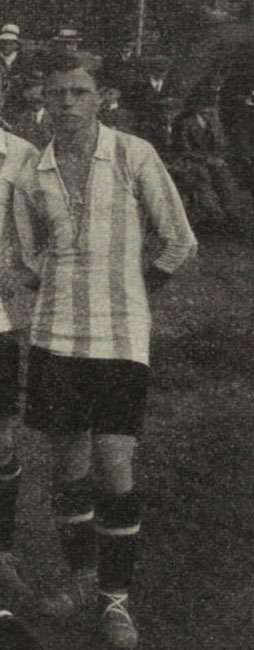

Personal information
- Date of birth: 28 October 1891
- Date of death: 9 April 1969 (aged 77)
- Position: Striker

Youth career
- 1907–1910: SK Rapid Wien

Senior career*
Years	Team	Apps	(Gls)
1910–1922	SK Rapid Wien	112	(49)

International career
1912–1916	Austria	8	(3)

Managerial career
- 1922: FC St. Gallen
- FC Schaffhausen
- * Club domestic league appearances and goals

Leopold "Grundl" Grundwald (28 October 1891 – 9 April 1969) was an Austrian footballer and coach. He competed at the 1912 Summer Olympics.
