= Leopold Nitsch =

Austrian footballer and coach

Personal information
- Date of birth: 14 August 1897
- Date of death: January 1977 (aged 79)
- Position: Forward

Youth career
- 1911–1915: Rapid Wien

Senior career*
Years	Team	Apps	(Gls)
1915–1928	Rapid Wien	198	

International career
1915–1925	Austria	35	(0)

Managerial career
- 1924: Bulgaria
- 1936–1945: Rapid Wien
- * Club domestic league appearances and goals

Leopold Nitsch (14 August 1897 – January 1977) was an Austrian football player and coach.
