= Josef Brandstetter =

Austrian footballer (1891–1945)

Sepp Brandstetter
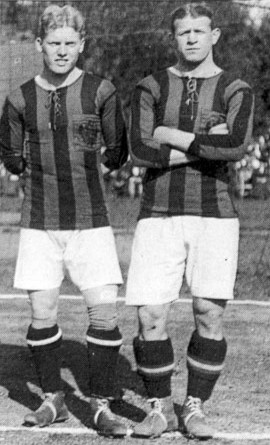
- Karl Braunsteiner and Josef Brandstetter

Personal information
- Full name: Josef Brandstetter
- Date of birth: 7 November 1891
- Place of birth: Vienna, Austria-Hungary
- Date of death: 25 March 1945 (aged 53)
- Place of death: Vienna, Nazi Germany
- Position: Midfielder

Senior career*
Years	Team	Apps	(Gls)
1911–1926	Rapid Wien	235	(23)

International career
1912–1924	Austria	42	(2)
- * Club domestic league appearances and goals

Josef "Sepp" Brandstetter (7 November 1891 – 25 March 1945) was an Austrian amateur football (soccer) player.

== International career ==
He was a member of the Austrian Olympic squad at the 1912 Summer Olympics and played two matches in the main tournament as well as three matches in the consolation tournament.

For the Austria national football team he played 42 games and scored 2 goals.

== Management ==
Brandstetter was also a team coach. Clubs managed include HŠK Građanski Zagreb, Wiener Sport-Club and SpVgg Hard.

== Honours ==
- Austrian Championship (8):
  - 1912, 1913, 1916, 1917, 1919, 1920, 1921, 1923
- Austrian Cup (2):
  - 1919, 1920
