= Richard Kuthan =

Austrian footballer (1891–1958)

Personal information
- Date of birth: 3 July 1891
- Date of death: 10 February 1958 (aged 66)
- Position: Forward

Senior career*
Years	Team	Apps	(Gls)
1911–1926	Rapid	228	(153+)
1926–1927	SC Wacker Wien		
1927–1939	Rapid	16	(11)

International career
1912–1928	Austria	24	(14)
- * Club domestic league appearances and goals

Richard "Rigo" Kuthan (3 July 1891 – 10 February 1958) was an Austrian international footballer.
