= 1928–29 SK Rapid Wien season =

Rapid Wien
1928–29 season
- Coach: Eduard Bauer
- Stadium: Pfarrwiese, Vienna, Austria
- First class: Champions (9th title)
- Austrian Cup: Runner-up
- Mitropa Cup: Runner-up
- Top goalscorer: League: Franz Weselik (13); All: Franz Weselik (34)
- Highest home attendance: 38,000
- Lowest home attendance: 3,000
- Average home league attendance: 10,300

The 1928–29 SK Rapid Wien season was the 31st season in club history.

== Squad ==
=== Squad statistics ===
Nat.	Name	League		Cup		Mitropa Cup		Total		Discipline
Nat.	Name	Apps	Goals	Apps	Goals	Apps	Goals	Apps	Goals	Red card
Goalkeepers
(Austria)	Walter Feigl	3						3		
(Austria)	Franz Griftner	15		6		6		27		
(Austria)	Franz Hribar	4				2		6		
Defenders
(Austria)	Leopold Czejka	14		5				19		
(Austria)	Franz Kral	5		1		1		7		
(Austria)	Roman Schramseis	22		6	1	8		36	1	1
(Austria)	Anton Witschel	3				7	1	10	1	
Midfielders
(Austria)	Josef Frühwirth	9				8		17		
(Austria)	Johann Luef	19		5		3		27		
(Austria)	Josef Madlmayer	19		5		8		32		
(Austria)	Josef Smistik	17	5	6	1	7	1	30	7	
(Austria)	Karl Valchar	1						1		
Forwards
(Kingdom of Yugoslavia)	Mika Babić	2		1				3		
(Austria)	Wilhelm Cernic	1	2			1		2	2	
(Austria)	Johann Hoffmann	9	2	5	5	2		16	7	
(Austria)	Johann Horvath	20	7	6	2	8	6	34	15	
(Austria)	Hans Kaburek	3	2					3	2	
(Austria)	Matthias Kaburek	7	3	3	3			10	6	
(Austria)	Willibald Kirbes	17	7	5	4	8	2	30	13	
(Austria)	Richard Kuthan	5	4			3	1	8	5	
(Austria)	Johann Schneider	4	2					4	2	
(Austria)	Franz Smistik	1						1		
(Austria)	Franz Weselik	20	13	6	14	8	7	34	34	
(Austria)	Ferdinand Wesely	22	10	6	6	8	5	36	21	

== Fixtures and results ==
Win Draw Loss

=== League ===
Rd	Date	Venue	Opponent	Res.	Att.	Goals and discipline
1	01.11.1928	A	Slovan Wien	3-2	7,500	Weselik 76', Horvath 81', Kuthan 85'
2	13.01.1929	H	Hertha Wien	2-1	8,000	Kirbes W. 13', Hoffmann J. 85'
3	02.12.1928	A	Wiener SC	0-1	15,000	
4	25.11.1928	H	Austria Wien	2-2	15,000	Horvath 59', Wesely 80'
5	30.09.1928	A	Admira	2-3	22,000	Weselik 53', Smistik J. 81'
6	14.10.1928	H	FAC	5-1	7,000	Weselik 3' 71', Kuthan 11' 48', Horvath 18'
7	21.10.1928	H	Brigittenauer AC	5-2	7,000	Hoffmann J. 32', Horvath 42', Weselik 53' 72', Wesely 75'
8	15.11.1928	A	Nicholson	2-3	6,000	Kuthan 23', Wesely 70'
9	17.04.1929	H	Wacker Wien	1-0	9,000	Kaburek H. 65'
10	18.11.1928	H	Vienna	3-1	8,000	Schneider 15' 23', Wesely 73'
11	18.06.1929	A	Wiener AC	2-2	7,000	Cernic W. 19' 31'
12	09.06.1929	H	Slovan Wien	5-2	6,000	Kirbes W. 4', Kaburek M. 15', Horvath 79' 87', Weselik 89'
13	30.04.1929	H	Nicholson	3-1	7,000	Weselik 28', Smistik J. 34', Wesely 58' (pen.)
14	05.06.1929	A	Austria Wien	3-1	11,000	Wesely 34' 51', Kirbes W. 80'
15	03.03.1929	H	Wiener AC	3-3	8,500	Kirbes W. 28', Smistik J. 55', Weselik 73'
16	10.03.1929	H	Wiener SC	3-1	18,000	Horvath 19', Wesely 23' 71' (pen.)
17	31.03.1929	A	Vienna	1-0	25,000	Weselik 45'
18	23.05.1929	A	Hertha Wien	2-0	7,000	Smistik J. 42', Kaburek M. 59'
19	28.04.1929	H	Admira	3-0	20,000	Kirbes W. 28', Wesely 43' (pen.), Kaburek H. 47'
20	19.05.1929	A	FAC	2-1	15,000	Kaburek M. 54', Weselik 80'
21	26.05.1929	A	Brigittenauer AC	1-2	5,000	Smistik J. 14'
22	02.06.1929	A	Wacker Wien	4-2	11,000	Weselik 18' 40', Kirbes W. 41' 51'

=== Cup ===
Rd	Date	Venue	Opponent	Res.	Att.	Goals and discipline
R1	20.01.1929	H	Libertas	14-0	4,000	Weselik 2' 36' 38' 40' 70', Hoffmann J. 4' 17', Horvath 7' 45', Wesely 9' 55', Tauer 10' (o.g.), Schramseis 83' (pen.)
R16	03.02.1929	H	FAC	7-0	3,000	Weselik 5' 87', Hoffmann J. 30' 42' 64', Kirbes W. 63', Wesely 70'
QF	24.03.1929	H	Admira	4-3 (a.e.t.)	22,000	Weselik 15' 86' 116', Kirbes W. 40'
SF	21.04.1929	A	Wiener AC	4-4 (a.e.t.)	29,000	Weselik 46' 52' 52', Wesely 116' (pen.)
SF-PO	11.05.1929	H	Wiener AC	6-3	14,000	Kirbes W. 1', Weselik 33', Kaburek M. 53' 78', Wesely 67', Smistik J. 71'
F	30.05.1929	N	Vienna	2-3	35,000	Kaburek M. 44', Kirbes W. 70'

=== Mitropa Cup ===
Rd	Date	Venue	Opponent	Res.	Att.	Goals and discipline
QF-L1	19.08.1928	H	MTK Budapest (Hungary)	6-4	23,000	Kuthan 18', Weselik 32', Horvath 57' 73', Wesely 68' 78'
QF-L2	26.08.1928	A	MTK Budapest (Hungary)	1-3	20,000	Smistik J. 72'
QF-PO	01.09.1928	H	MTK Budapest (Hungary)	1-0 (a.e.t.)	38,000	Witschel 99'
SF-L1	08.09.1928	A	Viktoria Žižkov (Czechoslovakia)	3-4	16,000	Weselik 12' 27' 37'; Schramseis (red card) 43'
SF-L2	16.09.1928	H	Viktoria Žižkov (Czechoslovakia)	3-2	26,000	Wesely 1', Weselik 15', Horvath 47'
SF-PO	03.10.1928	H	Viktoria Žižkov (Czechoslovakia)	3-1	15,000	Horvath 8' 14' (pen.), Weselik 32'
F-L1	28.10.1928	A	Ferencváros (Hungary)	1-7	20,000	Horvath 85'
F-L2	11.11.1928	H	Ferencváros (Hungary)	5-3	20,000	Kirbes W. 5' 22', Wesely 37' 53', Weselik 50'
