= 1927–28 SK Rapid Wien season =

Rapid Wien
1927–28 season
- Coach: Eduard Bauer
- Stadium: Pfarrwiese, Vienna, Austria
- First class: 2nd
- Austrian Cup: Quarterfinal
- Mitropa Cup: Runner-up
- Top goalscorer: League: Ferdinand Wesely (20); All: Ferdinand Wesely (27)
- Highest home attendance: 40,000
- Lowest home attendance: 4,500
- Average home league attendance: 8,800

The 1927–28 SK Rapid Wien season was the 30th season in club history.

== Squad ==
=== Squad statistics ===
Nat.	Name	League		Cup		Mitropa Cup		Total	
Nat.	Name	Apps	Goals	Apps	Goals	Apps	Goals	Apps	Goals
Goalkeepers
(Austria)	Walter Feigl	18		3		6		27	
(Austria)	Franz Griftner	6						6	
Defenders
(Austria)	Leopold Czejka	11				1		12	
(Austria)	Josef Heidingsfeld	1						1	
(Austria)	Otto Jellinek	9		1		3		13	
(Austria)	Franz Kral	2				2		4	
(Austria)	Leopold Nitsch	13		3		6		22	
(Austria)	Roman Schramseis	17		3		1		21	
Midfielders
(Austria)	Maximilian Cernic					1		1	
(Austria)	Edi Frühwirth	1						1	
(Austria)	Josef Frühwirth	1						1	
(Austria)	Josef Madlmayer	19		2		5		26	
(Austria)	Alois Pellet	1						1	
(Austria)	Johann Richter	15		3	1	5		23	1
(Austria)	Josef Smistik	24	1	3		6		33	1
(Austria)	Karl Valchar	1						1	
Forwards
(Austria)	Karl Bauer	2	1			1		3	1
(Austria)	Johann Hoffmann	19	5	1		3	4	23	9
(Austria)	Johann Horvath	18	16	2	2	6	2	26	20
(Austria)	Willibald Kirbes	11	3	3	2			14	5
(Austria)	Richard Kuthan	11	7	1		2		14	7
(Austria)	Johann Luef	16	8	2	3	5	3	23	14
(Austria)	Franz Weselik	15	17	3	1	3	2	21	20
(Austria)	Ferdinand Wesely	23	20	3	3	6	4	32	27
(Austria)	Karl Wondrak	10	2			4	2	14	4

== Fixtures and results ==
Win Draw Loss

=== League ===
Rd	Date	Venue	Opponent	Res.	Att.	Goals and discipline
1	28.08.1927	H	Wacker Wien	1-4	13,000	Luef 26'
2	04.09.1927	A	Brigittenauer AC	5-1	11,000	Wesely 32' 58' 63' 68', Briza 36' (o.g.)
3	11.09.1927	A	Wiener AC	4-1	18,000	Horvath 3' 84', Luef 53', Smistik J. 67'
4	09.10.1927	A	Austria Wien	2-1	16,000	Weselik 20', Horvath 43'
6	16.10.1927	H	Admira	1-3	18,000	Luef 57'
7	23.10.1927	A	Simmering	3-1	6,500	Weselik 19', Kuthan 33', Wesely 46' (pen.)
8	11.12.1927	H	Wiener SC	5-2	5,000	Weselik 23' 42' 82' 87', Luef 37'
9	01.11.1927	A	Slovan Wien	1-2	8,000	Wesely 24'
10	15.11.1927	H	FAC	7-3	5,000	Hoffmann J. 11' 54' 69', Weselik 44', Wesely 45' 77', Bauer K. 86'
11	20.11.1927	A	Vienna	1-4	11,000	Wesely 38'
12	27.11.1927	H	Hertha Wien	2-0	6,000	Hoffmann J. 20', Wesely 72'
13	04.12.1927	A	Hakoah	9-1	5,000	Wondrak 3' 57', Weselik 5' 17', Luef 27' 74', Wesely 67' (pen.) 86' (pen.), Hoffmann J. 76'
14	12.02.1928	A	Admira	1-3	18,000	Weselik 6'
15	19.02.1928	H	Simmering	1-3	5,000	Horvath 8'
16	26.02.1928	H	Brigittenauer AC	6-1	7,000	Horvath 9' 75' 87', Wesely 45' (pen.) 58' (pen.), Kuthan 90'
17	04.03.1928	H	Austria Wien	4-2	12,500	Regnard 7' (o.g.), Horvath 38', Weselik 57' 65'
18	11.03.1928	H	Vienna	7-2	5,000	Weselik 15', Kirbes W. 23', Wesely 24', Horvath 28' 32', Kuthan 57' 67'
19	18.03.1928	A	FAC	5-4	13,000	Weselik 2' 62', Kuthan 4', Horvath 58', Kirbes W. 77'
20	08.04.1928	H	Hakoah	4-2	13,000	Horvath 17' 23', Kuthan 78', Wesely 88' (pen.)
21	15.04.1928	A	Wacker Wien	3-2	13,000	Wesely 17', Kuthan 20', Luef 70'
23	29.04.1928	H	Slovan Wien	3-1	7,000	Weselik 47' 67', Horvath 51'
24	13.05.1928	A	Hertha Wien	1-0	35,000	Luef 57'
25	03.06.1928	H	Wiener AC	4-2	9,500	Horvath 22' 84', Kirbes W. 37', Wesely 90' (pen.)
26	16.06.1928	A	Wiener SC	2-1	5,000	Wesely 11' 34'

=== Cup ===
Rd	Date	Venue	Opponent	Res.	Att.	Goals and discipline
R1	22.01.1928	H	Wiener Viktoria	8-0	4,500	Kirbes W. 17', Wesely 21' 77', Horvath 40' 78', Luef 55' 69', Richter 63'
R16	05.02.1928	H	Vienna	3-1	12,000	Luef 16', Wesely 32', Weselik 37'
QF	25.03.1928	A	Hertha Wien	1-3	9,500	Kirbes W. 4'

=== Mitropa Cup ===
Rd	Date	Venue	Opponent	Res.	Att.	Goals and discipline
QF-L1	14.08.1927	H	Hajduk Split (Kingdom of Yugoslavia)	8-1	18,000	Hoffmann J. 34' 46' 54', Wondrak 50', Wesely 61' 66', Horvath 70', Luef 80'
QF-L2	21.08.1927	A	Hajduk Split (Kingdom of Yugoslavia)	1-0	6,000	Hoffmann J. 81'
SF-L1	28.09.1927	A	Slavia Prague (Czechoslovakia)	2-2	12,000	Horvath 58', Luef 59'
SF-L2	02.10.1927	H	Slavia Prague (Czechoslovakia)	2-1	30,000	Wondrak 80', Wesely 83'
F-L1	30.10.1927	A	Sparta Prague (Czechoslovakia)	2-6	25,000	Weselik 15', Wesely 34'
F-L2	13.11.1927	H	Sparta Prague (Czechoslovakia)	2-1	40,000	Weselik 5', Luef 55'
