= 1925–26 SK Rapid Wien season =

Rapid Wien
1925–26 season
- Coach: Stanley Willmott
- Stadium: Pfarrwiese, Vienna, Austria
- First class: 5th
- Austrian Cup: 1st round
- Top goalscorer: League: Ferdinand Wesely (18); All: Ferdinand Wesely (18)
- Highest home attendance: 25,000
- Lowest home attendance: 4,000
- Average home league attendance: 12,300

The 1925–26 SK Rapid Wien season was the 28th season in club history.

== Squad ==
=== Squad statistics ===
Nat.	Name	League		Cup		Total	
Nat.	Name	Apps	Goals	Apps	Goals	Apps	Goals
Goalkeepers
(Austria)	Walter Feigl	6				6	
(Austria)	Franz Griftner	2				2	
(Austria)	Otto Janczik	16		1		17	
Defenders
(Austria)	Leopold Czejka	13				13	
(Austria)	Emil Regnard	4		1		5	
(Austria)	Roman Schramseis	10				10	
(Austria)	Franz Solil	21	2	1		22	2
Midfielders
(Austria)	Josef Brandstetter	6				6	
(Austria)	Josef Madlmayer	20		1		21	
(Austria)	Leopold Nitsch	23		1		24	
(Austria)	Johann Richter	23		1		24	
Forwards
(Austria)	Eduard Bauer	6	3			6	3
(Austria)	Heinrich Budin	3	1			3	1
(Austria)	Eppensteiner			1		1	
(Austria)	Johann Hoffmann	15	9	1		16	9
(Austria)	Willibald Kirbes	17	4	1		18	4
(Austria)	Richard Kuthan	6	1			6	1
(Austria)	Franz Weselik	20	14			20	14
(Austria)	Ferdinand Wesely	24	18	1		25	18
(Austria)	Karl Wondrak	21	7	1		22	7
(Austria)	Anton Zach	8	2			8	2

== Fixtures and results ==
Win Draw Loss

=== League ===
Rd	Date	Venue	Opponent	Res.	Att.	Goals and discipline
1	30.08.1925	A	FAC	1–2	10,000	Wesely 24'
2	06.09.1925	H	Wacker Wien	5–3	15,000	Wesely 4' (pen.), Wondrak 30' 63', Bauer E. 33', Weselik 90'
3	04.10.1925	A	Vienna	3–2	10,000	Weselik 40' 88', Wondrak 81'
4	10.01.1926	H	Wiener SC	5–2	17,000	Wesely 8' 30' (pen.), Hoffmann J., Kirbes W. 32', Weselik 52'
5	25.10.1925	A	Simmering	3–3	12,000	Weselik 17' 29', Bauer E. 59'
6	01.11.1925	H	Wiener AC	1–2	15,000	Wesely (pen.)
7	22.11.1925	A	Hakoah	3–1	18,000	Wondrak 46', Weselik 54', Hoffmann J. 88'
9	20.12.1925	H	Hertha Wien	4–3	6,000	Weselik 18', Hoffmann J. 22' 47', Wesely 49' (pen.)
10	29.11.1925	A	Admira	2–0	3,000	Kirbes W. 54' 60'
11	06.12.1925	H	Rudolfshügel	6–4	4,000	Wesely 1' 4' (pen.), Wondrak, Weselik 47', Hoffmann J.
12	15.11.1925	A	Amateure	1–5	15,000	Wesely 82'
13	11.10.1925	H	Slovan Wien	4–5	15,000	Bauer E., Wesely (pen.) (pen.), Kuthan
14	21.03.1926	H	Hakoah	3–3	15,000	Weselik 6', Solil 36' (pen.), Zach 70'
15	07.03.1926	A	Wiener AC	1–3	16,000	Weselik 69'
16	13.05.1926	H	Simmering	2–1	8,000	Wesely 49', Weselik 51'
17	04.04.1926	A	Slovan Wien	4–4	28,000	Hoffmann J. 3' 31', Wondrak 10', Wesely 34'
18	11.04.1926	H	Vienna	1–0	14,000	Budin 26'
19	03.06.1926	H	FAC	2–0	6,000	Hoffmann J., Solil 74'
20	25.04.1926	H	Admira	0–1	8,000	
21	09.05.1926	H	Amateure	0–5	25,000	
22	23.05.1926	A	Wiener SC	2–3	16,000	Wesely 56' 69'
23	06.06.1926	A	Wacker Wien	2–3	7,000	Wesely 8', Wondrak 80'
24	16.05.1926	A	Rudolfshügel	3–1	5,000	Wesely 15', Weselik 41', Zach 86'
25	28.02.1926	A	Hertha Wien	3–1	12,000	Hoffmann J. 26', Kirbes W. 49', Wesely 86' (pen.)

=== Cup ===
Rd	Date	Venue	Opponent	Res.	Att.	Goals and discipline
R1	14.02.1926	H	Brigittenauer AC	0–3	5,000	
