= 1929–30 SK Rapid Wien season =

Rapid Wien
1929–30 season
- Coach: Eduard Bauer
- Stadium: Pfarrwiese, Vienna, Austria
- First class: Champions (10th title)
- Austrian Cup: Semifinals
- Mitropa Cup: Semifinals
- Top goalscorer: League: Franz Weselik (24); All: Franz Weselik (35)
- Highest home attendance: 22,700
- Lowest home attendance: 3,000
- Average home league attendance: 14,800

The 1929–30 SK Rapid Wien season was the 32nd season in club history.

== Squad ==
=== Squad statistics ===
Nat.	Name	League		Cup		Mitropa Cup		Total		Discipline
Nat.	Name	Apps	Goals	Apps	Goals	Apps	Goals	Apps	Goals	Red card
Goalkeepers
(Austria)	Josef Bugala	15		4				19		
(Austria)	Franz Hribar	5				5		10		
Defenders
(Austria)	Leopold Czejka	20		3		5		28		1
(Austria)	Roman Schramseis	19		4		5		28		
(Austria)	Anton Witschel	1		1				2		
Midfielders
(Austria)	Wilhelm Dionys	1						1		
(Austria)	Josef Frühwirth	7		1				8		
(Austria)	Johann Hoffmann	7		3				10		
(Austria)	Josef Madlmayer	15		4		5		24		
(Austria)	Karl Rappan	6	2					6	2	
(Austria)	Johann Reithofer	6						6		
(Austria)	Josef Smistik	18	4	4		5		27	4	
Forwards
(Austria)	Johann Horvath	6	1			5	1	11	2	
(Austria)	Matthias Kaburek	17	8	4	7	4		25	15	
(Austria)	Willibald Kirbes	19	5	4	1	5	2	28	8	1
(Austria)	Richard Kuthan					1		1		
(Austria)	Johann Luef	20	10	4	3	5		29	13	
(Austria)	Franz Weselik	20	24	4	6	5	5	29	35	
(Austria)	Ferdinand Wesely	18	11	4	6	5	2	27	19	

== Fixtures and results ==
Win Draw Loss

=== League ===
Rd	Date	Venue	Opponent	Res.	Att.	Goals and discipline
1	01.09.1929	A	Admira	0-0	22,000	
2	08.09.1929	H	FAC	1-1	14,000	Horvath 62'
3	22.09.1929	A	Wiener AC	1-1	13,000	Weselik 39'
4	18.08.1929	H	Nicholson	5-0	12,000	Kirbes W. 3' 6', Wesely 60', Weselik 69', Smistik J. 89'
5	13.10.1929	A	Wacker Wien	2-0	17,000	Luef 60', Weselik 70'
6	20.10.1929	H	Wiener SC	5-1	17,000	Luef 19' 25', Kaburek M. 36', Weselik 53' 58'
7	03.11.1929	A	Austria Wien	4-2	18,000	Wesely 24' 60' (pen.), Kirbes W. 40', Smistik J. 77'
8	10.11.1929	H	Vienna	0-0	20,000	
10	24.11.1929	A	Hakoah	6-2	12,000	Weselik 8' 24' 88', Kirbes W. 10' 67', Kaburek M. 68'
11	01.12.1929	H	Hertha Wien	7-4	5,500	Dittrich 15' (o.g.), Kaburek M. 19' 89', Luef 26', Weselik 58', Wesely 69' 87' (pen.)
12	09.02.1930	A	FAC	2-3	10,000	Luef 35', Weselik 59'
13	16.02.1930	H	Hakoah	3-1	9,000	Stroß 14' (o.g.), Wesely 30' (pen.), Weselik 39'
14	23.02.1930	H	Admira	6-0	16,000	Weselik 7' 42' 55' 75', Luef 74', Kaburek M. 83'
15	02.03.1930	H	Austria Wien	4-8	20,000	Weselik 15' 46', Kaburek M. 16', Smistik J. 18'
16	09.03.1930	A	Vienna	1-2	22,000	Rappan 63'
17	30.03.1930	H	Wacker Wien	6-1	12,000	Wesely 5', Weselik 21' 32' 48', Luef 38', Kaburek M. 75'
18	21.05.1930	A	Nicholson	5-2	5,000	Luef 15' 88', Weselik 23' 47', Kaburek M. 36'
19	20.04.1930	H	Wiener AC	2-0	22,700	Weselik 30', Wesely 54'
21	18.05.1930	A	Hertha Wien	2-0	4,000	Wesely 28' 30'
22	25.05.1930	A	Wiener SC	5-1	18,000	Luef 5', Rappan 24', Wesely 50', Weselik 79', Smistik J. 85'

=== Cup ===
Rd	Date	Venue	Opponent	Res.	Att.	Goals and discipline
R1	19.01.1930	H	Neubau	17-0	3,000	Weselik 3' 20' 35' 63', Kaburek M. 9' 10' 12' 34' 72' 86', Wesely 15' 23' 58', Luef 22' 38', Kirbes W. 29'
R16	02.02.1930	H	Wacker Wien	3-2	17,000	Kaburek M. 2', Wesely 58' (pen.), Luef 85'
QF	16.03.1930	H	Nicholson	3-2 (a.e.t.)	9,000	Weselik 50' 111', Wesely 82'
SF	27.04.1930	A	Vienna	0-4	12,000	

=== Mitropa Cup ===
Rd	Date	Venue	Opponent	Res.	Att.	Goals and discipline
QF-L1	23.06.1929	H	Genova 1893 (Italy)	5-1	22,000	Weselik 8' 82', Wesely 30' (pen.) 72', Kirbes W. 39'
QF-L2	07.07.1929	A	Genova 1893 (Italy)	0-0	15,000	
SF-L1	21.08.1929	A	Újpest (Hungary)	1-2	6,000	Weselik 46'
SF-L2	25.08.1929	H	Újpest (Hungary)	3-2	22,000	Weselik 1', Kirbes W. 27', Horvath 52'
SF-PO	26.09.1929	N	Újpest (Hungary)	1-3 (a.e.t.)	14,000	Weselik 26'; Czejka (red card) 111', Kirbes W. (red card) 111'
