= 1930–31 SK Rapid Wien season =

Rapid Wien
1930–31 season
- Coach: Eduard Bauer
- Stadium: Pfarrwiese, Vienna, Austria
- First class: 3rd
- Austrian Cup: 7th (tournament held in league mode)
- Mitropa Cup: Winner (1st title)
- Top goalscorer: League: Franz Weselik (16); All: Franz Weselik (25)
- Highest home attendance: 40,000
- Lowest home attendance: 1,000
- Average home league attendance: 10,500

The 1930–31 SK Rapid Wien season was the 33rd season in club history.

== Squad ==
=== Squad statistics ===
Nat.	Name	League		Cup		Mitropa Cup		Total	
Nat.	Name	Apps	Goals	Apps	Goals	Apps	Goals	Apps	Goals
Goalkeepers
(Austria)	Josef Bugala	16		7		6		29	
(Austria)	Rudolf Raftl	2		2				4	
Defenders
(Austria)	Leopold Czejka	18		5		6		29	
(Austria)	Otto Karpfel			1				1	
(Austria)	Roman Schramseis	17		7		6		30	
(Austria)	Anton Witschel	1		5				6	
Midfielders
(Austria)	Karl Rappan	13		6		6		25	
(Austria)	Josef Smistik	18	2	9	1	6	1	33	4
(Austria)	Johann Vana	14		9		5		28	
(Austria)	Franz Wagner	3		2				5	
Forwards
(Austria)	Franz Binder	1	2	2				3	2
(Austria)	Johann Hoffmann	1		1	1			2	1
(Austria)	Hans Kaburek			2				2	
(Austria)	Matthias Kaburek	18	14	7	5	6	4	31	23
(Austria)	Willibald Kirbes	15	7	5	1	6	1	26	9
(Austria)	Karl Langer	4	1	3				7	1
(Austria)	Johann Luef	16	12	5	2	4	3	25	17
(Austria)	Hans Pesser			2				2	
(Austria)	Franz Schilling	3	3	3	4			6	7
(Austria)	Johann Schneider			1				1	
(Austria)	Stefan Skoumal	6		2		2		10	
(Austria)	Franz Smistik	6	2	4		1		11	2
(Austria)	Franz Weselik	17	16	6	6	6	3	29	25
(Austria)	Ferdinand Wesely	9	4	3	3	6	4	18	11

== Fixtures and results ==
Win Draw Loss

=== League ===
Rd	Date	Venue	Opponent	Res.	Att.	Goals and discipline
1	31.08.1930	A	Austria Wien	2-4	16,000	Weselik 31' 70'
2	07.09.1930	A	FAC	2-0	10,000	Weselik 66', Luef 72'
3	14.09.1930	H	Wiener SC	4-0	7,000	Weselik 53' 77', Wesely 57' (pen.), Kaburek M. 75'
4	28.09.1930	A	Vienna	3-0	24,000	Weselik 20' 65', Kirbes W. 52'
5	05.10.1930	H	Wiener AC	6-3	10,000	Kirbes W. 16', Kaburek M. 34' 67', Smistik J. 44', Luef 59', Wesely 80'
6	12.10.1930	A	Slovan Wien	4-1	18,000	Kaburek M. 36', Binder 78' 87', Kirbes W. 80'
7	19.10.1930	H	Wacker Wien	2-1	10,000	Madlmayer 50' (o.g.), Weselik 75'
8	08.11.1930	H	Nicholson	5-1	7,000	Smistik J. 2', Wesely 5' 47' (pen.), Weselik 41', Luef 43'
9	30.11.1930	H	Admira	2-3	22,000	Kirbes W. 30' 74'
10	08.03.1931	H	FAC	8-0	2,000	Luef 30', Langer 40', Weselik 63' 88', Kaburek M. 77' 81' 87', Kirbes W. 89'
11	15.03.1931	A	Admira	3-3	25,000	Weselik 26', Luef 30', Kirbes W. 85'
12	22.03.1931	H	Vienna	0-2	22,000	
13	29.03.1931	A	Wacker Wien	3-3	8,000	Weselik 66', Luef 71', Kaburek M. 82'
14	19.04.1931	H	Slovan Wien	6-1	6,100	Kaburek M. 5' 77', Luef 28' 30' 74', Weselik 46'
15	26.04.1931	A	Wiener AC	4-3	18,000	Smistik F. 25' 34', Luef 53', Weselik 76' (pen.)
16	10.05.1931	H	Austria Wien	4-3	8,000	Weselik 33', Schilling 39' 72', Kaburek M. 44'
17	31.05.1931	A	Nicholson	0-1	6,000	
18	07.06.1931	A	Wiener SC	6-4	11,000	Kaburek M. 13' 44' 70', Luef 30' 35', Schilling 59'

=== Cup ===
Rd	Date	Venue	Opponent	Res.	Att.	Goals and discipline
1	11.01.1931	A	Admira	2-6	7,000	Wesely 30' (pen.), Weselik 45'
2	18.01.1931	A	Wiener AC	4-4	6,000	Luef 19', Kirbes W. 34', Wesely 49' (pen.) 50' (pen.)
3	25.01.1931	H	Nicholson	5-1	7,000	Kaburek M. 41' 65', Weselik 49' 55', Luef 69'
4	01.02.1931	H	FAC	4-1	5,000	Kaburek M. 26' 67' 75', Weselik 62'
5	01.03.1931	A	Vienna	0-4	6,000	
6	25.03.1931	A	Slovan Wien	1-2	3,000	Smistik J. 75'
7	01.04.1931	A	Austria Wien	0-1	3,000	
8	28.04.1931	A	Wiener SC	2-3	1,000	Schilling 4' 69'
9	06.05.1931	H	Wacker Wien	5-2	1,000	Weselik 5' 50' (pen.), Schilling 16' 32', Hoffmann J.

=== Mitropa Cup ===
Rd	Date	Venue	Opponent	Res.	Att.	Goals and discipline
QF-L1	13.07.1930	A	Genova 1893 (Italy)	1-1	12,000	Luef 60'
QF-L2	03.09.1930	H	Genova 1893 (Italy)	6-1	16,500	Kirbes W. 7', Luef 12', Wesely 57' 83', Weselik 76' 81'
SF-L1	08.10.1930	H	Ferencváros (Hungary)	5-1	17,000	Kaburek M. 1' 8' 66', Wesely 30' (pen.) 80'
SF-L2	15.10.1930	A	Ferencváros (Hungary)	0-1	8,000	
F-L1	02.11.1930	A	Sparta Prague (Czechoslovakia)	2-0	25,000	Luef 9', Weselik 57'
F-L2	12.11.1930	H	Sparta Prague (Czechoslovakia)	2-3	40,000	Kaburek M. 17', Smistik J. 67'
