= 1926–27 SK Rapid Wien season =

Rapid Wien
1926–27 season
- Coach: Eduard Bauer
- Stadium: Pfarrwiese, Vienna, Austria
- First class: 3rd
- Austrian Cup: Winner (3rd title)
- Top goalscorer: League: Johann Luef (15); All: Johann Luef (20)
- Highest home attendance: 21,000
- Lowest home attendance: 3,000
- Average home league attendance: 8,500

The 1926–27 SK Rapid Wien season was the 29th season in club history.

== Squad ==
=== Squad statistics ===
Nat.	Name	League		Cup		Total	
Nat.	Name	Apps	Goals	Apps	Goals	Apps	Goals
Goalkeepers
(Austria)	Walter Feigl	17		5		22	
(Austria)	Franz Griftner	6		1		7	
(Austria)	Otto Janczik	1				1	
Defenders
(Austria)	Franz Anderle	1				1	
(Austria)	Leopold Czejka	2				2	
(Austria)	Otto Jellinek	2				2	
(Austria)	Franz Kral	1		1		2	
(Austria)	Roman Schramseis	16		3		19	
(Austria)	Franz Solil	21	7	5		26	7
Midfielders
(Austria)	Josef Madlmayer	17		4		21	
(Austria)	Leopold Nitsch	14		5		19	
(Austria)	Johann Richter	23	1	6		29	1
(Austria)	Josef Smistik	20	2	6	1	26	3
(Austria)	Karl Valchar	1				1	
Forwards
(Austria)	Wilhelm Cernic	1	1			1	1
(Austria)	Rudolf Hanel	11	6	2	3	13	9
(Austria)	Franz Hantschk	1				1	
(Austria)	Johann Hoffmann	13	4	6	5	19	9
(Austria)	Josef Hrabac	1				1	
(Austria)	Willibald Kirbes	22	7	6	3	28	10
(Austria)	Johann Luef	12	15	6	5	18	20
(Austria)	Josef Molzer	3	1			3	1
(Austria)	Josef Uridil	5	5			5	5
(Austria)	Rudolf Vsolek	3				3	
(Austria)	Franz Weselik	15	14	3	2	18	16
(Austria)	Ferdinand Wesely	20	11	5	5	25	16
(Austria)	Karl Wondrak	15	8	2		17	8

== Fixtures and results ==
Win Draw Loss

=== League ===
Rd	Date	Venue	Opponent	Res.	Att.	Goals and discipline
1	29.08.1926	A	Slovan Wien	3–4	10,000	Kirbes W. 46', Uridil J. 77', Hanel 87'
2	05.09.1926	H	Wiener SC	2–1	6,000	Uridil J. 73', Wesely 86'
3	12.11.1926	A	Vienna	0–2	9,000	
4	26.09.1926	A	Brigittenauer AC	1–2	12,000	Hanel 70'
5	30.01.1927	H	Wiener AC	2–4	7,000	Luef 9', Wondrak 85'
6	17.10.1926	A	Simmering	2–2	12,000	Solil 27' (pen.), Kirbes W. 76'
7	03.10.1926	H	Hakoah	2–1	16,000	Weselik 10', Uridil J. 75'
8	31.10.1926	H	Rudolfshügel	8–1	6,000	Solil 30' (pen.) 57' (pen.), Wesely 47' 54', Molzer 49', Weselik 50' 52' 75'
9	14.11.1926	H	Admira	6–2	7,500	Weselik 6' 38' 76', Kirbes W. 40', Solil 41' (pen.), Hanel 75'
10	21.11.1926	A	FAC	5–3	13,000	Wondrak 2' 87', Kirbes W. 16', Hanel 30', Wesely 80' (pen.)
11	28.11.1926	A	Wacker Wien	3–1	12,000	Richter 30', Hanel 70', Wondrak 86'
13	22.08.1926	H	Austria Wien	4–1	21,000	Uridil J. 31' 77', Solil 56' (pen.), Kirbes W. 60'
14	13.02.1927	A	Hakoah	4–0	17,000	Luef 7' 30', Kirbes W. 46', Smistik J. 72'
15	27.02.1927	A	Wiener SC	1–4	10,000	Hanel 9'
16	06.03.1927	A	Austria Wien	1–2	18,000	Wesely 80'
17	13.03.1927	H	Vienna	8–1	4,500	Solil 13' (pen.), Luef 27' 31' 53' 71', Kirbes W. 39', Weselik 83', Wesely 89'
18	15.05.1927	H	Brigittenauer AC	1–0	15,000	Hoffmann J. 85'
19	16.04.1927	A	Rudolfshügel	7–3	4,000	Luef 6', Wesely 23', Wondrak 52' 57' 83', Hoffmann J. 76', Solil 88' (pen.)
20	30.04.1927	H	Wacker Wien	5–1	8,000	Luef 34' 39', Wesely 45' 70'
21	08.05.1927	A	Admira	0–2	16,000	
22	15.06.1927	H	Simmering	2–1	4,500	Smistik J. 7', Weselik 31'
23	04.06.1927	H	FAC	10–1	3,000	Wesely 2' 11', Weselik 6' 9' 37' 54' 59', Hoffmann J. 22' 42', Luef 51'
24	12.06.1927	A	Wiener AC	1–4	8,500	Wondrak 25'
25	29.06.1927	H	Slovan Wien	4–1	4,000	Luef 7' 37' 87', Cernic W. 28'

=== Cup ===
Rd	Date	Venue	Opponent	Res.	Att.	Goals and discipline
R1	06.02.1927	H	Vienna	6–4 (a.e.t.)	8,000	Hoffmann J. 27' 99', Hanel 38' 93', Smistik J. 65', Kirbes W. 101'
R16	20.02.1927	H	Akademia	4–0	3,000	Wesely 30' 44', Luef 33', Hanel 83'
QF	27.03.1927	H	Brigittenauer AC	5–1	16,000	Hoffmann J. 18' 58', Wesely 21', Luef 25', Kirbes W.
SF	23.04.1927	H	Admira	2–2 (a.e.t.)	13,000	Hoffmann J. 6', Wesely 113' (pen.)
SF-PO	18.05.1927	H	Admira	4–3	13,000	Wesely 20', Luef 24' 87', Weselik 55'
F	28.05.1927	N	Austria Wien	3–0	17,000	Weselik 8', Luef 24', Kirbes W. 34'
