= 1927 Mitropa Cup =

Tournament details
- Dates: 14 August – 13 November 1927
- Teams: 8

Final positions
- Champions: (Czechoslovakia) Sparta Prague (1st title)
- Runners-up: (Austria) Rapid Wien

Tournament statistics
- Matches played: 14
- Goals scored: 64 (4.57 per match)
- Top scorer(s): (Czechoslovakia) Josef Silný (5 goals)

The 1927 season of the Mitropa Cup football club tournament was won by Sparta Prague in a final against Rapid Wien. This was the inaugural edition of the tournament.

== Quarter-finals ==
Team 1	Agg.	Team 2	1st leg	2nd leg
BSK Beograd (Kingdom of Yugoslavia)	2–8	(Hungary) MTK	2–4	0–4
Rapid Wien (Austria)	9–1	(Kingdom of Yugoslavia) Hajduk Split	8–1	1–0
Sparta Prague (Czechoslovakia)	8–6	(Austria) Admira Wien	5–1	3–5
Slavia Prague (Czechoslovakia)	6–2	(Hungary) Újpest	4–0	2–2

=== First leg ===
BSK Beograd (Kingdom of Yugoslavia)	2–4	(Hungary) MTK
Sotirović; Marjanovic	Report	Jeny; Opata; Kvasz; Skvarek

Rapid Wien (Austria)	8–1	(Kingdom of Yugoslavia) Hajduk Split
Hoffmann; Wesely; Wondrak; Horvath; Luef	Report	Bonačić

Sparta Prague (Czechoslovakia)	5–1	(Austria) Admira Wien
Veselý; Horejs; Maloun	Report	Runge

Slavia Prague (Czechoslovakia)	4–0	(Hungary) Újpest
Soltys; Kratochvíl; Svoboda; Bejbl	Report

=== Second leg ===
MTK (Hungary)	4–0	(Kingdom of Yugoslavia) BSK Beograd
Orth; Molnár; Balasits	Report

MTK won 8–2 on aggregate.

Hajduk Split (Kingdom of Yugoslavia)	0–1	(Austria) Rapid Wien
	Report	Hoffmann

Rapid Wien won 9–1 on aggregate.

Admira Wien (Austria)	5–3	(Czechoslovakia) Sparta Prague
Schall; Sigl; Runge; Stoiber	Report	Veselý; Silný

Sparta Prague won 8–6 on aggregate.

Újpest (Hungary)	2–2	(Czechoslovakia) Slavia Prague
Fogl III	Report	Puč

Slavia Prague won 6–2 on aggregate.

== Semi-finals ==
Team 1	Agg.	Team 2	1st leg	2nd leg
MTK (Hungary)	2–2	(Czechoslovakia) Sparta Prague	2–2	0–0
Slavia Prague (Czechoslovakia)	3–4	(Austria) Rapid Wien	2–2	1–2

=== First leg ===
MTK (Hungary)	2–2	(Czechoslovakia) Sparta Prague
Opata; Jeny	Report	Patek; Silný

Slavia Prague (Czechoslovakia)	2–2	(Austria) Rapid Wien
Kratochvíl; Puč	Report	Horvath; Luef

=== Second leg ===
Sparta Prague (Czechoslovakia)	0–0	(Hungary) MTK
	Report

Sparta Prague was awarded win after MTK fielded an ineligible player.

Rapid Wien (Austria)	2–1	(Czechoslovakia) Slavia Prague
Wondrak; Wesely	Report	Puč

Rapid Wein won 4–3 on aggregate.

== Final ==
Team 1	Agg.	Team 2	1st leg	2nd leg
Sparta Prague (Czechoslovakia)	7–4	(Austria) Rapid Wien	6–2	1–2

=== First leg ===
30 October 1927

Sparta Prague	6 – 2	Rapid Wien
Pešek 1'; Šíma 14'; Silný 33', 76'; Patek 62', 78'	Report	Weselik 15'; Wesely 34' (pen.)

Stadion Letná (Prague)
Attendance: 25,000
Referee: Raphaël Van Praag (Belgium)

Sparta Prague:
GK	(Czechoslovakia) František Hochmann
DF	(Czechoslovakia) Jaroslav Burgr
DF	(Czechoslovakia) Antonín Perner
MF	(Czechoslovakia) František Kolenatý
MF	(Czechoslovakia) Karel Pešek (c)
MF	(Czechoslovakia) Ferdinand Hajný
FW	(Austria) Adolf Patek
FW	(Czechoslovakia) Josef Šíma
FW	(Czechoslovakia) Josef Miclík
FW	(Czechoslovakia) Josef Silný
FW	(Austria) Josef Horejs
Manager:
(Scotland) John Dick

Rapid Wein:
GK	(Austria) Walter Feigl
DF	(Austria) Otto Jellinek
DF	(Austria) Leopold Czejka
MF	(Austria) Josef Madlmayer
MF	(Austria) Josef Smistik
MF	(Austria) Leopold Nitsch (c)
FW	(Austria) Karl Wondrak
FW	(Austria) Franz Weselik
FW	(Austria) Richard Kuthan
FW	(Austria) Johann Horvath
FW	(Austria) Ferdinand Wesely
Manager:
(Austria) Edi Bauer

=== Second leg ===
13 November 1927

Rapid Wien	2 – 1	Sparta Prague
Weselik 5'; Luef 55'	Report	Silný 82'

Hohe Warte (Vienna)
Attendance: 40,000
Referee: Willem Eymers (Netherlands)

Rapid Wein:
GK	(Austria) Walter Feigl
DF	(Austria) Roman Schramseis
DF	(Austria) Leopold Nitsch (c)
MF	(Austria) Johann Richter
MF	(Austria) Josef Smistik
MF	(Austria) Josef Madlmayer
FW	(Austria) Edi Bauer
FW	(Austria) Johann Horvath
FW	(Austria) Franz Weselik
FW	(Austria) Johann Luef
FW	(Austria) Ferdinand Wesely
Manager:
(Austria) Edi Bauer

Sparta Prague:
GK	(Czechoslovakia) František Hochmann
DF	(Czechoslovakia) Jaroslav Burgr
DF	(Czechoslovakia) Antonín Perner	(red card) 62'
MF	(Czechoslovakia) František Kolenatý
MF	(Czechoslovakia) Karel Pešek (c)
MF	(Czechoslovakia) Ferdinand Hajný
FW	(Austria) Adolf Patek
FW	(Czechoslovakia) Josef Šíma
FW	(Czechoslovakia) Josef Miclík
FW	(Czechoslovakia) Josef Silný
FW	(Austria) Josef Horejs
Manager:
(Scotland) John Dick

1927 Mitropa Cup Champions

Sparta Prague
1st Title

== Top goalscorers ==
Rank	Player	Team	Goals
1	(Czechoslovakia) Josef Silný	(Czechoslovakia) Sparta Prague	5
2	(Austria) Johann Hoffmann	(Austria) Rapid Wien	4
2	(Czechoslovakia) Antonín Puč	(Czechoslovakia) Slavia Prague	4
2	(Czechoslovakia) Evžen Veselý	(Czechoslovakia) Sparta Prague	4
2	(Austria) Ferdinand Wesely	(Austria) Rapid Wien	4
6	(Austria) Johann Luef	(Austria) Rapid Wien	3
6	(Austria) Adolf Patek	(Czechoslovakia) Sparta Prague	3
