= 1931–32 SK Rapid Wien season =

Rapid Wien
1931–32 season
- Coach: Eduard Bauer
- Stadium: Pfarrwiese, Vienna, Austria
- First class: 3rd
- Austrian Cup: Semifinals
- Top goalscorer: League: Franz Weselik (21); All: Matthias Kaburek (35)
- Highest home attendance: 16,000
- Lowest home attendance: 1,400
- Average home league attendance: 9,300

The 1931–32 SK Rapid Wien season was the 34th season in club history.

== Squad ==
=== Squad and statistics ===
Nat.	Name	League		Cup		Total		Discipline
Nat.	Name	Apps	Goals	Apps	Goals	Apps	Goals	Red card
Goalkeepers
(Austria)	Josef Bugala	16		2		18		
(Austria)	Rudolf Raftl	6		2		8		
Defenders
(Austria)	Leopold Czejka	9		2		11		
(Austria)	Johann Luef	19	1	2		21	1	
(Austria)	Roman Schramseis	14		4		18		
(Austria)	Anton Witschel	5				5		
Midfielders
(Austria)	Johann Reithofer	1				1		
(Austria)	Stefan Skoumal	21	1	4		25	1	
(Austria)	Josef Smistik	21		3	1	24	1	
(Austria)	Ludwig Tauschek	1		1		2		
(Austria)	Franz Wagner	22		4		26		
Forwards
(Austria)	Josef Bican	8	10	2	2	10	12	
(Austria)	Franz Binder	8	6	2	6	10	12	
(Austria)	Johann Hoffmann	8	3			8	3	
(Austria)	Hans Kaburek	1				1		
(Austria)	Matthias Kaburek	19	19	4	16	23	35	
(Austria)	Willibald Kirbes	17	3	3		20	3	
(Austria)	Robert Menth	1				1		
(Austria)	Hans Pesser	12	4	3		15	4	
(Austria)	Wilhelm Schamschula	1				1		
(Austria)	Franz Schilling	11	2	1	1	12	3	
(Austria)	Johann Schneider	1				1		
(Austria)	Franz Smistik			1		1		
(Austria)	Franz Weselik	20	21	4	8	24	29	1

== Fixtures and results ==
Win Draw Loss

=== League ===
Rd	Date	Venue	Opponent	Res.	Att.	Goals and discipline
1	30.08.1931	A	Vienna	0-3	16,000	
2	06.09.1931	A	Austria Wien	5-3	17,000	Bican 7' 13' 28' 69', Weselik 54'
3	20.09.1931	H	Admira	3-1	9,000	Weselik 30' 37' 42' (pen.)
4	27.09.1931	A	Slovan Wien	10-0	8,000	Hoffmann J. 17' 88', Weselik 25' 40' 43', Kirbes W. 29' 50', Schilling 54', Kaburek M. 70' (pen.) 75'; Weselik (red card) 60'
5	11.01.1931	A	Brigittenauer AC	0-2	16,000	
6	18.10.1931	H	Hakoah	3-1	9,000	Hoffmann J. 39', Weselik 41', Bican 59'
7	13.12.1931	A	Wiener SC	6-1	7,000	Kaburek M. 4' 60' 81', Weselik 26', Binder 62', Pesser 87'
8	01.11.1931	H	Nicholson	2-0	5,500	Weselik 6', Pesser 49'
9	08.11.1931	H	Wacker Wien	0-1	15,000	
10	15.11.1931	A	Wiener AC	4-2	15,000	Weselik 2' 81', Pesser 37', Kaburek M. 40'
11	22.11.1931	H	FAC	3-2	4,000	Kaburek M. 14', Skoumal 57', Pesser 71'
12	07.02.1932	H	Wiener SC	5-4	6,000	Kaburek M. 14' 25' 48' 51', Binder 32'
13	21.02.1932	H	Wiener AC	1-1	12,000	Kaburek M. 48'
14	28.02.1932	A	Nicholson	1-4	6,000	Weselik 73'
15	06.03.1932	H	Slovan Wien	3-2	5,000	Binder 53' 62' 71'
16	13.03.1932	H	Brigittenauer AC	4-0	10,000	Bican 13' 54', Schilling 25', Kaburek M. 51'
17	03.04.1932	A	Hakoah	8-2	10,000	Kaburek M. 8' 26' 62', Weselik 24' (pen.) 27' 64', Bican 75' 82'
18	10.04.1932	A	Admira	1-2	35,000	Bican 34'
19	08.05.1932	H	Vienna	2-1	10,500	Luef 10', Kirbes W. 35'
20	28.05.1932	A	Wacker Wien	2-3	8,000	Weselik 36', Kaburek M. 75'
21	05.06.1932	A	FAC	4-2	5,000	Kaburek M. 63' 75', Binder 67', Weselik 80'
22	12.06.1932	H	Austria Wien	3-2	16,000	Weselik 31' (pen.) 74' 77'

=== Cup ===
Rd	Date	Venue	Opponent	Res.	Att.	Goals and discipline
R1	24.01.1932	H	Landstraßer Amateure	11-3	2,500	Weselik 10' 60' 79' 87', Binder 13' 36' 62' 77', Kaburek M. 43' 61' 63'
R16	14.02.1932	H	Rapid II	8-1	1,400	Kaburek M. 20' 41' 61' 80' 81', Weselik 27', Binder 40' 50'
QF	17.04.1932	H	Ostmark	14-1	2,000	Schilling 4', Kaburek M. 17' 25' 26' 49' 69' 87', Bican 35' 58', Weselik 48' 61' 89', Smistik J. 71' (pen.)
SF	05.05.1932	A	Admira	1-4	26,000	Kaburek M. 19'
