= 1932–33 SK Rapid Wien season =

Rapid Wien
1932–33 season
- Coach: Eduard Bauer
- Stadium: Pfarrwiese, Vienna, Austria
- First class: 2nd
- Austrian Cup: Round of 16
- Top goalscorer: League: Franz Binder (25); All: Franz Binder (32)
- Highest home attendance: 14,000
- Lowest home attendance: 1,100
- Average home league attendance: 7,800

The 1932–33 SK Rapid Wien season was the 35th season in club history.

== Squad ==
=== Squad and statistics ===
Nat.	Name	League		Cup		Total	
Nat.	Name	Apps	Goals	Apps	Goals	Apps	Goals
Goalkeepers
(Austria)	Josef Bugala	11				11	
(Austria)	Rudolf Raftl	11		2		13	
Defenders
(Austria)	Leopold Czejka	15		2		17	
(Austria)	Karl Jestrab	22		2		24	
Midfielders
(Austria)	Hans Pesser	12		2		14	
(Austria)	Stefan Skoumal	13		1		14	
(Austria)	Josef Smistik	18	2	1		19	2
(Austria)	Ludwig Tauschek	3				3	
(Austria)	Franz Wagner	21	1	2		23	1
Forwards
(Austria)	Josef Bican	16	11	2	6	18	17
(Austria)	Franz Binder	20	25	2	7	22	32
(Austria)	Matthias Kaburek	3		2	4	5	4
(Austria)	Johann Luef	19	1	2	2	21	3
(Austria)	Johann Ostermann	15	4	2	2	17	6
(Austria)	Josef Schener	3	1			3	1
(Austria)	Franz Schilling	1				1	
(Austria)	Lorenz Seiter	1				1	
(Austria)	Franz Smistik	3				3	
(Austria)	Rudolf Vytlacil	15	5			15	5
(Austria)	Franz Weselik	20	15			20	15

== Fixtures and results ==
Win Draw Loss

=== League ===
Rd	Date	Venue	Opponent	Res.	Att.	Goals and discipline
1	28.08.1932	A	Libertas	0-0	16,000	
2	04.09.1932	H	Vienna	2-3	10,000	Binder 1' 52'
3	11.09.1932	A	Brigittenauer AC	2-1	5,000	Weselik 65', Smistik J. 75'
4	18.09.1932	H	FAC	1-1	4,500	Weselik 88'
5	25.09.1932	A	Wacker Wien	4-1	16,000	Wagner F. 72', Weselik 73' 87', Binder 74'
6	09.10.1932	H	Wiener SC	5-3	8,000	Schener 2', Binder 7' 54', Smistik J. 39', Weselik 57'
7	16.10.1932	H	Wiener AC	3-1	10,000	Weselik 74', Bican 77' 78'
8	30.10.1932	A	Admira	7-4	16,000	Binder 6' 40' 51' 53' 73' 85', Bican 37'
9	06.11.1932	H	Hakoah	5-2	11,000	Bican 13' 46', Weselik 21' 63', Ostermann 37'
10	13.11.1932	A	FC Wien	1-2	14,500	Bican 72'
11	20.11.1932	H	Austria Wien	0-2	1,100	
12	26.02.1933	A	Wiener SC	4-1	9,000	Bican 12' (pen.) 83', Binder 52' 67'
13	05.03.1933	A	Wiener AC	1-3	35,000	Luef 80'
14	12.03.1933	H	Admira	4-2	12,000	Ostermann 17', Binder 39' 81', Weselik 64'
15	19.03.1933	A	Hakoah	4-0	22,000	Binder 42' 74' 83', Bican 57'
16	26.03.1933	H	FC Wien	2-1	6,000	Binder 3' 87'
17	02.04.1933	A	Austria Wien	2-0	3,000	Vytlacil 59', Binder 66'
18	07.05.1933	H	Libertas	5-1	13,000	Binder 15', Bican 22' 46', Vytlacil 41', Weselik 62'
19	14.05.1933	A	Vienna	1-4	35,000	Weselik 46' (pen.)
20	21.05.1933	H	Brigittenauer AC	3-0	6,500	Vytlacil 9' 58', Weselik 31'
21	28.05.1933	A	FAC	2-1	11,000	Binder 83' 88'
22	17.05.1933	H	Wacker Wien	7-2	4,000	Binder 12', Weselik 29' 40' 49', Ostermann 50' 70', Vytlacil 90'

=== Cup ===
Rd	Date	Venue	Opponent	Res.	Att.	Goals and discipline
R1	12.02.1933	H	Neubau	17-2	3,200	Binder 1' (pen.), Kaburek M. 16', Luef, Bican, Ostermann
R16	19.02.1933	H	Austria Wien	4-6	14,000	Bican 20' 84', Binder 37' 87'
