= 1924–25 SK Rapid Wien season =

Rapid Wien
1924–25 season
- Coach: Dionys Schönecker
- Stadium: Pfarrwiese, Vienna, Austria
- First class: 4th
- Austrian Cup: 1st round
- Top goalscorer: League: Franz Weselik (16); All: Franz Weselik (17)
- Highest home attendance: 30,000
- Lowest home attendance: 8,000
- Average home league attendance: 15,300

The 1924–25 SK Rapid Wien season was the 27th season in club history.

== Squad ==
=== Squad statistics ===
Nat.	Name	League		Cup		Total	
Nat.	Name	Apps	Goals	Apps	Goals	Apps	Goals
Goalkeepers
(Austria)	Walter Feigl	1				1	
(Austria)	Franz Griftner	4				4	
(Austria)	Otto Janczik	10		1		11	
(Austria)	Franz Köhler	5				5	
Defenders
(Austria)	Leopold Czejka			1		1	
(Austria)	Vinzenz Dittrich	12				12	
(Austria)	Otto Jellinek			1		1	
(Austria)	Emil Regnard	11				11	
(Austria)	Franz Solil	17				17	
Midfielders
(Austria)	Josef Brandstetter	20		1		21	
(Austria)	Leopold Nitsch	20		1		21	
(Austria)	Johann Richter	20		1		21	
Forwards
(Austria)	Eduard Bauer	6	1	1		7	1
(Austria)	Josef Hofbauer	9	9			9	9
(Austria)	Willibald Kirbes	4	1	1		5	1
(Austria)	Richard Kuthan	16	6	1	1	17	7
(Austria)	Josef Uridil	5	3			5	3
(Austria)	Franz Weselik	12	16	1	1	13	17
(Austria)	Ferdinand Wesely	20	8	1	2	21	10
(Austria)	Karl Wondrak	18	2			18	2
(Austria)	Anton Zach	10	3			10	3

== Fixtures and results ==
Win Draw Loss

=== League ===
Rd	Date	Venue	Opponent	Res.	Att.	Goals and discipline
1	21.09.1924	H	Slovan Wien	4-2	12,000	Hofbauer 17' (pen.), Kuthan, Zach 83'
2	28.09.1924	H	Hakoah	1-1	30,000	Wesely 58'
3	05.10.1924	A	Simmering	4-5	18,000	Wesely 27' 29' (pen.), Wondrak 54', Kuthan 74'
4	12.10.1924	H	Wiener SC	2-1	10,000	Zach 50', Wesely 62'
5	19.10.1924	A	Wacker Wien	1-2	15,000	Zach 43'
6	01.11.1924	H	Rudolfshügel	4-2	8,000	Kuthan 8' 29', Bauer E. 70', Wesely 76' (pen.)
7	15.11.1924	H	Admira	3-0	10,000	Weselik 3', Hofbauer 22' 70'
8	23.11.1924	H	Amateure	3-0	25,000	Weselik 26' 57' 70'
9	30.11.1924	A	Wiener AC	1-2	18,000	Uridil J. 37'
11	14.12.1924	A	Vienna	0-2	8,000	
12	25.03.1925	A	Hakoah	1-4	30,000	Weselik 83' (pen.)
13	01.03.1925	A	Amateure	3-1	27,000	Wesely 44' 59', Weselik (pen.)
14	08.03.1925	H	Wiener AC	3-3	18,000	Weselik 39' 40', Uridil J. 70'
15	21.05.1925	H	Simmering	4-4	12,000	Hofbauer 15' 21', Weselik 36', Wondrak 62'
16	29.03.1925	A	Slovan Wien	1-1	15,000	Weselik
17	05.04.1925	A	Rudolfshügel	3-2	8,000	Weselik 72' (pen.), Kirbes W. 85'
18	26.04.1925	H	Vienna	1-1	18,000	Weselik 86'
19	10.05.1925	A	Wiener SC	4-1	20,000	Hofbauer 29' 46', Weselik
20	17.05.1925	H	Wacker Wien	3-5	10,000	Weselik 9', Hofbauer 43', Kuthan 57'
22	07.06.1925	A	Admira	3-0	15,000	Kuthan 48', Uridil J. 50', Wesely 65'

=== Cup ===
Rd	Date	Venue	Opponent	Res.	Att.	Goals and discipline
R1	19.08.1925	H	Hakoah	4-5	18,000	Kuthan 58', Wesely 61' (pen.) 71' (pen.), Weselik 74'
