= 1933–34 SK Rapid Wien season =

Rapid Wien
1933–34 season
- Coach: Eduard Bauer
- Stadium: Pfarrwiese, Vienna, Austria
- First class: 2nd
- Austrian Cup: Runner-up
- Mitropa Cup: Quarterfinals
- Top goalscorer: League: Josef Bican (29); All: Josef Bican (35)
- Highest home attendance: 21,000
- Lowest home attendance: 1,400
- Average home league attendance: 12,800

The 1933–34 SK Rapid Wien season was the 36th season in club history.

== Squad ==
=== Squad statistics ===
Nat.	Name	League		Cup		Mitropa Cup		Total	
Nat.	Name	Apps	Goals	Apps	Goals	Apps	Goals	Apps	Goals
Goalkeepers
(Austria)	Rudolf Raftl	22		5		4		31	
Defenders
(Austria)	Leopold Czejka					4		4	
(Austria)	Karl Jestrab	22		5		4		31	
(Austria)	Ludwig Tauschek	22	1	5				27	1
Midfielders
(Austria)	Rudolf Fiala	7		1				8	
(Austria)	Johann Luef	3		1		1		5	
(Austria)	Stefan Skoumal	8		1				9	
(Austria)	Josef Smistik	20		5		4		29	
(Austria)	Franz Wagner	22		5		4		31	
Forwards
(Austria)	Josef Bican	22	29	5	5	3	1	30	35
(Austria)	Franz Binder	22	20	5	7	4	6	31	33
(Austria)	Johann Bogner	2	1					2	1
(Austria)	Franz Chytra	1		1				2	
(Austria)	Franz Fachet					1		1	
(Austria)	Josef Gelegs	1	1					1	1
(Austria)	Karl Hochreiter					3	2	3	2
(Austria)	Matthias Kaburek	16	15	3	11	1		20	26
(Austria)	Josef Kienberger	1	1					1	1
(Austria)	Alois Ohrenberger					3		3	
(Austria)	Johann Ostermann	21	4	5	3	4		30	7
(Austria)	Hans Pesser	18	3	5	1	4		27	4
(Austria)	Wilhelm Sommerauer	1		1				2	
(Austria)	Rudolf Vytlacil	5	1					5	1
(Austria)	Franz Weselik	6	2	2	1			8	3

== Fixtures and results ==
Win Draw Loss

=== League ===
Rd	Date	Venue	Opponent	Res.	Att.	Goals and discipline
1	27.08.1933	H	Vienna	2-0	18,000	Ostermann 5', Bican 58'
2	03.09.1933	A	Hakoah	2-0	12,500	Vytlacil 24', Bican 58'
3	10.09.1933	H	Donau	5-1	11,500	Kaburek M. 15' 25', Bican 22' 79', Binder 71'
4	24.09.1933	A	Austria Wien	0-1	30,000	
5	08.10.1933	H	Admira	6-2	20,000	Kaburek M. 18' 31' 70', Binder 22' 41', Bican 84'
6	15.10.1933	A	Wiener SC	2-1	16,000	Binder 25', Bican 70'
7	22.10.1933	H	Libertas	3-3	9,000	Bican 53', Binder 80' (pen.) 86'
8	22.11.1933	A	Wiener AC	4-3	15,000	Binder 8', Bican 35' 55', Weselik 40'
9	05.11.1933	H	Wacker Wien	6-3	13,000	Bican 19' 68' 90', Binder 35' (pen.) 77', Bogner 83'
10	12.11.1933	A	FAC	4-1	12,000	Binder 28' 81', Bican 47' 71'
11	19.11.1933	H	FC Wien	3-0	11,000	Kaburek M. 39', Binder 46' (pen.), Bican 49'
12	18.02.1934	H	Wiener SC	1-2	9,000	Kaburek M. 70'
13	25.02.1934	A	Libertas	6-3	14,000	Binder 4', Bican 8' 14', Kaburek M. 24' 55', Kienberger 89'
14	04.03.1934	H	Wiener AC	10-0	15,000	Bican 13' 56' 60', Binder 26' 88' (pen.), Kaburek M. 39' 70' 80' 81', Becher 53' (o.g.)
15	11.03.1934	A	Wacker Wien	3-4	15,000	Kaburek M. 40', Binder 53', Bican 75'
16	28.03.1934	H	FAC	2-3	6,000	Bican 42', Binder 66' (pen.)
17	08.04.1934	A	FC Wien	1-2	18,000	Bican 6'
18	22.04.1934	A	Vienna	1-2	20,000	Pesser 28'
19	29.04.1934	H	Hakoah	5-2	12,000	Bican 12' 15' 34' 36', Ostermann 87'
20	01.05.1934	A	Donau	8-1	26,000	Binder 27' 42' 55', Ostermann 37' 52', Weselik 53', Bican 77' 78'
21	06.05.1934	H	Austria Wien	3-0	16,000	Kaburek M. 17', Tauschek 53'
22	13.05.1934	A	Admira	3-0	7,000	Gelegs 8', Pesser 24' 78'

=== Cup ===
Rd	Date	Venue	Opponent	Res.	Att.	Goals and discipline
R1	14.01.1934	H	Rudolfsheim	10-1	1,400	Bican 7' 62', Ostermann 17' 71' 72', Kaburek M. 22' 28' 65' 87', Binder 41' (pen.)
R16	04.02.1934	H	Astoria	8-1	3,000	Kaburek M. 31' 34' 70' 84', Binder 51' 73' (pen.) 87' 90'
QF	14.03.1934	H	Wiener SC	7-1	6,000	Kaburek M. 11' 83' 85', Binder 30' 60', Bican 38'
SF	11.04.1934	H	FC Wien	3-2 (a.e.t.)	7,500	Pesser 3', Bican 17', Weselik 110'
F	10.05.1934	N	Admira	0-8	30,000	

=== Mitropa Cup ===
Rd	Date	Venue	Opponent	Res.	Att.	Goals and discipline
R16-L1	19.06.1934	A	Slavia Prague (Czechoslovakia)	3-1	30,000	Hochreiter 40' 48', Bican 75'
R16-L2	24.06.1934	H	Slavia Prague (Czechoslovakia)	1-1	16,000	Binder 10'
QF-L1	01.07.1934	A	Bologna (Italy)	1-6	18,000	Binder 40' (pen.)
QF-L2	08.07.1934	H	Bologna (Italy)	4-1	21,000	Binder 2' 70' (pen.) 79' (pen.) 85'
