= 1923–24 SK Rapid Wien season =

Rapid Wien
1923–24 season
- Coach: Dionys Schönecker
- Stadium: Pfarrwiese, Vienna, Austria
- First class: 4th
- Austrian Cup: 2nd round
- Top goalscorer: League: Josef Uridil, Ferdinand Wesely (14); All: Josef Uridil, Ferdinand Wesely (14)
- Highest home attendance: 40,000
- Lowest home attendance: 3,500
- Average home league attendance: 15,500

The 1923–24 SK Rapid Wien season was the 26th season in club history.

== Squad ==
=== Squad statistics ===
Nat.	Name	League		Cup		Total	
Nat.	Name	Apps	Goals	Apps	Goals	Apps	Goals
Goalkeepers
(Austria)	Josef Kolar	11		1		12	
(Austria)	Ernst Pauler	7				7	
(Austria)	Ignaz Tiller	4		1		5	
Defenders
(Austria)	Vinzenz Dittrich	11	1	1		12	1
(Austria)	Emil Regnard	9	2			9	2
(Austria)	Franz Schlosser	12				12	
(Austria)	Franz Uridil	11		2		13	
Midfielders
(Austria)	Hans Beran	2		1		3	
(Austria)	Josef Brandstetter	11				11	
(Austria)	Otto Hamacek			1		1	
(Austria)	Karl Klär	18		2		20	
(Austria)	Johann Külf	5		1		6	
(Austria)	Franz Machek	10		2	1	12	1
(Austria)	Leopold Nitsch	9				9	
(Austria)	Engelbert Silbeck	1				1	
(Austria)	Johann Täuber	3				3	
Forwards
(Austria)	Eduard Bauer	11	5			11	5
(Austria)	Johann Hanusch	1				1	
(Austria)	Karl Kirbes			1	1	1	1
(Austria)	Willibald Kirbes	3		2		5	
(Austria)	Richard Kuthan	19	7	2	5	21	12
(Austria)	Ludwig Lacina	2				2	
(Austria)	Anton Lebeda	3	1			3	1
(Austria)	Franz Podpiera	1				1	
(Austria)	Karl Prohaska	2				2	
(Austria)	Johann Richter	13				13	
(Austria)	Josef Uridil	14	14	1		15	14
(Austria)	Karl Uridil			1	1	1	1
(Austria)	Anton Wagner	7	2			7	2
(Austria)	Franz Weselik	10	8	2	1	12	9
(Austria)	Ferdinand Wesely	22	14	1		23	14
(Austria)	Karl Wondrak	10	1			10	1

== Fixtures and results ==
Win Draw Loss

=== League ===
Rd	Date	Venue	Opponent	Res.	Att.	Goals and discipline
1	26.08.1923	A	Hertha Wien	4-3	16,000	Kuthan 6' 35', Bauer E. 20', Uridil J. 73'
2	02.09.1923	A	Wiener SC	2-2	30,000	Wesely 25' (pen.) 55'
3	16.09.1923	H	Amateure	3-1	40,000	Uridil J. 12' 61', Wesely 25' (pen.)
4	07.10.1923	A	Simmering	2-4	15,000	Wesely 9', Dittrich 64' (pen.)
5	30.09.1923	H	Wiener AF	7-1	10,000	Bauer E. 22', Wesely 38' (pen.) 46' 49', Uridil J. 65' 75', Kuthan 90'
6	02.12.1923	A	Wacker Wien	2-4	12,000	Regnard 22' (pen.), Uridil J. 23'
7	20.10.1923	H	Hakoah	2-2	25,000	Bauer E. 18', Uridil J. 82'
8	04.11.1923	A	Ostmark	3-0	15,000	Uridil J. 57' 69' 80'
9	11.11.1923	H	Admira	2-0	8,000	Bauer E. 27', Uridil J. 49'
10	27.10.1923	H	Vienna	3-1	22,000	Kuthan 11' 47', Uridil J. 21'
11	25.11.1923	H	Slovan Wien	6-4	8,000	Bauer E. 8', Uridil J. 16' 30', Regnard 70' (pen.), Kuthan 78', Wesely 89'
12	24.02.1924	H	Ostmark	3-2	12,000	Weselik 13' 23', Kuthan 21'
13	30.03.1924	A	Amateure	2-2	45,000	Wagner A. 1', Weselik 66'
14	09.03.1924	A	Admira	2-1	5,000	Weselik 23' 52'
15	16.03.1924	H	Hertha Wien	3-2	15,000	Weselik 48' 86', Lebeda 90'
16	05.04.1924	A	Vienna	1-5	25,000	Wagner A. 70'
17	13.04.1924	A	Hakoah	0-3	30,000	
18	22.05.1924	A	Slovan Wien	2-3	10,000	Wondrak 44', Weselik 75'
19	18.05.1924	H	Wiener SC	0-3	15,000	
20	12.06.1924	H	Wacker Wien	2-2	8,000	Wesely 34' 37' (pen.)
21	19.06.1924	H	Simmering	1-1	7,000	Wesely 82' (pen.)
22	29.06.1924	A	Wiener AF	3-2	5,000	Wesely 57' 63' (pen.) 65'

=== Cup ===
Rd	Date	Venue	Opponent	Res.	Att.	Goals and discipline
R1	10.02.1924	H	Ober St. Veit	8-0	3,500	Machek 18', Kuthan 20' (pen.) 42' 53' 66', Weselik, Uridil K.
R16	23.03.1924	H	Simmering	1-2 (a.e.t.)	25,000	Kirbes K. 7'
