= 1934–35 SK Rapid Wien season =

Rapid Wien
1934–35 season
- Coach: Eduard Bauer
- Stadium: Pfarrwiese, Vienna, Austria
- First class: Champions (11th title)
- Austrian Cup: Semifinals
- Mitropa Cup: 1st round
- Top goalscorer: League: Matthias Kaburek (27); All: Franz Binder (35)
- Average home league attendance: 9,600

The 1934–35 SK Rapid Wien season was the 37th season in club history.

== Squad ==
=== Squad statistics ===
Nat.	Name	League		Cup		Mitropa Cup		Total	
Nat.	Name	Apps	Goals	Apps	Goals	Apps	Goals	Apps	Goals
Goalkeepers
(Austria)	Rudolf Raftl	22		6		2		30	
Defenders
(Austria)	Leopold Czejka	9						9	
(Austria)	Karl Jestrab	19		6		2		27	
(Austria)	Ludwig Tauschek	17		6		2		25	
Midfielders
(Austria)	Rudolf Fiala	1						1	
(Austria)	Stefan Skoumal	22		6		2		30	
(Austria)	Josef Smistik	14	1	4		2		20	1
(Austria)	Franz Wagner	21		6		2		29	
Forwards
(Austria)	Josef Bican	3	2					3	2
(Austria)	Franz Binder	22	21	6	13	2	1	30	35
(Austria)	Karl Hochreiter	18	17	5	1	2	1	25	19
(Austria)	Matthias Kaburek	22	27	6	4	2	2	30	33
(Austria)	Ernst Letsch	2	1					2	1
(Austria)	Johann Luef	2	1	3				5	1
(Austria)	Johann Ostermann	16	10	3		2		21	10
(Austria)	Hans Pesser	15	3	6	4	2		23	7
(Austria)	Franz Smistik	14	5	3				17	5
(Austria)	Leopold Zeman	3	4					3	4

== Fixtures and results ==
Win Draw Loss

=== League ===
Rd	Date	Venue	Opponent	Res.	Att.	Goals and discipline
1	02.09.1934	A	Libertas	7-1	6,000	Ostermann 28' 89', Binder 37' 68', Bican 38' 39', Kaburek M. 41'
2	09.09.1934	H	FAC	3-0	9,000	
3	16.09.1934	H	Vienna	0-0	10,000	
4	30.09.1934	A	Austria Wien	3-1	20,000	Binder 43', Letsch 60', Hochreiter 70'
5	14.10.1934	H	Wacker Wien	7-5	15,000	Kaburek M. 21' 75' 85', Smistik F. 47', Ostermann 56' 57', Binder 80'
6	21.10.1934	A	Admira	1-1	23,000	Kaburek M. 82'
7	28.10.1934	H	Hakoah	5-1	9,000	Hochreiter 16' 33', Binder 21', Kaburek M. 79' 90'
8	04.11.1934	A	FC Wien	3-3	6,000	Kaburek M. 22' 25', Binder 55' (pen.)
9	02.12.1934	H	Wiener AC	4-2	7,000	Ostermann 49' 53', Smistik J. 85', Hochreiter 90'
10	18.11.1934	A	Wiener SC	3-2	8,500	Kaburek M. 4', Binder 67', Hochreiter 69'
11	25.11.1934	H	FavSC	7-1	8,000	Ostermann 2', Kaburek M. 7' 43', Hochreiter 23', Binder 40' 70', Smistik F. 59'
12	17.02.1935	H	Admira	3-2	15,000	Binder 25' (pen.), Hochreiter 54', Smistik F. 58'
13	24.02.1935	A	Hakoah	8-1	15,000	Kaburek M. 1' 32', Hochreiter 12', Pesser 17', Binder 19' 63', Smistik F. 36' 48'
14	28.04.1935	H	FC Wien	2-0	6,000	Hochreiter 64', Zeman L. 85'
15	10.03.1935	A	Wiener AC	11-2	9,000	Hochreiter 1' 64' 85', Binder 13' 25' 69' 74' 88', Kaburek M. 24' 63' 77'
16	17.03.1935	H	Wiener SC	5-2	12,000	Kaburek M. 2' 10' 25' 52', Pesser 89'
17	01.05.1935	A	FavSC	4-1	7,000	Zeman L. 14', Binder 24' 51', Ostermann 48'
18	07.04.1935	H	Libertas	3-1	9,000	Ostermann 15', Luef 40', Kaburek M. 80'
19	05.05.1935	A	FAC	8-1	6,500	Zeman L. 11' 60', Hochreiter 24' 62', Kaburek M. 28' 33' 35' 63'
20	19.05.1935	A	Vienna	1-1	12,000	Ostermann 40'
21	26.05.1935	H	Austria Wien	5-2	6,000	Kaburek M. 5', Hochreiter 23' 43' 85', Binder 54'
22	02.06.1935	A	Wacker Wien	2-0	12,000	Binder 28', Pesser 44'

=== Cup ===
Rd	Date	Venue	Opponent	Res.	Att.	Goals and discipline
R1	20.01.1935	H	Oberlaa	6-2	1,300	Binder 15' 45' 62' 85', Kaburek M. 40', Pesser 89'
R16	04.04.1935	H	Wacker Wien	3-3 (a.e.t.)	7,000	Kaburek M. 30', Binder 52' 53'
R16-PO	10.04.1935	A	Wacker Wien	3-2	15,000	Binder 52' 66', Kaburek M. 76'
QF	17.04.1935	H	Wiener SC	1-1 (a.e.t.)	7,500	Binder 53' (pen.)
QF-PO	15.05.1935	A	Wiener SC	5-3	8,000	Binder 9' 42', Pesser 45' 78', Kaburek M. 59'
SF	22.05.1935	A	Wiener AC	4-5	10,000	Pesser 17', Binder 22' 53', Hochreiter 88'

=== Mitropa Cup ===
Rd	Date	Venue	Opponent	Res.	Att.	Goals and discipline
R1-L1	16.06.1935	A	SK Židenice (Czechoslovakia)	2-3	12,000	Hochreiter 79', Kaburek M. 85'
R1-L2	23.06.1935	H	SK Židenice (Czechoslovakia)	2-2	52,000	Binder 6', Kaburek M. 56'
