= 1935–36 SK Rapid Wien season =

Rapid Wien
1935–36 season
- Coach: Eduard Bauer
- Stadium: Pfarrwiese, Vienna, Austria
- First class: 3rd
- Austrian Cup: 2nd round
- Mitropa Cup: 1st round
- Top goalscorer: League: Franz Binder (17); All: Franz Binder (24)
- Average home league attendance: 7,800

The 1935–36 SK Rapid Wien season was the 38th season in club history.

== Squad ==
=== Squad statistics ===
Nat.	Name	League		Cup		Mitropa Cup		Total	
Nat.	Name	Apps	Goals	Apps	Goals	Apps	Goals	Apps	Goals
Goalkeepers
(Austria)	Johann Maschke	4						4	
(Austria)	Rudolf Raftl	18		2		2		22	
Defenders
(Austria)	Leopold Czejka	12		2				14	
(Austria)	Karl Jestrab	22		2		2		26	
(Austria)	Heribert Sperner	1						1	
(Austria)	Ludwig Tauschek	10				2		12	
Midfielders
(Austria)	Josef Blaschke	1						1	
(Austria)	Johann Luef	4						4	
(Austria)	Stefan Skoumal	22		2		2		26	
(Austria)	Franz Smistik	4		1		2		7	
(Austria)	Josef Smistik	15	2	2		2		19	2
(Austria)	Franz Wagner	12		1				13	
Forwards
(Austria)	Lukas Aurednik	11	1			2		13	1
(Austria)	Franz Binder	20	17	2	4	2	3	24	24
(Austria)	Rudolf Hawlicek	1						1	
(Austria)	Karl Hochreiter	12	3					12	3
(Austria)	Matthias Kaburek	19	14	2	1			21	15
(Austria)	Johann Meister	16	9	2	2	2		20	11
(Austria)	Johann Ostermann	14	5	2		2		18	5
(Austria)	Hans Pesser	16	4	2				18	4
(Austria)	Walter Probst	5	1			2	1	7	2
(Austria)	Leopold Zeman	3	1					3	1

== Fixtures and results ==
Win Draw Loss

=== League ===
Rd	Date	Venue	Opponent	Res.	Att.	Goals and discipline
1	01.09.1935	A	Hakoah	1-0	9,000	Ostermann 77'
2	15.09.1935	H	Wiener AC	5-3	6,000	Binder 2' 43', Kaburek M. 13' 15' 61'
3	22.09.1935	A	FC Wien	3-1	14,000	Binder 28' (pen.), Hrdlicka 33' (o.g.), Hochreiter 76'
4	29.09.1935	H	Vienna	1-2	13,200	Binder 22'
5	13.10.1935	H	FAC	3-1	6,000	Kaburek M. 5', Binder 14' 66'
6	20.10.1935	A	FavAC	5-1	12,000	Meister 5' 35' 40', Binder 22', Kaburek M. 88'
7	27.10.1935	H	Admira	2-4	20,000	Binder 15' 16'
8	03.11.1935	A	Wacker Wien	2-2	12,000	Meister 4', Ostermann 28'
9	10.11.1935	H	Libertas	1-2	7,000	Kaburek M. 90'
10	17.11.1935	A	Austria Wien	2-0	15,000	Kaburek M. 58', Pesser 75'
11	08.09.1935	H	Wiener SC	3-1	7,500	Kaburek M. 6' 34', Binder 47'
12	24.11.1935	H	FavAC	1-0	2,600	Pesser 29'
13	16.02.1936	A	Admira	5-6	16,000	Binder 40' 42' 77', Hochreiter 67', Meister 89'
14	23.02.1936	H	Wacker Wien	3-3	6,000	Hochreiter 5', Zeman L. 25', Smistik J. 88' (pen.)
15	01.03.1936	A	Libertas	2-1	9,000	Meister 17', Kaburek M. 57'
16	15.03.1936	A	Wiener SC	0-1	6,000	
17	29.03.1936	H	Hakoah	6-0	6,000	Ostermann 40', Probst W. 53', Binder 59' (pen.) 71', Pesser 76' 83'
18	26.04.1936	A	Wiener AC	3-2	5,000	Smistik J. 50' (pen.), Meister 78' 81'
19	01.05.1936	H	FC Wien	5-2	2,000	Kaburek M. 22' 41' 75', Meister 50', Ostermann 86'
20	10.05.1936	H	Austria Wien	2-3	9,000	Binder 37', Ostermann 41'
21	24.05.1936	A	FAC	2-3	5,500	Kaburek M. 34', Binder 42'
22	27.05.1936	A	Vienna	1-2	3,000	Aurednik 62'

=== Cup ===
Rd	Date	Venue	Opponent	Res.	Att.	Goals and discipline
R1	15.12.1935	H	Schwechat	5-3	1,500	Binder 17' 44' 86' (pen.), Kaburek M. 33', Meister 84'
R16	09.02.1936	A	Wacker Wien	2-3	11,000	Binder 4', Meister 70'

=== Mitropa Cup ===
Rd	Date	Venue	Opponent	Res.	Att.	Goals and discipline
R1-L1	21.06.1936	H	Roma (Italy)	3-1	25,000	Probst W. 21', Binder 30' 62'
R1-L2	28.06.1936	A	Roma (Italy)	1-5	6,000	Binder 89'
