= 1928 Mitropa Cup =

Tournament details
- Dates: 15 August – 11 November 1928
- Teams: 8

Final positions
- Champions: (Hungary) Ferencváros (1st title)
- Runners-up: (Austria) Rapid Wien

Tournament statistics
- Matches played: 16
- Goals scored: 87 (5.44 per match)
- Top scorer: (Hungary) József Takács (10 goals)

The 1928 season of the Mitropa Cup football club tournament was won by Ferencváros in a final against Rapid Wien. This was the second edition of the tournament.

== Quarter-finals ==
Team 1	Agg.	Team 2	1st leg	2nd leg
Admira Wien (Austria)	6–4	(Czechoslovakia) Slavia Prague	3–1	3–3
BSK Beograd (Kingdom of Yugoslavia)	1–13	(Hungary) Ferencváros	0–7	1–6
Građanski Zagreb (Kingdom of Yugoslavia)	4–8	(Czechoslovakia) Viktoria Žižkov	3–2	1–6
Rapid Wien (Austria)	7–7	(Hungary) MTK	6–4	1–3

Playoff between Rapid Wien and MTK resulted in 1-0 victory for Rapid Wien.

== Semi-finals ==
Team 1	Agg.	Team 2	1st leg	2nd leg
Admira Wien (Austria)	1–3	(Hungary) Ferencváros	1–2	0–1
Viktoria Žižkov (Czechoslovakia)	6–6	(Austria) Rapid Wien	4–3	2–3

Playoff between Viktoria Žižkov and Rapid Wien resulted in 3-1 victory for Rapid Wien.

== Finals ==
Team 1	Agg.	Team 2	1st leg	2nd leg
Ferencváros (Hungary)	10–6	(Austria) Rapid Wien	7–1	3–5

1928 Mitropa Cup Champions

Ferencváros
1st Title

=== 1st leg ===
October 28, 1928

Ferencváros	7 – 1	Rapid Wien
Szedlacsik 15', 20'; J. Takács 18', 64', 76'; Kohut 56', 58'		Horvath 85'

Üllői úti (Budapest)
Attendance: 25,000
Referee: Albino Carraro (Italy)

FERENCVÁROS FOOTBALL CLUB:
GK	(Hungary) Ignác Amsel
DF	(Hungary) Géza Takács
DF	(Hungary) János Hungler (c)
MF	(Hungary) Károly Furmann
MF	(Hungary) Márton Bukovi
MF	(Hungary) Elemér Berkessy
FW	(Hungary) Imre Koszta
FW	(Hungary) József Takács
FW	(Hungary) József Turay
FW	(Hungary) Ferenc Szedlacsik
FW	(Hungary) Vilmos Kohut
Manager:
(Hungary) István Tóth

SPORTKLUB RAPID:
GK	(Austria) Franz Hribar
DF	(Austria) Roman Schramseis
DF	(Austria) Franz Kral
MF	(Austria) Josef Frühwirth
MF	(Austria) Josef Smistik
MF	(Austria) Josef Madlmayer
FW	(Austria) Willibald Kirbes
FW	(Austria) Franz Weselik
FW	(Austria) Johann Hoffmann
FW	(Austria) Johann Horvath
FW	(Austria) Ferdinand Wesely (c)
Manager:
(Austria) Edi Bauer

=== 2nd leg ===
November 11, 1928

Rapid Wien	5 – 3	Ferencváros
Kirbes 5', 22'; Wesely 37', 53'; Weselik 50'		Kohut 33'; Turay 36'; Szedlacsik 79'

Hohe Warte (Vienna)
Attendance: 20,000
Referee: Albino Carraro (Italy)

SPORTKLUB RAPID:
GK	(Austria) Franz Hribar
DF	(Austria) Roman Schramseis
DF	(Austria) Anton Witschel
MF	(Austria) Johann Hoffmann
MF	(Austria) Josef Madlmayer
MF	(Austria) Josef Frühwirth
FW	(Austria) Willibald Kirbes
FW	(Austria) Franz Weselik
FW	(Austria) Richard Kuthan
FW	(Austria) Johann Horvath
FW	(Austria) Ferdinand Wesely (c)
Manager:
(Austria) Edi Bauer

FERENCVÁROS FOOTBALL CLUB:
GK	(Hungary) Ignác Amsel
DF	(Hungary) Géza Takács
DF	(Hungary) János Hungler (c)
MF	(Hungary) Károly Furmann
MF	(Hungary) Márton Bukovi
MF	(Hungary) Elemér Berkessy
FW	(Hungary) Imre Koszta
FW	(Hungary) József Takács
FW	(Hungary) József Turay
FW	(Hungary) Ferenc Szedlacsik
FW	(Hungary) Vilmos Kohut
Manager:
(Hungary) István Tóth

== Top goalscorers ==
Rank	Player	Team	Goals
1	(Hungary) József Takács	(Hungary) Ferencváros	10
2	(Hungary) József Turay	(Hungary) Ferencváros	8
3	(Austria) Franz Weselik	(Austria) Rapid Wien	7
4	(Austria) Johann Horvath	(Austria) Rapid Wien	6
5	(Czechoslovakia) Jan Dvořáček	(Czechoslovakia) Viktoria Žižkov	5
5	(Austria) Ferdinand Wesely	(Austria) Rapid Wien	5
