= 1927–28 Austrian football championship =

18th season of top-tier football league in Austria

Austrian football championship
- Season: 1927-28
- Champions: SK Admira Wien
- Relegated: Hakoah Vienna; 1. Simmeringer SC

Statistics of Austrian first league in the 1927–28 season.

== Overview ==
It was contested by 13 teams, and SK Admira Wien won the championship.

== League standings ==
Pos	Team	Pld	W	D	L	GF	GA	GD	Pts	Qualification
1	SK Admira Wien	24	18	3	3	69	30	+39	39	1928 Mitropa Cup
2	SK Rapid Wien	24	18	0	6	82	46	+36	36	1928 Mitropa Cup
3	First Vienna FC	24	14	4	6	69	44	+25	32	
4	SC Wacker	24	13	6	5	53	32	+21	32	
5	Floridsdorfer AC	24	11	3	10	59	55	+4	25	
6	ASV Hertha	24	10	3	11	46	52	−6	23	
7	SK Slovan HAC	24	7	7	10	42	45	−3	21	
8	FK Austria Wien	24	8	4	12	45	52	−7	20	
9	Wiener Sportclub	24	6	7	11	37	57	−20	19	
10	Wiener AC	24	7	4	13	50	50	0	18	
11	Brigittenauer AC	24	5	8	11	37	71	−34	18	
12	Hakoah Vienna	24	5	6	13	24	54	−30	16	
13	1. Simmeringer SC	24	5	3	16	42	67	−25	13	

== Results ==
Home \ Away	ADM	AUS	BRI	FIR	FLO	HAK	HER	RAP	SIM	SLO	WAK	WAC	SPO
SK Admira Wien		6–0	2–0	4–2	2–0	4–2	4–0	3–1	10–1	2–1	1–3	1–0	3–1
FK Austria Wien	2–3		3–0	1–3	0–1	4–1	0–1	1–2	2–3	2–1	1–1	3–1	1–1
Brigittenauer AC	1–1	3–1		0–5	1–7	2–2	7–6	1–5	4–1	2–2	3–5	1–6	1–1
First Vienna	2–2	6–2	4–0		3–5	1–1	2–3	4–1	2–1	1–1	4–2	1–4	0–1
Floridsdorfer AC	3–2	3–4	1–1	3–5		2–0	3–3	4–5	5–4	2–1	2–0	1–2	5–1
Hakoah Vienna	0–2	0–0	1–1	0–4	0–1		2–3	1–9	2–1	1–0	0–2	3–1	0–0
ASV Hertha	2–5	3–2	0–0	1–3	2–0	4–0		0–1	4–4	0–4	0–1	3–0	2–4
SK Rapid Wien	1–3	4–2	6–1	7–2	7–3	4–2	2–0		1–3	3–1	1–4	4–2	5–2
Simmeringer SC	1–2	1–2	1–2	0–2	2–2	0–1	2–1	1–3		3–2	1–3	1–3	1–2
SK Slovan HAC	3–1	5–5	1–3	1–3	2–1	3–1	1–2	2–1	2–1		2–2	1–0	1–1
SC Wacker	0–0	2–0	1–1	2–2	3–2	0–1	1–2	2–3	4–1	3–0		4–3	4–1
Wiener AC	3–4	1–2	5–1	1–2	2–3	4–1	2–0	1–4	4–4	2–2	1–1		1–1
Wiener Sportclub	1–2	0–5	4–1	1–6	3–0	2–2	2–4	1–2	2–4	3–3	0–3	2–1	

Legend: Blue = home team win; Yellow = draw; Red = away team win.
