= 1930–31 Austrian football championship =

20th season of top-tier football league in Austria

Austrian football championship
- Season: 1930-31

Statistics of Austrian first league in the 1930–31 season.

== Overview ==
It was contested by 10 teams, and First Vienna FC won the championship.

== League standings ==
| Pos | Team | Pld | W | D | L | GF | GA | GD | Pts |
|---|---|---|---|---|---|---|---|---|---|
| 1 | First Vienna FC | 18 | 12 | 5 | 1 | 53 | 25 | +28 | 29 |
| 2 | SK Admira Wien | 18 | 12 | 3 | 3 | 68 | 37 | +31 | 27 |
| 3 | SK Rapid Wien | 18 | 12 | 2 | 4 | 64 | 33 | +31 | 26 |
| 4 | FK Austria Wien | 18 | 9 | 1 | 8 | 51 | 40 | +11 | 19 |
| 5 | SC Nicholson | 18 | 7 | 3 | 8 | 38 | 38 | 0 | 17 |
| 6 | SC Wacker | 18 | 5 | 6 | 7 | 37 | 51 | −14 | 16 |
| 7 | Wiener AC | 18 | 6 | 3 | 9 | 44 | 47 | −3 | 15 |
| 8 | Wiener Sportclub | 18 | 6 | 0 | 12 | 48 | 65 | −17 | 12 |
| 9 | Floridsdorfer AC | 18 | 4 | 4 | 10 | 31 | 59 | −28 | 12 |
| 10 | SK Slovan HAC | 18 | 1 | 5 | 12 | 21 | 60 | −39 | 7 |

Source: rsssf.com

== Results ==
| Home \ Away | ADM | AUS | FIR | FLO | NIC | RAP | SLO | WAK | WAC | SPO |
|---|---|---|---|---|---|---|---|---|---|---|
| SK Admira Wien | | 3–0 | 1–3 | 6–2 | 2–2 | 3–3 | 3–0 | 7–2 | 5–2 | 1–5 |
| FK Austria Wien | 3–3 | | 1–4 | 7–1 | 4–0 | 4–2 | 6–1 | 2–1 | 5–3 | 4–1 |
| First Vienna | 5–4 | 3–1 | | 8–2 | 3–0 | 0–3 | 1–1 | 1–1 | 3–2 | 7–2 |
| Floridsdorfer AC | 2–4 | 1–2 | 2–2 | | 1–1 | 0–2 | 5–2 | 0–2 | 2–2 | 3–2 |
| SC Nicholson | 1–3 | 2–1 | 3–4 | 2–3 | | 1–0 | 2–1 | 2–5 | 8–0 | 5–2 |
| SK Rapid Wien | 2–3 | 4–3 | 0–2 | 8–0 | 5–1 | | 6–1 | 2–1 | 6–3 | 4–0 |
| SK Slovan HAC | 2–4 | 2–0 | 0–4 | 1–3 | 1–1 | 1–4 | | 2–2 | 1–1 | 1–2 |
| SC Wacker | 1–5 | 0–4 | 1–1 | 3–3 | 0–4 | 3–3 | 1–1 | | 2–1 | 3–6 |
| Wiener AC | 1–2 | 5–1 | 1–1 | 2–0 | 3–2 | 3–4 | 6–0 | 2–3 | | 3–0 |
| Wiener Sportclub | 1–9 | 4–3 | 0–1 | 3–1 | 0–1 | 4–6 | 9–3 | 5–6 | 2–4 | |

Legend: Blue = home team win; Yellow = draw; Red = away team win.
