= Max Leuthe =

Austrian footballer

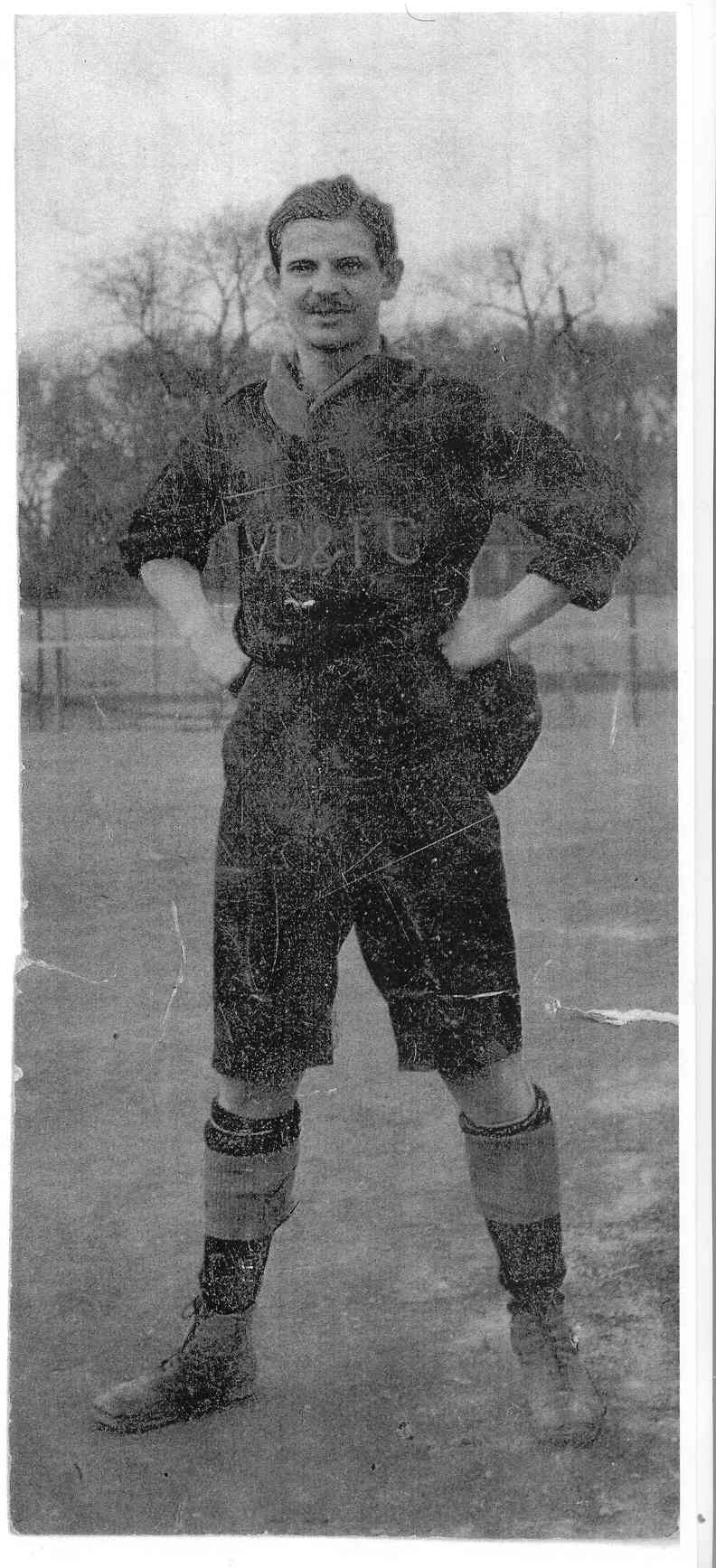

Personal information
- Date of birth: 25 August 1879
- Place of birth: Vienna, Austria-Hungary
- Date of death: 2 December 1945 (aged 66)

International career
Years	Team	Apps	(Gls)
1903–1905	Austria	2	(0)

Max Johann Leuthe (25 August 1879 – 2 December 1945) was an Austrian footballer. He played in two matches for the Austria national football team from 1903 to 1905.
