= Rudolf Vytlačil =

Czechoslovak football player and manager

Personal information
- Date of birth: 9 February 1912
- Place of birth: Schwechat, Austria-Hungary
- Date of death: 1 June 1977 (aged 65)
- Position: Midfielder

Senior career*
Years	Team	Apps	(Gls)
- Phönix Schwechat
1930–1932	SK Slovan Wien		
1932–1934	SK Rapid Wien		
1934	Wiener AC		
1934–1935	Favoritner Sportclub		
1935–1944	Slavia Prague		

International career
1936	Czechoslovakia	1	(0)

Managerial career
- 1946–1947: Meteor České Budějovice
- 1948: Radomiak Radom
- 1948–1950: Tatran Teplice
- 1951–1952: TJ Baník Ostrava OKD
- 1954: Křídla vlasti Olomouc
- 1955: TJ Gottwaldov
- 1956: Radotín
- 1958–1963: Czechoslovakia
- 1964: Czechoslovakia
- 1964–1966: Levski Sofia
- 1964–1966: Bulgaria
- 1966–1968: SK Rapid Wien
- 1969: SK Rapid Wien
- 1968–1970: Levski Sofia
- 1973: Slavia Prague
- * Club domestic league appearances and goals

Rudolf Vytlačil (Czech pronunciation: [ˈrudolv ˈvɪtlatʃɪl]]; German: Rudolf "Rudi" Vytlacil) (9 February 1912, Schwechat – 1 June 1977) was a Czechoslovak football player and manager.

Born in Schwechat on the outskirts of Vienna, Vytlačil started his career at the local club Phönix Schwechat. He later played for SK Slovan Wien, SK Rapid Wien and Favoritner Sportclub in the Austrian Championship and for Slavia Prague in the Czechoslovak Championship.

Vytlačil was the coach of the Czechoslovak national team when they finished as runners-up in the 1962 FIFA World Cup and was in charge of Bulgaria at the 1966 FIFA World Cup.

Vytlačil coached several clubs, including 1947–1948 Radomiak Radom from Poland, Levski Sofia (won two Bulgarian championships in 1965 and 1970, and one Bulgarian Cup in 1970), TJ Baník Ostrava OKD, Tatran Teplice (now FK Teplice), TJ Gottwaldov (now FC Zlín) and, from 1966 to 1968, his former club SK Rapid Wien. With Rapid he won the Austrian championship twice and reached the quarterfinal of the European Champions Cup after a victory against Real Madrid.
