= Josef Horejs =

Austrian footballer

Personal information
- Date of birth: 13 February 1898
- Place of birth: Vienna, Austria-Hungary

International career
Years	Team	Apps	(Gls)
1922–1924	Austria	4	(0)

Josef Horejs (13 February 1898 – ) was an Austrian footballer. He played in four matches for the Austria national football team from 1922 to 1924. prague sparta Horejs was born in Vienna of Czech ethnicity. In 1926, he was among a number of AC Sparta Prague footballers who traveled to the United States for a tour. He also played for Chicago Sparta and the New York Giants during the same stay.
