= Stanley Willmott =

English football manager (born 1898)

Personal information
- Date of birth: 1898
- Place of birth: England
- Position: Half-back

Senior career*
Years	Team	Apps	(Gls)
–1922	Cardiff City		
1922–????	Southampton		

Managerial career
- 1925–1926: Rapid Wien
- * Club domestic league appearances and goals

Stanley Willmott (born 1898) was an English footballer and manager.

== Career ==
As a footballer, Willmott played as a half-back for Cardiff City, before joining Southampton in May 1922, where he primarily played for the club's reserve team. In 1925, at the age of 27, he was appointed the manager of Austrian club Rapid Wien. He was the last Englishmen to work as a coach for the club until Norwich City academy manager Joe Shulberg joined the club as an assistant manager in January 2026.
