= 1928–29 Austrian football championship =

18th season of top-tier football league in Austria

Austrian football championship
- Season: 1928-29
- Champions: SK Rapid Wien
- Relegated: SK Slovan HAC; Brigittenauer AC

Statistics of Austrian first league in the 1928–29 season.

== Overview ==
This was the 18th season of the 1.Liga, and was contested by 12 teams - the top 11 clubs from last season's 1.Liga and SC Nicholson (last season's 2.Liga champions).

== League standings ==
Pos	Team	Pld	W	D	L	GF	GA	GD	Pts	Relegation
1	SK Rapid Wien	22	15	3	4	57	31	+26	33	
2	SK Admira Wien	22	13	4	5	63	30	+33	30	
3	Wiener AC	22	11	8	3	49	28	+21	30	
4	Wiener Sportclub	22	11	3	8	50	43	+7	25	
5	Floridsdorfer AC	22	10	5	7	51	42	+9	25	
6	SC Nicholson	22	11	1	10	47	45	+2	23	
7	First Vienna FC	22	8	6	8	43	35	+8	22	
8	FK Austria Wien	22	8	4	10	40	42	−2	20	
9	ASV Hertha Wien	22	8	3	11	28	53	−25	19	
10	SC Wacker Wien	22	7	4	11	36	41	−5	18	
11	SK Slovan HAC	22	3	4	15	37	71	−34	10	Relegated to 2.Liga
12	Brigittenauer AC	22	4	1	17	26	66	−40	9	Relegated to 2.Liga

Source: rsssf.com

Despite two clubs being relegated, only one club was promoted from 2.Liga (Hakoah Vienna), meaning next season's 1.Liga would feature 11 clubs.

== Results ==
Home \ Away	ADM	AUS	BRI	FIR	FLO	HER	NIC	RAP	SLO	WAK	WAC	SPO
SK Admira Wien		2–1	2–1	0–0	4–4	0–1	3–2	3–2	6–2	2–1	0–0	7–1
FK Austria Wien	0–3		2–1	3–2	2–2	1–1	3–0	1–3	6–3	3–1	0–1	1–3
Brigittenauer AC	1–6	2–3		0–7	1–0	0–1	3–4	2–1	1–3	1–1	0–3	2–1
First Vienna	3–1	0–2	4–1		2–0	0–0	2–1	0–1	1–1	1–1	0–4	1–1
Floridsdorfer AC	1–0	2–2	3–1	0–2		4–2	1–3	1–2	4–2	6–3	2–2	2–0
ASV Hertha	1–7	1–0	5–3	5–4	0–5		2–1	0–2	2–1	0–1	0–2	0–6
SC Nicholson	1–4	3–2	4–2	2–2	4–2	1–2		3–2	2–1	3–1	2–3	3–1
SK Rapid Wien	3–0	2–2	5–2	3–1	5–1	2–1	3–1		5–2	1–0	3–3	3–1
SK Slovan HAC	1–7	1–3	4–0	0–3	1–2	1–1	1–2	2–3		1–6	3–3	2–6
SC Wacker	1–5	2–1	0–1	2–3	2–2	5–0	2–1	2–4	0–2		1–0	3–2
Wiener AC	0–0	3–1	5–1	2–1	1–4	3–1	2–1	2–2	6–1	1–1		1–3
Wiener Sportclub	3–1	4–1	2–0	5–4	1–3	4–2	1–3	1–0	2–2	1–0	1–1	

Legend: Blue = home team win; Yellow = draw; Red = away team win.
