= František Hochmann =

Czechoslovak footballer

Personal information
- Date of birth: 2 April 1904
- Place of birth: Prague, Austria-Hungary
- Date of death: 4 March 1986 (aged 81)
- Position: Goalkeeper

Senior career*
Years	Team	Apps	(Gls)
1925–1930	Sparta Prague		
1930–1933	Bohemians Prague		

International career
1924–1931	Czechoslovakia	7	(0)
- * Club domestic league appearances and goals

František Hochmann (2 April 1904 – 4 March 1986) was a Czechoslovak footballer who played as a goalkeeper. He competed in the men's tournament at the 1924 Summer Olympics. At club level, he played for Sparta Prague (1925–1930) and Bohemians Prague (1930–1933), and won the Czechoslovak First League twice with the former.

== Honours ==
Sparta Prague

- Czechoslovak First League: 1925–26, 1927
