= Johann Richter (footballer) =

Austrian footballer

Personal information
- Date of birth: 15 February 1896
- Date of death: 18 August 1975 (aged 79)

International career
Years	Team	Apps	(Gls)
1923–1927	Austria	10	(0)

Johann Richter (15 February 1896 – 18 August 1975) was an Austrian footballer. He played in ten matches for the Austria national football team from 1923 to 1927.
