= 1920–21 Austrian First Class =

10th season of top-tier football league in Austria

Austrian First Class
- Season: 1920–21
- Champions: SK Rapid Wien (7th Austrian title)
- Relegated: Wiener AC
- Matches played: 144
- Goals scored: 571 (3.97 per match)
- Top goalscorer: Josef Uridil (35 goals)

The 1920–21 Austrian First Class season was the tenth season of top-tier football in Austria. Once again the league expanded to 13 teams with SK Rapid Wien getting their seventh title by six points over second place SV Amateure.

== League standings ==
Pos	Team	Pld	W	D	L	GF	GA	GD	Pts
1	SK Rapid Wien	24	17	6	1	86	39	+47	40
2	SV Amateure	24	15	4	5	66	30	+36	34
3	SC Rudolfshügel	24	9	8	7	44	41	+3	26
4	Hakoah Vienna	24	9	6	9	34	28	+6	24
5	ASV Hertha	24	8	8	8	44	41	+3	24
6	Wiener AF	24	8	8	8	37	36	+1	24
7	Wiener Sportclub	24	8	6	10	41	42	−1	22
8	Floridsdorfer AC	24	7	8	9	44	47	−3	22
9	1. Simmeringer SC	24	8	5	11	38	56	−18	21
10	First Vienna FC	24	7	7	10	33	47	−14	21
11	SC Wacker	24	6	8	10	27	41	−14	20
12	SK Admira Wien	24	6	5	13	40	56	−16	17
13	Wiener AC	24	6	5	13	37	67	−30	17

Source: rsssf.com

== Results ==
Home \ Away	ADM	AMA	FIR	FLO	HAK	HER	RAP	RUD	SIM	WAK	WAC	WAF	SPO
SK Admira Wien		2–3	3–3	2–3	2–1	3–3	1–3	1–4	1–4	4–3	3–1	1–1	1–2
SV Amateure	3–1		4–0	5–2	2–1	3–0	1–1	2–1	10–1	5–1	5–3	0–1	2–0
First Vienna	0–2	0–6		3–2	2–1	1–2	2–8	2–2	0–0	0–0	0–0	1–0	2–2
Floridsdorfer AC	1–0	4–1	3–3		1–0	2–2	3–3	2–2	7–1	0–1	4–3	3–4	1–0
Hakoah Vienna	4–1	1–0	3–1	0–0		1–2	1–1	1–3	5–2	0–1	4–2	2–3	0–0
ASV Hertha	3–1	2–2	1–2	1–0	1–2		2–2	0–3	4–2	2–0	5–0	1–2	1–1
SK Rapid Wien	4–2	1–0	3–2	4–1	1–0	4–1		5–3	2–2	4–0	7–5	4–2	6–0
SC Rudolfshügel	1–3	0–0	2–1	1–1	1–1	2–2	4–3		1–1	3–0	2–1	1–1	1–3
Simmeringer SC	1–2	2–3	1–0	3–1	0–1	1–0	1–2	1–2		3–1	1–0	2–2	2–2
SC Wacker	0–0	1–1	0–1	2–2	0–0	0–4	3–3	2–0	3–1		1–2	0–0	3–1
Wiener AC	2–1	1–0	0–5	1–1	1–1	2–2	0–9	3–2	1–2	2–0		0–4	4–2
Wiener AF	1–1	2–3	1–0	1–0	0–2	2–2	1–3	1–2	2–4	2–2	3–1		0–0
Wiener Sportclub	5–2	2–5	0–1	4–0	1–2	3–1	2–3	4–1	4–0	0–2	2–2	1–0	

Legend: Blue = home team win; Yellow = draw; Red = away team win.

== Top goalscorers ==
As of 23 September 2018.

Rank	Scorer	Club	Goals
1	(Austria) Josef Uridil	SK Rapid Wien	35
2	(Hungary) Kalman Konrad	SV Amateure	22
3	(Austria) Franz Hansl	SV Amateure	21
4	(Austria) Adolf Schöbinger	Wiener AF	19
5	(Austria) Richard Kuthan	SK Rapid Wien	18
