= Johann Horvath =

Austrian footballer

Hans Horvath
Personal information
- Full name: Johann Horvath
- Date of birth: 20 May 1903
- Place of birth: Austria-Hungary
- Date of death: 30 July 1968 (aged 65)
- Position: Inside left

Senior career*
Years	Team	Apps	(Gls)
1920–1927	1. Simmeringer SC	117	(51)
1927–1930	SK Rapid Wien	44	(24)
1930–1933	SC Wacker Wien	51	(11)
1933–1935	FC Wien	27	(12)
1935–1940	1. Simmeringer SC		
Total		239	(98)

International career
1924–1934	Austria	46	(29)
- * Club domestic league appearances and goals

Johann "Hans" Horvath (20 May 1903 – 30 July 1968) was an Austrian footballer. Normally a forward, Horvath was one of the most noted Austrian men's footballers of his generation, and was well–known for his passing ability and technique.

== Club career ==
One of Austria's most prolific strikers of the 1920s, Hansi Horvath played for several club teams in Vienna. He spent most seasons with 1. Simmeringer SC but also played for Rapid Wien with whom he reached and lost the Mitropa Cup final in 1927 and again in 1928.

== International career ==
He made his debut for Austria in a January 1924 friendly match against Germany in which he also scored his first international goal and was a participant at the 1934 FIFA World Cup where he scored 2 goals and the team claimed 4th place. He earned 46 caps, scoring 29 goals. His last international was an October 1934 friendly match against Hungary.

=== International goals ===
Austria's goal tally first

#	Date	Venue	Opponent	Score	Result	Competition
1.	13 January 1924	Städtisches Stadion, Nuremberg, Germany	Germany	3–4	3–4	Friendly
2.	4 May 1924	Hungária körúti Stadion, Budapest, Hungary	Hungary	1–1	2–2	Friendly
3.	21 May 1924	Simmeringer Sportplatz, Vienna, Austria	Bulgaria	1–0	6–0	Friendly
4.	21 May 1924	Simmeringer Sportplatz, Vienna, Austria	Bulgaria	3–0	6–0	Friendly
5.	21 May 1924	Simmeringer Sportplatz, Vienna, Austria	Bulgaria	4–0	6–0	Friendly
6.	22 June 1924	Hohe Warte Stadium, Vienna, Austria	Egypt	3–0	3–1	Friendly
7.	14 September 1924	Hohe Warte Stadium, Vienna, Austria	Hungary	1–0	2–1	Friendly
8.	21 December 1924	Camp de Les Corts, Barcelona, Spain	Spain	1–1	1–2	Friendly
9.	22 March 1925	Hohe Warte Stadium, Vienna, Austria	Switzerland	2–0	2–0	Friendly
10.	5 July 1925	Stockholm Olympic Stadium, Stockholm, Sweden	Sweden	1–0	4–2	Friendly
11.	5 July 1925	Stockholm Olympic Stadium, Stockholm, Sweden	Sweden	2–0	4–2	Friendly
12.	5 July 1925	Stockholm Olympic Stadium, Stockholm, Sweden	Sweden	4–0	4–2	Friendly
13.	10 October 1926	Hohe Warte Stadium, Vienna, Austria	Switzerland	3–0	7–1	Friendly
14.	10 October 1926	Hohe Warte Stadium, Vienna, Austria	Switzerland	4–0	7–1	Friendly
15.	10 October 1926	Hohe Warte Stadium, Vienna, Austria	Switzerland	5–1	7–1	Friendly
16.	7 November 1926	Hohe Warte Stadium, Vienna, Austria	Sweden	1–0	3–1	Friendly
17.	10 April 1927	Hohe Warte Stadium, Vienna, Austria	Hungary	6–0	6–0	Friendly
18.	7 April 1929	Hohe Warte Stadium, Vienna, Austria	Italy	1–0	3–0	1927–30 Dr. Gero Cup
19.	7 April 1929	Hohe Warte Stadium, Vienna, Austria	Italy	3–0	3–0	1927–30 Dr. Gero Cup
20.	27 October 1929	Wankdorf Stadium, Bern, Switzerland	Switzerland	2–1	3–1	1927–30 Dr. Gero Cup
21.	23 March 1930	Letenský Stadion, Prague, Czechoslovakia	Czechoslovakia	1–0	2–2	Friendly
22.	23 March 1930	Letenský Stadion, Prague, Czechoslovakia	Czechoslovakia	2–1	2–2	Friendly
23.	22 February 1931	San Siro, Milan, Italy	Italy	1–0	1–2	1931-32 Dr. Gero Cup
24.	12 April 1931	Hohe Warte Stadium, Vienna, Austria	Czechoslovakia	2–1	2–1	1931-32 Dr. Gero Cup
25.	25 April 1934	Praterstadion, Vienna, Austria	Bulgaria	1–0	6–1	1934 FIFA World Cup qualification
26.	25 April 1934	Praterstadion, Vienna, Austria	Bulgaria	2–0	6–1	1934 FIFA World Cup qualification
27.	25 April 1934	Praterstadion, Vienna, Austria	Bulgaria	3–0	6–1	1934 FIFA World Cup qualification
28.	31 May 1934	Stadio Littorale, Bologna, Italy	Hungary	1–0	2–1	1934 FIFA World Cup
29.	7 June 1934	Stadio Giorgio Ascarelli, Naples, Italy	Germany	1–2	2–3	1934 FIFA World Cup

== Honours ==
- Austrian Football Bundesliga (2):
  - 1929, 1930
- Austrian Cup (1):
  - 1929
