= 1929–30 Austrian football championship =

19th season of top-tier football league in Austria

Austrian football championship
- Season: 1929-30

Statistics of Austrian first league in the 1929–30 season.

== Overview ==
It was contested by 11 teams, and SK Rapid Wien won the championship.

== League standings ==
| Pos | Team | Pld | W | D | L | GF | GA | GD | Pts |
|---|---|---|---|---|---|---|---|---|---|
| 1 | SK Rapid Wien | 20 | 13 | 4 | 3 | 67 | 29 | +38 | 30 |
| 2 | SK Admira Wien | 20 | 12 | 5 | 3 | 56 | 34 | +22 | 29 |
| 3 | First Vienna FC | 20 | 12 | 4 | 4 | 51 | 31 | +20 | 28 |
| 4 | Wiener AC | 20 | 10 | 5 | 5 | 39 | 29 | +10 | 25 |
| 5 | FK Austria Wien | 20 | 9 | 2 | 9 | 56 | 43 | +13 | 20 |
| 6 | Floridsdorfer AC | 20 | 6 | 6 | 8 | 35 | 45 | −10 | 18 |
| 7 | SC Nicholson | 20 | 6 | 6 | 8 | 28 | 45 | −17 | 18 |
| 8 | SC Wacker | 20 | 7 | 3 | 10 | 34 | 47 | −13 | 17 |
| 9 | Wiener Sportclub | 20 | 6 | 3 | 11 | 33 | 47 | −14 | 15 |
| 10 | Hakoah Vienna | 20 | 4 | 2 | 14 | 31 | 61 | −30 | 10 |
| 11 | ASV Hertha | 20 | 3 | 4 | 13 | 33 | 52 | −19 | 10 |

Source: rsssf.com

== Results ==
| Home \ Away | ADM | AUS | FIR | FLO | HAK | HER | NIC | RAP | WAK | WAC | SPO |
|---|---|---|---|---|---|---|---|---|---|---|---|
| SK Admira Wien | | 2–1 | 3–2 | 0–0 | 4–4 | 3–2 | 6–2 | 0–0 | 3–1 | 2–5 | 6–2 |
| FK Austria Wien | 1–4 | | 3–4 | 3–0 | 4–5 | 3–1 | 5–1 | 2–4 | 1–2 | 0–2 | 0–1 |
| First Vienna | 0–3 | 0–3 | | 5–0 | 4–3 | 3–1 | 1–1 | 2–1 | 3–2 | 2–1 | 4–1 |
| Floridsdorfer AC | 1–4 | 1–3 | 3–3 | | 5–2 | 1–1 | 1–1 | 3–2 | 0–5 | 2–3 | 3–2 |
| Hakoah Vienna | 0–3 | 0–3 | 1–6 | 0–4 | | 3–2 | 1–2 | 2–6 | 1–0 | 0–2 | 1–3 |
| ASV Hertha | 4–2 | 2–6 | 1–0 | 2–1 | 2–3 | | 1–3 | 0–2 | 2–2 | 2–2 | 1–1 |
| SC Nicholson | 1–1 | 3–3 | 0–2 | 1–3 | 0–0 | 3–2 | | 2–5 | 3–2 | 0–1 | 1–0 |
| SK Rapid Wien | 6–0 | 4–8 | 0–0 | 1–1 | 3–1 | 7–4 | 5–0 | | 6–1 | 2–0 | 5–1 |
| SC Wacker | 0–6 | 1–0 | 1–5 | 4–2 | 4–2 | 2–1 | 2–2 | 0–2 | | 2–4 | 2–1 |
| Wiener AC | 1–1 | 3–3 | 2–4 | 0–1 | 2–1 | 3–2 | 3–0 | 1–1 | 0–0 | | 2–1 |
| Wiener Sportclub | 1–3 | 3–4 | 1–1 | 3–3 | 2–1 | 2–0 | 1–2 | 1–5 | 3–1 | 3–2 | |

Legend: Blue = home team win; Yellow = draw; Red = away team win.
