= Emil Regnard =

Austrian footballer

Personal information
- Date of birth: 8 September 1897
- Date of death: April 1962 (aged 64)

International career
Years	Team	Apps	(Gls)
1923–1927	Austria	6	(0)

Emil Regnard (8 September 1897 – April 1962) was an Austrian footballer. He played in six matches for the Austria national football team from 1923 to 1927.
