= Josef Frühwirth =

Austrian footballer (1907–1944)

Personal information
- Date of birth: 29 May 1907
- Date of death: January 1944 (aged 36)
- Position: Midfielder

Senior career*
Years	Team	Apps	(Gls)
1927–1930	Rapid	17	(0)
1930–1932	SC Wacker Wien		
1932–1936	FC Libertas Wien		
- Sturm Graz
1938	Spora Luxemburg		
- RC Strasbourg
1940–1942	FAC		
1942–1943	Sturm Graz		

International career
1928	Austria	1	(0)

Managerial career
- 1938: Spora Luxemburg
- * Club domestic league appearances and goals

Josef Frühwirth (29 May 1907 – January 1944) was an Austrian international footballer.
