= Ferdinand Wesely =

Austrian footballer and coach

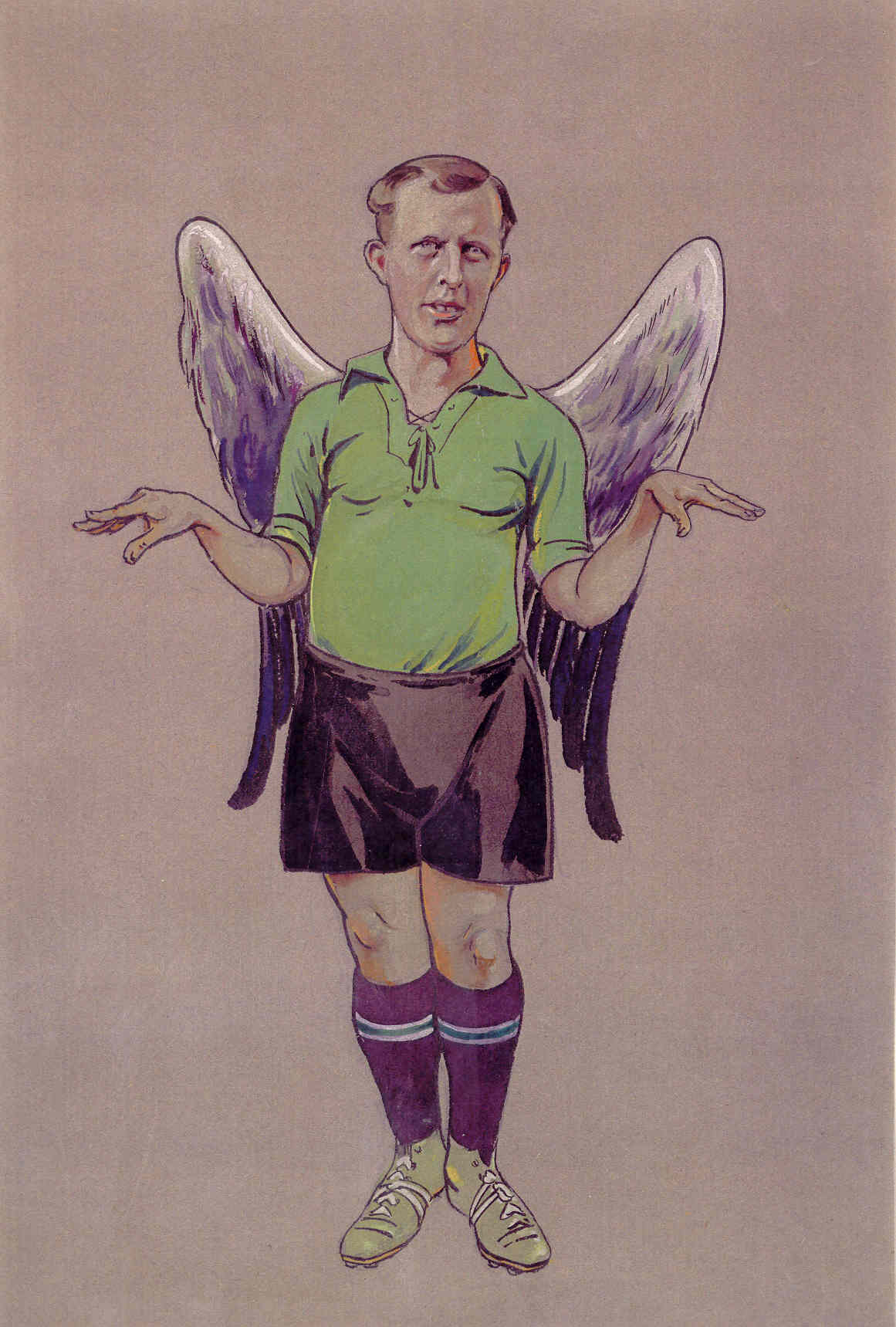
- Ferdinand Wesely, Austrian football player, drawn by Max Leuthe (1879-1945).

Personal information
- Date of birth: 30 May 1897
- Date of death: 19 March 1949 (aged 51)
- Position: Striker

Senior career*
Years	Team	Apps	(Gls)
–1920	Rennweger SV		
1920–1931	SK Rapid Wien	206	(121)
1931–1932	FC St. Gallen		
1932–1934	FC Basel	34	(17)
1934–1936	FC Nordstern Basel		

International career
1922–1930	Austria	40	(17)

Managerial career
- 1935–1936: FC Nordstern Basel
- 1935–1936: FC Concordia Basel
- 1936–1942: K. Beerschot V.A.C.
- * Club domestic league appearances and goals

Ferdinand Wesely (30 May 1897 – 19 March 1949) was an Austrian footballer and coach. He was son of the shoemaker Jakob Wesely (d. 1918) and Antonie. As a first class seaman, he was assigned to the battleship SMS Zrínyi in August 1914 and served on various ships in the Navy throughout the First World War. As of 1929 he was married to the merchant's daughter Martha née Hörmann.

== Club career ==
The left winger began his career at Rennweger SV in 1912 and in 1920 he switched to Rapid, Austria's leading football club at the time. He played 11 years with the club and won Austrian Championship in 1920–21, 1922–23, 1928–29 and 1929–30. He won the Austrian Cup in the season 1926–27 and the Mitropa Cup in 1930. In summer 1931 Wesely moved to Switzerland and joined St. Gallen. During his time in St. Gallen he coached the Lustenau gymnastics association.

Wesely joined FC Basel's first team for their 1932–33 season under head coach Karl Kurz. The two knew each other well from Vienna and had played together in the Austria national team. Two further Austrians were also in the squad, Otto Haftl and Josef Chloupek. After playing in four test games Wesley played his domestic league debut for the club in the home game at the Landhof on 28 August 1932. He also scored his first goal in the same game. In fact he scored a hat-trick as Basel won 6–3 against Etoile Carouge. Wesley scored his next goal in the next match as Basel won 3–2 against La Chaux-de-Fonds. In the return game against LCdF Wesley scored a brace. Basel ended their group stage in second position and so had to play a play-off against the second placed team in the other group, this play-off was lost 4–3. Wesley played in all 14 league matches and in the play-off, scoring nine goals.

In the 1932–33 Swiss Cup Basel advanced 4–2 against Concordia Basel, 3–0 against Blue Stars Zürich, 3–2 against AC Bellinzona, 4–2 against Lugano and in the semi-final 5–3 against Lausanne-Sport to the final. Basel beat Grasshopper Club 4–3 in the final.

Basel started the following season well, winning six of the first nine games, suffering only one defeat. But season was over shadowed by the death of trainer Karl Kurz. Following the death, the team was disorientated, losing five of the next seven matches and thus losing contact with the two top teams. Basel finished the season in fifth position in the table. Wesley played in 19 of the 30 league games.

Wesley then left the club. During his time with the club, Wesley played a total of 71 games for Basel scoring a total of 35 goals. 34 of these games were in the Nationalliga, seven in the Challenge National, nine in the Swiss Cup and 21 were friendly games. He scored 17 goals in the domestic league, two in the Challenge National, six in the cup and the other 10 were scored during the test games.

Wesley moved on to play and work for FC Nordstern Basel as player coach. In 1935 he also worked for FC Concordia Basel as coach. In 1936 Wesely moved to Belgium for a while, where he worked, among other things, as a trainer of Beerschot in Antwerpen. He worked as a physical education teacher in elementary schools. After the end of the Second World War, Wesely returned to Vienna and first joined his club of origin Rennweg and then SC Red Star Penzing, before succumbing to a heart attack on 19 March 1949.

== International career ==
From 1922 Wesley played regularly in the national team under coach Hugo Meisl. In the team, he shone especially in games against arch-rivals Hungary, against whom he scored 8 of his total 17 international goals.

== Honours ==
Rapid Vienna

- Austrian Champion: 1920–21, 1922–23, 1928–29, 1929–30
- Austrian Cup: 1926–27
- Mitropa Cup: 1930

Basel

- Swiss Cup: 1932-33

== Sources ==
- Die ersten 125 Jahre. Publisher: Josef Zindel im Friedrich Reinhardt Verlag, Basel. ISBN 978-3-7245-2305-5
- Verein "Basler Fussballarchiv" Homepage
