= Walter Feigl =

Austrian footballer

Personal information
- Date of birth: 4 January 1906
- Date of death: 8 July 1972 (aged 66)
- Position: Goalkeeper

Senior career*
Years	Team	Apps	(Gls)
1924–1929	Rapid	45	(0)
- * Club domestic league appearances and goals

Walter Feigl (4 January 1906 – 8 July 1972) was an Austrian footballer.
