= Brigittenauer AC =

Former football club

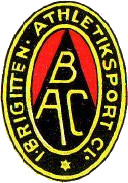
- Full name: 1. Brigittenauer Athletiksport Club
- Short name: Brigittenauer AC BAC
- Sport: Football, Athletics
- Founded: 1925
- First season: 1925
- Disbanded: 2012
- Based in: Vienna
- Stadium: Sportplatz Spielmanngasse
- Colors: Black, Red, Yellow
- Club titles: 1927 Austrian First League runner up 1933 Austrian Cup runner pp 1928 Austrian Cup third place

Brigittenauer Athletiksport Club, commonly referred to as Brigittenauer AC or BAC, was an Austrian football and athletics sport club from Vienna, Austria, its main feat being runners up in the 1933 Austrian Cup and having players such as Karl Adamek and Heinrich Hiltl.

== History ==
=== Founding and glory years ===
Founded on August 27, 1925, Brigittenauer AC started in the second division, getting promoted in their first season. Next year the second season went well for Brigittenauer, and on the last matchday, they were only behind one point to front runner Admira Vienna, who they were playing on the last matchday, however, Admira won the match 5-0, meaning that Brigittenauer AC was only runner up.

=== Relegation and resurgence ===
In the 1928 season, although barely escaping relegation, Brigittenauer surprisingly got to third place in the Austrian Cup, in 1929 the club performed even worse, and was last and got relegated to the second division. But Brigittenauer AC soon found its way back to its old strength for the 1930 season, 126 goals in 26 games only meant second place in the second division, one point behind SK Slovan. In 1931, however, they were without good competition, so they finished the season, this time with 127 goals, and became unbeaten champions of the league.

In the first division, however, they never returned to pre-relegation form. After a good 7th place finish in 1932, in 1933 Brigittenauer went down in last place again. However, the team showed a completely different form in the Austrian Cup. Victories over SC Burgtheater and Gersthof-Währing brought Brigittenauer AC to the quarter-finals where they were set to play SC Hakoah. After 90 minutes it was 1:1, but Brigittenauer AC managed to get 4 goals in ET, bringing the final score to 5-1. Against the Wiener Sport-Club, the semi-finals ended 4-4 and had to be played again. Through a goal in the 85th minute, Brigittenauer won the replay 1-0, and stood in the final against Austria Vienna. A goal from Austria Vienna in the 11th minute gave them the win, depriving Brigittenauer AC from any silverware.

=== Later years ===
After the 1933 season, Brigittenauer AC found stability in the second division until 1938, when the team got relegated to the third division. After this, Brigittenauer AC entered multiple mergers with SCR Hochstädt Wien to form Brigittenauer AC-Hochstädt, and then with SV Helios Brigittenau, and reverted the name back to Brigittenauer AC, changing it to 1. Brigittenauer AC in 1974. In 1983, 1. Brigittenauer AC got relegated to the Vienna City League, the fourth tier, after a few seasons, they merged with SKV Feuerwehr Wien to form Brigittenauer SC Feuerwehr. In 2009, the renamed Brigittenauer AC merged with ISS Admira Landhaus, and the name disappeared (while as of 2008 there is a team called Brigittenauer SC, it is not related to the original club).

== Notable players ==
- Karl Adamek (1927 – 1929, 1931 – 1932)
- Heinrich Hiltl (1925 – 1929)
