= Josef Madlmayer =

Austrian footballer

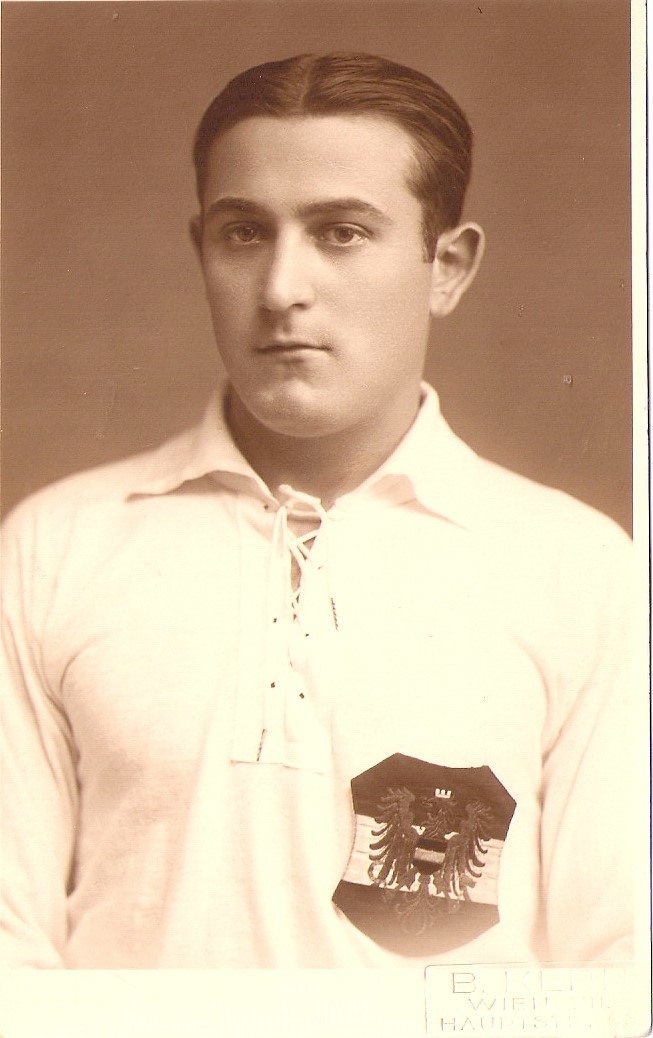
- Josef Madlmayer, 1928

Personal information
- Date of birth: 10 April 1907
- Place of birth: Vienna, Austria
- Date of death: 20 March 1945 (aged 37)
- Place of death: Enkenbach, Germany
- Position: Midfielder

Senior career*
Years	Team	Apps	(Gls)
1925–1930	Rapid	90	(0)
1930–1933	SC Wacker Wien		
1933–1934	Cannes		

International career
1928	Austria	1	(0)
- * Club domestic league appearances and goals

Josef (Franz) Madlmayer (10 April 1907 – 20 March 1945) was an Austrian international footballer.

After his playing years he became a football coach for the Swiss football club FC Frauenfeld in Frauenfeld. In 1939 after the beginning of World War II he returned to Austria. He fell in battle in Enkenbach near Dahn (Germany).
