= Matthias Kaburek =

Austrian footballer

Personal information
- Date of birth: 9 February 1911
- Place of birth: Vienna, Austria-Hungary
- Date of death: 17 February 1976 (aged 65)
- Position: Forward

Senior career*
Years	Team	Apps	(Gls)
1927–1928	Vienna CFC		
1928–1936	Rapid Wien	121	(100)
1936–1937	FC Metz	21	(14)
1937–1938	USB Longwy		
1939–1945	Rapid Wien	37	(38)

International career
1934–1935	Austria	4	(2)
1939	Germany	1	(0)

Managerial career
- 1947: FC Brno
- * Club domestic league appearances and goals

Matthias Kaburek (9 February 1911 – 17 February 1976) was an Austrian football player.

== Club career ==
Born in Vienna, Kaburek played most of his career at local giants Rapid Wien. He also had a spell at French league sides Metz, alongside compatriot and fellow World Cup player Franz Cisar, and Longwy. For Rapid Vienna, Kaburek played 435 games and scored 520 goals.

== International career ==
As a player Kaburek was part of Austria national football team at the 1934 FIFA World Cup. He also played one match for Germany in 1939.

== Honours ==
- Austrian Bundesliga top scorer: 1935
