= Roman Schramseis =

Austrian footballer

Personal information
- Date of birth: 29 March 1906
- Date of death: 10 December 1988 (aged 82)
- Position: Defender

Senior career*
Years	Team	Apps	(Gls)
1922–1925	ASV Hertha Wien		
1925–1932	SK Rapid Wien	115	
1932–1934	FC Rouen		
1934–1935	Wacker Wien		

International career
1928–1932	Austria	18	(0)
- * Club domestic league appearances and goals

Roman Schramseis (29 March 1906 – 10 December 1988) was an Austrian footballer. He was the father of Roman Schramseis, Jr.
