= Willibald Kirbes =

Austrian footballer

Personal information
- Date of birth: 29 June 1902
- Date of death: 3 February 1990 (aged 87)
- Position: Forward

Senior career*
Years	Team	Apps	(Gls)
–1922	Freiheit 14		
1922–1932	Rapid	131	(39)
1932–1938	FC Libertas Wien		

International career
1928	Austria	1	(0)
- * Club domestic league appearances and goals

Willibald Kirbes (29 June 1902 – 3 February 1990) was an Austrian international footballer.
