= Johann Luef =

Austrian footballer (1905–1945)

Personal information
- Date of birth: 21 December 1905
- Date of death: 3 April 1945 (aged 39)
- Position: Forward

Senior career*
Years	Team	Apps	(Gls)
–1926	Baumgartner Sportfreunde		
1926–1937	Rapid Wien	149	(48)
1937–1939	KSV Straßenbahn Wien		
1939–1945	Vorwärts Steyr		

International career
1929–1933	Austria	13	(0)
- * Club domestic league appearances and goals

Johann Luef (21 December 1905 – 3 April 1945) was an Austrian footballer who played as a forward for Rapid Wien. He made 13 appearances for the Austria national team. Luef suffered serious wounding as a soldier in East Prussia, from which died in hospital.
