= Edi Bauer =

Austrian footballer

Personal information
- Date of birth: 13 February 1894
- Place of birth: Vienna, Austria-Hungary
- Date of death: 4 March 1948 (aged 54)
- Position: Striker

Senior career*
Years	Team	Apps	(Gls)
1911–1926	SK Rapid Wien	188	(133)

International career
1912–1921	Austria	23	(13)

Managerial career
- 1926–1936: Rapid Wien
- 1937–1938: Rapid București
- 1938–1939: SV Polizei Hamburg
- 1945–1948: Austria
- * Club domestic league appearances and goals

Eduard "Edi" Bauer (13 February 1894 – 4 March 1948) was an Austrian international footballer and coach.

== Honours ==
=== Player ===
Rapid Wien

- Bundesliga (8): 1911–12, 1912–13, 1915–16, 1916–17, 1918–19, 1919–20, 1920–21, 1922–23
- Austrian Cup (2): 1918–19, 1919–20

Individual

- Bundesliga top scorer (2): 1916–17, 1917–18

=== Manager ===
Rapid Wien

- Bundesliga (3): 1928–29, 1929–30, 1934–35
- Austrian Cup (1): 1926–27

Rapid București

- Cupa României (2): 1936–37, 1937–38
