= Josef Smistik =

Austrian footballer and manager

Personal information
- Date of birth: 28 November 1905
- Place of birth: Vienna, Austria-Hungary
- Date of death: 28 November 1985 (aged 80)
- Position: Defensive midfielder

Youth career
- 1921–1926: ESV Stadlau

Senior career*
Years	Team	Apps	(Gls)
1926–1937	Rapid Wien	201	(20)
1938–1940	ESV Stadlau		
1940–1941	FAC		
1941–1945	Kremser SC		

International career
1928–1936	Austria	39	(2)

Managerial career
- 1952–1956: FC Schaffhausen
- 1958–1959: Austria Wien
- 1964–1965: FC Schaffhausen
- * Club domestic league appearances and goals

Josef Smistik (28 November 1905 – 28 November 1985) was an Austrian football player and manager. Smistik played mainly in midfield as a wing half but could also play as a defender. A very versatile player Smistik was known for his strength, stamina and long balls. He was captain of the famous Austrian Wunderteam at international level.

At club level, he played for Rapid Wien, ESV Stadlau, FAC and Kremser SC.

He later coached FC Schaffhausen and Austria Wien.
