= Pfarrwiese =

Austrian stadium (1912–1977)

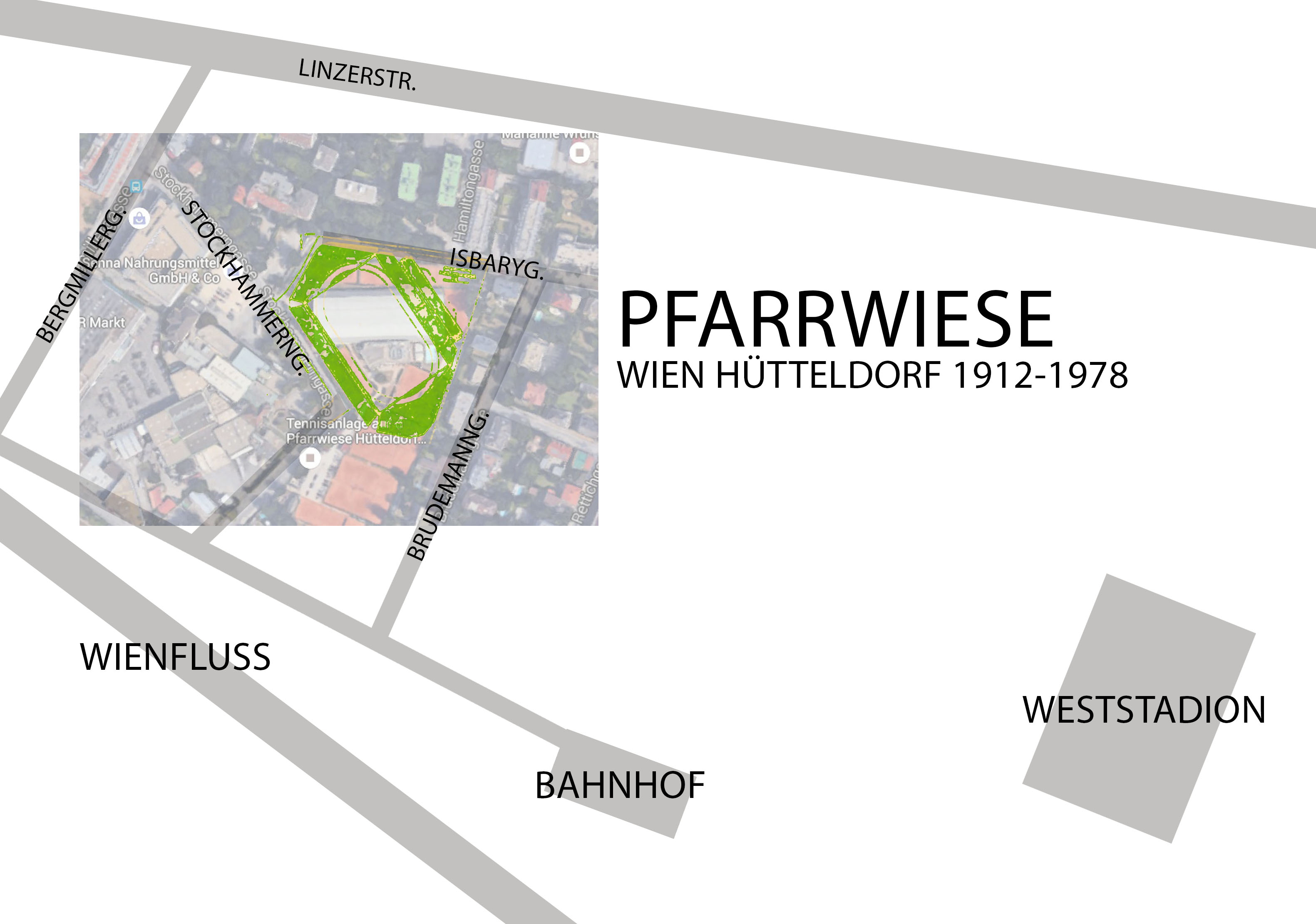

Pfarrwiese was a multi-use stadium in Vienna, Austria. It was used mostly for football matches and hosted the home matches of SK Rapid Wien. The stadium was able to hold 25,000 spectators at its height and originally opened in 1912. It was closed in 1977, being replaced by Gerhard Hanappi Stadium.
