= Franz Weselik =

Austrian footballer and manager

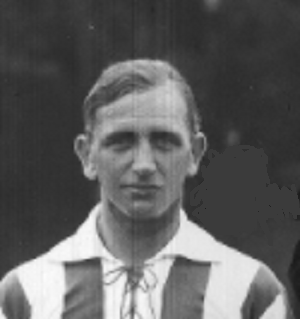
- Franz Weselik in 1932

Personal information
- Date of birth: 20 April 1903
- Date of death: 15 March 1962 (aged 58)
- Position: Forward

Senior career*
Years	Team	Apps	(Gls)
1919–1923	Blue Star Wien		
1923–1934	SK Rapid Wien	175	(160)
1934–1937	FC Mulhouse	60	(36)
1937–1938	Jönköpings Södra IF		
1938	SC Red Star Wien		

International career
1928–1933	Austria	11	(13)

Managerial career
- 1934–1935: FC Mulhouse
- 1937–1938: Jönköpings Södra IF
- * Club domestic league appearances and goals

Franz Weselik (20 April 1903 – 15 March 1962) was a former Austrian football player. He made his debut for Austria in May 1928 against Hungary and earned 11 caps, scoring 13 goals. His final international was an April 1933 match, also against Hungary.

== Honours ==
- Austrian Football Bundesliga (2):
  - 1929, 1930
- Austrian Cup (1):
  - 1927
- Mitropa Cup (1):
  - 1930
