= Leopold Czejka =

Austrian footballer

Personal information
- Date of birth: 14 November 1903
- Position: Defender

Senior career*
Years	Team	Apps	(Gls)
–1925	Germania Schwechat		
1925–1937	SK Rapid Wien	124	(0)
1937–	FC Wien		

International career
1930–1931	Austria	2	(0)
- * Club domestic league appearances and goals

Leopold Czejka (born 14 November 1903, date of death unknown) was an Austrian international footballer.
