= SK Slovan HAC =

- Full name: Sportklub Slovan Hütteldorfer Athletikclub Wien
- Founded: 11 January 1902; 124 years ago
- Ground: Slovanplatz Hütteldorf, Hütteldorf, Vienna
- Capacity: 1,500
- League: Wiener Stadtliga
- 2020–21: Wiener Stadtliga, 15th (season abandoned)
Home colours	Away colours

Sportklub Slovan Hütteldorfer Athletikclub Wien, better known as SK Slovan HAC, is an Austrian football club located in Hütteldorf, Vienna, Austria.

== History ==
Sk Slovan HAC was founded on 11 January 1902 as Sportovni Klub Slovan ve Vídni - better known as SK Slovan - by the Czech minority in Vienna. They were promoted to the Austrian First Division in 1923, and built a new stadium - the České srdce (now known as the Generali Arena). The stadium was so large that it caused the club financial problems.

The club was relegated in 1928/29 season, but was in the first division again in 1930. They again achieved promotion to the first division in 1949/50 as AC Sparta. In 1960, the club merged with ÖMV Olympia 33 and the club was known as SK Slovan-Olympia. In 1976, they merged with Hütteldorfer AC founded in 1911, and was thereafter known as SK Slovan-Hütteldorfer AC. They have mostly played in the Wiener Stadtliga since the 1980s and 90s.

== Colours and badge ==
The club's original colours were green and red. Nowadays, their colours are blue, white, and red.

== Honours and achievements ==
- Austrian Cup
  - 1x finalists: 1923/24
- Austrian Bundesliga
  - 1x 6th place: 1925/26
  - 9x Participation: 1924–1929, 1931–1932, 1950
- Austrian 2 Liga
  - 4x champions: 1922/23, 1929/30, 1934/35, 1948/49
  - 2x runners-up: 1944/45, 1945/46
  - 2x third place: 1921/22, 1932/33
- Austrian Regionalliga East
  - 1x champions: 1988
  - 1x runners-up: 1978/79
