= Hohe Warte Stadium =

Stadium in Vienna, Austria

Coordinates: 48°14′58″N 16°21′28″E

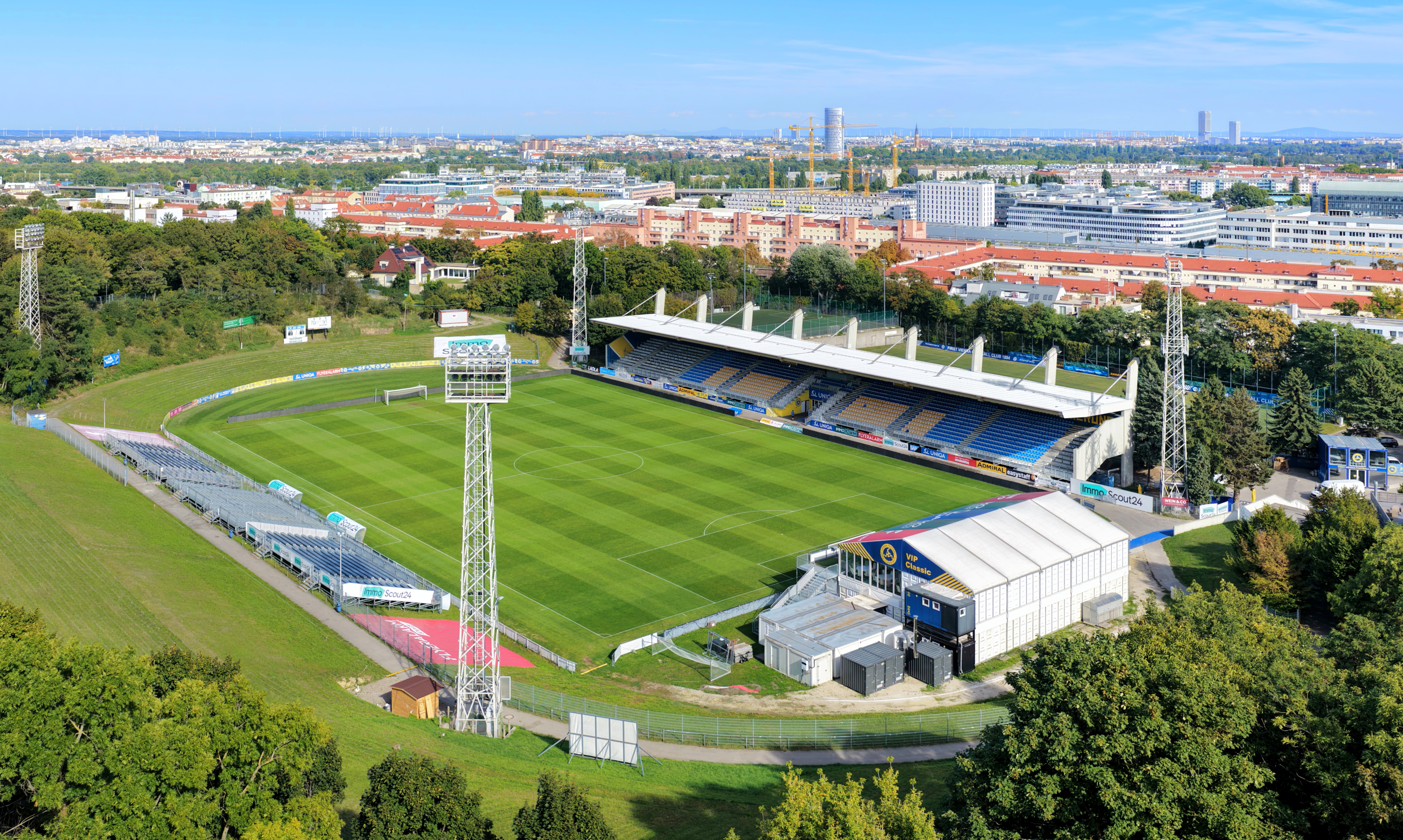
- Panoramic view of the stadium
- Interactive map of Hohe Warte Stadium
- Location: Heiligenstadt, Döbling, Vienna, Austria
- Owner: City of Vienna
- Capacity: 4,238 (formerly 85,000)
- Surface: Grass
- Field size: 100m x 64m

Construction
- Opened: 19 June 1921
- Renovated: 2006
- Architect: Eduard Schönecker

Tenants
- First Vienna FC (1921–present); First Vienna FC (women); Vienna Vikings (1993–2015, 2017–2021); Austria national rugby union team (sporadic, 1992–2016); Austria national football team (1920–1939)

Hohe Warte Stadium is a multi-purpose stadium in Vienna, Austria. It is located on the Hohe Warte hill in Heiligenstadt, a northern suburb in the 19th Viennese district of Döbling. Primarily a football venue and the home of First Vienna FC, it has also occasionally played host to Austrian international rugby union matches and the Vienna Vikings American football team.

== History ==
The stadium was opened in 1921 and was contemporaneously considered the best and biggest sporting venue in continental Europe. The Austrian national football side played numerous matches there in the 1920s and 1930s, attracting the ground's record attendance of 85,000 people when playing Italy in 1923. Around this time the venue also hosted boxing bouts like Georges Carpentier versus Arthur Townley on 1 May 1924 and even open-air opera performances like on 24 July 1924 when an audience of 20,000 attended Aida conducted by Pietro Mascagni. It was also occasionally used as a giant Movie Theater in the years immediately following the Second World War.

Hohe Warte lost its status as Austria's leading stadium with the construction of the Praterstadion (present-day Ernst-Happel-Stadion) in 1931, however, First Vienna's championship success in the 1940s and 1950s ensured that crowds remained high.

== Description ==
The stadium is constructed into the side of a hill, creating a natural amphitheatre. Adding to the natural feel is the fact that three of the four sides of the ground boast grass banking, as opposed to the more traditional concrete, giving the ground an overwhelmingly green appearance (similar to The Valley in its early days). The fourth side of the ground features a modern main stand and is currently the only part of the stadium in use, following a council directive forbidding the use of the grass banking on safety grounds. As a result, the stadium's capacity since the 2005–06 season has been only 5,500. However, this does not stop more people peering into the ground.
