= 1955–56 SK Rapid Wien season =

Rapid Wien
1955–56 season
- Coaches: Franz Wagner, Alois Beranek
- Stadium: Pfarrwiese, Vienna, Austria
- Staatsliga A: Champions (20th title)
- European Cup: Quarterfinals
- Mitropa Cup: Runner-up
- Top goalscorer: League: Gerhard Hanappi (25); All: Gerhard Hanappi (30)
- Average home league attendance: 9,000

The 1955–56 SK Rapid Wien season was the 58th season in club history.

== Squad ==
=== Squad statistics ===
Nat.	Name	Age	League		European Cup		Mitropa Cup		Total	
Nat.	Name	Age	Apps	Goals	Apps	Goals	Apps	Goals	Apps	Goals
Goalkeepers
(Austria)	Herbert Gartner	22	23		3		7		33	
(Austria)	Dieter Pflug	21	1						1	
(Austria)	Walter Zeman	28	2		1				3	
Defenders
(Austria)	Lothar Bilek	22	3		1				4	
(Austria)	Franz Golobic	33	20		2	1	7		29	1
(Austria)	Josef Höltl	18	21		4		7		32	
(Austria)	Robert Kaffka	25	16		3				19	
Midfielders
(Austria)	Karl Giesser	26	17		2		6		25	
(Austria)	Lambert Lenzinger	19	15		2		2		19	
Forwards
(Austria)	Josef Bertalan	20	23	7			7	1	30	8
(Austria)	Robert Dienst	27	26	17	3	1	5		34	18
(Austria)	Paul Halla	24	26	1	4		7		37	1
(Austria)	Gerhard Hanappi	26	25	25	4	1	7	4	36	30
(Austria)	Alfred Körner	29	21	15	3	3	6	5	30	23
(Austria)	Robert Körner	30	6	1	2	1	7	3	15	5
(Austria)	Bruno Mehsarosch	21	7	5	2	1	4	2	13	8
(Socialist Federal Republic of Yugoslavia)	Milan Nikolić	26	3						3	
(Austria)	Erich Probst	27	11	7	4	1			15	8
(Austria)	Johann Riegler	25	20	15	4		5	2	29	17

== Fixtures and results ==
Win Draw Loss

=== League ===
Rd	Date	Venue	Opponent	Res.	Att.	Goals and discipline
1	28.08.1955	H	Simmering	4-2	11,000	Dienst 26', Hanappi 29' 65', Probst E. 37'
2	03.09.1955	A	Wiener SC	2-2	14,500	Probst E. 55' 60'
3	11.09.1955	A	Wacker Wien	3-3	45,000	Körner A. 40', Dienst 51' (pen.) 57'
4	18.09.1955	A	Kapfenberg	1-0	7,500	Körner A. 15'
5	25.09.1955	H	Austria Salzburg	5-2	9,000	Mehsarosch 10' 64', Dienst 42' 89', Körner A. 81'
6	02.10.1955	A	Vienna	1-4	32,000	Probst E. 88'
7	08.10.1955	H	Stadlau	4-0	6,000	Hanappi 17' 84', Mehsarosch 25', Dienst 74'
8	23.10.1955	A	Austria Wien	3-1	35,000	Dienst 16', Körner A. 43', Mehsarosch 82'
9	06.11.1955	H	FC Wien	2-1	8,000	Körner A. 50', Riegler 60'
10	13.11.1955	A	Admira	5-3	7,000	Riegler 15' 20', Dienst 45' 67', Bertalan 90'
11	26.11.1955	H	Sturm Graz	7-1	3,000	Dienst 15' 28' 30' 45', Körner A. 41', Riegler 70', Bertalan 84'
12	04.12.1955	H	GAK	5-1	7,000	Dienst 7' 27', Körner A. 30', Probst E. 47', Bertalan 60'
13	10.12.1955	A	Austria Graz	1-0	5,000	Körner A. 28' (pen.)
14	07.03.1956	A	Simmering	4-1	5,000	Dienst 13', Probst E. 55', Hanappi 63', Riegler 87'
15	18.04.1956	H	Wiener SC	6-0	4,000	Körner A. 6' (pen.) 60', Hanappi 15', Riegler 17' 41' 55'
16	11.03.1956	H	Wacker Wien	0-2	15,000	
17	18.03.1956	H	Kapfenberg	6-0	12,000	Hanappi 16' 63' 83' 90', Probst E. 27', Dienst 70'
18	08.04.1956	A	Austria Salzburg	4-0	10,000	Riegler 43', Bertalan 60', Hanappi 65' 67'
19	22.04.1956	H	Vienna	1-5	15,000	Riegler 25'
20	06.05.1956	A	Stadlau	2-1	5,000	Hanappi 7' 45'
21	10.05.1956	H	Austria Wien	5-3	15,000	Hanappi 41', Körner A.
22	12.05.1956	A	FC Wien	2-2	6,000	Hanappi 55', Mehsarosch 86'
23	27.05.1956	H	Admira	4-0	6,000	Hanappi 15' 22' 30' (pen.), Riegler 46'
24	31.05.1956	A	Sturm Graz	3-2	5,000	Riegler, Körner A.
25	03.06.1956	A	GAK	6-1	6,000	Hanappi 18' 27' 88', Bertalan 72' 80', Riegler 89'
26	09.06.1956	H	Austria Graz	7-0	7,000	Riegler 27', Halla 30', Körner A. 40', Bertalan 53', Hanappi 61' 85', Körner R. 89'

=== European Cup ===
Rd	Date	Venue	Opponent	Res.	Att.	Goals and discipline
R16-L1	21.09.1955	H	PSV (Netherlands)	6-1	12,000	Körner A. 10' 62' 81', Mehsarosch 55', Hanappi 56', Probst E. 60'
R16-L2	01.11.1955	A	PSV (Netherlands)	0-1	15,000	
QF-L1	18.01.1956	H	Milan (Italy)	1-1	20,000	Körner R. 26' (pen.)
QF-L2	12.02.1956	A	Milan (Italy)	2-7	20,000	Golobic 35', Dienst 59'

=== Mitropa Cup ===
Rd	Date	Venue	Opponent	Res.	Att.	Goals and discipline
QF-L1	23.06.1956	H	Slovan Bratislava (Czechoslovakia)	3-0	20,000	Körner R. 65' 67', Hanappi 72'
QF-L2	30.06.1956	A	Slovan Bratislava (Czechoslovakia)	1-3	55,000	Hanappi 82'
SF-L1	07.07.1956	H	Vörös Lobogó (Hungary)	3-3	45,000	Körner A. 12' 60', Körner R. 46' (pen.)
SF-L2	14.07.1956	A	Vörös Lobogó (Hungary)	4-3	80,000	Hanappi 10' 17', Körner A. 20', Mehsarosch 83'
F-L1	21.07.1956	H	Vasas (Hungary)	3-3	55,000	Körner A. 3' 14', Mehsarosch 19'
F-L2	28.07.1956	A	Vasas (Hungary)	1-1	104,000	Bertalan 60'
F-PO	04.08.1956	A	Vasas (Hungary)	2-9	104,000	Riegler 32' 85'
