= 1950–51 SK Rapid Wien season =

Rapid Wien
1950–51 season
- Coach: Hans Pesser
- Stadium: Pfarrwiese, Vienna, Austria
- Staatsliga A: Champions (17th title)
- Zentropa Cup: Winner (2nd title)
- Top goalscorer: League: Robert Dienst (37); All: Robert Dienst (37)
- Average home league attendance: 22,300

The 1950–51 SK Rapid Wien season was the 53rd season in club history.

== Squad ==
=== Squad statistics ===
Nat.	Name	Age	League		Zentropa Cup		Total	
Nat.	Name	Age	Apps	Goals	Apps	Goals	Apps	Goals
Goalkeepers
(Austria)	Josef Musil	29	9		1		10	
(Austria)	Walter Zeman	23	15		1		16	
Defenders
(Austria)	Ernst Happel	24	24	1	2	1	26	2
(Austria)	Max Merkel	31	24	1	2		26	1
Midfielders
(Austria)	Leopold Gernhardt	30	23	10	2	1	25	11
(Austria)	Karl Giesser	21	1				1	
(Austria)	Franz Golobic	28	22	2			22	2
(Austria)	Gerhard Hanappi	21	11	2	2	1	13	3
(Austria)	Karl Jestrab	19	3				3	
(Austria)	Erich Müller	22	15		2		17	
Forwards
(Austria)	Robert Dienst	22	23	37			23	37
(Austria)	Alfred Körner	24	21	14	2	1	23	15
(Austria)	Robert Körner	25	21	17	2		23	17
(Austria)	Erich Probst	22	23	28	2	4	25	32
(Austria)	Johann Riegler	20	24	12	2		26	12
(Austria)	Alfred Teinitzer	20	5	5	2		7	5

== Fixtures and results ==
Win Draw Loss

=== League ===
Rd	Date	Venue	Opponent	Res.	Att.	Goals and discipline
1	26.08.1950	H	LASK	11-2	9,000	Teinitzer, Riegler, Körner R., Golobic, Gernhardt, Dienst
2	30.08.1950	A	Elektra Wien	5-1	18,000	Probst E., Dienst
4	10.09.1950	H	Wiener SC	2-2	35,000	Riegler, Dienst
5	17.09.1950	A	Austria Wien	7-5	55,000	Gernhardt 10' 12', Körner A. 20', Dienst 47' 64', Körner R. 60' 75'
6	24.09.1950	H	Sturm Graz	12-1	13,000	Riegler, Probst E., Körner R., Körner A., Golobic, Gernhardt, Dienst
7	01.10.1950	A	Vienna	9-0	22,000	Probst E., Körner A., Dienst, Fischer (o.g.)
8	15.10.1950	H	Steyr	5-1	18,000	Riegler, Merkel, Körner R., Körner A.
9	21.10.1950	A	Wacker Wien	4-3	33,000	Riegler, Probst E., Dienst
10	12.11.1950	H	FC Wien	8-0	18,000	Riegler, Probst E., Körner R., Körner A., Dienst
11	19.11.1950	A	Admira	1-0	34,000	Dienst
12	26.11.1950	H	FAC	5-2	15,000	Körner A., Dienst, Unknown (o.g.)
13	03.12.1950	A	Wiener Neustadt	5-2	9,000	Teinitzer, Körner A., Dienst
14	25.02.1951	A	LASK	1-2	15,000	Probst E.
15	04.03.1951	A	Elektra Wien	11-0	8,000	Teinitzer, Riegler, Körner R., Gernhardt, Dienst, Weinberg (o.g.)
17	18.02.1951	H	Wiener SC	6-3	21,000	Probst E., Dienst
18	01.04.1951	H	Austria Wien	3-1	60,000	Probst E., Happel (pen.), Dienst
19	08.04.1951	A	Sturm Graz	3-3	12,000	Riegler, Körner R. (pen.), Gernhardt
20	22.04.1951	H	Vienna	5-2	16,000	Riegler, Probst E., Körner R., Hanappi, Gernhardt
21	29.04.1951	A	Steyr	6-1	8,000	Probst E., Körner A., Hanappi, Dienst
22	15.04.1951	H	Wacker Wien	3-3	45,000	Probst E., Körner R., Dienst
23	03.05.1951	A	FC Wien	3-2	6,000	Probst E., Körner R., Dienst
24	25.04.1951	H	Admira	3-1	10,000	Probst E., Körner A.
25	03.06.1951	A	FAC	8-2	7,000	Riegler, Probst E., Körner R., Körner A., Dienst
26	10.06.1951	H	Wiener Neustadt	7-1	7,000	Probst E., Dienst, Mittasch (o.g.)

=== Zentropa Cup ===
Rd	Date	Venue	Opponent	Res.	Att.	Goals and discipline
SF	03.07.1951	H	Lazio (Italy)	5-0	23,000	Probst E. 15' 51' 62', Körner A. 43', Hanappi 72'
F	05.07.1951	N	Wacker Wien (Austria)	3-2	9,000	Gernhardt 40', Probst E. 58', Happel 90' (pen.)
