= 1952–53 SK Rapid Wien season =

Rapid Wien
1952–53 season
- Coaches: Hans Pesser, Josef Uridil
- Stadium: Pfarrwiese, Vienna, Austria
- Staatsliga A: 3rd
- Top goalscorer: Robert Dienst (29)
- Average home league attendance: 20,000

The 1952–53 SK Rapid Wien season was the 55th season in club history.

== Squad ==
=== Squad statistics ===
Nat.	Name	Age	League	
Nat.	Name	Age	Apps	Goals
Goalkeepers
(Austria)	Josef Musil	31	3	
(Austria)	Dieter Pflug	18	5	
(Austria)	Walter Zeman	25	18	
Defenders
(Austria)	Ernst Happel	26	24	2
(Austria)	Max Merkel	33	25	
Midfielders
(Austria)	Leopold Gernhardt	32	15	3
(Austria)	Karl Giesser	23	13	1
(Austria)	Franz Golobic	30	26	
(Austria)	Robert Kaffka	22	12	
(Austria)	Erich Müller	24	5	
Forwards
(Austria)	Josef Bertalan	17	3	
(Austria)	Robert Dienst	24	25	29
(Austria)	Leopold Eineder	19	3	
(Austria)	Gerhard Hanappi	23	26	14
(Austria)	Alfred Körner	26	16	7
(Austria)	Robert Körner	27	12	1
(Austria)	Bruno Mehsarosch	18	1	1
(Austria)	Erich Probst	24	23	20
(Austria)	Johann Riegler	22	26	14
(Austria)	Alfred Vuga	17	5	2

== Fixtures and results ==
Win Draw Loss

=== League ===
Rd	Date	Venue	Opponent	Res.	Att.	Goals and discipline
1	24.08.1952	H	Grazer SC	6-2	12,000	Vuga 6', Riegler 30', Dienst 52' 64', Happel 64' (pen.), Probst E. 67'
2	31.08.1952	A	SAK 1914	4-3	6,000	Gernhardt 9', Körner A. 18', Dienst 61' 68'
3	06.09.1952	H	VfB Mödling	3-2	18,000	Riegler, Gernhardt
4	14.09.1952	A	GAK	1-1	8,000	Happel 87'
5	27.09.1952	H	LASK	9-0	15,000	Probst E. 8' 44' 60', Dienst 23' 50' 80' 88', Körner A. 52', Vuga 61'
6	05.10.1952	A	Vienna	4-2	40,000	Gernhardt 8', Körner A. 28' (pen.), Probst E. 68' 87'
7	12.10.1952	H	FC Wien	3-1	17,000	Riegler 2' 22' 56'
8	26.10.1952	A	Austria Wien	1-2	24,000	Probst E. 62'
9	02.11.1952	H	Admira	2-1	20,000	Riegler 47', Probst E. 58'
10	09.11.1952	H	Sturm Graz	2-0	7,000	Dienst 50', Probst E. 61'
11	16.11.1952	A	FAC	4-1	22,000	Dienst 42', Hanappi 46', Riegler 53', Probst E. 83'
12	30.11.1952	H	Wacker Wien	3-2	30,000	Probst E., Dienst
13	07.12.1952	A	Simmering	0-2	6,000	
14	01.03.1953	A	Grazer SC	0-1	8,000	
15	08.03.1953	H	SAK 1914	5-3	3,500	Dienst 7', Hanappi 11', Riegler 21' 39', Probst E. 71'
16	15.03.1953	A	VfB Mödling	5-2	4,000	Hanappi 6', Giesser 8', Dienst 42' 54', Riegler 75'
17	28.03.1953	H	GAK	5-1	7,000	Riegler, Hanappi, Dienst
18	12.04.1953	A	LASK	3-0	17,000	Riegler 26', Hanappi 43' 50'
19	19.04.1953	H	Vienna	2-4	45,000	Körner A., Hanappi
20	03.05.1953	A	FC Wien	5-1	15,000	Mehsarosch 30', Dienst 47' 77' 80', Hanappi 58'
21	10.05.1953	H	Austria Wien	4-1	35,000	Probst E. 48' 66', Hanappi 50', Dienst 77'
22	17.05.1953	A	Admira	1-3	25,000	Probst E. 75'
23	31.05.1953	A	Sturm Graz	3-3	8,000	Probst E., Dienst
24	07.06.1953	H	FAC	12-4	45,000	Dienst 4' 6' 24' 40', Probst E. 14' 69', Hanappi 44' 53' 75', Körner R. 55', Körner A. 56' 57'
25	14.06.1953	A	Wacker Wien	3-3	25,000	Dienst 46' 58', Probst E. 55'
26	21.06.1953	H	Simmering	4-3	6,000	Körner A., Hanappi, Dienst (pen.)
