= 1953–54 SK Rapid Wien season =

Rapid Wien
1953–54 season
- Coach: Josef Uridil
- Stadium: Pfarrwiese, Vienna, Austria
- Staatsliga A: Champions (19th title)
- Top goalscorer: Robert Dienst (25)
- Average home league attendance: 13,600

The 1953–54 SK Rapid Wien season was the 56th season in club history.

== Squad ==
=== Squad statistics ===
Nat.	Name	Age	League	
Nat.	Name	Age	Apps	Goals
Goalkeepers
(Austria)	Dieter Pflug	19	5	
(Austria)	Walter Zeman	26	21	
Defenders
(Austria)	Ernst Happel	27	21	3
(Austria)	Robert Kaffka	23	8	
(Austria)	Max Merkel	34	12	
Midfielders
(Austria)	Leopold Gernhardt	33	15	
(Austria)	Karl Giesser	24	20	2
(Austria)	Franz Golobic	31	24	
(Austria)	Johann Riegler	23	25	2
Forwards
(Austria)	Robert Dienst	25	26	25
(Austria)	Leopold Eineder	20	1	
(Austria)	Paul Halla	22	22	7
(Austria)	Gerhard Hanappi	24	24	21
(Austria)	Alfred Körner	27	19	5
(Austria)	Robert Körner	28	17	8
(Austria)	Bruno Mehsarosch	19	5	5
(Austria)	Erich Probst	25	21	16

== Fixtures and results ==
Win Draw Loss

=== League ===
Rd	Date	Venue	Opponent	Res.	Att.	Goals and discipline
1	23.08.1953	A	GAK	3-1	8,000	Dienst 13' 49', Halla 20'
2	26.08.1953	H	Admira	3-2	16,000	Körner A. 7', Dienst 55', Hanappi 75'
3	30.08.1953	A	Austria Salzburg	3-1	10,000	Hanappi 8', Probst E. 43' 57'
4	02.09.1953	A	FAC	7-0	5,000	Hanappi 16' 22' 52', Dienst 57', Probst E. 50', Halla 70'
5	06.09.1953	A	Austria Wien	3-4	60,000	Probst E. 10', Körner R. 70' (pen.), Hanappi 88'
6	13.09.1953	A	FC Wien	3-0	6,000	Hanappi 1', Dienst 44' 86'
7	15.09.1953	H	LASK	8-0	8,000	Probst E., Körner R., Körner A., Giesser, Dienst, Teinitzer (o.g.)
8	20.09.1953	A	Sturm Graz	4-2	8,000	Probst E. 15' 60', Körner R. 47' (pen.), Hanappi 73'
9	03.10.1953	A	Wiener SC	1-1	12,000	Dienst 55'
10	15.12.1953	H	Simmering	2-2	2,500	Dienst 35', Happel 40' (pen.)
11	25.10.1953	A	Wiener AC	2-1	10,000	Probst E. 7', Dienst 61'
12	31.10.1953	H	Wacker Wien	2-2	20,000	Happel 19', Mehsarosch 51'
13	08.11.1953	H	Vienna	4-3	20,000	Dienst 44' 80', Happel 54' (pen.), Probst E. 67'
14	15.11.1953	H	GAK	4-1	15,000	Dienst 17', Hanappi 35' 67', Körner A. 53'
15	06.12.1953	A	Admira	1-1	7,500	Mehsarosch 33'
16	13.12.1953	H	Austria Salzburg	5-1	6,500	Dienst 65', Probst E. 80', Mehsarosch 82' 84' 87'
17	28.02.1954	H	FAC	4-2	11,000	Dienst 4' 6', Probst E. 33' 44'
18	07.03.1954	H	Austria Wien	3-0	50,000	Giesser 7', Halla 33', Hanappi 89'
19	14.03.1954	H	FC Wien	7-2	8,000	Dienst 7' 21' 44' 56', Körner R. 30', Hanappi 40' 48'
20	21.03.1954	A	LASK	5-0	16,000	Kralovic 33' (o.g.), Probst E. 48' 57', Hanappi 52', Riegler 80'
21	23.03.1954	H	Sturm Graz	6-4	4,000	Hanappi 3' 39' 64', Dienst 35', Riegler 49', Halla 74'
22	28.03.1954	A	Vienna	2-2	30,000	Dienst 34' 54'
23	04.04.1954	H	Wiener SC	2-3	9,000	Körner R. 19', Hanappi 84'
24	24.04.1954	A	Wacker Wien	5-1	16,000	Dienst 50', Hanappi 53', Halla 68' 70', Körner A. 89'
25	02.05.1954	H	Wiener AC	4-5	6,000	Halla 4', Körner A. 35', Körner R. 36' (pen.), Probst E. 89'
26	16.05.1954	A	Simmering	3-2	7,000	Probst E. 19', Hanappi 58' 75'
