= 1957–58 SK Rapid Wien season =

Rapid Wien
1957–58 season
- Coach: Max Merkel
- Stadium: Pfarrwiese, Vienna, Austria
- Staatsliga A: 2nd
- European Cup: 1st round
- Top goalscorer: League: Robert Dienst (30); All: Robert Dienst (32)
- Average home league attendance: 11,300

The 1957–58 SK Rapid Wien season was the 60th season in club history.

== Squad ==
=== Squad statistics ===
Nat.	Name	Age	League		European Cup		Total	
Nat.	Name	Age	Apps	Goals	Apps	Goals	Apps	Goals
Goalkeepers
(Austria)	Herbert Gartner	24	7		2		9	
(Austria)	Walter Zeman	30	19		1		20	
Defenders
(Austria)	Franz Golobic	35	16		1		17	
(Austria)	Paul Halla	26	26	5	3		29	5
(Austria)	Ernst Happel	31	26	7	2	1	28	8
(Austria)	Lambert Lenzinger	21	3		3		6	
(Austria)	Wilhelm Zaglitsch	20	8				8	
Midfielders
(Austria)	Lothar Bilek	24	8		3		11	
(Austria)	Karl Giesser	28	19	1	1		20	1
(Austria)	Gerhard Hanappi	28	26	4	2	1	28	5
Forwards
(Austria)	Josef Bertalan	22	25	11	3	2	28	13
(Austria)	Robert Dienst	29	24	30	3	2	27	32
(Austria)	Helmut Geyer	18	6	1			6	1
(Austria)	Josef Höltl	20	19	1	2		21	1
(Austria)	Alfred Körner	31	23	10	3	1	26	11
(Austria)	Robert Körner	32			1		1	
(Austria)	Bruno Mehsarosch	23	4	3			4	3
(Austria)	Karl Osicka	18	3				3	
(Austria)	Johann Riegler	27	23	18	3	1	26	19
(Austria)	Herbert Schaffranek	19	1				1	

== Fixtures and results ==
Win Draw Loss

=== League ===
Rd	Date	Venue	Opponent	Res.	Att.	Goals and discipline
1	24.08.1957	H	Vienna	4-1	25,000	Dienst 30' 47', Halla 72', Riegler 80'
2	28.08.1957	A	Olympia Vienna	6-4	6,000	Dienst 6' 46' 85', Körner A. 30', Riegler 36' 40'
3	31.08.1957	H	Kapfenberg	8-2	7,000	Halla 14' 67', Riegler 19', Dienst 21' 49' 55' 64' (pen.) 72'
4	04.09.1957	A	Wacker Wien	1-2	20,000	Körner A. 25'
5	08.09.1957	H	FC Wien	5-1	5,000	Riegler 15' 55' 64', Dienst 75' (pen.) 86'
6	23.10.1957	A	Simmering	5-2	6,000	Dienst 6' 16' 50' 75', Bertalan 60'
7	19.10.1957	H	Wiener AC	3-1	7,000	Hanappi 8', Happel 14' (pen.), Bertalan 48'
8	27.10.1957	A	Admira	1-3	9,000	Dienst 40'
9	03.11.1957	H	GAK	1-4	6,000	Körner A. 12'
10	10.11.1957	H	Austria Wien	4-0	30,000	Happel 3' (pen.), Bertalan 5' 75', Geyer
11	17.11.1957	A	Sturm Graz	2-1	3,000	Mehsarosch 25' 84'
12	24.11.1957	H	Kremser SC	2-0	6,000	Bertalan 44', Happel 65' (pen.)
13	30.11.1957	A	Wiener SC	4-2	13,000	Bertalan 30' 72', Dienst 53', Körner A. 65'
14	07.12.1957	A	Vienna	2-1	9,000	Riegler 2', Happel 59' (pen.)
15	23.02.1958	H	Olympia Vienna	2-1	10,000	Höltl 34', Bertalan 42'
16	23.03.1958	A	Kapfenberg	1-0	6,000	Mehsarosch 51'
17	08.03.1958	H	Wacker Wien	5-5	10,000	Riegler 7' 9' 28' 70' 88'
18	07.05.1958	A	FC Wien	5-0	15,000	Unknown 50' (o.g.), Dienst 55' 60' 73', Hanappi 70'
19	29.03.1958	H	Simmering	5-2	8,000	Körner A. 5' (pen.), Dienst 7' 80' (pen.), Riegler 19', Giesser 55'
20	12.04.1958	A	Wiener AC	3-0	6,000	Happel 28', Bertalan 72', Riegler 83'
21	16.04.1958	H	Admira	7-2	12,000	Dienst 13' 75', Happel 29', Unknown (o.g.), Riegler 63', Körner A. 67' 80'
22	20.04.1958	A	GAK	3-2	10,000	Hanappi 25' 63', Körner A. 65'
23	27.04.1958	A	Austria Wien	1-1	5,500	Körner A. 5'
24	30.04.1958	H	Sturm Graz	10-0	9,000	Riegler 4' 58', Bertalan 13' 86', Dienst 20' 37' 65' 71', Halla 76' 87'
25	04.05.1958	A	Kremser SC	1-0	8,000	Dienst 25'
26	10.05.1958	H	Wiener SC	2-2	12,000	Happel 17', Körner A. 80'

=== European Cup ===
Rd	Date	Venue	Opponent	Res.	Att.	Goals and discipline
QR	02.10.1957	A	Milan (Italy)	1-4	50,000	Dienst 58'
QR-L1	09.10.1957	H	Milan (Italy)	5-2	25,000	Körner A. 1', Dienst 31', Bertalan 58', Riegler 72', Hanappi 80'
QR-L2	30.10.1957	N	Milan (Italy)	2-4	24,000	Happel 37', Bertalan 73'
