= 1956–57 SK Rapid Wien season =

Rapid Wien
1956–57 season
- Coach: Max Merkel
- Stadium: Pfarrwiese, Vienna, Austria
- Staatsliga A: Champions (21st title)
- European Cup: Round of 16
- Mitropa Cup: Semifinals
- Top goalscorer: League: Robert Dienst (32); All: Robert Dienst (33)
- Average home league attendance: 11,400

The 1956–57 SK Rapid Wien season was the 59th season in club history.

== Squad ==
=== Squad statistics ===
Nat.	Name	Age	League		European Cup		Mitropa Cup		Total	
Nat.	Name	Age	Apps	Goals	Apps	Goals	Apps	Goals	Apps	Goals
Goalkeepers
(Austria)	Herbert Gartner	23	9		1		5		15	
(Austria)	Walter Zeman	29	17		2				19	
Defenders
(Austria)	Franz Golobic	34	26	2	3		5		34	2
(Austria)	Ernst Happel	30	18	3	3	3	5	1	26	7
(Austria)	Wilhelm Zaglitsch	19	11						11	
Midfielders
(Austria)	Lothar Bilek	23	11		1		5		17	
(Austria)	Karl Giesser	27	15	1	2	1	1		18	2
(Austria)	Gerhard Hanappi	27	25	5	2		5		32	5
(Austria)	Lambert Lenzinger	20	13				1		14	
Forwards
(Austria)	Josef Bertalan	21	8	2	1		2		11	2
(Austria)	Robert Dienst	28	21	32	3	1	5	1	29	34
(Austria)	Paul Halla	25	26	10	3		5	1	34	11
(Austria)	Josef Höltl	19	24		2		4		30	
(Austria)	Alfred Körner	30	20	10	3		5	2	28	12
(Austria)	Robert Körner	31	6		3		3	1	12	1
(Austria)	Bruno Mehsarosch	22	9	7	1				10	7
(Austria)	Johann Riegler	26	20	25	3		4	5	27	30
(Austria)	Herbert Schaffranek	18	7	3					7	3

== Fixtures and results ==
Win Draw Loss

=== League ===
Rd	Date	Venue	Opponent	Res.	Att.	Goals and discipline
1	25.08.1956	H	Simmering	1-1	10,000	Körner A. 35'
2	01.09.1956	A	Admira	2-1	8,000	Dienst 35' 84'
3	05.09.1956	H	Wiener AC	7-4	5,000	Mehsarosch, Körner A., Hanappi, Dienst
4	09.09.1956	A	Kapfenberg	3-4	6,500	Körner A. 10', Halla 45', Dienst 74'
5	15.09.1956	H	Austria Salzburg	6-1	10,000	Körner A. 10', Dienst 12' 50' 70', Hanappi 71' (pen.), Mehsarosch 75'
6	23.09.1956	A	Vienna	1-4	33,000	Dienst 29'
7	07.10.1956	H	Austria Wien	4-1	30,000	Halla 56' 60', Mehsarosch 62', Golobic 63'
8	21.10.1956	A	Kremser SC	2-0	10,000	Hanappi 4', Happel 53' (pen.)
9	27.10.1956	H	GAK	1-1	9,000	Dienst 31'
10	04.11.1956	H	Stadlau	4-2	6,500	Körner A. 24' 64', Riegler 29', Halla 75'
11	10.11.1956	A	Sturm Graz	0-1	5,000	
12	18.11.1956	H	Wiener SC	3-1	8,500	Giesser 14', Riegler 46', Dienst 64'
13	25.11.1956	A	Wacker Wien	0-1	11,000	
14	02.12.1956	A	Simmering	2-1	6,000	Golobic 44', Happel 60'
15	16.03.1957	H	Admira	6-2	7,000	Dienst 16' 51' 72', Bertalan 35', Riegler 52' 63'
16	24.03.1957	A	Wiener AC	4-1	12,000	Riegler 29', Halla 60', Dienst 75' 82'
17	30.03.1957	H	Kapfenberg	8-1	5,000	Riegler 9' 40' 75', Dienst 17' 31', Mehsarosch 62' 86', Schaffranek 74'
18	07.04.1957	A	Austria Salzburg	5-4	7,000	Riegler 8' 15' 53' 76', Halla 57'
19	28.04.1957	H	Vienna	3-2	35,000	Halla 5' 60', Riegler 39'
20	12.05.1957	A	Austria Wien	3-2	25,000	Riegler 39', Halla 41', Mehsarosch 60'
21	18.05.1957	H	Kremser SC	12-1	6,000	Dienst 6' 12' 24' 56', Riegler 13' 30' 74' 75' 80', Körner A. 17', Hanappi 19', Schaffranek 66'
22	30.05.1957	A	GAK	5-1	8,000	Riegler, Körner A., Dienst
23	02.06.1957	A	Stadlau	9-1	8,000	Riegler 16' 43' 65', Halla 28', Körner A. 35', Dienst 40' 46' (pen.) 73', Hanappi 75'
24	08.06.1957	H	Sturm Graz	5-1	8,000	Happel 10' (pen.), Dienst 32' 65' 84', Schaffranek 82'
25	15.06.1957	A	Wiener SC	2-0	15,000	Riegler 32', Bertalan 89'
26	19.06.1957	H	Wacker Wien	2-4	8,000	Riegler, Dienst (pen.)

=== European Cup ===
Rd	Date	Venue	Opponent	Res.	Att.	Goals and discipline
R1-L1	01.11.1956	A	Real Madrid (Spain)	2-4	125,000	Dienst 58', Giesser 88'
R1-L2	14.11.1956	H	Real Madrid (Spain)	3-1	53,000	Happel 19' 38' (pen.) 41'
R1-PO	12.12.1956	A	Real Madrid (Spain)	0-2	100,000	

=== Mitropa Cup ===
Rd	Date	Venue	Opponent	Res.	Att.	Goals and discipline
QF-L1	30.06.1957	H	MTK Budapest (Hungary)	1-1	35,000	Halla
QF-L2	06.07.1957	A	MTK Budapest (Hungary)	3-3	50,000	Körner A., Dienst, Unknown (o.g.)
QF-PO	11.07.1957	H	MTK Budapest (Hungary)	4-1	25,000	Körner A., Körner R., Riegler
SF-L1	14.07.1957	H	Vojvodina (Socialist Federal Republic of Yugoslavia)	3-0	27,000	Riegler 25' 34', Happel 75'
SF-L2	21.07.1957	A	Vojvodina (Socialist Federal Republic of Yugoslavia)	1-4	25,000	Riegler 29'
