= 1954–55 SK Rapid Wien season =

Rapid Wien
1954–55 season
- Coach: Viktor Hierländer
- Stadium: Pfarrwiese, Vienna, Austria
- Staatsliga A: 3rd
- Top goalscorer: Robert Dienst (29)
- Average home league attendance: 11,700

The 1954–55 SK Rapid Wien season was the 57th season in club history.

== Squad ==
=== Squad statistics ===
| Nat. | Name | Age | League | |
| Nat. | Name | Age | Apps | Goals |
Goalkeepers
| (Austria) | Herbert Gartner | 21 | 14 | |
| (Austria) | Walter Zeman | 27 | 12 | |
Defenders
| (Austria) | Lothar Bilek | 21 | 12 | |
| (Austria) | Leopold Eineder | 21 | 1 | |
| (Austria) | Franz Golobic | 32 | 20 | |
| (Austria) | Ernst Happel | 28 | 2 | |
| (Austria) | Karl Hönig | 18 | 2 | |
| (Austria) | Robert Kaffka | 24 | 24 | |
Midfielders
| (Austria) | Leopold Gernhardt | 34 | 4 | |
| (Austria) | Karl Giesser | 25 | 19 | 1 |
| (Austria) | Gerhard Hanappi | 25 | 25 | 8 |
| (Austria) | Johann Riegler | 24 | 21 | 12 |
| (Austria) | Walter Vybiral | 22 | 2 | |
Forwards
| (Austria) | Josef Bertalan | 19 | 4 | |
| (Austria) | Robert Dienst | 26 | 24 | 29 |
| (Austria) | Paul Halla | 23 | 25 | 7 |
| (Austria) | Franz Häusler | 21 | 3 | 1 |
| (Austria) | Alfred Körner | 28 | 21 | 6 |
| (Austria) | Robert Körner | 29 | 22 | 4 |
| (Austria) | Bruno Mehsarosch | 20 | 8 | 7 |
| (Austria) | Johann Neuhold | 21 | 3 | 2 |
| (Austria) | Erich Probst | 26 | 16 | 8 |
| (Austria) | Bruno Schlager | | 2 | 1 |

== Fixtures and results ==
Win Draw Loss

=== League ===
| Rd | Date | Venue | Opponent | Res. | Att. | Goals and discipline |
|---|---|---|---|---|---|---|
| 1 | 29.08.1954 | H | Stadlau | 2-2 | 15,000 | Riegler 61', Dienst 68' |
| 2 | 05.09.1954 | A | Austria Wien | 1-2 | 35,000 | Dienst 3' |
| 3 | 11.09.1954 | H | Vienna | 1-1 | 14,000 | Hanappi 15' |
| 4 | 19.09.1954 | A | LASK | 2-5 | 16,000 | Hanappi 32', Körner A. 80' |
| 5 | 26.09.1954 | H | SW Bregenz | 8-0 | 10,000 | Mehsarosch 10', Hanappi 45' 88', Halla 50', Körner A. 66' 75', Riegler 73', Dienst 77' |
| 6 | 10.10.1954 | H | Simmering | 7-1 | 12,000 | Riegler 6', Dienst 30' 65', Mehsarosch 67' 73', Körner R. 70', Halla 77' |
| 7 | 17.10.1954 | A | Admira | 2-0 | 30,000 | Dienst 21' 52' |
| 8 | 24.10.1954 | H | GAK | 3-1 | 12,000 | Körner R. 8', Halla 27', Dienst 43' |
| 9 | 07.11.1954 | A | Kapfenberg | 7-4 | 8,000 | Hanappi 2' 80', Halla 3', Dienst 5' 16' 46', Körner R. 61' (pen.) |
| 10 | 21.11.1954 | H | Wiener SC | 2-1 | 25,000 | Probst E. 15', Dienst 21' |
| 11 | 28.11.1954 | A | FC Wien | 6-0 | 8,000 | Halla 11', Dienst 30' 47' 77', Riegler 82', Körner R. 88' |
| 12 | 05.12.1954 | A | Wacker Wien | 3-3 | 17,000 | Dienst 11', Körner A. 34', Halla 86' |
| 13 | 12.12.1954 | A | Austria Salzburg | 1-1 | 8,000 | Dienst 75' |
| 14 | 27.02.1955 | A | Stadlau | 2-0 | 5,500 | Häusler 53', Halla 87' |
| 15 | 06.03.1955 | H | Austria Wien | 3-3 | 12,000 | Dienst 1', Probst E. 28' 52' |
| 16 | 22.05.1955 | A | Vienna | 0-5 | 25,000 | |
| 17 | 19.03.1955 | H | LASK | 6-2 | 6,000 | Dienst 2', Riegler 16' 20' 25' 28' 42' |
| 18 | 03.04.1955 | A | SW Bregenz | 5-0 | 8,000 | Dienst 16' 88', Neuhold 40', Körner A. 60' (pen.), Probst E. 65' |
| 19 | 16.04.1955 | A | Simmering | 1-0 | 6,000 | Dienst 38' |
| 20 | 08.05.1955 | H | Admira | 5-2 | 22,000 | Probst E. 25' 33' 50' 89', Dienst 55' |
| 21 | 15.05.1955 | A | GAK | 4-4 | 7,000 | Dienst 3' 28', Mehsarosch 10' 39' |
| 22 | 05.06.1955 | H | Kapfenberg | 1-2 | 7,000 | Neuhold 57' |
| 23 | 09.06.1955 | A | Wiener SC | 2-2 | 32,000 | Giesser (pen.), Barschandt (o.g.) |
| 24 | 12.06.1955 | H | FC Wien | 3-3 | 5,000 | Riegler 3' 29', Dienst 13' |
| 25 | 18.06.1955 | H | Wacker Wien | 3-1 | 10,000 | Schlager 14', Mehsarosch 22', Körner A. 85' |
| 26 | 22.06.1955 | H | Austria Salzburg | 7-2 | 2,500 | Riegler 5', Mehsarosch 12', Hanappi 47' 73', Dienst 74' 76' 78' |
