= 1954 FIFA World Cup qualification Group 5 =

Football tournament qualifying stage

The 1954 FIFA World Cup qualification Group 5 contained Austria and Portugal.

== Table ==
Rank	Team	Pts	Pld	W	D	L	GF	GA	GD
1	Austria	3	2	1	1	0	9	1	+8
2	Portugal	1	2	0	1	1	1	9	-8

== Matches ==
27 September 1953	Austria	9–1	Portugal	Vienna, Austria
	Ocwirk 13'; Probst 14' 19' 31' 59' 70'; Happel 68' (pen.); Wagner 83'; Dienst 87'	Report	Águas 60'	Stadium: Praterstadion; Referee: Bauwens (Belgium)

29 November 1953	Portugal	0–0	Austria	Lisbon, Portugal
		Report		Stadium: Estádio Nacional; Referee: Harzic (France)

Austria qualified.

== Team stats ==
=== Austria ===
Head coach: (Austria) Walter Nausch

Pos.	Player	DoB	Games played	Goals	Minutes played	Sub off	Sub on	(Portugal)	(Portugal)	Club
FW	Robert Dienst	1 March 1928	2	1	180	0	0	90	90	(Austria) SK Rapid Wien
MF	Franz Golobic	7 April 1922	2	0	180	0	0	90	90	(Austria) SK Rapid Wien
MF	Gerhard Hanappi	16 February 1929	2	0	180	0	0	90	90	(Austria) SK Rapid Wien
DF	Ernst Happel	29 November 1925	1	1	90	0	0	90	–	(Austria) SK Rapid Wien
FW	Walter Haummer	22 November 1928	1	0	90	0	0	–	90	(Austria) Wacker Wien
DF	Walter Kollmann	17 June 1932	1	0	90	0	0	–	90	(Austria) Wacker Wien
FW	Alfred Körner	14 February 1926	1	0	45	1	0	45	–	(Austria) SK Rapid Wien
FW	Robert Körner	21 August 1924	1	0	90	0	0	90	–	(Austria) SK Rapid Wien
FW	Ernst Melchior	26 June 1920	1	0	90	0	0	–	90	FK Austria Wien
MF	Ernst Ocwirk	7 March 1926	2	1	180	0	0	90	90	FK Austria Wien
FW	Erich Probst	5 December 1927	2	5	180	0	0	90	90	(Austria) SK Rapid Wien
DF	Karl Stotz	27 March 1927	2	0	180	0	0	90	90	FK Austria Wien
FW	Theodor Wagner	6 August 1927	2	1	180	0	0	90	90	(Austria) Wacker Wien
FW	Otto Walzhofer	21 June 1926	1	0	90	0	1	45	–	(Austria) First Vienna
GK	Walter Zeman	1 May 1927	2	0	180	0	0	90	90	(Austria) SK Rapid Wien

=== Portugal ===
Head coach: (Portugal) Salvador do Campo

Pos.	Player	DoB	Games played	Goals	Minutes played	Sub off	Sub on	(Austria)	(Austria)	Club
FW	José Águas	9 November 1930	1	1	180	0	0	90	–	(Portugal) S.L. Benfica
MF	Serafim Baptista	21 May 1925	1	0	90	0	0	90	–	(Portugal) Boavista F.C.
GK	Barrigana	28 April 1922	1	0	90	0	0	90	–	(Portugal) F.C. Porto
FW	Fernando Cabrita	1 May 1923	1	0	43	1	0	–	43	(Portugal) S.C. Covilhã
DF	Ângelo Carvalho	3 August 1925	2	0	180	0	0	90	90	(Portugal) F.C. Porto
FW	Rogério Pipi	7 December 1922	1	0	90	0	0	90	–	(Portugal) S.L. Benfica
MF	Castela	26 October 1928	1	0	90	0	0	90	–	(Portugal) Belenenses
FW	Monteiro da Costa	20 August 1928	1	0	90	0	0	–	90	(Portugal) F.C. Porto
DF	Félix	14 December 1922	1	0	90	0	0	90	–	(Portugal) S.L. Benfica
DF	Germano	23 December 1932	1	0	47	0	1	–	47	Atlético Clube de Portugal
GK	Carlos Gomes	18 January 1932	1	0	90	0	0	–	90	Sporting Clube de Portugal
MF	Hernâni	1 September 1931	1	0	90	0	0	–	90	(Portugal) F.C. Porto
DF	Ângelo Martins	19 April 1930	1	0	90	0	0	90	–	(Portugal) S.L. Benfica
FW	Matateu	26 July 1927	1	0	90	0	0	–	90	(Portugal) Belenenses
DF	Virgílio Mendes	17 November 1926	2	0	180	0	0	90	90	(Portugal) F.C. Porto
DF	Serafim Neves	29 August 1920	1	0	90	0	0	–	90	(Portugal) Belenenses
MF	Passos	26 March 1922	1	0	90	0	0	–	90	Sporting Clube de Portugal
FW	Travassos	22 February 1926	1	0	90	0	0	90	–	Sporting Clube de Portugal
FW	Vasques	29 July 1926	2	0	180	0	0	90	90	Sporting Clube de Portugal
DF	Artur Vaz	3 April 1926	1	0	90	0	0	–	90	(Portugal) Vitória de Setúbal
