= 1959–60 SK Rapid Wien season =

Rapid Wien
1959–60 season
- Coach: Robert Körner
- Stadium: Pfarrwiese, Vienna, Austria
- Staatsliga A: Champions (22nd title)
- Cup: Runner-up
- Top goalscorer: League: Robert Dienst (25); All: Robert Dienst (27)
- Average home league attendance: 9,200

The 1959–60 SK Rapid Wien season was the 62nd season in club history.

== Squad ==
=== Squad statistics ===
Nat.	Name	Age	League		Cup		Total	
Nat.	Name	Age	Apps	Goals	Apps	Goals	Apps	Goals
Goalkeepers
(Austria)	Josef Eder	21	3		3		6	
(Austria)	Dieter Pflug	25	5+1		1+1		6+2	
(Austria)	Walter Zeman	32	18+1		1+1		19+2	
Defenders
(Austria)	Walter Glechner	20	23	2	4		27	2
(Austria)	Paul Halla	28	22	1	4		26	1
(Austria)	Josef Höltl	22	24		3		27	
(Austria)	Wilhelm Zaglitsch	22	13		5		18	
Midfielders
(Austria)	Lothar Bilek	26	2		3		5	
(Austria)	Karl Giesser	30	26	1	5	2	31	3
(Austria)	Gerhard Hanappi	30	25	6	2		27	6
(Austria)	Walter Skocik	18	10	3	4	2	14	5
Forwards
(Austria)	Josef Bertalan	24	23	10	5		28	10
(Austria)	Robert Dienst	31	25	25	4	2	29	27
(Austria)	Rudolf Flögel	19	24	14	5	6	29	20
(Austria)	Lambert Lenzinger	23	1				1	
(West Germany)	Kurt Linder	25	9	5	1		10	5
(Austria)	Rudolf Nuske	16	1		1		2	
(Austria)	Peter Reiter	22	16	16			16	16
(Austria)	Herbert Schaffranek	21	3				3	
(Austria)	Stefan Zajic	22	13	3	4	1	17	4

== Fixtures and results ==
Win Draw Loss

=== League ===
Rd	Date	Venue	Opponent	Res.	Att.	Goals and discipline
1	29.08.1959	A	Wiener Neustadt	4-1	10,000	Dienst 12' 57', Halla 66', Reiter P. 85'
2	05.09.1959	H	Austria Wien	1-2	11,000	Reiter P. 55'
3	13.09.1959	A	Austria Salzburg	6-1	10,000	Reiter P. 7' 50' 71' 85', Dienst 53', Zajic 79'
4	20.09.1959	A	Leoben	2-0	5,500	Flögel 40', Zajic 83'
5	26.09.1959	H	GAK	4-2	9,000	Flögel 2', Dienst 20' 32', Reiter P. 22'
6	04.10.1959	A	Wiener SC	2-2	51,000	Bertalan 12', Reiter P. 35'
7	10.10.1959	H	Admira	3-1	7,000	Glechner 4' (pen.), Reiter P. 26' 42'
8	17.10.1959	H	Vienna	4-1	10,000	Reiter P. 20', Hanappi 28', Glechner 54' (pen.), Flögel 85'
9	25.10.1959	A	Wacker Wien	3-1	12,000	Flögel 50' 54', Zajic 86'
10	31.10.1959	H	LASK	5-1	7,000	Bertalan 16', Dienst 25' 88', Reiter P. 60', Flögel 80'
11	07.11.1959	A	Simmering	2-2	2,500	Dienst 74' 78'
12	14.11.1959	H	Kremser SC	7-1	6,000	Dienst 2' 19', Bertalan 43', Reiter P. 47' 53' 80', Flögel 51'
13	29.11.1959	A	Wiener AC	2-1	12,000	Dienst 1' 46'
14	28.02.1960	H	Wiener Neustadt	5-1	9,000	Giesser 5', Bertalan 11' 60', Reiter P. 44', Dienst 85'
15	05.03.1960	A	Austria Wien	3-1	10,000	Dienst 16', Bertalan 80' 86'
16	12.03.1960	H	Austria Salzburg	2-2	6,000	Linder 83', Bertalan 84'
17	20.03.1960	H	Leoben	5-0	5,000	Linder 14' 14' 85', Flögel 31', Hanappi 80'
18	02.04.1960	A	GAK	1-0	4,000	Dienst 31'
19	10.04.1960	H	Wiener SC	6-1	27,000	Dienst 53' 87', Flögel 61' 63', Bertalan 75', Hanappi 84'
20	18.06.1960	A	Admira	3-2	6,000	Dienst 70' 81', Flögel 87'
21	24.04.1960	A	Vienna	2-2	32,000	Röckl 21' (o.g.), Hanappi 89'
22	08.05.1960	H	Wacker Wien	5-0	6,000	Hanappi 10', Dienst 22' 70', Flögel 60', Skocik 82'
23	14.05.1960	A	LASK	1-1	20,000	Flögel 69'
24	22.05.1960	H	Simmering	4-0	8,000	Skocik 9', Linder 17', Dienst 70', Flögel 73'
25	05.06.1960	A	Kremser SC	2-2	6,500	Dienst 36', Hanappi 73'
26	12.06.1960	H	Wiener AC	3-4	9,000	Dienst 10', Bertalan 23', Skocik 58'

=== Cup ===
Rd	Date	Venue	Opponent	Res.	Att.	Goals and discipline
R1	05.04.1960	H	Simmering	3-2	3,000	Zajic, Flögel, Skocik
R16	03.05.1960	H	Admira	2-1	3,000	Flögel
QF	01.06.1960	A	Wiener AC	2-1	3,000	Flögel 15' 86'
SF	15.06.1960	H	SV Linz	4-3	6,500	Skocik, Giesser, Dienst
F	25.06.1960	N	Austria Wien	2-4	16,000	Giesser 35', Flögel 84'
