= 1958–59 SK Rapid Wien season =

Rapid Wien
1958–59 season
- Coach: Rudolf Kumhofer
- Stadium: Pfarrwiese, Vienna, Austria
- Staatsliga A: 2nd
- Cup: Runner-up
- Top goalscorer: League: Robert Dienst (28); All: Robert Dienst (31)
- Average home league attendance: 9,900

The 1958–59 SK Rapid Wien season was the 61st season in club history.

== Squad ==
=== Squad statistics ===
Nat.	Name	Age	League		Cup		Total		Discipline
Nat.	Name	Age	Apps	Goals	Apps	Goals	Apps	Goals	Red card
Goalkeepers
(Austria)	Walter Traube	21	1+1		0+1		1+2		
(Austria)	Walter Zeman	31	25		5		30		
Defenders
(Austria)	Walter Glechner	19	7		4		11		
(Austria)	Franz Golobic	36	23	1	3		26	1	1
(Austria)	Ernst Happel	32	19	7	1	1	20	8	
(Austria)	Josef Höltl	21	20		5		25		
(Austria)	Lambert Lenzinger	22	1				1		
(Austria)	Wilhelm Zaglitsch	21	3		3		6		
Midfielders
(Austria)	Lothar Bilek	25	5		2		7		
(Austria)	Karl Giesser	29	24	1	4		28	1	
(Austria)	Gerhard Hanappi	29	26	6	5	1	31	7	
Forwards
(Austria)	Josef Bertalan	23	17	3	5	1	22	4	
(Austria)	Robert Dienst	30	24	28	4	3	28	31	
(Austria)	Rudolf Flögel	18	10	3	4	1	14	4	
(Austria)	Paul Halla	27	26	5	5	2	31	7	
(Austria)	Alfred Körner	32	23	8	3	3	26	11	
(Austria)	Karl Osicka	19	1	2			1	2	
(Austria)	Peter Reiter	21	25	24	2	4	27	28	
(Austria)	Johann Riegler	28	6	7			6	7	

== Fixtures and results ==
Win Draw Loss

=== League ===
Rd	Date	Venue	Opponent	Res.	Att.	Goals and discipline
1	30.08.1958	H	Olympia Vienna	10-0	12,000	Schors 4' (o.g.), Körner A. 11' 53', Reiter P. 21' 89', Riegler 39' 67', Dienst 44' 59', Flögel 86'
2	07.09.1958	A	Kapfenberg	3-1	7,000	Reiter P. 3' 77', Riegler 23'
3	20.09.1958	H	Vienna	1-1	25,000	Dienst 40'
4	27.09.1958	A	Wiener AC	2-0	10,000	Riegler 40', Happel 79'
5	11.10.1958	H	Admira	5-2	7,000	Riegler 18' 39', Reiter P. 58' 61', Happel 73' (pen.)
6	19.10.1958	A	Wiener SC	3-4	50,000	Hanappi 25', Riegler 45', Halla 81'
7	26.10.1958	H	Kremser SC	3-1	6,500	Bertalan 8', Happel 35', Reiter P. 53'
8	02.11.1958	A	Wacker Wien	5-1	16,000	Dienst 38' 68', Halla 47' 77', Happel 61'
9	08.11.1958	H	Leoben	9-0	6,000	Reiter P. 16' 31' 40' (pen.), Dienst 19' 23' 56' 66', Hanappi 27', Körner A. 86'
10	23.11.1958	H	GAK	2-1	10,000	Fraydl 12' (o.g.), Bertalan 26'
11	30.11.1958	A	LASK	4-1	15,000	Körner A. 65', Dienst 68' 78', Reiter P. 82'
12	07.12.1958	H	Simmering	6-3	8,000	Reiter P. 3' 43', Happel 4', Dienst 5', Pecanka 31' (o.g.), Körner A. 65'
13	13.12.1958	A	Austria Wien	4-1	12,000	Bertalan 4', Stotz 49' (o.g.), Dienst 69' 78'
14	01.03.1959	A	Olympia Vienna	3-0	8,000	Osicka 40' 64', Hanappi 67'
15	18.03.1959	H	Kapfenberg	9-2	5,000	Dienst 8' 66' 74', Reiter P. 15' 30' 58', Happel 44' (pen.), Flögel 49', Halla 62'
16	14.03.1959	A	Vienna	1-0	14,000	Dienst 40'
17	22.03.1959	H	Wiener AC	1-1	9,000	Happel 29' (pen.)
18	05.04.1959	A	Admira	3-0	7,000	Körner A. 15', Reiter P. 17', Pinggera 36' (o.g.)
19	11.04.1959	H	Wiener SC	2-3	20,000	Hanappi 46' 76'
20	19.04.1959	A	Kremser SC	3-1	5,000	Reiter P. 11', Dienst 60' 89'; Golobic (red card) 57'
21	25.04.1959	H	Wacker Wien	2-0	8,000	Dienst 5', Giesser 34'
22	03.05.1959	A	Leoben	6-1	6,000	Reiter P. 48' 57' 77' 86', Dienst 80', Golobic 89'
23	10.05.1959	A	GAK	1-2	8,000	Dienst 48'
24	30.05.1959	H	LASK	8-0	4,000	Körner A., Hanappi, Flögel, Dienst, Praschak (o.g.)
25	06.06.1959	A	Simmering	4-2	7,000	Reiter P. 6', Karel 12' (o.g.), Halla 24', Dienst 85'
26	20.06.1959	H	Austria Wien	2-1	8,000	Reiter P. 43', Dienst 44'

=== Cup ===
Rd	Date	Venue	Opponent	Res.	Att.	Goals and discipline
R1	08.04.1959	A	Wiener Neustadt	3-1	8,500	Happel, Bertalan, Dienst 88'
R16	07.05.1959	A	VSE St. Pölten	8-1	5,000	Reiter P., Körner A., Flögel
QF	27.05.1959	H	Austria Wien	2-1	20,000	Dienst 28', Halla 88'
SF	17.06.1959	H	GAK	3-0	8,000	Dienst 6', Hanappi 11' (pen.), Halla 31'
F	24.06.1959	N	Wiener AC	0-2	10,000	
