= 1956 Mitropa Cup =

Tournament details
- Dates: 24 June – 4 August 1956
- Teams: 8

Final positions
- Champions: (Hungary) Vasas (1st title)
- Runners-up: (Austria) Rapid Wien

Tournament statistics
- Matches played: 16
- Goals scored: 71 (4.44 per match)

The 1956 Mitropa Cup was the 16th season of the Mitropa football club tournament. It was won by Vasas who beat Rapid Wien 9–2 in a play-off match, after the two-legged final ended 4–4 on aggregate.

== Quarter-finals ==
Matches played between 24 June and 1 July 1956.

Team 1	Agg.	Team 2	1st leg	2nd leg
Rapid Wien (Austria)	4–3	(Czechoslovakia) Slovan Bratislava	3–0	1–3
Wacker Wien (Austria)	2–2^{1}	(Socialist Federal Republic of Yugoslavia) Partizan	1–1	1–1
Red Star (Socialist Federal Republic of Yugoslavia)	4–6	(Hungary) Vörös Lobogó	1–1	3–5
Vasas (Hungary)	4–2	(Czechoslovakia) ÚDA Praha	2–0	2–2

^{1} Partizan beat Wacker Wien 4–0 in a play-off to qualify for the Semi-finals.

=== First leg ===
23 June 1956

Rapid Wien (Austria)	3 – 0	(Czechoslovakia) Slovan Bratislava
R. Korner 65', 67'; Hanappi 71'

Vienna
Referee: Sándor Harangozó (Hungary)

24 June 1956

Red Star (Socialist Federal Republic of Yugoslavia)	1 – 1	(Hungary) Vörös Lobogó
Kostić 40'	Report	Sándor 35'

Stadion JNA, Belgrade
Attendance: 50,000

24 June 1956

Vasas (Hungary)	2 – 0	(Czechoslovakia) ÚDA Praha
Csordás 82'; Lenkei 84'	Report

Népstadion, Budapest
Attendance: 50,000

=== Second leg ===
30 June 1956

Slovan Bratislava (Czechoslovakia)	3 – 1	(Austria) Rapid Wien
Hlavatý 54', 81'; Kováč 60' (pen.)		Hanappi 80'

Bratislava
Referee: István Zsolt (Hungary)

Rapid Wien won 4–3 on aggregate.

30 June 1956

ÚDA Praha (Czechoslovakia)	2 – 2	(Hungary) Vasas
Masopust 33'; Přáda 65'	Report	Csordás 13'; Lenkei 51'

Československé armády-Strahov, Prague
Attendance: 45,000

Vasas won 4–2 on aggregate.

1 July 1956

Vörös Lobogó (Hungary)	5 – 3	(Socialist Federal Republic of Yugoslavia) Red Star
Tasić 2' (o.g.); Spajić 38' (o.g.); Hidegkuti 48'; Szolnok 64'; Palotás 66'	Report	Toplak 26'; Kostić 44', ?'

Népstadion, Budapest
Attendance: 65,000

Vörös Lobogó won 6–4 on aggregate.

== Semi-finals ==
Matches played between 7 and 14 July 1956.

Team 1	Agg.	Team 2	1st leg	2nd leg
Rapid Wien (Austria)	7–6	(Hungary) Vörös Lobogó	3–3	4–3
Partizan (Socialist Federal Republic of Yugoslavia)	2–6	(Hungary) Vasas	1–0	1–6

=== First leg ===
7 July 1956

Rapid Wien (Austria)	3 – 3	(Hungary) Vörös Lobogó
Körner 12', 46' (pen.), 60'	Report	Hidegkuti 61', 73'; Palotás 75'

Praterstadion, Vienna
Attendance: 45,000

8 July 1956

Partizan (Socialist Federal Republic of Yugoslavia)	1 – 0	(Hungary) Vasas
Valok 20'	Report

Stadion JNA, Belgrade
Attendance: 40,000

=== Second leg ===
14 July 1956

Vörös Lobogó (Hungary)	3 – 4	(Austria) Rapid Wien
Szolnok 29'; Palotás 48', 50'	Report	Hanappi 10', 17'; Körner 20'; Mehsarosch 83'

Népstadion, Budapest
Attendance: 80,000

14 July 1956

Vasas (Hungary)	6 – 1	(Socialist Federal Republic of Yugoslavia) Partizan
Szilágyi 3'; Csordás 9', 78', 88'; Bundzsák 38'; Lenkei 83'	Report	Marković 31'

Népstadion, Budapest
Attendance: 80,000

== Final ==
Team 1	Agg.	Team 2	1st leg	2nd leg
Rapid Wien (Austria)	4–4^{1}	(Hungary) Vasas	3–3	1–1

^{1} Vasas beat Rapid Wien 9–2 in a play-off to win the Mitropa Cup.

=== First leg ===
21 July 1956

Rapid Wien (Austria)	3 – 3	(Hungary) Vasas
Körner 3', 14'; Mehsarosch 19'	Report	Szilágyi 2'; Bundzsák 47'; Csordás 58'

Praterstadion, Vienna
Attendance: 52,000

=== Second leg ===
28 July 1956

Vasas (Hungary)	1 – 1	(Austria) Rapid Wien
Szilágyi 3'	Report	Bertalan 60'

Népstadion, Budapest
Attendance: 100,000

Play-off

4 August 1956

Vasas (Hungary)	9 – 2	(Austria) Rapid Wien
Csordás 21', 28'; Raduly 43', 80'; Szilágyi 47', 52', 56', 70'; Teleki 88'	Report	Riegler 32', 85'

Népstadion, Budapest
Attendance: 100,000

== See also ==
- 1956–57 European Cup
