= 1948–49 SK Rapid Wien season =

Rapid Wien
1948–49 season
- Coach: Hans Pesser
- Stadium: Pfarrwiese, Vienna, Austria
- Liga: 2nd
- Cup: Round of 16
- Top goalscorer: League: Leopold Ströll (15); All: Leopold Ströll (17)
- Average home league attendance: 16,600

The 1948–49 SK Rapid Wien season was the 51st season in club history.

== Squad ==
=== Squad statistics ===
| Nat. | Name | Age | League | | Cup | | Total | | Discipline |
| Nat. | Name | Age | Apps | Goals | Apps | Goals | Apps | Goals | Red card |
Goalkeepers
| (Austria) | Josef Musil | 27 | 2 | | | | 2 | | |
| (Austria) | Walter Zeman | 21 | 16 | | 3 | | 19 | | |
Defenders
| (Austria) | Ernst Happel | 22 | 13 | 1 | 3 | | 16 | 1 | |
| (Austria) | Alfred Pavuza | 23 | 1 | | | | 1 | | |
| (Austria) | Stefan Wagner | 34 | 16 | | 1 | | 17 | | |
Midfielders
| (Austria) | Leopold Gernhardt | 28 | 16 | | 2 | | 18 | | |
| (Austria) | Franz Golobic | 26 | 10 | | 3 | | 13 | | |
| (Austria) | Franz Kaspirek | 30 | | | 1 | | 1 | | |
| (Austria) | Max Merkel | 29 | 16 | 1 | 3 | 1 | 19 | 2 | |
| (Austria) | Erich Müller | 20 | 11 | | 2 | | 13 | | |
| (Austria) | Franz Wagner | 36 | 7 | | | | 7 | | |
Forwards
| (Austria) | Franz Binder | 36 | 6 | 2 | 1 | 2 | 7 | 4 | |
| (Austria) | Friedrich Csarmann | | 2 | | | | 2 | | |
| (Austria) | Robert Dienst | 20 | 8 | 12 | 2 | | 10 | 12 | |
| (Austria) | Adalbert Kaubek | 22 | 1 | | 1 | | 2 | | |
| (Austria) | Roman Knor | 21 | 6 | | | | 6 | | |
| (Austria) | Alfred Körner | 22 | 18 | 10 | 3 | 1 | 21 | 11 | 1 |
| (Austria) | Robert Körner | 23 | 18 | 9 | 2 | | 20 | 9 | |
| (Austria) | Johann Riegler | 18 | 8 | 8 | 2 | 1 | 10 | 9 | |
| (Austria) | Kurt Schindlauer | 19 | 4 | 1 | 1 | | 5 | 1 | |
| (Austria) | Ferdinand Smetana | 24 | 1 | | | | 1 | | |
| (Austria) | Leopold Ströll | 26 | 18 | 15 | 3 | 2 | 21 | 17 | |

== Fixtures and results ==
Win Draw Loss

=== League ===
| Rd | Date | Venue | Opponent | Res. | Att. | Goals and discipline |
|---|---|---|---|---|---|---|
| 1 | 28.08.1948 | H | Wacker Wien | 1-1 | 38,000 | Ströll 36' |
| 2 | 05.09.1948 | A | Vienna | 1-5 | 30,000 | Schindlauer 10' |
| 3 | 11.09.1948 | H | FAC | 2-0 | 5,000 | Körner A. 9' 82' |
| 4 | 18.09.1948 | A | Oberlaa | 5-1 | 5,000 | Körner A. 14', Ströll 18' 25' 28' 62' |
| 5 | 26.09.1948 | H | Wiener SC | 1-1 | 15,000 | Merkel 8' |
| 6 | 10.10.1948 | H | FC Wien | 5-1 | 8,000 | Ströll 23' 73' 83', Binder 37', Körner R. 55' |
| 7 | 17.10.1948 | A | Admira | 2-3 | 28,000 | Körner R. 31', Binder 62' |
| 8 | 24.10.1948 | H | Austria Wien | 1-2 | 42,000 | Körner R. 28' (pen.) |
| 9 | 06.11.1948 | A | Hochstädt | 2-2 | 5,000 | Körner R. 9' (pen.), Körner A. 23' |
| 10 | 27.02.1949 | A | Wacker Wien | 2-1 | 15,000 | Körner R. 34', Ströll 72' |
| 11 | 07.03.1949 | H | Vienna | 2-1 | 12,000 | Körner R. 62' (pen.), Ströll 68' |
| 12 | 13.03.1949 | A | FAC | 8-2 | 6,500 | Riegler 13', Dienst 16' 60', Ströll 18', Körner A. 55' 76' 89', Fischer 83' (o.g.) |
| 13 | 27.03.1949 | H | Oberlaa | 4-0 | 8,000 | Riegler 11' 65', Ströll 16', Körner A. 70' |
| 14 | 10.04.1949 | A | Wiener SC | 3-1 | 20,000 | Dienst 55' 71', Körner R. 90' |
| 15 | 24.04.1949 | A | FC Wien | 6-1 | 21,000 | Dienst 40' 50' 60' 85', Srb 65' (o.g.), Ströll 80' |
| 16 | 14.05.1949 | H | Hochstädt | 9-1 | 5,000 | Riegler 30' 33' 60' 63', Dienst 52' 71', Happel 57', Ströll 74', Körner A. 83' |
| 17 | 29.05.1949 | A | Austria Wien | 3-5 | 50,000 | Dienst 11', Körner R. 22', Ströll 64' |
| 18 | 28.04.1949 | H | Admira | 4-1 | 16,000 | Riegler 6', Dienst 8', Körner A. 27', Körner R. 32' |

=== Cup ===
| Rd | Date | Venue | Opponent | Res. | Att. | Goals and discipline |
|---|---|---|---|---|---|---|
| R1 | 21.11.1948 | H | Feuerwehr Wien | 4-1 | 2,200 | Ströll, Körner A., Binder |
| R16 | 23.01.1949 | H | Austria Wien | 1-1 (a.e.t.) | 40,000 | Riegler 116'; Körner A. (red card) |
| R16-PO | 19.02.1949 | A | Austria Wien | 2-3 | 29,000 | Ströll 49', Merkel 51' |
