= Franz Riegler =

Franz Riegler may refer to:

- Franz Riegler (footballer, born 1915) (known as Bobby; 1915–1989), Austrian international footballer
- Franz Riegler (footballer, born 1922) (known as Franz Riegler II; 1922–1945), Austrian footballer who represented Germany internationally

== See also ==
- Rigler
