= 1954 Taça de Portugal final =

- Event: 1953–54 Taça de Portugal
| Sporting CP | Vitória de Setúbal |
| 3 | 2 |
- Date: 27 June 1954
- Venue: Estádio Nacional, Oeiras
- Referee: Braga Barros (Leiria)

The 1954 Taça de Portugal final was the final match of the 1953–54 Taça de Portugal, the 14th season of the Taça de Portugal, the premier Portuguese football cup competition organized by the Portuguese Football Federation (FPF). The match was played on 27 June 1954 at the Estádio Nacional in Oeiras, and opposed two Primeira Liga sides: Sporting CP and Vitória de Setúbal. Sporting CP defeated Vitória de Setúbal 3–2 to claim their fifth Taça de Portugal.

== Match ==
=== Details ===
27 June 1954

| Sporting CP | 3–2 | Vitória de Setúbal |
|---|---|---|
| João Martins 15'; Mendonça 18', 54' | | Soares 24', 40' |

Estádio Nacional, Oeiras
Referee: Braga Barros (Leiria)

| Sporting CP | Vitória de Setúbal |

| GK | 1 | (Portugal) Carlos Gomes |
| DF | | (Portugal) João Galaz |
| DF | | (Portugal) António Lourenço |
| MF | | (Portugal) Mário Gonçalves |
| MF | | (Portugal) Juca |
| FW | | (Portugal) João Martins |
| FW | | (Portugal) Galileu Moura (c) |
| FW | | (Portugal) Fernando Mendonça |
| FW | | (Portugal) Manuel Vasques |
| FW | | (Hungary) János Hrotkó |
| FW | | (Portugal) José Travassos |
Substitutes:
Manager:
(Hungary) József Szabó

| GK | 1 | (Portugal) Francisco Baptista |
| DF | | (Portugal) Jacinto Forreta |
| DF | | (Portugal) Manuel Joaquim Coelho |
| MF | | (Portugal) Orlando Barros (c) |
| MF | | (Portugal) Fernando Casaca |
| MF | | (Portugal) Emídio Graça |
| MF | | (Portugal) Artur Vaz |
| FW | | (Portugal) Joaquim Soares |
| FW | | (Portugal) António Fernandes |
| FW | | (Portugal) Pinto de Almeida |
| FW | | (Portugal) António Inácio |
Substitutes:
Manager:
(Hungary) János Biri

1953–54 Taça de Portugal Winners
Sporting CP
5th Title

Match officials

- Assistant referees:
- Fourth official:

Match rules

- 90 minutes.
