= Hanappi =

Hanappi is a German surname. Notable people with the surname include:

- Edeltraud Hanappi-Egger (born 1964), Austrian academic
- Gerhard Hanappi (1929–1980), Austrian footballer
- Hardy Hanappi (born 1951), Austrian economist
