= Rigler =

Rigler or Riegler is a surname. It may refer to:

== Riegler ==
- Adam Riegler (born 1998), American child actor
- Alessandra Riegler (born 1961), Italian chess grandmaster
- Christoph Riegler (born 1992), Austrian footballer
- Claudia Riegler (snowboarder) (born 1973), snowboarder
- Claudia Riegler (skier) (born 1976), Austrian skier
- Elisabeth Riegler (born 1995), Austrian cyclist
- Franz Riegler (footballer, born 1915) (known as Bobby; 1915–1989), Austrian international footballer
- Franz Riegler (footballer, born 1922) (known as Franz Riegler II; 1922–1945), Austrian footballer who represented Germany internationally
- Jan Marc Riegler (born 1988), Austrian footballer
- Johann Riegler (1929–2011), Austrian international footballer

== Rigler ==
- Cy Rigler (1882–1935), American baseball umpire and coach
- Eric Rigler, American player of the Uilleann pipes, Great Highland Bagpipes, and tin whistle
- Franz Paul Rigler (1747/1748–1796), Austrian piano virtuoso, composer, teacher and theorist
- Leo George Rigler (1896–1979), American radiologist
- Lloyd Rigler (1915–2003), American businessman and philanthropist

== See also ==
- Rigler's sign, named for Leo George Rigler
