= Hanapi =

Hanapi may refer to:

- Arif Aiman Hanapi (born 2002), Malaysian footballer
- Yasir Hanapi (born 1989), Singaporian footballer
- Zulkafperi Hanapi (born 1959), Malaysian politician

== See also ==
- Hanappi
