= Dienst =

Dienst is a surname. Notable people with the surname include:

- Gottfried Dienst (1919–1998), Swiss football referee
- Robert Dienst (1928–2000), Austrian footballer
