= Lenkei =

Lenkei is a Hungarian surname. Notable people with the surname include:

- Ferenc Lenkei (born 1946), Hungarian swimmer
- Magda Lenkei (1916–2007), Hungarian swimmer
- Sándor Lenkei (1936–2003), Hungarian footballer
