= Markersdorf Airfield =

Former airfield in Austria, 1938–1945

Markersdorf Airfield
- Markersdorf-Haindorf, Sankt Pölten-Land district in Austria

Site information
- Operator: Luftwaffe
- Controlled by: Fliegerhorst-Kommandantur A 11 / XVII

Location
- Location in Austria
- Coordinates: 48°11′00″N 15°29′57″E

Site history
- Built: 1938; 88 years ago
- In use: 1938 - 1945
- Demolished: 1945
- Events: World War II

Markersdorf Airfield was a military airport located in Markersdorf-Haindorf, Sankt Pölten-Land district in Lower Austria. It was established in 1938 for training use by the Luftwaffe, and operated throughout World War II as a recovery and maintenance center for fighter squadrons returning from the front. In 1944, it was heavily bombed by Allies forces and abandoned in 1945 during the Red Army advance.

== History ==
=== Construction ===
In 1937, the Austrian Armed Forces developed plans for the construction of a military airfield Markersdorf, as it provided a geographically flat location due to the presence of an extensive plateau. While measurements were carried out, the airfield was not built due to financial constraints caused by an earlier economic depression and build-up of debt. However, shortly after the German Anschluss in 1938, plans of the airfield recommenced. Although land ownership had to be relinquished for the construction of the airfield, there was considerable understanding among the local population. On 13 May 1938, a large-scale ceremony was held and Hermann Göring, Commander-in-Chief of the Luftwaffe, broke ground for the construction of Markersdorf Airfield. In early summer 1938, construction of the airfield began with a total area of 640 hectares. Extensive facilities were built, which included hangars, workshops, a maintenance depot, boiler houses, vehicle halls, and a barracks was built which housed a number of administrative, aviation and support facilities. Initially, the barracks was used for construction management and the housing of workers, and a new high-voltage power line to provide future energy supply was also installed. Water supply was provided through independent series of waterworks and a cistern, while drainage and wastewater disposal were handled through a treatment plant and a large sewage canal leading to the Pielach River. Up to 1,500 workers were active during construction. The landing ground, located south of the barracks complex, was levelled and reinforced with turf, and only the area in front of the hangars was concreted and illuminated at night.

=== Operations ===
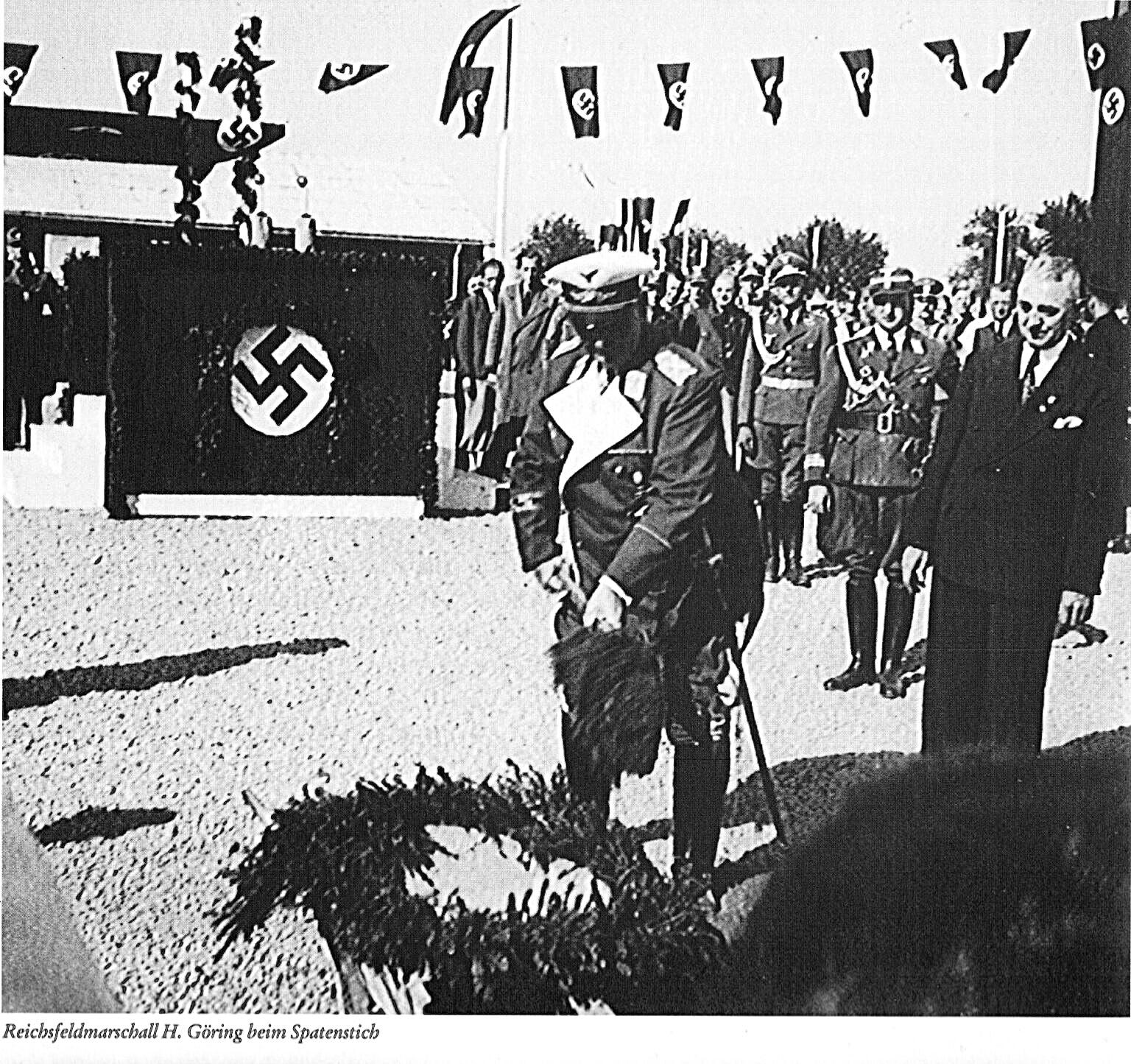
Hermann Göring at the groundbreaking ceremony for Markersdorf Airfield, 13 May 1938.

After construction was completed, on 12 March 1938, Markersdorf Airfield was opened. On 1 July 1938, the Air District Command XVII was established and managed Markersdorf Airfield. Agriculture played a role in operations of the airfield. Prisoners of wars were sent to replace local farmers who had been conscripted. Additionally, an Angora rabbit breeding facility was also operated, providing pelts used to line pilot clothing. Annually, about 200 sheep were brought onto the landing ground to graze and compact the surface. Among the extensive facilities was a gliding school, with an attendance of 60 trainee pilots who housed themselves in Hafnerbach after the war. Personnel usually spent their free time within the barracks area, as it provided entertainment from an on-site cinema, casino, sports field, and a parachute training school. Sports was commonly played at the base, with Luftwaffe sports association LSV Markersdorf promoted to the Donau-Alpenland regional league in the 1942/43 season. One of the players from the club, Max Merkel, later became a well-known football coach. Every Wehrmacht Day, Markersdorf Airfield would open for public, and visitors were allowed to view the landing ground. Stew would also be served for lunch, and a base music band provided musical entertainment.

=== World War II ===
During World War II, Markersdorf Airfield primarily operated as a training base for the Luftwaffe. In addition, it was used as a. Reset, recovery, and replenishment center for operational units returning from the fronts. While aircraft were repaired and maintained at the maintenance depot, combat pilots could rest for several days, and vacancies caused by losses would be filled with new pilots. In 1941, a prisoner-of-war camp consisting of five barracks was established in the western part of the airfield. During the airfield's peak, up to 3,000 personnel were assigned to the base. Civilian staff mainly worked in the maintenance depot, the workshops, and the administrative offices. In the factory kitchen, a North German chief was in charge, and radio operations were led by a woman from Mitterau holding an officer's rank. In May 1944, Wiener Neustädter Flugzeugwerke transferred the final assembly of Messerschmitt Bf 109 aircraft to the airfield when the area became targets of Allied air raids. Subsequently, one of the hangars was converted into a production hall, and facilities for aligning and test-firing the aircraft's onboard weapons were also built.

However, due to the new role of Markersdorf Airfield, it was subjected to heavy Allied bombings in 1944. On 8 July 1944, 81 Consolidated B-24 Liberators of the Fifteenth Air Force (15th AF) flew a mission against the airfield, destroying 30 aircraft on the ground, and heavily damaging the smaller hangars and administrative building. On 26 July 1944, 41 B-24s flew a mission against the airfield, destroying 4 aircraft on the ground, damaging the barracks and leaving craters in the landing ground. On 23 August 1944, 133 B-24s of the 15th AF destroyed 15 aircraft on the ground, and damaged the hangars and barracks. On 20 April 1945, an extensive amount of facilities was demolished to prevent Allied use, and the airfield was evacuated. The remaining facilities were further demolished by advancing Red Army forces. On 8 May 1945, the war in Austria ended following the surrender of Nazi Germany. Following abandonment, the airfield was never reused for aviation purposes and the landing ground was cultivated for agriculture, while the site of the former barracks was partially absorbed by the expanding town of Markersdorf. By 1951, the ruins of the barracks still remained, while the concrete apron and taxiways remained partly damaged. During the Soviet occupation of Austria, the airfield never saw usage by the Soviet Air Force, and was not even used temporarily by any aircraft.

== Present ==
Today, the former extensive concrete road network where the factories were housed still exists, presently used as an access road. Every year, a cycling race called the Fliegerhorst Grand Prix is held on the former roads. Southwest of Markersdorf are the concrete remains of the former bullet stop of the shooting range, which still exists today.

== Facilities ==
Markersdorf Airfield primarily operated two concrete aprons, one western apron with three hangars and a large maintenance hangar and one eastern apron with two hangars. Administrative facilities included, an Officers' mess, drinking water cistern, two enlisted men's quarters, dining hall, and a hospital. Aviation facilities included a flight operations center, aircraft maintenance depot, and a compass compensation circle. Support facilities included a fire station, vehicle garages, fuel storage depot, and an ammunition bunker. Other facilities included a prison-of-war camp, two rabbit breeding facilities, sports field, paratrooper training area, and Gate 1 which served as the main entrance and guardhouse. The aircraft maintenance depot was positioned on the western apron, while the flight operations building and fire station was located in between the two aprons overlooking the airfield. The area of the airfield amounted up to 640 hectares, while the actual barracks encompassed 60 hectares.

== Units ==
The following units that were based at Markersdorf Airfield at one point:

Luftwaffe (Operational Units)

- II./Zerstörergeschwader 76, June—August 1939
- III./Sturzkampfgeschwader 2, May—June 1942
- I./Jagdgeschwader 27, August 1943
- I./Schlachtgeschwader 3, November 1943 – January 1944
- 10. (Panzer) / Schlachtgeschwader 77, March 1944
- III./Schlachtgeschwader 10, May — June 1944
- Elements of Schlachtgeschwader 10, March–April 1945
- 102nd Hungarian Ground-Attack Group, April 1945

Luftwaffe (School Units)

- Schule / Flieger-Ausbildungs-Regiment 72, 1940 – May 1944
- Fliegerführerschule A/B 72 then Fliegerführerschule A 72, 1940 – May 1944
- Headquarters, I./Jagdgeschwader 107, May 1944
- Headquarters and I./Jagdgeschwader 105, June 1944 – April 1945
- Elements of II./Jagdgeschwader 108, June — November–December 1944

Luftwaffe (Station Commands)

- Fliegerhorst-Kommandantur A 11 / XVII, January 1943 – March 1944
- 7. / XVII, April 1944 – April 1945

Station Commanders (prior to the establishment of a station command)

- Major Karl Schaedel, February 1940
- Albrecht von Küster, September 1940 – 9 January 1945?
- Oberstleutnant Mark
- Oberst Werner Wagener, 5 September 1941

Station Units

- Werft-Kompanie 41
- Werft-Abteilung (o) 7 / XVII
