= 1951 Zentropa Cup =

Tournament details
- Dates: 3 July – 5 July 1951
- Teams: 4

Final positions
- Champions: (Austria) Rapid Wien (2nd title)
- Runners-up: (Austria) Admira Wien

Tournament statistics
- Matches played: 8
- Goals scored: 17 (2.13 per match)

The 1951 Zentropa Cup re-emerged after World War Two, the first such premier international football competition since 1940. It was won by the Austrian team Rapid Wien.

== Participants ==
Nation	Club	
Austria	Rapid Wien	Champions
Austria	Admira Wien	Runners-up
Italy	Lazio	4th place
Yugoslavia	Dinamo Zagreb	Cup winners

== Semi-finals ==
July 3, 1951, Praterstadion, Vienna

Team 1	Score	Team 2
Admira Wien (Austria)	4–1	(Socialist Federal Republic of Yugoslavia) Dinamo Zagreb
Rapid Wien (Austria)	5–0	(Italy) Lazio

== 3rd place game ==
July 5, 1951, Praterstadion, Vienna

Team 1	Score	Team 2
Dinamo Zagreb (Socialist Federal Republic of Yugoslavia)	2–0	(Italy) Lazio

== Final ==
July 5, 1951, Praterstadion, Vienna

Team 1	Score	Team 2
Rapid Wien (Austria)	3–2	(Austria) Admira Wien

1951 Zentropa Cup Champions

Rapid Wien
2nd Title

== See also ==
- 1955–56 European Cup
