= Kurt Linder =

German footballer and manager (1933–2022)

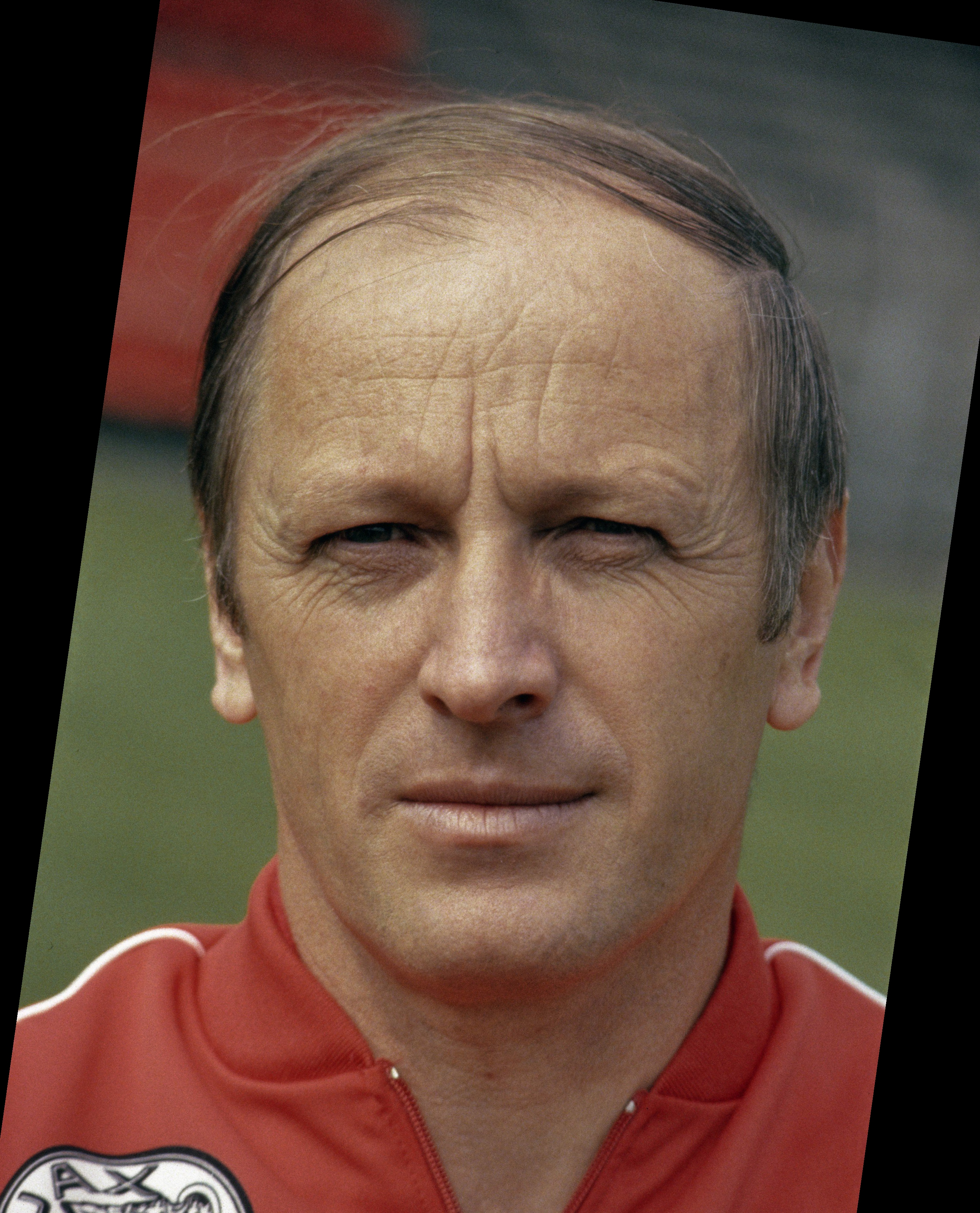
- Linder as Ajax manager in 1981

Personal information
- Date of birth: 8 October 1933
- Place of birth: Karlsruhe, Gau Baden, Germany
- Date of death: 12 December 2022 (aged 89)
- Place of death: Muri bei Bern, Switzerland
- Position: Striker

Senior career*
Years	Team	Apps	(Gls)
1955–1956	Karlsruher SC	9	(2)
1956–1957	Young Boys	16	(12)
1957–1959	Urania Genève Sport	42	(11)
1959–1960	Rapid Wien	9	(5)
1960–1962	Rot-Weiss Essen	26	(7)
1962–1963	Lyon	17	(1)
1965–1966	Lausanne-Sport	1	(0)
Total		120	(38)

Managerial career
- 1965–1966: Lausanne-Sport
- 1966–1968: XerxesDZB
- 1968–1972: PSV Eindhoven
- 1972–1973: Marseille
- 1973–1977: Young Boys
- 1981–1982: Ajax
- 1983: Young Boys
- 1988: Ajax
- * Club domestic league appearances and goals

Kurt Linder (8 October 1933 – 12 December 2022) was a German professional football manager and player. He played for Young Boys, Rapid Wien, Rot-Weiss Essen and Lyon, among other teams.

After his playing career, Linder became a professional manager in Switzerland with Lausanne-Sport and Young Boys, in Netherlands with XerxesDZB, PSV Eindhoven and Ajax, and in France with Marseille.

As a player he won the league titles of Switzerland and Austria with Young Boys and Rapid Wien respectively, while as a manager Linder won the Swiss Cup and Swiss League Cup with Young Boys and the Eredivisie with Ajax in the 1981-82 season with 117 goals for and 42 goals against in 34 matches, with players like Keje Molenaar, Frank Rijkaard, Sonny Silooy, Gerald Vanenburg, Johan Cruijff, Soren Lerby, Tscheu La Ling, Wim Kieft, Jesper Olsen, Marco van Basten and John van 't Schip.

Linder died on 12 December 2022, at the age of 89.

== Honours ==
=== Player ===
Young Boys

- Swiss Super League: 1956–57

Rapid Wien

- Austrian Staatsliga: 1959–60

=== Manager ===
Young Boys

- Swiss Cup: 1976–77
- Swiss League Cup: 1976

Ajax

- Eredivisie: 1981–82

== Bibliography ==
- Barreaud, Marc (1998). Dictionnaire des footballeurs étrangers du championnat professionnel français (1932–1997). L'Harmattan, Paris. ISBN 2-7384-6608-7.
