= Serafim Baptista =

Portuguese footballer (1925–2011)

Personal information
- Full name: Serafim Pereira Baptista
- Date of birth: 21 May 1925
- Place of birth: Portugal
- Date of death: 15 June 2011 (aged 86)
- Position: Midfielder

Senior career*
Years	Team	Apps	(Gls)
1949–1954	Boavista		

International career
1950–1953	Portugal	6	(0)
- * Club domestic league appearances and goals

Serafim Pereira Baptista (21 May 1925 – 15 June 2011) was a Portuguese footballer who played as midfielder.
