= Edeltraud Hanappi-Egger =

Austrian academic (born 1964)

Edeltraud Hanappi-Egger (born 1964) is an Austrian academic. She was the first female professor for Gender and Diversity in Organizations of Vienna University of Economics and Business (WU).

== Early life ==
Hanappi-Egger was educated at Vienna University of Technology, where she received a PhD in computer science. While working towards her PhD, she studied in Canada and Sweden. After graduating, she joined Vienna University of Technology.

== Career ==
From 2002 to 2004, Hanappi-Egger was a guest lecturer at Vienna University of Economics and Business (WU). She became a professor in 2004, when she took over the Institute for Gender and Diversity in Organizations. From 2006 to 2009, she served as the Chair of the Senate at WU, and was also a member of the university board at Graz University of Technology from 2008 to 2013. In addition, she also chaired the Department of Management at WU from 2012 to 2014.

Hanappi-Egger was a guest lecturer at internationally renowned research institutions, such as the London School of Economics and Business, as well as McGill University. She published more than 350 articles on Gender and Diversity, as well as Diversity Management and Organizational Management.

She was elected first female Rector of WU in January 2015 succeeding Christoph Badelt. In June 2018 she has been re-elected for a second consecutive period

== Personal life ==
Hanappi-Egger is married to Gerhard Hanappi, a professor at Vienna University of Technology. They have one child.
