= Hardy Hanappi =

Austrian economist (born 1951)

- Born: December 4, 1951 (age 74); Vienna, Austria

Academic background
- Influences: Georg Wilhelm Friedrich Hegel, Karl Marx, Joseph Alois Schumpeter, John von Neumann

Academic work
- Discipline: Political economy, Simulation, Game theory
- School or tradition: Classical Political Economy

Hardy (Gerhard) Hanappi (born December 4, 1951), son of Gerhard Hanappi, is a European political economist. He is ad personam Jean Monnet Chair for Political Economy of European Integration and professor at the Institute of Statistics and Mathematical Methods in Economics of the TU Wien.

== Career ==
Previously, he was deputy head of Socioeconomics at the Austrian Academy of Sciences, and director of the Ludwig Boltzmann Institute for Monetary Economics (LB-Society Vienna). He was Research Fellow at the International Centre of Electronic Commerce (ICEC, Seoul, Korea) and professorial research associate at the SOAS, University of London. In 2010 he founded the Vienna Institute for Political Economy Research (VIPER). Hanappi has served as scientific development officer in the board of the European Association for Evolutionary Political Economy (EAEPE) from 2004 to 2017. He also was member of the board of the International Joseph A. Schumpeter Society and of the extended board of the Verein für Socialpolitik. Since 2003 he holds a Jean Monnet Chair granted by the European Commission.

== Editing activities ==
Hardy Hanappi published and edited several books and numerous articles, has been a member of the editorial board of several journals, such as the Journal of Evolutionary Economics (JEE, Germany), the Evolutionary and Institutional Economics Review (EIER, Japan), and the Forum for Social Economics (FSE, USA).

== Intellectual influences ==
His work combines interpretations of Hegelian, Marxian, and Schumpeterean ideas and aims at the construction of (partially game-theoretic) simulations for contemporary issues in global political economy to inform policy making. His work on the European unification process is paralleled by a strong interest in methodological questions. His most recent research interest concerns the development of quantum political economy. He is married to professor Edeltraud Hanappi-Egger, has three children and lives in Vienna.

== Selected works ==
- Hanappi, Gerhard (1989). Die Entwicklung des Kapitalismus. Gibt es lange Wellen der Konjunktur?. Frankfurt a. M.P: Peter Lang Verlag. ISBN 9783631407905. Archived from the original on 2019-08-23.*Evolutionary Economics. The Evolutionary Revolution in the Social Sciences. Aldershot: Avebury Publishers. 1994. ISBN 1-85628-947-8. OCLC 30892305.
- Advances in Evolutionary Institutional Economics, (with Wolfram Elsner) Edward Elgar, 2008, ISBN 978-1-84720-908-5
- Varieties of Capitalism and New Institutional Deals Regulation, Welfare and the New Economy, (with Wolfram Elsner) Edward Elgar, 2008, ISBN 978 1 84720 473 8
- South-East Europe in Evolution, Routledge, 2015, ISBN 978-0-415-52425-4
- Society and Economics in Europe, (with Savvas Katsikides), 2016, Springer, ISBN 978-3-319-21430-6
- Evolutionary Political Economy in Action, (with Savvas Katsikides and Manuel Scholz-Wäckerle), Routledge, 2017, ISBN 978-1-138-20411-9
