= Franz Riegler (footballer, born 1915) =

Austrian footballer

Personal information
- Full name: Franz Riegler
- Date of birth: 26 August 1915
- Place of birth: Vienna, Austrian Empire
- Date of death: January 1989 (aged 73)
- Place of death: Austria
- Position: Outside right

Senior career*
Years	Team	Apps	(Gls)
1933–1935	FC Wien		
1936–1938	Austria Wien		
1939–1950	FC Wien		

International career
1936–1945	Austria	3	(0)
- * Club domestic league appearances and goals

Franz Riegler (26 August 1915 – early January 1989), nicknamed Bobby, was an Austrian footballer who played as an outside right and made three appearances for the Austria national team. He was also known as Franz Riegler I to distinguish him from his compatriot Franz Riegler II of the same era.

== Career ==
Riegler made his international debut for Austria on 27 September 1936 in the 1936–38 Central European International Cup against Hungary, which finished as a 3–5 loss in Budapest. He went on to make three appearances, earning his final cap on 6 December 1945 in a friendly match against France, which finished as a 4–1 win in Vienna.

== Personal life ==
Riegler was born on 26 August 1915 in Vienna. His younger brother, Johann "Hans" Riegler, was also an Austrian international footballer who was included in the country's 1954 World Cup squad. Franz died in early January 1989 at the age of 73, and was buried at the Vienna Central Cemetery on 6 February 1989.

== Career statistics ==
=== International ===
Austria
Year	Apps	Goals
1936	1	0
1937	1	0
1945	1	0
Total	3	0
