= Artur Vaz =

Portuguese footballer

Personal information
- Full name: Artur Paulo Assunção Vaz
- Date of birth: 3 April 1925
- Place of birth: Portugal
- Date of death: 30 July 2009 (aged 84)
- Position: Defender

Senior career*
Years	Team	Apps	(Gls)
- Vitória Setúbal

International career
1953–1954	Portugal	3	(0)
- * Club domestic league appearances and goals

Artur Paulo Assunção Vaz (3 April 1925 – 30 July 2009) was a Portuguese footballer who played as defender.

Artur Vaz gained three caps for Portugal and made his international debut on 21 November 1953 in Lisbon against South Africa in a 3-1 win.
