= Carlos Gomes (footballer, born 1932) =

Portuguese footballer and manager

Personal information
- Full name: Carlos António do Carmo Costa Gomes
- Date of birth: 18 January 1932
- Place of birth: Barreiro, Portugal
- Date of death: 18 October 2005 (aged 73)
- Place of death: Lisbon, Portugal
- Height: 1.84 m (6 ft 0 in)
- Position: Goalkeeper

Youth career
- Barreirense

Senior career*
Years	Team	Apps	(Gls)
1949–1950	Barreirense	-	(-)
1950–1958	Sporting CP	178	(0)
1958–1959	Granada	27	(0)
1959–1961	Real Oviedo	42	(0)
1961–1962	Atlético CP	4	(0)
1962–1963	Tangier CF		
1963–1965	USP Tanger		
1965–1969	COD Meknes		
1969–1970	JS Djijel		

International career
1953–1958	Portugal	18	(0)

Managerial career
- 1969–1970: JS Djijel
- 1970–1971: MC Oran
- 1971–1972: USM Khenchela
- * Club domestic league appearances and goals

Carlos António do Carmo Costa Gomes (18 January 1932, in Barreiro – 18 October 2005, in Lisbon) was a Portuguese footballer who played as a goalkeeper. He was also a football manager.

== Career ==
He started his career in Barreirense, before being transferred to Sporting, in 1950, aged 18, where he was the substitute of another legendary goalkeeper, João Azevedo. In just a year, he was the number 1 of the Sporting team, where he played until 1957/58, and was a four-time national champion (1951/52, 1952/53, 1953/54 and 1957/58) also winning the Cup of Portugal in 1958.

During the golden years of his career, he played 18 times for the National Team. His first game, on 22 November 1953, was a friendly match against South Africa, which Portugal won 3–1. His last game, on 7 May 1958, was a 1–2 defeat by England; another friendly match.

After his demands were refused by Sporting, he moved to Spain, where he represented Granada and Real Oviedo. He returned to Portugal, to play for Atlético, in 1961/62. He was a known opponent of the fascist regime and it is believed, like he claimed, that the allegations of rape against him were a set-up, created by the political police of the regime to force him to leave football. After a simulated injury in an Atlético game with Vitória Guimarães, he escaped to Spain. Later, he escaped to Morocco and played with Tangier FC, USP Tangier and CODM Meknès.

In 1969, he went to Algeria, played with JS Djijel and became a manager. In 1971, he managed MC Oran and won the championship. He went to Tunisia before returning to Portugal in the 1980s.

He moved again to Spain and Austria, returning finally to Portugal in July 2005, suffering from Parkinson's disease. He died soon after, at age 73.

== Honours ==
- Won the Portuguese Primeira Liga for 4 times in 1952, 1953, 1954 and 1958 with Sporting Clube de Portugal.
- Won the Taça de Portugal once in 1954 with Sporting Clube de Portugal.
- Won the Moroccan Throne Cup once in 1966 with COD Meknes
- Won the Algerian Ligue 1 once in 1971 with MC Oran (as manager).
