= 1950–51 Austrian football championship =

33rd season of top-tier football league in Austria

Austrian football championship
- Season: 1950–51

Statistics of Austrian Staatsliga A in the 1950–51 season.

== Overview ==
It was contested by 13 teams, and SK Rapid Wien won the championship.

== League standings ==
Pos	Team	Pld	W	D	L	GF	GA	GD	Pts
1	SK Rapid Wien	24	20	3	1	133	40	+93	43
2	SC Wacker	24	18	2	4	100	38	+62	38
3	FK Austria Wien	24	14	4	6	89	49	+40	32
4	Wiener Sportclub	24	11	5	8	73	52	+21	27
5	First Vienna FC	24	10	6	8	56	58	−2	26
6	FC Wien	24	10	5	9	45	50	−5	25
7	SK Sturm Graz	24	8	7	9	48	74	−26	23
8	SK Admira Wien	24	8	5	11	66	50	+16	21
9	Floridsdorfer AC	24	7	6	11	53	72	−19	20
10	Linzer ASK	24	7	5	12	25	62	−37	19
11	SK Vorwärts Steyr	24	7	2	15	34	64	−30	16
12	1. Wiener Neustädter SC	24	6	3	15	45	74	−29	15
13	FS Elektra	24	3	1	20	31	115	−84	7

Source: rsssf.com

== Results ==
Home \ Away	ADM	AWI	ELE	FIR	FLO	FCW	LIN	RWI	STI	VOR	WAK	WNE	WIN
Admira Wien		2–4	14–1	2–5	2–2	0–2	2–0	0–1	7–2	1–2	0–2	5–3	0–0
Austria Wien	0–4		9–3	2–1	5–0	0–0	11–3	5–7	1–1	5–3	2–3	5–0	3–1
Elektra	1–7	2–6		2–7	1–4	1–2	2–1	1–5	2–4	1–2	0–7	1–1	1–7
First Vienna	4–4	3–2	5–1		1–1	0–2	3–0	0–9	2–3	1–2	3–1	1–0	2–2
Floridsdorfer AC	3–3	2–4	2–1	2–3		5–4	4–1	2–8	1–3	2–4	1–5	2–1	2–2
FC Wien	3–1	0–4	3–2	1–1	1–2		1–1	2–3	3–1	3–0	1–5	3–1	0–1
Linzer ASK	1–0	0–0	1–0	1–1	1–0	0–4		2–1	3–0	1–1	0–4	1–0	1–2
Rapid Wien	3–1	3–1	11–0	5–2	5–2	8–0	11–2		12–1	5–1	3–3	7–1	2–2
Sturm Graz	2–2	3–2	0–2	3–3	1–1	5–4	1–1	3–3		1–0	1–6	9–0	2–2
Vorwärts Steyr	1–5	1–4	3–0	0–3	2–3	1–1	1–2	1–6	1–2		2–0	2–3	0–2
Wacker Wien	5–1	3–3	8–1	4–1	6–4	7–1	6–0	3–4	5–0	3–4		5–2	3–2
Wiener Neustädter SC	3–1	1–6	2–4	2–3	1–1	1–1	3–0	2–5	6–0	6–0	0–1		6–1
Wiener SC	0–2	3–5	4–1	7–1	7–5	0–3	4–2	3–6	5–0	4–0	2–5	10–0	

Legend: Blue = home team win; Yellow = draw; Red = away team win.
