= 1959–60 Austrian football championship =

42nd season of top-tier football league in Austria

Austrian football championship
- Season: 1959–60
- Champions: Rapid Wien

The 1959–60 Austrian Staatsliga A was the 49th edition of top flight football in Austria.

== Overview ==
It was contested by 14 teams, and Rapid Wien won the championship.

== League standings ==
Pos	Team	Pld	W	D	L	GF	GA	GD	Pts
1	SK Rapid Wien	26	18	6	2	87	32	+55	42
2	Wiener Sportclub	26	17	4	5	71	35	+36	38
3	Wiener AC	26	17	4	5	74	43	+31	38
4	First Vienna FC	26	17	4	5	81	50	+31	38
5	FK Austria Wien	26	12	6	8	67	49	+18	30
6	1. Simmeringer SC	26	11	6	9	51	49	+2	28
7	Linzer ASK	26	9	8	9	54	57	−3	26
8	SC Wacker	26	7	6	13	47	57	−10	20
9	1. Wiener Neustädter SC	26	6	8	12	49	79	−30	20
10	Grazer AK	26	7	5	14	45	55	−10	19
11	SV Austria Salzburg	26	5	9	12	42	67	−25	19
12	Kremser SC	26	6	6	14	44	65	−21	18
13	WSV Donawitz	26	7	3	16	39	73	−34	17
14	SK Admira Wien	26	3	5	18	31	71	−40	11

Source: rsssf.com

== Results ==
Home \ Away	ADM	ASZ	AWI	DON	FIR	GAK	KRE	LIN	RWI	SIM	WAK	WAC	WNE	WIE
Admira Wien		0–3	2–1	1–2	1–4	1–2	3–0	1–2	2–3	2–2	0–0	1–4	4–4	2–2
Austria Salzburg	2–2		2–2	3–1	1–2	3–3	2–0	0–0	1–6	1–1	3–2	2–7	2–0	1–4
Austria Wien	7–0	3–1		5–0	2–3	4–3	5–3	4–1	1–3	2–2	1–6	2–4	4–0	1–4
Donawitz	2–1	3–2	1–1		2–4	3–2	1–1	5–1	0–2	1–2	3–1	0–1	2–6	0–1
First Vienna	4–0	7–1	3–2	6–1		4–0	3–1	3–1	2–2	4–2	4–1	3–1	3–1	1–2
Grazer AK	2–0	5–1	1–1	3–1	2–3		2–0	2–4	0–1	1–2	3–1	2–2	4–1	0–2
Kremser SC	2–0	0–2	1–4	1–1	2–2	1–1		1–2	2–2	2–0	4–3	1–2	2–3	0–2
Linzer ASK	3–0	3–3	1–1	2–1	2–2	3–1	5–4		1–1	4–0	1–4	1–2	1–1	2–3
Rapid Wien	3–1	2–2	1–2	5–0	4–1	4–2	7–1	5–1		4–0	5–0	3–4	5–1	6–1
Simmeringer SC	0–2	1–1	1–0	7–1	6–3	5–2	2–1	3–6	2–2		1–0	2–5	4–0	2–0
Wacker Wien	5–2	4–2	2–3	3–2	2–2	2–0	2–4	3–3	1–3	1–0		0–1	1–1	1–3
Wiener AC	3–1	7–2	1–2	6–1	6–2	2–1	2–2	3–1	1–2	1–1	4–0		4–4	2–3
Wiener Neustädter SC	2–1	1–1	1–2	6–2	4–3	1–1	2–3	3–3	1–4	3–2	1–1	1–2		5–2
Wiener SC	7–1	2–0	2–2	5–0	1–3	3–0	5–1	1–0	2–2	0–1	1–1	4–1	9–0	

Legend: Blue = home team win; Yellow = draw; Red = away team win.
