= Franz Riegler (footballer, born 1922) =

Austrian footballer

Personal information
- Full name: Franz Riegler
- Date of birth: 3 February 1922
- Place of birth: Austria
- Date of death: 15 February 1945 (aged 23)
- Place of death: Vienna, Nazi Germany
- Positions: Inside right; outside right

Senior career*
| Years | Team | Apps | (Gls) |
| 1939–1943 | Austria Wien | | |
| 1943–1944 | LSV Markersdorf/Pielach | | |

International career
| 1941–1942 | Germany | 2 | (0) |
- * Club domestic league appearances and goals

Franz Riegler (3 February 1922 – 15 February 1945) was an Austrian footballer who played as a forward and made two appearances for the Germany national team. He was also known as Franz Riegler II to distinguish him from his compatriot Franz "Bobby" Riegler of the same era.

== Career ==
Riegler was able to represent Germany internationally following the Anschluss. He made his debut on 7 December 1941 in a friendly match against Slovakia, which finished as a 4–0 win for Germany. He earned his second and final cap on 18 January 1942 in a friendly against Croatia, which finished as a 2–0 win.

== Personal life ==
During World War II, Riegler served in the Wehrmacht within Austria and in the Netherlands during 1942-43 until he was discharged after serving time in military prison at Germersheim, Germany. Riegler died in an Allied bombing raid on 15 February 1945 in Vienna at the age of 23, and was buried on 23 February 1945 in the Großjedlersdorf cemetery in the same city.

== Career statistics ==
=== International ===
Germany
| Year | Apps | Goals |
|---|---|---|
| 1941 | 1 | 0 |
| 1942 | 1 | 0 |
| Total | 2 | 0 |
