= Sándor Lenkei =

Hungarian footballer

Personal information
- Date of birth: 9 November 1936
- Date of death: 20 June 2003 (aged 66)

International career
Years	Team	Apps	(Gls)
1957	Hungary	4	(0)

Sándor Lenkei (9 November 1936 – 20 June 2003) was a Hungarian footballer. He played in four matches for the Hungary national football team in 1957.
