= Erich Probst =

Austrian footballer

Personal information
- Full name: Erich Probst
- Date of birth: 5 December 1927
- Place of birth: Vienna, Austria
- Date of death: 16 March 1988 (aged 60)
- Position: Striker

Senior career*
Years	Team	Apps	(Gls)
1945–1949	Admira Wien	81	(89)
1950	First Vienna	3	(3)
1950–1956	Rapid Wien	112	(107)
1956–1958	Wuppertaler SV	50	(43)
1958–1959	FC Zürich	11	(6)
1959–1960	Austria Salzburg	9	(8)
1960–1962	ASK Salzburg	39	(37)
1962–1963	First Vienna	5	(6)
Total		310	(299)

International career
1951–1960	Austria	19	(18)
Medal record
Representing Austria
FIFA World Cup
Third place	1954 Switzerland
- * Club domestic league appearances and goals

Erich Probst (5 December 1927 – 16 March 1988) was an Austrian footballer who played as a striker.

== International career ==
Probst made his debut for Austria in a May 1951 friendly match against Scotland and was a participant at the 1954 FIFA World Cup tournament 1954 in Switzerland, where he was one of the foremost strikers. Austria reached third place and Probst ended second in the scorer list with six goals, behind the Hungarian Sandor Kocsis and jointly with Max Morlock of Germany and the Swiss Josef Hügi.

Probst earned 19 caps, scoring 18 goals. His final international was a March 1960 European Championship qualification match against France.

== Honours ==
Rapid Wien

- Austrian Football Bundesliga (4): 1951, 1952, 1954, 1956
- Zentropa Cup (1): 1951

== International goals ==
No.	Date	Venue	Opponent	Score	Result	Competition
1.	27 September 1953	Vienna, Austria	Portugal	2–0	9–1	1954 FIFA World Cup qualification
2.	27 September 1953	Vienna, Austria	Portugal	3–0	9–1	1954 FIFA World Cup qualification
3.	27 September 1953	Vienna, Austria	Portugal	4–0	9–1	1954 FIFA World Cup qualification
4.	27 September 1953	Vienna, Austria	Portugal	5–0	9–1	1954 FIFA World Cup qualification
5.	27 September 1953	Vienna, Austria	Portugal	7–1	9–1	1954 FIFA World Cup qualification
6.	30 May 1954	Vienna, Austria	Norway	3–0	5–0	Friendly
7.	30 May 1954	Vienna, Austria	Norway	4–0	5–0	Friendly
8.	16 June 1954	Zürich, Switzerland	Scotland	1–0	1–0	1954 FIFA World Cup
9.	19 June 1954	Zürich, Switzerland	Czechoslovakia	2–0	5–0	1954 FIFA World Cup
10.	19 June 1954	Zürich, Switzerland	Czechoslovakia	3–0	5–0	1954 FIFA World Cup
11.	19 June 1954	Zürich, Switzerland	Czechoslovakia	4–0	5–0	1954 FIFA World Cup
12.	26 June 1954	Lausanne, Switzerland	Switzerland	7–5	7–5	1954 FIFA World Cup
13.	30 June 1954	Basel, Switzerland	West Germany	1–2	1–6	1954 FIFA World Cup
14.	27 March 1955	Brno, Czechoslovakia	Czechoslovakia	1–2	2–3	1955–60 Central European International Cup
15.	24 April 1955	Vienna, Austria	Hungary	1–1	2–2	1955–60 Central European International Cup
16.	24 April 1955	Vienna, Austria	Hungary	2–2	2–2	1955–60 Central European International Cup
17.	1 May 1955	Bern, Switzerland	Switzerland	3–2	3–2	1955–60 Central European International Cup
18.	27 March 1960	Vienna, Austria	France	2–2	2–4	1960 European Nations' Cup quarter-finals

== See also ==
- List of FIFA World Cup top goalscorers
