= Max Merkel =

Austrian football player and manager

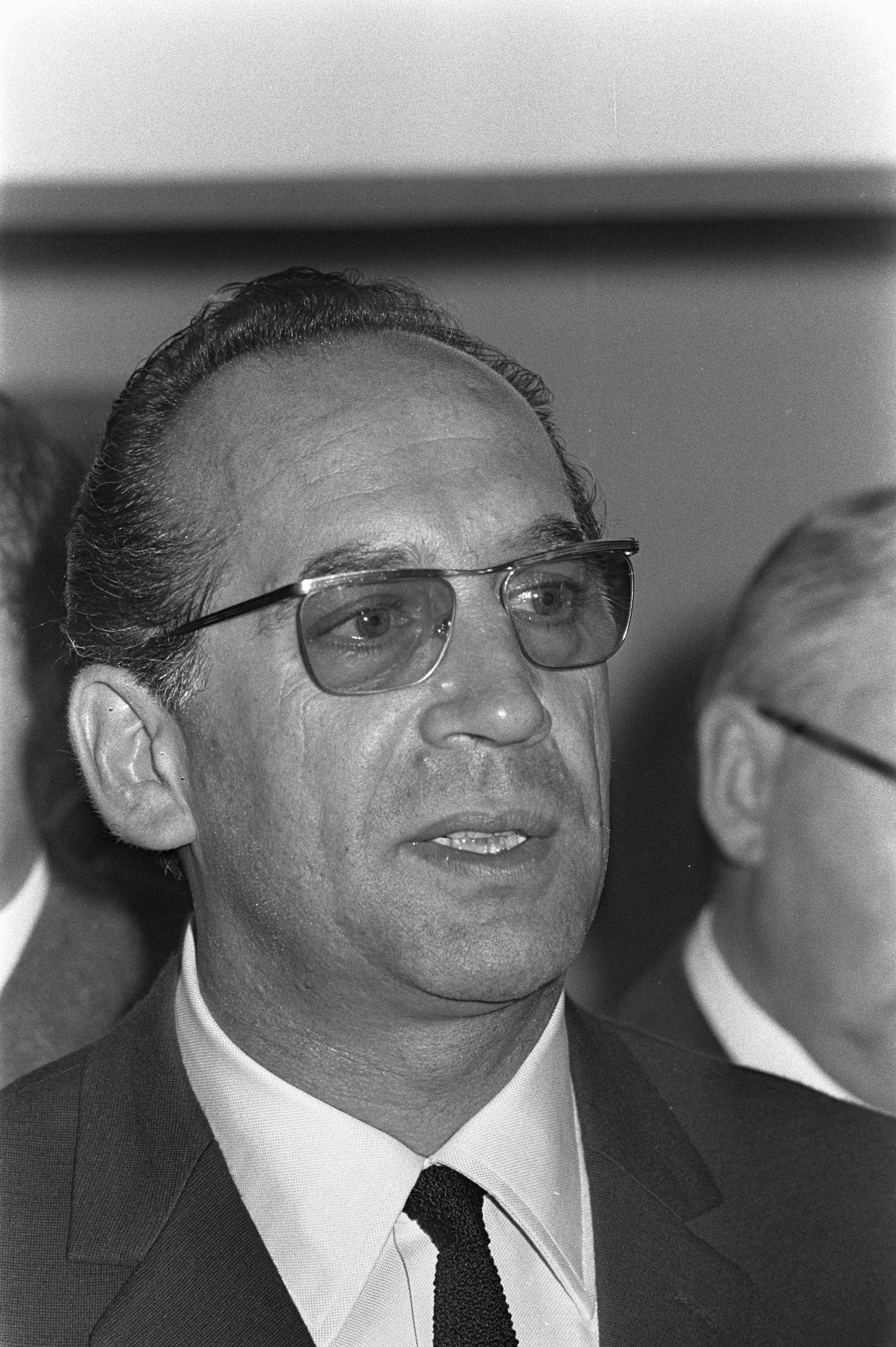
- Merkel in 1968

Personal information
- Date of birth: 7 December 1918
- Place of birth: Vienna, Republic of German-Austria
- Date of death: 28 November 2006 (aged 87)
- Place of death: Putzbrunn, Germany
- Position: Defender

Senior career*
Years	Team	Apps	(Gls)
1936–1937	Rapid Wien	1	(0)
1937–1942	Wiener SC		
1942–1944	Luftwaffen SV Markersdorf		
1945–1946	Wiener SC		
1946–1954	Rapid Wien	145	(7)

International career
1939	Germany	1	(0)
1952	Austria	1	(0)

Managerial career
- 1954–1955: HBS Craeyenhout
- 1955–1956: Netherlands
- 1956–1958: Rapid Wien
- 1958–1961: Borussia Dortmund
- 1961–1966: TSV 1860 Munich
- 1967–1969: 1. FC Nürnberg
- 1969–1971: Sevilla FC
- 1971–1973: Atlético Madrid
- 1974–1975: TSV 1860 Munich
- 1975–1976: FC Schalke 04
- 1976–1977: FC Augsburg
- 1981–1982: Karlsruher SC
- 1983: FC Zürich
- * Club domestic league appearances and goals

Max Merkel (7 December 1918 – 28 November 2006) was an Austrian footballer who played international football for both Germany and Austria as a defender. At club level, he played for Rapid Wien, Wiener SC, and Luftwaffen SV Markersdorf.

== Managerial honours ==
Rapid Wien

- Austrian League: 1956–57

1860 Munich

- Bundesliga: 1965–66
- DFB-Pokal: 1963–64
- European Cup Winners' Cup: Runners-up: 1964–65

1. FC Nürnberg

- Bundesliga: 1967–68

Atlético Madrid

- Copa del Generalísimo: 1971–72
- Spanish League: 1972–73
