= Bruno Mehsarosch =

Austrian footballer

Personal information
- Date of birth: 9 March 1934
- Date of death: 29 December 2009 (aged 75)
- Place of death: Vienna, Austria
- Position: Striker

Senior career*
Years	Team	Apps	(Gls)
1952–1958	SK Rapid Wien	34	(28)
1958–1960	SK Admira Wien		
- * Club domestic league appearances and goals

Bruno Mehsarosch (9 March 1934 – 29 December 2009) was an Austrian footballer.
