= Josef Bertalan =

Austrian footballer

Personal information
- Date of birth: 29 September 1934
- Position: Striker

Senior career*
Years	Team	Apps	(Gls)
–1952	Fischamend		
1952–1963	SK Rapid Wien	145	(37)
1963–1965	1. Simmeringer SC		

International career
1960	Austria	1	(0)
- * Club domestic league appearances and goals

Josef Bertalan (born 29 September 1934) is an Austrian former footballer.
