= Karl Giesser =

Austrian footballer

Personal information
- Date of birth: 29 October 1928
- Place of birth: Austria
- Date of death: 15 January 2010 (aged 81)
- Position: Midfielder

Senior career*
Years	Team	Apps	(Gls)
1949–1964	SK Rapid Wien		

International career
- Austria
Medal record
Representing Austria
FIFA World Cup
Third place	1954 Switzerland
- * Club domestic league appearances and goals

Karl Giesser (29 October 1928 – 15 January 2010) was an Austrian football midfielder who played for Austria in the 1954 FIFA World Cup. He also played for SK Rapid Wien.
