= Robert Körner =

Austrian footballer (1924–1989)

Personal information
- Full name: Robert Körner
- Date of birth: 21 August 1924
- Place of birth: Austria
- Date of death: 22 June 1989 (aged 64)
- Height: 1.76 m (5 ft 9 in)
- Position: Striker

Senior career*
Years	Team	Apps	(Gls)
1942–1958	Rapid Wien	212	(80)

International career
1948–1955	Austria	16	(1)

Managerial career
- 1958–1966: Rapid Wien
- 1966–1967: Waldhof Mannheim
- 1969–1970: Rapid Wien
- 1971–1972: Rapid Wien
- 1975–1976: Rapid Wien
Medal record
Representing Austria
FIFA World Cup
Third place	1954 Switzerland
- * Club domestic league appearances and goals

Robert Körner (21 August 1924 – 22 June 1989) was an Austrian footballer.

== Club career ==
Körner played for and captained SK Rapid Wien, and later managed SK Rapid Wien (four times), SV Waldhof Mannheim (as coach), and 1. FC Nürnberg (as co-trainer).

== International career ==
Körner made his debut for Austria in November 1948 against Sweden and was a participant at the 1954 FIFA World Cup where Austria finished third with his younger brother Alfred. He earned 16 caps, scoring one goal.

== Honours ==
=== Player ===
- Austrian Football Bundesliga: 1946, 1948, 1951, 1952, 1954, 1956, 1957
- Austrian Cup: 1946
- Zentropa Cup: 1951

=== Managerial ===
- Austrian Football Bundesliga: 1960, 1964
- Austrian Cup: 1961, 1972, 1976
