= Johann Riegler =

Austrian footballer (1929–2011)

Personal information
- Date of birth: 17 July 1929
- Place of birth: Vienna, Austria
- Date of death: 31 August 2011 (aged 82)
- Height: 1.76 m (5 ft 9 in)
- Position: Midfielder

Senior career*
Years	Team	Apps	(Gls)
1944–1948	FC Wien	56	(40)
1948–1958	Rapid Wien	218	(130)
1958–1961	Austria Wien	54	(30)
1961–1962	Lens	31	(5)
1962–1963	Austria Klagenfurt	22	(4)
Total		381	(209)

International career
1951–1955	Austria	6	(1)
Medal record
Representing Austria
FIFA World Cup
Third place	1954 Switzerland
- * Club domestic league appearances and goals

Johann Riegler (17 July 1929 – 31 August 2011), nicknamed Hans or Hansi, was an Austrian football midfielder who played for Austria in the 1954 FIFA World Cup. He also played for Rapid Wien, Austria Wien, and Lens.

== Personal life ==
Riegler's older brother, Franz "Bobby" Riegler, was also an Austrian international footballer. Johann died on 31 August 2011 at the age of 82.
