= Alfred Körner =

Austrian footballer (1926–2020)

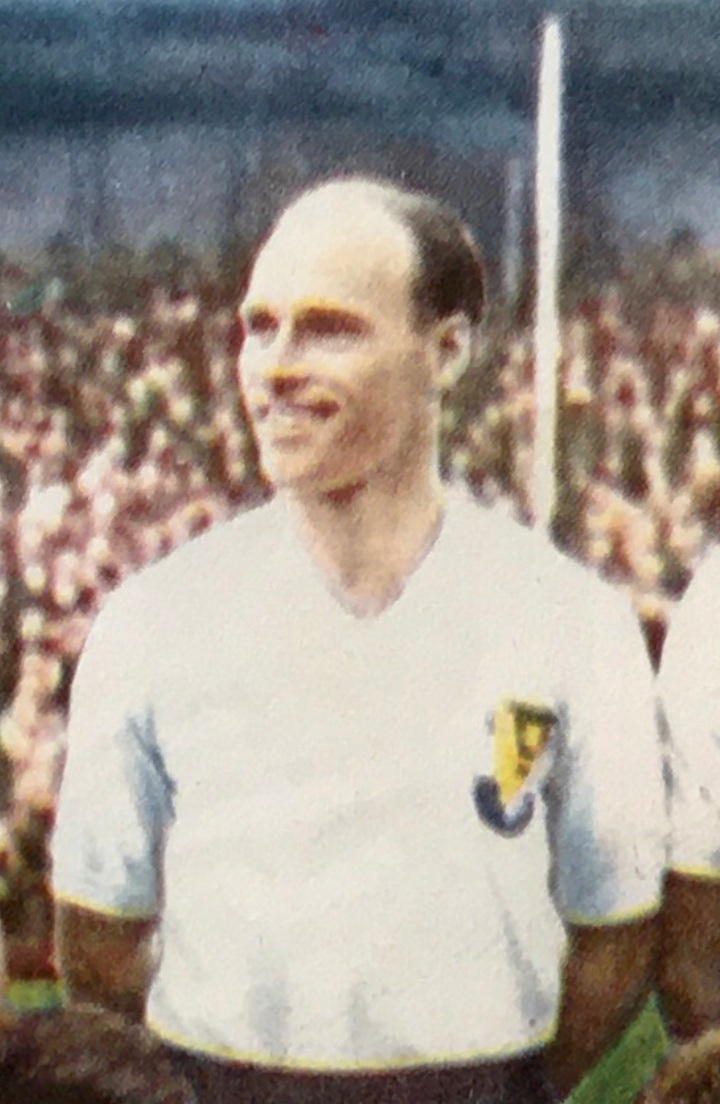
- Körner in 1958

Personal information
- Full name: Alfred Körner
- Date of birth: 14 February 1926
- Place of birth: Vienna, Austria
- Date of death: 23 January 2020 (aged 93)
- Place of death: Vienna
- Position: Striker

Senior career*
Years	Team	Apps	(Gls)
1942–1959	Rapid Wien	286	(157)
1959–1960	Admira Wien	6	(1)
1960–1961	Admira Energie		

International career
1946–1958	Austria	47	(14)

Managerial career
- 1964–1967: First Vienna
Medal record
Representing Austria
FIFA World Cup
Third place	1954 Switzerland
- * Club domestic league appearances and goals

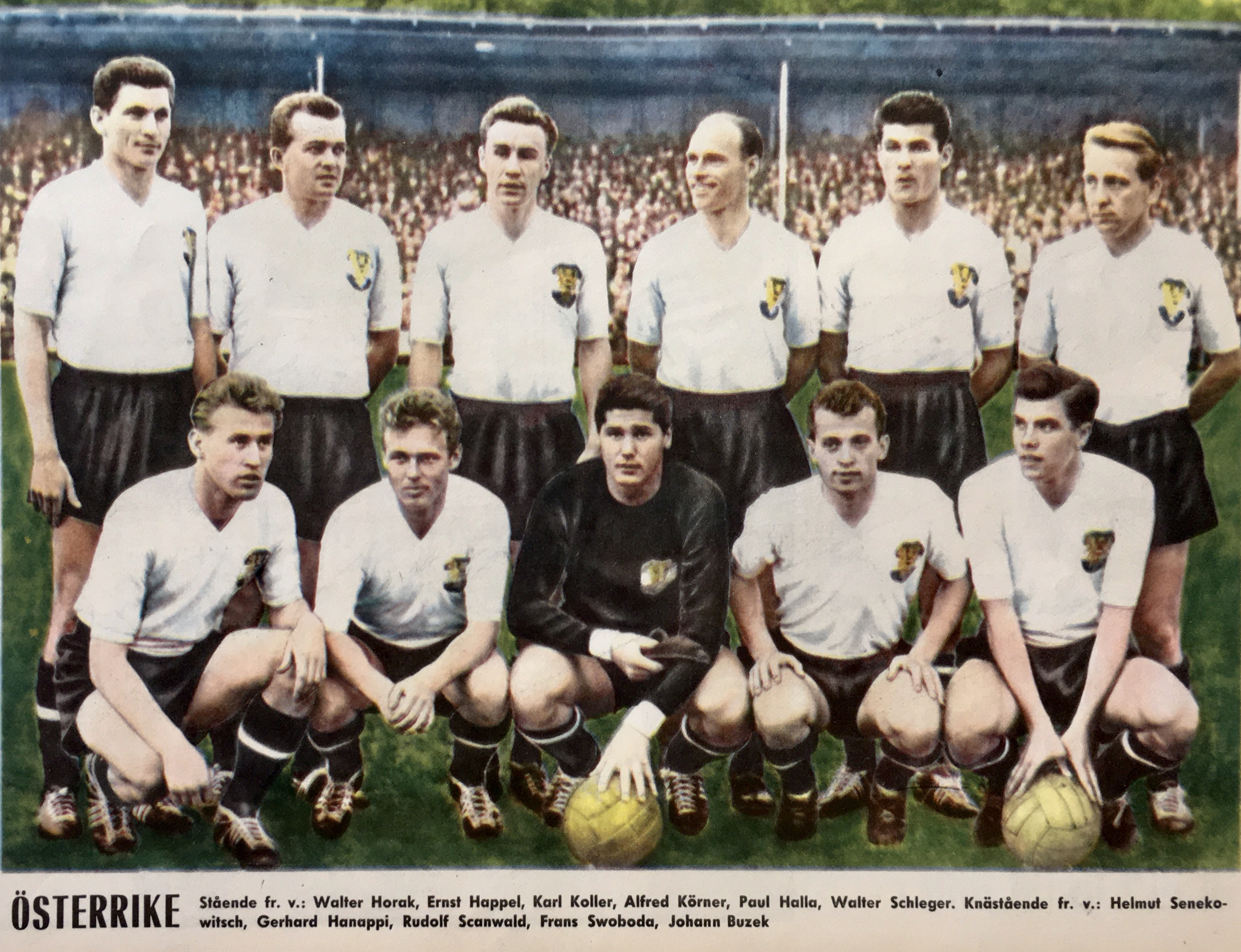
Austria national football team of 1958 with the following players – from left to right, standing; Walter Horak, Ernst Happel, Karl Koller, Alfred Körner, Paul Halla, Walter Schleger; crouched: Helmut Senekowitsch, Gerhard Hanappi, Rudolf Szanwald, Franz Swoboda and Johann Buzek.

Alfred Körner (14 February 1926 – 23 January 2020) was an Austrian footballer. He played for Austria at the 1948 Summer Olympics.

== Club career ==
Körner had a career with SK Rapid Wien and also played for FK Admira Wien (now VfB Admira Wacker Mödling).

== International career ==
Körner made his debut for Austria in an October 1947 friendly match against Czechoslovakia and played in the 1954 FIFA World Cup where Austria finished third with his older brother Robert, and the 1958 FIFA World Cup. He earned 47 caps, scoring 14 goals. His last international was an October 1958 friendly match against France.

== Honours ==
- Austrian Liga (7):
  - 1946, 1948, 1951, 1952, 1954, 1956, 1957
- Austrian Cup (1):
  - 1946
- Zentropa Cup (1):
  - 1951
