= Walter Zeman =

Austrian footballer

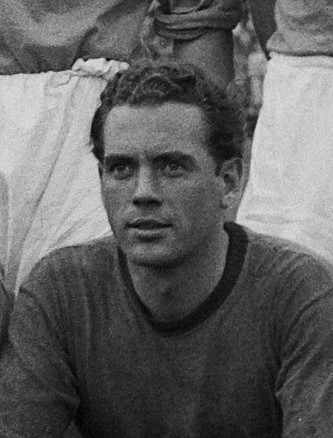
- Zeman in 1953

Personal information
- Full name: Walter Zeman
- Date of birth: May 1, 1927
- Place of birth: Vienna, Austria
- Date of death: August 8, 1991 (aged 64)
- Place of death: Vienna, Austria
- Position: Goalkeeper

Youth career
- Wienerberg
- Vienna

Senior career*
Years	Team	Apps	(Gls)
1942–1944	FC Wien		
1945–1961	SK Rapid Wien	235	(0)
1961–1962	SAK 1914		

International career
1945–1960	Austria	41	(0)
Medal record
Representing Austria
FIFA World Cup
Third place	1954 Switzerland
- * Club domestic league appearances and goals

Walter Zeman (1 May 1927 – 8 August 1991) was an Austrian football goalkeeper and an integral part of the second Austrian Wunderteam of the 1950s.

Zeman began his youth career at local club SV Wienerberger, but he soon moved on to FC Vienna. In 1945 Zeman joined Rapid Vienna and also won his first cap for the Austria national football team. With Rapid, Zeman won eight Austrian league championships, one Austrian Cup, and the 1951 Zentropa Cup.

For the national side Zeman competed at the 1954 FIFA World Cup in which Austria progressed to the semi-finals before being defeated by West Germany. In total Zeman won 41 caps for Austria, and is often regarded as Austria's second greatest keeper after Rudi Hiden. Throughout his career, he earned the nicknames the Tiger of Budapest and the Panther of Glasgow, for his international performances. He was named Austria's Sportsman of the Year in 1950, and was included in the FIFA World XI in 1953.
