= Gerhard Hanappi =

Austrian footballer (1929–1980)

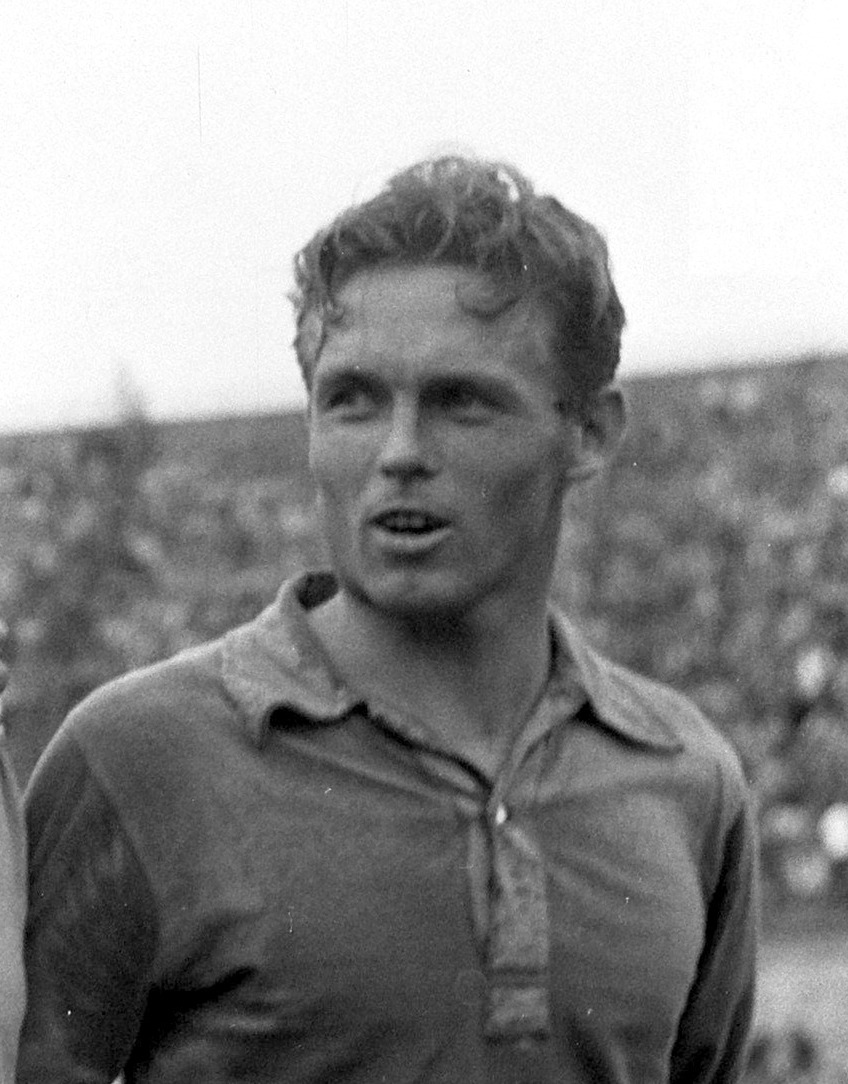
- Hanappi in 1953

Personal information
- Full name: Gerhard Hanappi
- Date of birth: 16 February 1929
- Place of birth: Vienna, Austria
- Date of death: 23 August 1980 (aged 51)
- Place of death: Vienna, Austria
- Height: 1.69 m (5 ft 7 in)
- Position: Midfielder

Youth career
- 1942–1947: SC Wacker Wien

Senior career*
Years	Team	Apps	(Gls)
1947–1950	SC Wacker Wien	72	(16)
1950–1965	Rapid Wien	333	(114)
Total		405	(130)

International career
1948–1962	Austria	93	(12)
Medal record
Representing Austria
FIFA World Cup
Third place	1954 Switzerland
- * Club domestic league appearances and goals

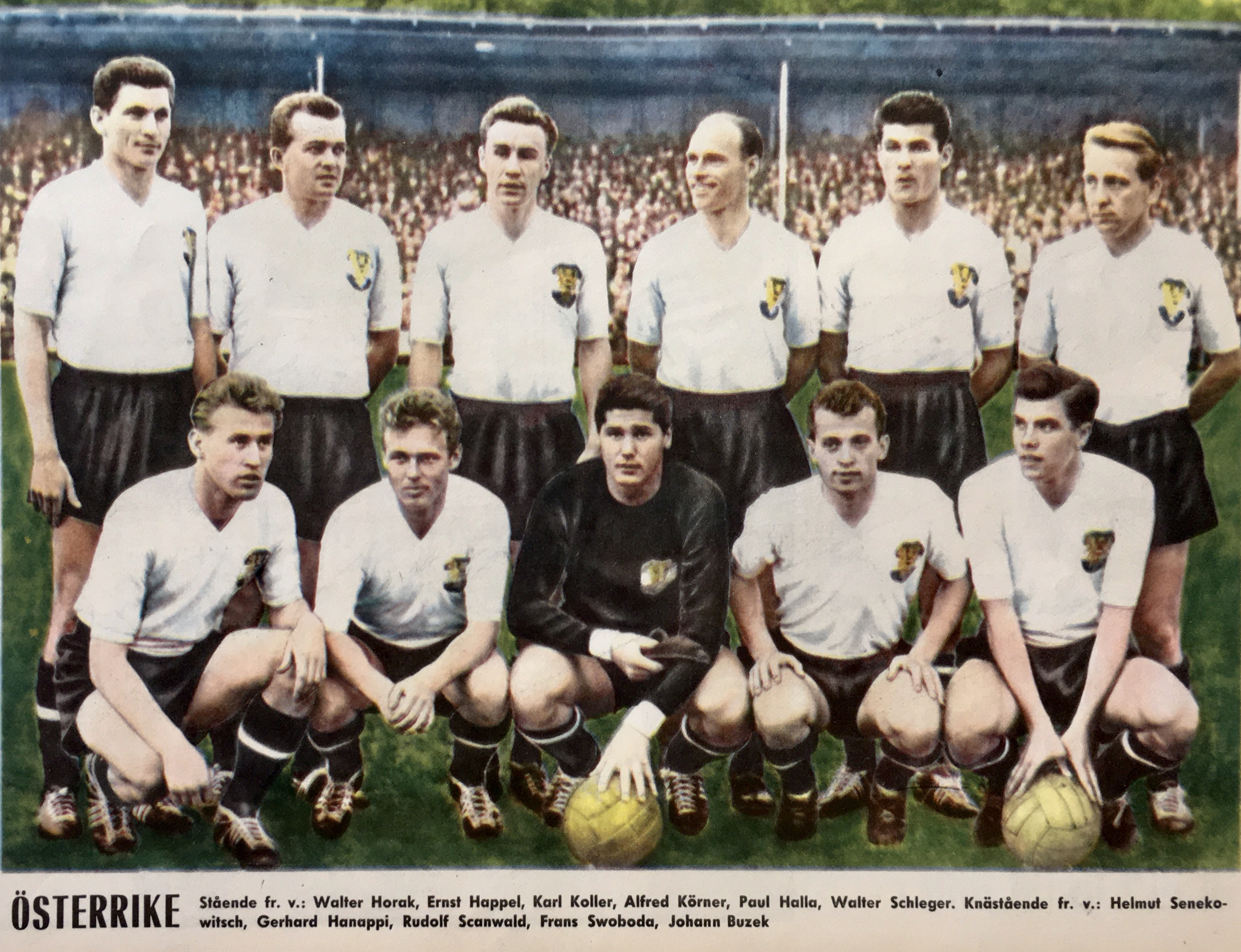
Austria national football team of 1958 with the following players – from left to right, standing; Walter Horak, Ernst Happel, Karl Koller, Alfred Körner, Paul Halla, Walter Schleger; crouched: Helmut Senekowitsch, Gerhard Hanappi, Rudolf Szanwald, Franz Swoboda and Johann Buzek.

Gerhard Hanappi (16 February 1929 – 23 August 1980) was an Austrian football midfielder who is often regarded as one of the greatest Austrian footballers. He is also the father of political economist Hardy Hanappi.

== Club career ==
A versatile midfielder, Hanappi started his career at SC Wacker Wien, where he made his Bundesliga debut in 1947. Deemed as Austria's biggest football talent, he then controversially moved to play for big city rivals Rapid Vienna from 1950 till 1965. His time at Rapid proved to be very successful, winning the Austrian Championship title 7 times. He also captained the side for seven years and was chosen in Rapid's Team of the Century in 1999.

== International career ==
He made his debut for Austria at only 19 years of age in November 1948 against Sweden and was a participant at the 1954 World Cup in Switzerland, where they reached 3rd place, and at the 1958 World Cup. He captained the national team from 1955 on.

His last international was a September 1962 match against Czechoslovakia. He earned 93 caps, scoring 12 goals. He has held the national team appearances record until Anton Polster earned his 94th cap in June 1998.

== Playing style ==
One of the most highly regarded midfielders of his generation, Hanappi was nominally a goalscoring wing half, however his versatility allowed him to play in almost all positions. Hanappi's technical abilities and creativity allowed him to play as an effective play-maker. He was also very intelligent with a sense of anticipation which made him useful in defensive duties, and also enabled him to make well timed runs in the box. This along with his accurate shot enabled him to be a high goalscorer, even once being league top scorer.

== Retirement and death ==
After his football career Hanappi worked as an architect. He planned the Weststadion in Vienna, which was renamed to Gerhard Hanappi Stadium after his death. He died of cancer in 1980, aged 51.

== Honours ==
=== Club ===
- Austrian Football Bundesliga (7):
  - 1951, 1952, 1954, 1956, 1957, 1960, 1964
- Austrian Cup (1):
  - 1961
- Zentropa Cup (1):
  - 1951

=== International ===
- FIFA World Cup Third Place:
  - 1954
