= Robert Dienst =

Austrian footballer

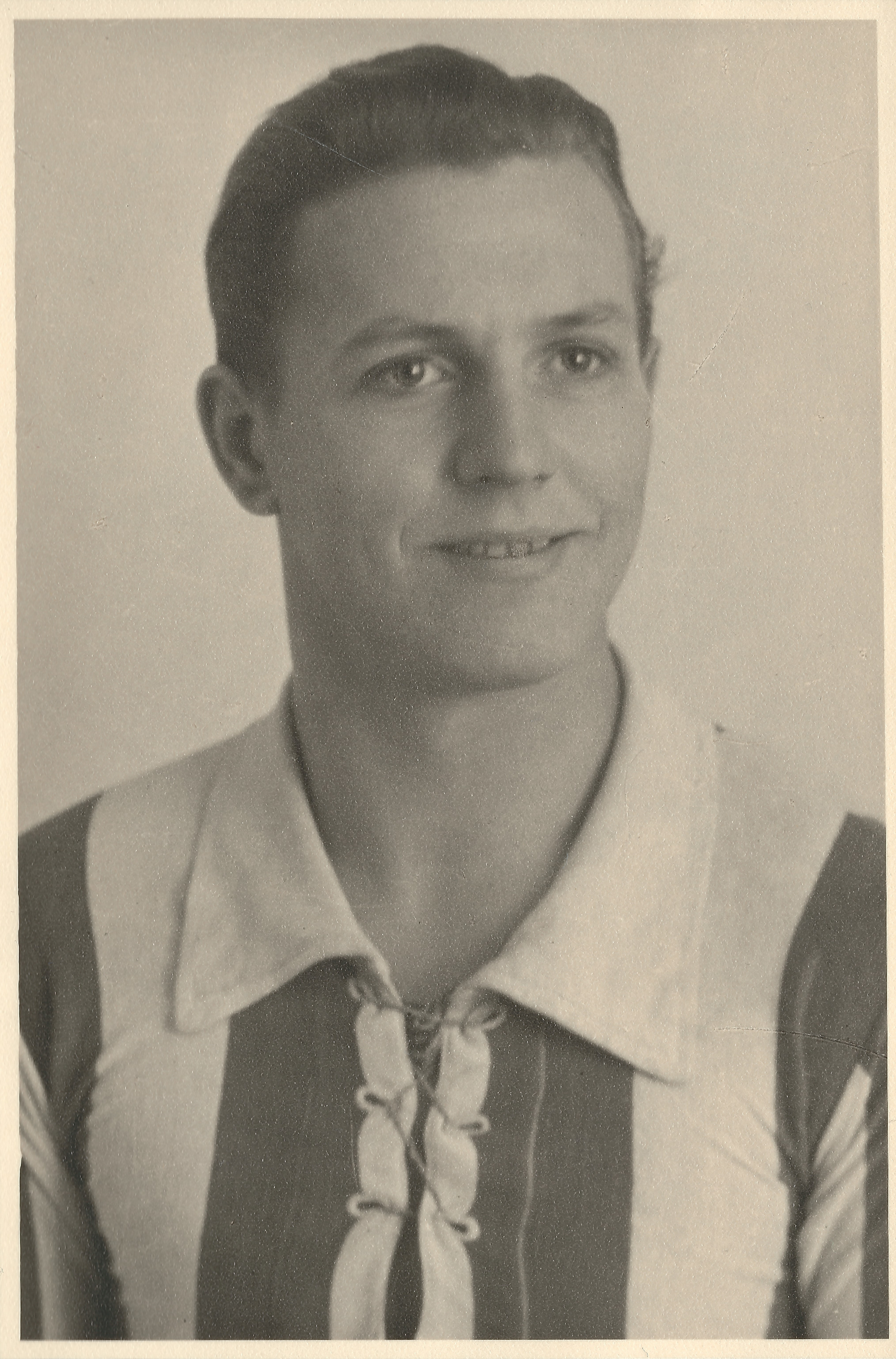

Personal information
- Full name: Robert Dienst
- Date of birth: 1 March 1928
- Place of birth: Vienna, Austria
- Date of death: 13 June 2000 (aged 72)
- Place of death: Vienna, Austria
- Position: Striker

Youth career
- 1942–1947: Floridsdorfer AC

Senior career*
Years	Team	Apps	(Gls)
1947–1948	Floridsdorfer AC		
1948–1962	SK Rapid Wien	284	(307)
1962–1968	SV Schwechat		

International career
1949–1957	Austria	27	(12)

Managerial career
- 1972–1974: SV Stockerau
- 1974–1975: FK Austria Wien
- 1975–1977: SV Stockerau
- 1979–1980: SV Stockerau
- 1982–1986: Kremser SC
Medal record
Representing Austria
FIFA World Cup
Third place	1954 Switzerland
- * Club domestic league appearances and goals

Robert Dienst (1 March 1928 – 13 June 2000) was an Austrian football forward. He died in 2000 after a long illness.

== Club career ==
Robert Dienst started his career at Floridsdorfer AC, where he played his first game as a midfielder during World War II. He turned into a prolific striker at Rapid Wien and became one of the most successful Austrian goalscorers in the 1950s, three times topping the top goalscorers charts and winning six league titles. With his 307 Bundesliga goals, he is still Rapid's record league goalscorer.

He scored 323 goals in 351 games in total in the Austrian Football Bundesliga.

== International career ==
He made his debut for Austria in an October 1949 match against Hungary and earned a total of 27 caps, scoring 12 goals. He was a participant at the 1954 FIFA World Cup and 1958 FIFA World Cup.

== Honours ==
- Austrian Football Bundesliga (6):
  - 1951, 1952, 1954, 1956, 1957, 1960
- Austrian Cup (1):
  - 1961
- Zentropa Cup (1):
  - 1951
- Austrian Bundesliga Top Goalscorer (4):
  - 1951, 1953, 1954, 1957
