= Czechoslovakia national football team results (1920–1938) =

This is a list of the Czechoslovakia national football team games between 1920 and 1938, as well as the games that the nation played as Bohemia between 1903 and 1908 and as Bohemia & Moravia in 1939.

The Czechoslovakia national team was officially created in 1920, however, the first appearance of a Czech national team was in 1906, as the Bohemia selection. Czechoslovakia participated in the Inter-Allied Games in Paris in 1919 and won the tournament after beating the hosts France, in the final, but their first official game recognized by FIFA was at the 1920 Summer Olympics in Antwerp.

Between their first match in 1920 and 1938, when competitive football stopped because of the Second World War, Czechoslovakia played in 124 matches, resulting in 65 victories, 26 draws and 33 defeats. Throughout this period they played in the Central European International Cup four times between 1927 and 1938 with Czechoslovakia's best result being a joint runner-up finish in the inaugural edition in 1927–30. They also played in two Olympic football tournaments in 1920 and 1924, with Czechoslovakia reaching the final on the former, where they lost to hosts Belgium. Czechoslovakia also qualified through to two FIFA World Cups, the 1934 and 1938 editions, reaching the final of the former, where they once again lost to the hosts, Italy.

== Results ==
Key
Win
Draw
Defeat

=== Bohemia national team ===
5 April 1903 Friendly	Hungary	2–1	Bohemia	Budapest, Hungary
15:30 (UTC+1:00)	Borbás 16'; Minder 78'	Report; Report2	Rezek 9'	Stadium: Millenáris Sporttelep; Attendance: 750; Referee: Béla Ordódy (Hungary)

1 April 1906 Friendly	Hungary	1–1	Bohemia	Budapest, Hungary
16:00 (UTC+1:00)	Károly 80'	Report	Valášek 56'	Stadium: Millenáris Sporttelep; Attendance: 5,000; Referee: Theodor Holley (Austria)

7 October 1906 Friendly	Bohemia	4–4	Hungary	Prague, Kingdom of Bohemia
15:30 (UTC+1:00)	Starý 22', 83'; Baumruk 65'; Košek 88'	Report	Horváth 33', 86'; Károly 59'; Molnár 61'	Stadium: Stadion Slavii; Attendance: 6,000; Referee: Paul Heyne (Germany)
Note: Jan Starý set the goal scoring record for Bohemia (2 goals)

7 April 1907 Friendly	Hungary	5–2	Bohemia	Budapest, Hungary
16:15 (UTC+1:00)	Horváth 21', 74', 85'; Borbás 57'; Molnár 82' (pen.)	Report	Pelikán 9'; Jelínek 29'	Stadium: Millenáris Sporttelep; Attendance: 1,000; Referee: Alfréd Hajós (Hungary)

6 October 1907 Friendly	Bohemia	5–3	Hungary	Prague, Kingdom of Bohemia
15:00 (UTC+1:00)	Košek 15', 35', 86'; Bělka 62', 88'	Report	Gorszky 4'; Szednicsek 16'; Weisz 25'	Stadium: Stadion Slavii; Attendance: 4,000; Referee: Josef Gruss (Bohemia)
Note: Jan Košek set the goal scoring record for Bohemia (4 goals)

5 April 1908 Friendly	Hungary	5–2	Bohemia	Budapest, Hungary
16:00 (UTC+1:00)	Schlosser 1', 73'; Károly 75', 86' (pen.), 87'	Report	Bělka 48', 74'	Stadium: Millenáris Sporttelep; Attendance: 8,500; Referee: Theodor Holley (Austria)

13 June 1908 Friendly	Bohemia	0–4	England	Prague, Kingdom of Bohemia
15:00 (UTC+1:00)		Report	Hilsdon 24', 50' (pen.); Windridge 55'; Rutherford 83'	Stadium: Stadion Slavii; Attendance: 4,000; Referee: John Lewis (Great Britain)

=== 1919 Inter-Allied Games ===
24 June 1919 Inter-Allied Games group stage	Czechoslovakia	4–1	Belgium	Paris, France
		Report		Stadium: Stade Pershing

26 June 1919 Inter-Allied Games group stage	Czechoslovakia	8–2	United States	Paris, France
		Report		Stadium: Stade Pershing

28 June 1919 Inter-Allied Games group stage	Czechoslovakia	3–2	Canada	Paris, France
		Report		Stadium: Stade Pershing

29 June 1919 Inter-Allied Games Final	France	2–3	Czechoslovakia	Paris, France
16:30		Report		Stadium: Stade Pershing

=== The Czechoslovakia national football team ===
==== 1920 ====
28 August 1920 1920 Summer Olympics First Round	Czechoslovakia	7–0	(Kingdom of Yugoslavia) Kingdom of SCS	Antwerp, Belgium
10:00	Vanik 20', 46', 79'; Janda 34', 50', 75'; Sedláček 43'	Report		Stadium: Stadion Broodstraat; Attendance: 600; Referee: Raphael Van Praag (Netherlands)
Note: This was Czechoslovakia and Yugoslavia's international official debuts. At the time, this was the biggest victory of the Czechoslovakia football team as well as the heaviest defeat of the Yugoslavia football team.

29 August 1920 1920 Summer Olympics Quarter-finals	Czechoslovakia	4–0	Norway	Brussels, Belgium
16:30	Vanik 8'; Janda 17', 66', 77'	Report		Stadium: La Butte; Attendance: 4,000; Referee: Charles Barette (Belgium)
Note: Antonín Janda set the goal scoring record for Czechoslovakia (6 goals)

29 August 1920 1920 Summer Olympics Semi-finals	Czechoslovakia	4–1	France	Antwerp, Belgium
15:35	Mazal 18', 75', 87'; Steiner 70'	Report	Boyer 79'	Stadium: Olympic Stadium; Attendance: 12,000; Referee: Johannes Mutters (Netherlands)

2 September 1920 1920 Summer Olympics Final	Belgium	2–0	Czechoslovakia	Antwerp, Belgium
17:30	Coppée 6' (pen.); Larnoe 30'	Report		Stadium: Olympic Stadium; Attendance: 35,000; Referee: John Lewis (Great Britain)

==== 1921 ====
28 October 1921 Friendly	Czechoslovakia	6–1	(Kingdom of Yugoslavia) Kingdom of SCS	Prague, Czechoslovakia
15:00 (UTC+1:00)	Vanik 59', 63', 78', 86'; Janda 60', 65'	Report	Zinaja 72'	Stadium: Stadion Letná; Attendance: 15,000; Referee: Willem Boas (Netherlands)
Note: Antonín Janda set the goal scoring record for Czechoslovakia (8 goals)

13 November 1921 Friendly	Czechoslovakia	2–2	Sweden	Prague, Czechoslovakia
14:30 (UTC+1:00)	Janda 32', 54'	Report	Carlsson 30'; Edlund 65'	Stadium: Stadion Letná; Attendance: 10,000; Referee: Heinrich Retschury (Austria)
Note: Antonín Janda set the goal scoring record for Czechoslovakia (10 goals)

==== 1922 ====
26 February 1922 Friendly	Italy	1-1	Czechoslovakia	Turin, Italy
15:00 (UTC+1:00)	Baloncieri 52'	Report	Janda 84'	Stadium: Motovelodromo; Attendance: 15,000; Referee: Marcel Slawik (France)

11 June 1922 Friendly	Denmark	0-3	Czechoslovakia	Copenhagen, Denmark
13:15 (UTC+1:00)		Report	Janda 8'; Dvořáček 36', 49'	Stadium: Idrætsparken; Attendance: 20,000; Referee: Heinrich Retschury (Austria)
Note: Antonín Janda set the goal scoring record for Czechoslovakia (12 goals)

28 June 1922 Friendly	Kingdom of SCS (Kingdom of Yugoslavia)	4-3	Czechoslovakia	Zagreb, Yugoslavia
	Ábrahám 45', 70'; Zinaja 63' (pen.), 74'	Report	Dvořáček 16'; Vanik 21'; Plodr 28'	Stadium: Stadion Concordije; Attendance: 6,000; Referee: Alfred Preßler (Austria)

13 August 1922 Friendly	Sweden	0-2	Czechoslovakia	Stockholm, Sweden
14:00 (UTC+1:00)		Report	Sloup 29'; Dvořáček 37'	Stadium: Stockholms Stadion; Attendance: 17,000; Referee: Lauritz Andersen (Denmark)

==== 1923 ====
6 May 1923 Friendly	Czechoslovakia	2-0	Denmark	Prague, Czechoslovakia
17:30 (UTC+1:00)	Císař 19'; Sloup 39'	Report		Stadium: Stadion Letná; Attendance: 15,000; Referee: Jacques Hirrlé (Switzerland)

27 May 1923 Friendly	Czechoslovakia	5-1	Italy	Prague, Czechoslovakia
18:00 (UTC+1:00)	Sedláček 18', 32', 41'; Dvořáček 44'; Koželuh 80'	Report	Moscardini 52'	Stadium: Stadion Letná; Attendance: 25,000; Referee: Heinrich Retschury (Austria)

1 July 1923 Friendly	Romania	0-6	Czechoslovakia	Cluj-Napoca, Romania
18:00 (UTC+1:44)		Report	Vlček 16', 29'; Sloup 50', 66'; Čapek 69', 82'	Stadium: Stadionul Oraşului; Attendance: 8,000; Referee: Max Seemann (Austria)
Note: At the time, this was the heaviest defeat of the Romania national team.

28 October 1923 Friendly	Czechoslovakia	4-4	(Kingdom of Yugoslavia) Kingdom of SCS	Prague, Czechoslovakia
15:00 (UTC+1:00)	Čapek 20', 40'; Stapl 60', 62'	Report	Petković 4'; Jovanović 9', 15'; Babić 21'	Stadium: Stadion Letná; Attendance: 15,000; Referee: Eugen Braun (Austria)

==== 1924 ====
25 May 1924 1924 Summer Olympics first round	Czechoslovakia	5-2	Turkey	Paris, France
15:30 (UTC+1:00)	Sloup 21'; Sedláček 28', 37'; Novák 64'; Čapek 74'	Report	Refet 63', 82'	Stadium: Stade Bergeyre; Attendance: 4,344; Referee: Peder Christian Andersen (Norway)
Note: At the time, this was the heaviest defeat of the Turkey national team

28 May 1924 1924 Summer Olympics Second round	Switzerland	1–1 (a.e.t.)	Czechoslovakia	Paris, France
17:00	Dietrich 79'	Report	Sloup 21' (pen.)	Stadium: Stade Bergeyre; Attendance: 9,153; Referee: Peder Christian Andersen (Norway)

30 May 1924 1924 Summer Olympics Second round replay	Switzerland	1–0	Czechoslovakia	Paris, France
17:00	Pache 87'	Report		Stadium: Stade Bergeyre; Attendance: 5,673; Referee: Marcel Slawik (France)

31 August 1923 Friendly	Czechoslovakia	4-1	Romania	Prague, Czechoslovakia
17:00 (UTC+1:00)	Dvořáček 33'; Kolenatý 35'; Žďárský 58'; Ryšavý 79'	Report	Semler 85'	Stadium: Stadion Slavii; Attendance: 18,000; Referee: Max Seemann (Austria)
Note: At the time, this was the heaviest defeat of the Romania national team.

28 September 1924 Friendly	Kingdom of SCS (Kingdom of Yugoslavia)	0-2	Czechoslovakia	Zagreb, Yugoslavia
15:30 (UTC+1:00)		Report	Laštovička 54'; Vanik 65'	Stadium: Stadion Concordije; Attendance: 8,000; Referee: Eugen Braun (Austria)

==== 1925 ====
24 May 1925 Friendly	Czechoslovakia	3-1	Austria	Prague, Czechoslovakia
18:00 (UTC+1:00)	Szedlacsik 33'; Čapek 58'; Severin 63'	Report	Swatosch 52'	Stadium: Stadion Letná; Attendance: 15,000; Referee: Charles Barette (Belgium)

11 October 1925 Friendly	Czechoslovakia	2-0	Hungary	Prague, Czechoslovakia
15:30 (UTC+1:00)	Perner 49'; Dvořáček 78'	Report		Stadium: Stadion Letná; Attendance: 3,000; Referee: Heinrich Retschury (Austria)

28 October 1925 Friendly	Czechoslovakia	7-0	(Kingdom of Yugoslavia) Kingdom of SCS	Prague, Czechoslovakia
15:00 (UTC+1:00)	Steiner 6' (pen.); Wimmer 24'; Dvořáček 36', 40', 66'; Silny 41'; Šoltys 82'	Report		Stadium: Stadion Letná; Attendance: 15,000; Referee: Giovanni Mauro (Italy)

==== 1926 ====
17 January 1926 Friendly	Italy	3-1	Czechoslovakia	Turin, Italy
15:00 (UTC+1:00)	Della Valle 16'; Conti 73'; Magnozzi 89'	Report	Křišťál 23'	Stadium: Motovelodromo; Attendance: 18,000; Referee: Mihály Iváncsics (Hungary)

14 March 1926 Friendly	Austria	2-0	Czechoslovakia	Vienna, Austria
15:30 (UTC+1:00)	Morocutti 20'; Hierländer 60'	Report		Stadium: Hohe Warte Stadium; Attendance: 40,000; Referee: Mihály Iváncsics (Hungary)

6 June 1926 Friendly	Hungary	2-1	Czechoslovakia	Budapest, Hungary
17:00 (UTC+1:00)	Takács 31'; Kohut 66'	Report	Silný 38'	Stadium: Üllői úti stadion Attendance: 27,000; Referee: Giovanni Mauro (Italy)

28 June 1926 Friendly	Kingdom of SCS (Kingdom of Yugoslavia)	2-6	Czechoslovakia	Zagreb, Yugoslavia
	Petković 15'; Giler 19'	Report	Wimmer 16'; Sinly 17', 27', 41', 62'; Puč 43'	Stadium: Stadion Concordije; Attendance: 10,000; Referee: Eugen Braun (Austria)

3 July 1926 Friendly	Czechoslovakia	4-2	Sweden	Prague, Czechoslovakia
15:00 (UTC+1:00)	Mareš 19'; Jelínek 25'; Novák 54'; Meduna 64'	Report	Holmberg 44'; Johansson 87'	Stadium: Stadion Letná; Attendance: 17,000; Referee: Eugen Braun (Austria)

28 September 1926 Friendly	Czechoslovakia	1-2	Austria	Prague, Czechoslovakia
16:00 (UTC+1:00)	Jelínek 49'	Report	Sindelar 27'; Wortmann 83'	Stadium: Stadion Letná; Attendance: 20,000; Referee: John Langenus (Belgium)

28 October 1926 Friendly	Czechoslovakia	3-1	Italy	Prague, Czechoslovakia
15:00 (UTC+1:00)	Puč 7'; Čapek 36', 52'	Report	Levratto 18'	Stadium: Stadion Slavii; Attendance: 20,000; Referee: Ferenc Gerő (Hungary)

==== 1927 ====
2 January 1927 Friendly	Belgium	2-3	Czechoslovakia	Liège, Belgium
15:00 (UTC+0:00)	Bierna 60'; Gillis 84'	Report	Svoboda 22', 78'; Podrazil 50'	Stadium: Stade de Sclessin; Attendance: 20,000; Referee: Willem Eijmers (Netherlands)

20 February 1927 Friendly	Italy	2-2	Czechoslovakia	Milan, Italy
15:00 (UTC+1:00)	Libonatti 31'; Baloncieri 70'	Report	Puč 17'; Silný 39'	Stadium: San Siro; Attendance: 28,000; Referee: Eugen Braun (Austria)

20 March 1927 Friendly	Austria	1-2	Czechoslovakia	Vienna, Austria
16:00 (UTC+1:00)	Blum 87'	Report	Puč 3'; Maloun 11'	Stadium: Hohe Warte Stadium; Attendance: 45,000; Referee: Mihály Iváncsics (Hungary)

24 April 1927 Friendly	Czechoslovakia	4-1	Hungary	Prague, Czechoslovakia
16:00 (UTC+1:00)	Puč 17'; Steiner 25' (pen.); Svoboda 37'; Silný 50'	Report	Mészáros 42'	Stadium: Stadion Slavii; Attendance: 20,000; Referee: Julius Zwicker (Austria)

26 May 1927 Friendly	Czechoslovakia	4-0	Belgium	Prague, Czechoslovakia
17:30 (UTC+1:44)	Puč 33', 66'; Fleischmann 46'; Silný 60'	Report		Stadium: Stadion Slavii; Attendance: 20,000; Referee: Jacques Hirrlé Switzerland
Note: Biggest victory of the Yugoslavia football team

31 July 1927 Friendly	Kingdom of SCS (Kingdom of Yugoslavia)	1-1	Czechoslovakia	Belgrade, Kingdom of Yugoslavia
17:30 (+1:00)	Perska 35'	Report	Puč 47'	Stadium: Stadion S.K. Jugoslavija; Attendance: 10,000; Referee: Mihály Iváncsics (Hungary)

18 September 1927 1927–30 Central European Cup	Czechoslovakia	2-0	Austria	Prague, Czechoslovakia
15:00 (+1:00)	Podrazil 10'; Kratochvíl 55' (pen.)	Report		Stadium: Great Strahov Stadium; Attendance: 25,000; Referee: Ernest Fabris (Yugoslavia)

9 October 1927 Friendly	Hungary	1-2	Czechoslovakia	Budapest, Hungary
15:00 (+1:00)	Kohut 31'	Report	Podrazil 45'; Silný 49'	Stadium: Hungária körúti stadion Attendance: 40,000; Referee: Eugen Braun (Austria)

23 October 1927 1927–30 Central European Cup	Czechoslovakia	2-2	Italy	Prague, Czechoslovakia
15:00 (+1:00)	Svoboda 32', 51' (pen.)	Report	Libonatti 28', 79'	Stadium: Stadion Letná; Attendance: 12,000; Referee: John Langenus (Belgium)

28 October 1927 Friendly	Czechoslovakia	5-3	(Kingdom of Yugoslavia) Kingdom of SCS	Prague, Czechoslovakia
15:00 (+1:00)	Šoltys 40'; Svoboda 19', 68'; Bejbl 23', 36'	Report	Jovanović 47'; Benčić 48' (pen.); Bonačić 61'	Stadium: Stadion Slavii; Attendance: 15,000; Referee: Mihály Iváncsics (Hungary)

==== 1928 ====
1 April 1928 1927–30 Central European Cup	Austria	0–1	Czechoslovakia	Vienna, Austria
16:30 (UTC+1:00)		Report	Silný 38'	Stadium: Hohe Warte Stadium; Attendance: 50,575; Referee: John Langenus (Belgium)

22 April 1928 1927–30 Central European Cup	Hungary	2–0	Czechoslovakia	Budapest, Hungary
16:30 (+1:00)	Hirzer 18' (pen.); Kohut 76'	Report		Stadium: Üllői úti stadion Attendance: 38,000; Referee: Raphaël van Praag (Belgium)

13 May 1928 Friendly	France	0–2	Czechoslovakia	Colombes, France
15:00 (UTC+1:00)		Report	Puč 2', 57'	Stadium: Stade Olympique Yves-du-Manoir; Attendance: 19,000; Referee: Henri Christophe (Belgium)

23 September 1928 Friendly	Czechoslovakia	6-1	Hungary	Prague, Czechoslovakia
16:00	Podrazil 14'; Bejbl 17', 55'; Pešek 48'; Puč 52'; Kratochvíl 63'	Report	(?)	Stadium: Stadion Letná; Attendance: 18,000; Referee: Emil Göbel (Austria)

27 October 1928 1928 Slavic Tournament	Czechoslovakia	3-2	Poland	Prague, Czechoslovakia
15:00 (UTC+1:00)	Puč 31', 61'; Bejbl 33'	Report	Reyman 69', 72'	Stadium: Stadion Letná; Attendance: 5,000; Referee: Eugen Braun (Austria)
Note: Antonín Puč set the goal scoring record for Yugoslavia (13 goals)

28 October 1928 1928 Slavic Tournament	Czechoslovakia	7-1	(Kingdom of Yugoslavia) Kingdom of SCS	Prague, Czechoslovakia
15:00 (UTC+1:00)	Šoltys 11'; Puč 65', 89'; Silny 68', 82'; Bejbl 69', 87'	Report	Beleslin 17'	Stadium: Stadion Letná; Attendance: 15,000; Referee: Eugen Braun (Austria)
Note: Antonín Puč set the goal scoring record for Yugoslavia (15 goals)

==== 1929 ====
3 March 1929 1927–30 Central European Cup	Italy	4-2	Czechoslovakia	Bologna, Kingdom of Italy
15:00 (UTC+1:00)	Rossetti 26', 61', 80'; Libonatti 33'	Report	Silný 18'; Svoboda 40'	Stadium: Stadio Littorale; Attendance: 35,000; Referee: Henri Christophe (Belgium)

17 March 1929 Friendly	Czechoslovakia	3-3	Austria	Prague, Czechoslovakia
15:00 (UTC+1:00)	Silný 43'; Šoltys 47'; Svoboda 80'	Report	Siegl 18'; Weselik 20', 87'	Stadium: Stadion Letná; Attendance: 23,000; Referee: Frigyes Klug (Hungary)

5 May 1929 1927–30 Central European Cup	Switzerland	1-4	Czechoslovakia	Lausanne, Switzerland
15:00 (UTC+1:00)	M. Abegglen 74'	Report	Podrazil 22'; Silný 23', 85'; Puč 80'	Stadium: Stade Olympique de la Pontaise; Attendance: 20,000; Referee: Eugen Braun (Austria)
Note: Josef Silný set the goal scoring record for Yugoslavia (17 goals)

28 June 1929 Friendly	(Kingdom of Yugoslavia) Kingdom of SCS	3-3	Czechoslovakia	Zagreb, Yugoslavia
17:30 (+1:00)	Hitrec 35'; Marjanović 43', 52'	Report	Knobloch-Madelon 30'; Hojer 42'; Silny 67'	Stadium: Stadion Concordije; Attendance: 8,000; Referee: Herbert Frankenstein (Austria)
Note: Josef Silný set the goal scoring record for Yugoslavia (18 goals)

8 September 1929 1927–30 Central European Cup	Czechoslovakia	1-1	Hungary	Prague, Czechoslovakia
16:30 (UTC+1:00)	Svoboda 4'	Report	Kalmár 84'	Stadium: Stadion Letná; Attendance: 28,000; Referee: Paul Ruoff (Switzerland)

15 September 1929 Friendly	Austria	2-1	Czechoslovakia	Vienna, Austria
17:30 (+1:00)	Gschweidl 38'; Weselik 41' (pen.)	Report	Kratochvíl 28'	Stadium: Hohe Warte Stadium; Attendance: 37,198; Referee: Albino Carraro (Italy)

6 October 1929 1927–30 Central European Cup	Czechoslovakia	5-0	Switzerland	Prague, Czechoslovakia
15:00 (UTC+1:00)	Puč 17', 81'; Kratochvíl 18'; Svoboda 36'; Junek 64'	Report		Stadium: Stadion Letná; Attendance: 17,000; Referee: John Langenus (Belgium)

28 October 1929 Friendly	Czechoslovakia	4-3	Kingdom of Yugoslavia	Prague, Czechoslovakia
15:00 (UTC+1:00)	Kloz 2'; Silny 10', 75'; Thaut 69'	Report	Hitrec 48', 83'; Lajnert 82'	Stadium: Stadion Letná; Attendance: 8,000; Referee: Emil Göbel (Austria)

==== 1930 ====
1 January 1930 Friendly	Spain	1-0	Czechoslovakia	Barcelona, Spain
15:00	Sastre 75'	Report		Stadium: The 1929 Exposition stadium Attendance: 40,000; Referee: Henri Christophe (Belgium)

12 January 1930 Friendly	Portugal	1-0	Czechoslovakia	Lisbon, Portugal
14:00	Pepe 61'	Report		Stadium: Estádio do Lumiar; Attendance: 25,000; Referee: Pedro Escartín (Spain)

23 March 1930 Friendly	Czechoslovakia	2-2	Austria	Prague, Czechoslovakia
15:00 (UTC+1:00)	Svoboda 57'; Junek 87'	Report	Horvath 12', 73'	Stadium: Stadion Letná; Attendance: 28,000; Referee: Paul Ruoff (Switzerland)

1 May 1930 Friendly	Czechoslovakia	1-1	Hungary	Prague, Czechoslovakia
16:30 (UTC+1:00)	Hojer 73' (pen.)	Report	Hirzer 3'	Stadium: Stadion Letná; Attendance: 24,000; Referee: Per Andersen (Norway)

11 May 1930 Friendly	France	2-3	Czechoslovakia	Colombes, France
15:00 (UTC+1:00)	Korb 25' (pen.); Delfour 30'	Report	Košťálek 6'; Silný 17'; Junek 76'	Stadium: Stade Yves-du-Manoir; Attendance: 15,000; Referee: John Langenus (Belgium)
Note: Josef Silný set the goal scoring record for Yugoslavia (21 goals)

14 June 1930 Friendly	Czechoslovakia	2-0	Spain	Prague, Czechoslovakia
18:00 (UTC+1:00)	Hojer 62' (pen.); Svoboda 83'	Report		Stadium: Stadion Letná; Attendance: 22,000; Referee: John Langenus (Belgium)

21 September 1930 Friendly	Belgium	2-3	Czechoslovakia	Antwerp, Belgium
16:00 (UTC+1:00)	Versyp 44'; Voorhoof 51'	Report	Šoltys 25'; Hejma 31'; Junek 40'	Stadium: Bosuilstadion; Attendance: 15,000; Referee: José Llovera (Spain)

26 October 1930 Friendly	Hungary	1–1	Czechoslovakia	Budapest, Hungary
14:00 (+1:00)	Titkos 1'	Report	Šoltys 48'	Stadium: Hungária körúti stadion Attendance: 12,000; Referee: Peco Bauwens (Germany)

==== 1931 ====
15 February 1931 Friendly	France	1-2	Czechoslovakia	Colombes, France
14:30	Langiller 23' (pen.)	Report	Novák 5' (pen.), 84' (pen.)	Stadium: Stade Yves-du-Manoir; Attendance: 28,000; Referee: John Langenus (Belgium)

22 March 1931 1931–32 Central European Cup	Czechoslovakia	3-3	Hungary	Prague, Czechoslovakia
16:00 (+1:00)	Svoboda 35', 66'; Junek 45'	Report	Avar 11', 33', 53'	Stadium: Stadion Letná; Attendance: 26,700; Referee: Peco Bauwens (Germany)

12 April 1931 1931–32 Central European Cup	Austria	2-1	Czechoslovakia	Vienna, Austria
16:00 (UTC+1:00)	Nausch 37'; Horvath 42'	Report	Silný 38'	Stadium: Hohe Warte Stadium; Attendance: 42,000; Referee: Paul Ruoff (Switzerland)

13 June 1931 1931–32 Central European Cup	Czechoslovakia	7-3	Switzerland	Prague, Czechoslovakia
18:00 (+1:00)	Bejbl 12', 53', 82'; Silný 48', 58'; Bradáč 64', 80'	Report	Fasson 5'; Büche 33' (pen.); Springer 35'	Stadium: Stadion Letná; Attendance: 15,000; Referee: Albino Carraro (Italy)
Note: Josef Silný set the goal scoring record for Czechoslovakia (24 goals)

14 June 1931 Friendly	Poland	0-4	Czechoslovakia	Warsaw, Poland
18:00 (+1:00)		Report	Pelcner 1', 53'; Bára 62'; Nejedlý 66'	Stadium: Stadion Wojska Polskiego; Attendance: 13,000; Referee: Eric Malmström (Sweden)

20 September 1931 Friendly	Hungary	3–0	Czechoslovakia	Budapest, Hungary
14:00 (+1:00)	Turay 10'; Avar 16'; Kalmár 32'	Report		Stadium: Üllői úti stadion Attendance: 18,000; Referee: Peco Bauwens (Germany)

15 November 1931 1931–32 Central European Cup	Italy	2-2	Czechoslovakia	Rome, Kingdom of Italy
15:00 (+1:00)	Pitto 53'; Bernardini 57' (pen.)	Report	Svoboda 55', 83'	Stadium: Stadio Nazionale PNF; Attendance: 35,000; Referee: Paul Ruoff (Switzerland)

==== 1932 ====
20 March 1932 Friendly	Czechoslovakia	1-3	Hungary	Prague, Czechoslovakia
16:00 (UTC+1:00)	Silný 51'	Report	Turay 64'; Závodi 65'; Toldi 71'	Stadium: Stadion Letná; Attendance: 26,000; Referee: Sophus Hansen (Denmark)

17 April 1932 1931–32 Central European Cup	Switzerland	5-1	Czechoslovakia	Zürich, Switzerland
15:00 (+1:00)	A. Abegglen 17', 41'; M. Abegglen 28', 48'; Billeter 80'	Report	Bradáč 63'	Stadium: Hardturm; Attendance: 21,000; Referee: Louis Raguin (France)

22 May 1932 1931–32 Central European Cup	Czechoslovakia	1-1	Austria	Prague, Czechoslovakia
17:00 (+1:00)	Svoboda 36'	Report	Sindelar 2'	Stadium: Stadion Letná; Attendance: 30,000; Referee: Moritz Fuchs (Germany)

29 May 1932 Friendly	Netherlands	1-2	Czechoslovakia	Amsterdam, Netherlands
14:30 (UTC+1:20)	Bonsema 17'	Report	Silný 24'; Nejedlý 66'	Stadium: Olympic Stadium; Attendance: 32,000; Referee: Peco Bauwens (Germany)
Note: Josef Silný set the goal scoring record for Czechoslovakia (26 goals)

18 September 1932 1931–32 Central European Cup	Hungary	2-1	Czechoslovakia	Budapest, Hungary
16:00 (+1:00)	Toldi 78'; Titkos 81'	Report	Puč 73'	Stadium: Üllői úti stadion Attendance: 25,000; Referee: Otto Ohlsson (Sweden)

9 October 1932 Friendly	Czechoslovakia	2-1	Kingdom of Yugoslavia	Prague, Czechoslovakia
15:00 (+1:00)	Puč 5'; Nejedlý 68'	Report	Zečević 37'	Stadium: Stadion Letná; Attendance: 20,000; Referee: Andrzej Rutkowski (Poland)

28 October 1932 1931–32 Central European Cup	Czechoslovakia	2-1	Italy	Prague, Czechoslovakia
15:00 (+1:00)	Bradáč 28' (pen.); Nejedlý 59'	Report	Ferrari 54'	Stadium: Sportovní Stadion; Attendance: 31,000; Referee: Peco Bauwens (Germany)

==== 1933 ====
19 March 1933 Friendly	Hungary	2–0	Czechoslovakia	Budapest, Hungary
16:00 (+1:00)	Turay 22'; Cseh 71'	Report		Stadium: Hungária körúti stadion Attendance: 25,000; Referee: William Bangerter (Switzerland)

9 April 1933 Friendly	Austria	1-2	Czechoslovakia	Vienna, Austria
16:30 (UTC+1:00)	Smistik 86'	Report	Puč 46', 50'	Stadium: Hohe Warte Stadium; Attendance: 61,000; Referee: John Langenus (Belgium)

7 May 1933 1933–35 Central European Cup	Italy	2-0	Czechoslovakia	Florence, Kingdom of Italy
15:30 (UTC+1:00)	Ferrari 41'; Schiavio 44'	Report		Stadium: Stadio Comunale Giovanni Berta; Attendance: 25,000; Referee: Louis Baert (Belgium)

10 June 1933 Friendly	Czechoslovakia	4-0	France	Prague, Czechoslovakia
18:00 (UTC+1:00)	Puč 27'; Junek 47'; Svoboda 59'; Nejedlý 63'	Report		Stadium: Stadion Letná; Attendance: 18,000; Referee: Andrzej Rutkowski (Poland)

6 August 1933 Friendly	Yugoslavia	2-1	Czechoslovakia	Zagreb, Yugoslavia
17:30 (+1:00)	Kragić 66'; Kodrnja 72'	Report	Kocsis 54'	Stadium: Stadion Concordije; Attendance: 7,000; Referee: Alois Beranek (Austria)

17 September 1933 Friendly	Czechoslovakia	3-3	Austria	Prague, Czechoslovakia
16:30 (+1:00)	Puč 1', 69'; Silný 55'	Report	Müller 3'; Sindelar 17', 58'	Stadium: Stadion Letná; Attendance: 25,000; Referee: John Langenus (Belgium)
Note: Josef Silný set the goal scoring record for Czechoslovakia (27 goals)

15 October 1933 1934 FIFA World Cup qualification	Poland	1–2	Czechoslovakia	Warsaw, Poland
	Martyna 52' (pen.)	Report	Silný 33'; Pelcner 77'	Stadium: Polish Army Stadium; Attendance: 16,000; Referee: Denis Xifando (Romania)
Note: Josef Silný set the goal scoring record for Czechoslovakia (28 goals)

==== 1934 ====
25 March 1934 Friendly	France	1-2	Czechoslovakia	Colombes, France
15:00 (UTC+1:00)	Korb 6'	Report	Svoboda 37'; Sobotka 89'	Stadium: Stade Yves-du-Manoir; Attendance: 27,931; Referee: Walter Lewington (England)

15 April 1934 1934 FIFA World Cup qualification	Czechoslovakia	2–0 awarded (Note: Poland were unable to travel to Prague for the second match as the Polish government denied the team visas for political reasons. The match was awarded as 2–0 to Czechoslovakia.)	Poland	Prague, Czechoslovakia
Note: Czechoslovakia qualified.

29 April 1934 1933–35 Central European Cup	Czechoslovakia	2–2	Hungary	Prague, Czechoslovakia
17:00 (+3:00)	Sobotka 2'; Puč 42'	Report	Sárosi 30', 56'	Stadium: Stadion Letná; Attendance: 30,000; Referee: Francesco Mattea (Italy)

16 May 1934 Friendly	Czechoslovakia	2-1	England	Prague, Czechoslovakia
17:30 (+1:00)	Nejedlý 42'; Puč 61'	Report	Tilson 20'	Stadium: Stadion Letná; Attendance: 35,000; Referee: John Langenus (Belgium)

27 May 1934 1934 World Cup Round of 16	Czechoslovakia	2–1	Romania	Trieste, Kingdom of Italy
16:00 CET (UTC+01:00)	Puč 50'; Nejedlý 67'	Report	Dobay 11'	Stadium: Stadio Littorio; Attendance: 9,000; Referee: John Langenus (Belgium)

31 May 1934 1934 World Cup quarter-finals	Czechoslovakia	3–2	Switzerland	Turin, Kingdom of Italy
16:30 CET (UTC+01:00)	Svoboda 24'; Sobotka 49'; Nejedlý 82'	Report	Kielholz 18'; Jäggi 78'	Stadium: Stadio Benito Mussolini; Attendance: 12,000; Referee: Alois Beranek (Austria)

3 June 1934 1934 World Cup Semi-final	Czechoslovakia	3–1	Germany	Rome, Kingdom of Italy
16:30 CET (UTC+01:00)	Nejedlý 21', 69', 80'	Report	Noack 62'	Stadium: Stadio Nazionale PNF; Attendance: 15,000; Referee: Rinaldo Barlassina (Italy)

10 June 1934 1934 FIFA World Cup Final	Italy	2–1 (a.e.t.)	Czechoslovakia	Rome, Kingdom of Italy
17:00 CET (UTC+01:00)	Orsi 81'; Schiavio 95'	Report	Puč 71'	Stadium: Stadio Nazionale PNF; Attendance: 55,000; Referee: Ivan Eklind (Sweden)

2 September 1934 Friendly	Czechoslovakia	3-1	Kingdom of Yugoslavia	Prague, Czechoslovakia
16:30 (+1:00)	Nejedlý 15'; Sobotka 16'; Junek 20'	Report	Sekulić 78'	Stadium: Stadion Letná; Attendance: 15,000; Referee: Mihály Iváncsics (Hungary)

23 September 1934 1933–35 Central European Cup	Austria	3-1	Czechoslovakia	Vienna, Austria
16:30 (+1:00)	Binder 4'; Vogl 31'	Report	Čech 59', 86'	Stadium: Praterstadion; Attendance: 50,000; Referee: Rinaldo Barlassina (Italy)

14 October 1934 1933–35 Central European Cup	Switzerland	2-2	Czechoslovakia	Geneva, Switzerland
15:00 (UTC+1:00)	Kielholz 14', 41'	Report	Nejedlý 45', 58'	Stadium: Stade des Charmilles; Attendance: 15,000; Referee: Walter Lewington (England)
Note: This was the 100th international match of the Czechoslovakia football team

==== 1935 ====
17 March 1935 1933–35 Central European Cup	Czechoslovakia	3-1	Switzerland	Prague, Czechoslovakia
15:15 (+2:00)	Horák 8'; Nejedlý 37', 89'	Report	Bösch 48'	Stadium: Stadion Letná; Attendance: 25,000; Referee: Peco Bauwens (Germany)

14 April 1935 1933–35 Central European Cup	Czechoslovakia	0-0	Austria	Prague, Czechoslovakia
16:00 (+1:00)		Report		Stadium: Stadion Letná; Attendance: 30,000; Referee: Rinaldo Barlassina (Italy)

26 May 1935 Friendly	Germany	2-1	Czechoslovakia	Dresden, Germany
16:00 (+1:00)	Lenz 12', 53'	Report	Hruška 51'	Stadium: Heinz-Steyer-Stadion; Attendance: 61,000; Referee: John Langenus (Belgium)

6 September 1935 Friendly	Yugoslavia	0-0	Czechoslovakia	Belgrade, Yugoslavia
15:00 (+1:00)		Report		Stadium: Beogradski SK Stadium; Attendance: 18,000; Referee: Peco Bauwens (Germany)

22 September 1935 1933–35 Central European Cup	Hungary	1-0	Czechoslovakia	Budapest, Hungary
16:00 (+1:00)	Markos 60'	Report		Stadium: Hungária körúti stadion Attendance: 22,000; Referee: John Langenus (Belgium)

27 October 1935 1933–35 Central European Cup	Czechoslovakia	2-1	Italy	Prague, Czechoslovakia
15:30 (+1:00)	Horák 52', 80'	Report	Pitto 75'	Stadium: Sportovní Stadion; Attendance: 8,000; Referee: Pedro Escartín (Spain)

==== 1936 ====
9 February 1936 Friendly	France	0-3	Czechoslovakia	Paris, France
14:30 (UTC+1:00)		Report	Puč 14'; Bouček 20'; Nejedlý 25'	Stadium: Parc des Princes; Attendance: 40,138; Referee: Pedro Escartín (Spain)
Note: Antonín Puč set the goal scoring record for Czechoslovakia (31 goals)

22 March 1936 1936–38 Central European Cup	Austria	1-1	Czechoslovakia	Vienna, Austria
16:00 (+1:00)	Bican 73' (pen.)	Report	Zajíček 59'	Stadium: Praterstadion; Attendance: 53,000; Referee: Francesco Mattea (Italy)

26 April 1936 Friendly	Czechoslovakia	1-0	Spain	Prague, Czechoslovakia
16:00 (UTC+1:00)	Zajíček 12' (pen.)	Report		Stadium: Stadion Letná; Attendance: 30,000; Referee: Peco Bauwens (Germany)

27 September 1936 Friendly	Czechoslovakia	1-2	Germany	Prague, Czechoslovakia
16:00 (UTC+1:00)	Čech 36'	Report	Elbern 60'; Siffling 80'	Stadium: Great Strahov Stadium; Attendance: 25,000; Referee: Otto Olsson (Sweden)

18 October 1936 1936–38 Central European Cup	Czechoslovakia	5-2	Hungary	Prague, Czechoslovakia
13:00 (UTC+1:00)	Kloz 27', 30', 79', 82'; Kopecký 87'	Report	Titkos 7'; Toldi 33'	Stadium: Stadion Letná; Attendance: 22,000; Referee: Walter Lewington (England)

13 December 1936 Friendly	Italy	2-0	Czechoslovakia	Genoa, Italy
15:00 (UTC+1:00)	Pasinati 40'; Ferrari 43'	Report		Stadium: Stadio Marassi; Attendance: 25,000; Referee: Adolf Miesz (Austria)

==== 1937 ====
21 February 1937 Friendly	Czechoslovakia	5-3	Switzerland	Prague, Czechoslovakia
15:00 (+1:00)	Kopecky 15', 43'; Svoboda 44'; Horak 50'; Puč 76'	Report	Wagner 18' (pen.); Bickel 55', 84'	Stadium: Stadion Letná; Attendance: 20,000; Referee: Lucien Leclercq (France)
Note: Antonín Puč set the goal scoring record for Czechoslovakia (32 goals)

18 April 1937 1937–38 Eduard Benes Cup	Romania	1-1	Czechoslovakia	Bucharest, Romania
16:30 (UTC+3:00)	Bodola 63'	Report	Nejedlý 81'	Stadium: Stadionul ONEF; Attendance: 29,500; Referee: Rinadlo Barlassina (Italy)

15 May 1937 Friendly	Czechoslovakia	1-3	Scotland	Prague, Czechoslovakia
17:15 (+1:00)	Puč 29'	Report	Simpson 14'; McPhail 31'; Gillick 73'	Stadium: Stadion Letná; Attendance: 35,000; Referee: Peco Bauwens (Germany)
Note: Antonín Puč set the goal scoring record for Czechoslovakia (33 goals)

23 May 1937 1936–38 Central European Cup	Czechoslovakia	0-1	Italy	Prague, Czechoslovakia
17:00 (+1:00)		Report	Piola 24'	Stadium: Stadion Letná; Attendance: 30,000; Referee: Peco Bauwens (Germany)

19 September 1937 1936–38 Central European Cup	Hungary	8-3	Czechoslovakia	Budapest, Hungary
16:00 (+1:00)	Zsengellér 15'; Sárosi 34', 51', 60', 62', 77', 80', 85'	Report	Riha 21'; Rulc 26'; Nejedlý 65'	Stadium: Hungaria uti Attendance: 27,000; Referee: Peco Bauwens (Germany)

3 October 1937 1937-1938 Eduard Benes Cup	Czechoslovakia	5-4	Yugoslavia	Prague, Czechoslovakia
15:15 (+1:00)	Rulc 5'; Říha 26'; Senecký 43'; Nejedlý 48'; Sobotka 79'	Report	Pleše 18', 50'; Valjarević 60'; Burgr 71' (o.g.)	Stadium: Stadion Letná; Attendance: 18,000; Referee: Alfred Birlem (Germany)

13 October 1937 Friendly	Czechoslovakia	4-0	Latvia	Prague, Czechoslovakia
12:00 (+1:00)	Piątek 3', 20'; Wostal 59'; Wilimowski 78'	Report		Stadium: Stadion Letná; Attendance: 5,000; Referee: Ota Dörfler (Czechoslovakia)

24 October 1937 1936–38 Central European Cup	Czechoslovakia	2-1	Austria	Prague, Czechoslovakia
15:00 (+1:00)	Říha 75'; Kloz 76'	Report	Neumer 18'	Stadium: Stadion Letná; Attendance: 35,000; Referee: Pál Hertzka (Hungary)

7 November 1937 1938 World Cup qualifying	Bulgaria	1-1	Czechoslovakia	Sofia, Bulgaria
15:00 (+2:00)	Panchediev 89' (pen.)	Report	Ríha 44'	Stadium: Junak Stadion; Attendance: 15,000; Referee: Rinaldo Barlassina (Italy)

1 December 1937 Friendly	England	5-4	Czechoslovakia	London, England
14:30	Crayston 10'; Morton 19'; Matthews 28', 55', 83'	Report	Puč 12'; Nejedlý 45', 75'; Zeman 60'	Stadium: White Hart Lane; Attendance: 45,879; Referee: John Langenus (Belgium)
Note: Antonín Puč set the goal scoring record for Czechoslovakia (34 goals)

8 December 1937 Friendly	Scotland	5-0	Czechoslovakia	Glasgow, Scotland
12:00 (+1:00)	Black 1'; McCulloch 29', 52'; Buchanan 40'; Kinnear 74'	Report		Stadium: Ibrox Stadium; Attendance: 41,000; Referee: Tommy Thompson (England)

==== 1938 ====
3 April 1938 1936–38 Central European Cup	Switzerland	4-0	Czechoslovakia	Basel, Switzerland
15:00 (+1:00)	Monnard 28'; Grassi 30'; Aeby 39'; Amado 80'	Report		Stadium: Stadion Rankhof; Attendance: 20,000; Referee: Reginald Rudd (England)

24 April 1938 1938 World Cup qualifying	Czechoslovakia	6-0	Bulgaria	Prague, Czechoslovakia
16:30 (+1:00)	Šimůnek 21', 79', 89'; Nejedlý 57', 77'; Ludl 73'	Report		Stadium: AC Sparta Stadion; Attendance: 28,000; Referee: Pál von Hertzka (Hungary)

18 May 1938 Friendly	Czechoslovakia	2-2	Republic of Ireland	Prague, Czechoslovakia
17:30 (+1:00)	Nejedlý 3', 46'	Report	Davis 42'; Dunne 90'	Stadium: Stadion Letná; Attendance: 17,000; Referee: John Langenus (Belgium)

5 June 1938 1938 World Cup Round of 16	Czechoslovakia	3–0 (a.e.t.)	Netherlands	Le Havre, France
18:30 WEST (UTC+01:00)	Košťálek 93'; Zeman 111'; Nejedlý 118'	Report		Stadium: Stade municipal Attendance: 11,000; Referee: Lucien Leclerq (France)

12 June 1938 1938 World Cup quarter-finals	Brazil	1–1 (a.e.t.)	Czechoslovakia	Bordeaux, France
17:00 WEST (UTC+01:00)	Leônidas 30'	Report	Nejedlý 65' (pen.)	Stadium: Parc Lescure; Attendance: 22,021; Referee: Pál von Hertzka (Hungary)

14 June 1938 1938 World Cup Quarter-finals replay	Brazil	2–1	Czechoslovakia	Bordeaux, France
18:00 WEST (UTC+01:00)	Leônidas 57'; Roberto 62'	Report	Kopecký 25'	Stadium: Parc Lescure; Attendance: 18,141; Referee: Georges Capdeville (France)

7 August 1938 Friendly	Sweden	2-6	Czechoslovakia	Solna, Sweden
18:30 (+1:00)	Bergström 54'; Nyberg 61'	Report	Horák 13'; Bican 28', 33', 75'; Senecký 72', 89'	Stadium: Råsunda Stadium; Attendance: 20,237; Referee: Georges Capdeville (France)

28 August 1938 1937-1938 Eduard Benes Cup	Yugoslavia	1–3	Czechoslovakia	Zagreb, Kingdom of Yugoslavia
16:00 (+1:00)	Sipos 56'	Report	Bradáč 19'; Bican 41'; Senecký 69'	Stadium: Stadion Concordije; Attendance: 10,000; Referee: Hans Wuthrich (Switzerland)

4 December 1938 1937-1938 Eduard Benes Cup	Czechoslovakia	6–2	Romania	Prague, Czechoslovakia
14:00 (+1:00)	Bican 28', 49', 61', 81'; Ludl 38'; Kopecký 78'	Report	25' Barátky; 26' Bodola	Stadium: Stadion Letná; Attendance: 13,000; Referee: Generoso Dattilo (Italy)

=== The Bohemia & Moravia national football team ===
==== 1939 ====
27 August 1939 Friendly	Bohemia and Moravia (Protectorate of Bohemia and Moravia)	7-3	Yugoslavia	Prague, Bohemia and Moravia
17:00 (+1:00)	Kopecký 10', 47', 55'; Ludl 18' (pen.), 80'; Říha 37' (pen.); Nejedlý 77'	Report	(?)	Stadium: Stadion Letná; Attendance: 12,000; Referee: Gustav Krist (Bohemia & Moravia)

12 November 1939 Friendly	Germany	4-4	(Protectorate of Bohemia and Moravia) Bohemia and Moravia	Wrocław, Poland
14:00 (+1:00)	Binder 30', 35', 53'; Janes 85' (pen.)	Report	Bican 6', 13', 40'; Puč 8'	Stadium: Stadion Olimpijski; Attendance: 35,000; Referee: Mika Popović (Yugoslavia)

== See also ==
- Czech Republic national football team results (1994–2019)
- Czech Republic national football team results (2020–present)
