= 1930 Mitropa Cup =

Tournament details
- Dates: 19 June – 12 November 1930
- Teams: 8

Final positions
- Champions: (Austria) Rapid Wien (1st title)
- Runners-up: (Czechoslovakia) Sparta Prague

Tournament statistics
- Matches played: 16
- Top scorer: (Italy) Giuseppe Meazza (7 goals)

The 1930 season of the Mitropa Cup football club tournament was won by Rapid Vienna in a two-legged final against Sparta Prague. This was the fourth edition of the tournament.

The holders, Újpesti FC, lost in the quarter-final against the Italian team AS Ambrosiana.

The final was played on 2 and 12 November 1930 in Prague and Vienna. The finalists Sparta Prague and Rapid Wien had played against each other in the 1927 Mitropa Cup final, with Sparta winning on aggregate 7–3. Rapid were playing in their third Mitropa Cup final in four years. Sparta lost at home 0–2, the first away victory in a Mitropa Cup final. Sparta's 3–2 away win, the second away victory in a Mitropa Cup final, meant that Rapid became the first Austrian club to win this tournament. Giuseppe Meazza from AS Ambrosia was top scorer in the tournament with seven goals. Josef Košťálek scored all three of Sparta Prague's goals in the final.

The semi-finals and both legs of the final were refereed by Sophus Hansen of Denmark.

== Quarterfinals ==
Team 1	Agg.	Team 2	1st leg	2nd leg
Slavia Prague (Czechoslovakia)	2–3	(Hungary) Ferencváros	2–2	0–1
Sparta Prague (Czechoslovakia)	5–3	(Austria) First Vienna	2–1	3–2
Genova 1893 (Italy)	2–7	(Austria) Rapid Wien	1–1	1–6
Újpest (Hungary)	6–6^{a}	(Italy) Ambrosiana Inter	2–4	4–2

- ^{a} Match decided by play off.

=== Play-offs ===
Team 1	Score	Team 2
Újpest (Hungary)	1–1	(Italy) Ambrosiana Inter
Újpest (Hungary)	3–5	(Italy) Ambrosiana Inter

== Semifinals ==
Team 1	Agg.	Team 2	1st leg	2nd leg
Ambrosiana Inter (Italy)	3–8	(Czechoslovakia) Sparta Prague	2–2	1–6
Rapid Wien (Austria)	5–2	(Hungary) Ferencváros	5–1	0–1

== Finals ==
Team 1	Agg.	Team 2	1st leg	2nd leg
Sparta Prague (Czechoslovakia)	3–4	(Austria) Rapid Wien	0–2	3–2

=== 1st leg ===
November 2, 1930

Sparta	0 – 2	Rapid
		Luef 9'; Wesely 57'

Stadion Letná (Praha)
Attendance: 25,000
Referee: Sophus Hansen (Denmark)

ATHLETIC CLUB SPARTA:
GK	(Czechoslovakia) Ladislav Bělík
DF	(Czechoslovakia) Jaroslav Burgr
DF	(Czechoslovakia) Antonín Hojer
MF	(Czechoslovakia) Jan Knobloch 'Madelon'
MF	(Czechoslovakia) Karel Pesek (c)
MF	(Czechoslovakia) Erich Srbek
FW	(Austria) Adolf Patek
FW	(Czechoslovakia) Josef Košťálek
FW	(Belgium) Raymond Braine
FW	(Czechoslovakia) Josef Silný
FW	(Czechoslovakia) Karel Hejma
Manager:
(Scotland) John Dick

SPORTKLUB RAPID:
GK	(Austria) Josef Bugala
DF	(Austria) Roman Schramseis
DF	(Austria) Leopold Czejka
MF	(Austria) Karl Rappan
MF	(Austria) Josef Smistik
MF	(Austria) Johann Vana
FW	(Austria) Willibald Kirbes
FW	(Austria) Franz Weselik
FW	(Austria) Matthias Kaburek
FW	(Austria) Johann Luef
FW	(Austria) Ferdinand Wesely (c)
Manager:
(Austria) Edi Bauer

=== 2nd leg ===
November 11, 1930

Rapid	2 – 3	Sparta
Kaburek 7'; Smistik 67'		Košťálek 25', 27', 87'

Hohe Warte (Wien)
Attendance: 40,000
Referee: Sophus Hansen (Denmark)

SPORTKLUB RAPID:
GK	(Austria) Josef Bugala
DF	(Austria) Roman Schramseis
DF	(Austria) Leopold Czejka
MF	(Austria) Karl Rappan
MF	(Austria) Josef Smistik
MF	(Austria) Johann Vana
FW	(Austria) Willibald Kirbes
FW	(Austria) Franz Weselik
FW	(Austria) Matthias Kaburek
FW	(Austria) Johann Luef
FW	(Austria) Ferdinand Wesely (c)
Manager:
(Austria) Edi Bauer

ATHLETIC CLUB SPARTA:
GK	(Czechoslovakia) Ladislav Bělík
DF	(Czechoslovakia) Jaroslav Burgr
DF	(Czechoslovakia) Josef Čtyřoký
MF	(Czechoslovakia) Jan Knobloch 'Madelon'
MF	(Czechoslovakia) Karel Pesak (c)
MF	(Czechoslovakia) Erich Srbek
FW	(Czechoslovakia) Karel Podrazil
FW	(Czechoslovakia) Josef Košťálek
FW	(Belgium) Raymond Braine
FW	(Czechoslovakia) Josef Silný
FW	(Czechoslovakia) Karel Hejma
Manager:
(Scotland) John Dick

1930 Mitropa Cup Champions

Rapid Wien
1st Title

== Top goalscorers ==
Rank	Player	Team	Goals
1	(Italy) Giuseppe Meazza	(Italy) AS Ambrosiana	7
2	(Czechoslovakia) Josef Košťálek	(Czechoslovakia) Sparta Prague	6
3	(Belgium) Raymond Braine	(Czechoslovakia) Sparta Prague	4
3	(Austria) Matthias Kaburek	(Austria) Rapid Wien	4
3	(Austria) Ferdinand Wesely	(Austria) Rapid Wien	4
3	(Hungary) Stefan Auer	(Hungary) Újpest	4
