= Kladno =

City in the Czech Republic

- Statutory city
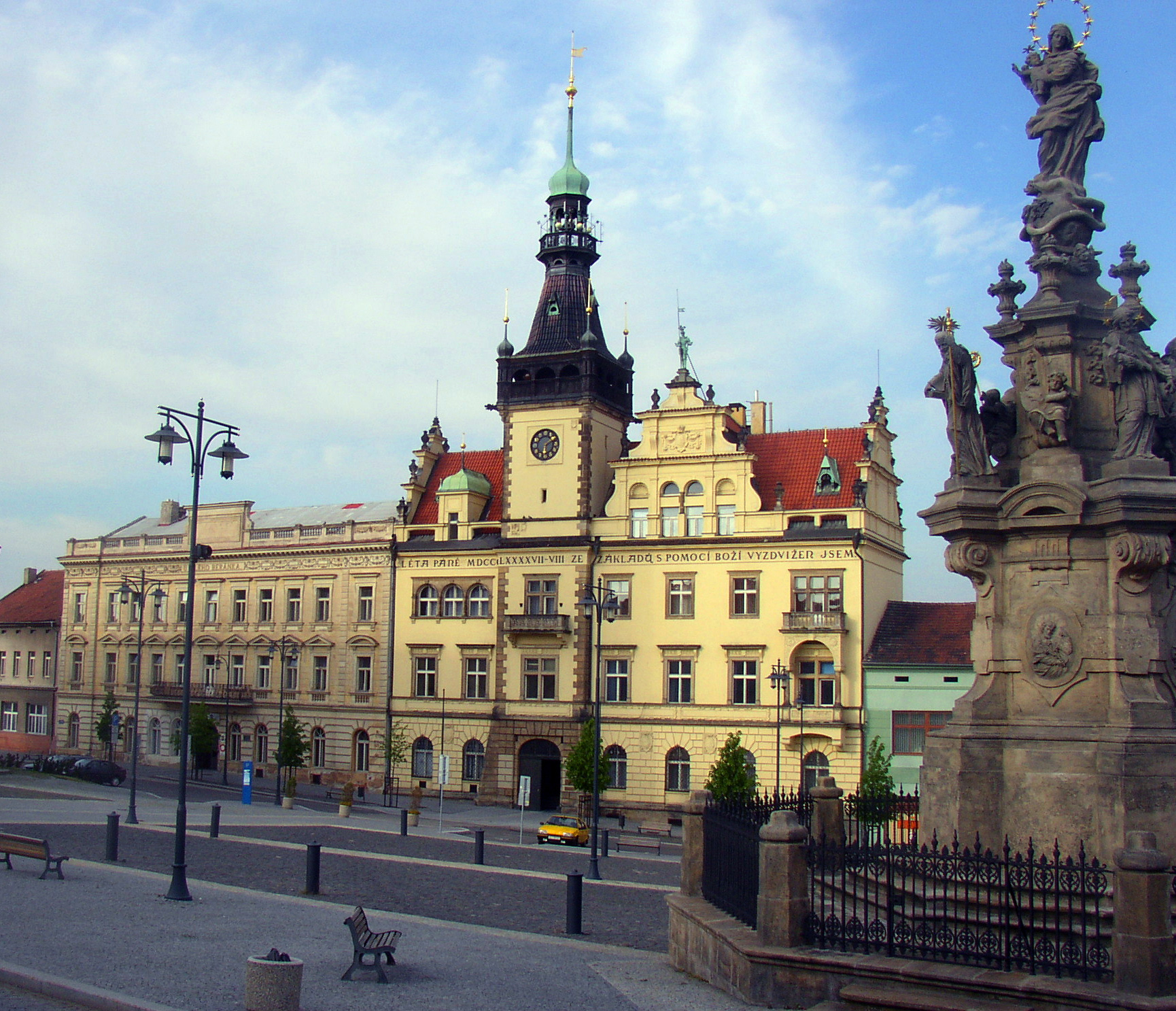
- City hall and Marian sculpture group

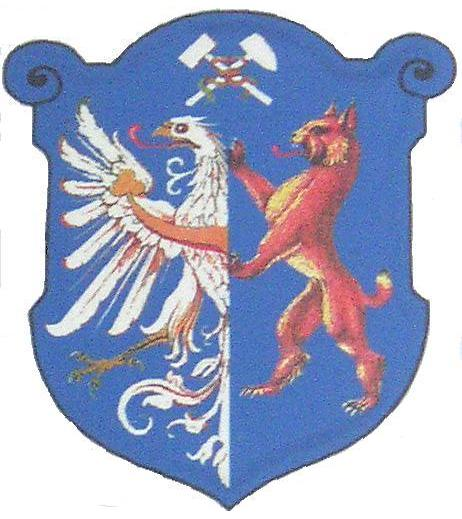
- Flag Coat of arms

- Location in the Czech Republic
- Coordinates: 50°8′35″N 14°6′19″E
- Country: Czech Republic
- Region: Central Bohemian
- District: Kladno
- First mentioned: 1318

Government
  - Mayor: Milan Volf (Volba pro Kladno)

Area
  - Total: 36.97 km^{2} (14.27 sq mi)
- Elevation: 381 m (1,250 ft)

Population (2026-01-01)
  - Total: 69,728
  - Density: 1,886/km^{2} (4,885/sq mi)
- Time zone: UTC+1 (CET)
  - Summer (DST): UTC+2 (CEST)
- Postal code: 272 01, 272 03, 272 04
- Website: www.mestokladno.cz

Kladno (Czech pronunciation: [ˈkladno]; German: Kladen) is a city in the Central Bohemian Region of the Czech Republic. It has about 70,000 inhabitants, making it the largest city in the region. It lies near Prague, mainly in the flat landscape of the Prague Plateau.

Kladno has a rich industrial history and is still known primarily for its industry. From the mid-19th century, bituminous coal was mined in the area around the city, which led to the rapid growth of the city and the emergence of the steel industry. Kladno is considered the cradle of heavy industry in Bohemia. The city is a railway junction.

== Administrative division ==
Kladno consists of six municipal parts (in brackets population according to the 2021 census):

- Kladno (22,585)
- Dubí (2,059)
- Kročehlavy (34,972)
- Rozdělov (2,678)
- Švermov (5,038)
- Vrapice (424)

== Etymology ==
The name Kladno is derived from the Czech word kláda, meaning 'log'. In Old Czech, the word kladno denoted a mature forest from which logs were obtained.

== Geography ==
Kladno is located about 17 kilometres (11 mi) northwest of Prague. It lies in a mostly flat landscape of the Prague Plateau, albeit in the north the terrain becomes hillier. The highest point is at 434 m (1,424 ft) above sea level, and the lowest at 283 m (928 ft) above sea level. There are no large bodies of water within city limits, only several small streams. The city limits contain two nature monuments: Žraločí zuby and Krnčí a Voleška.

== History ==
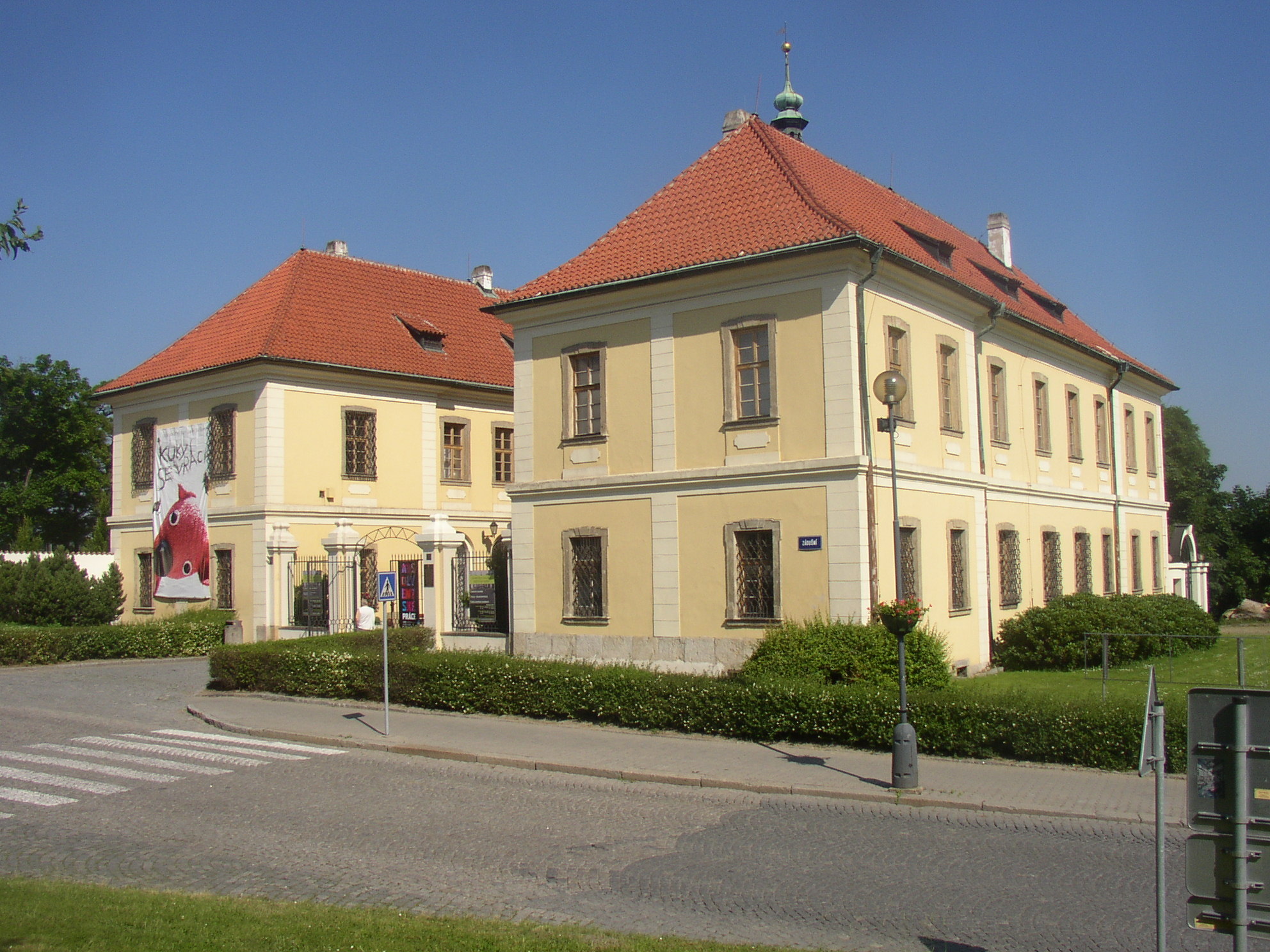
Kladno Castle

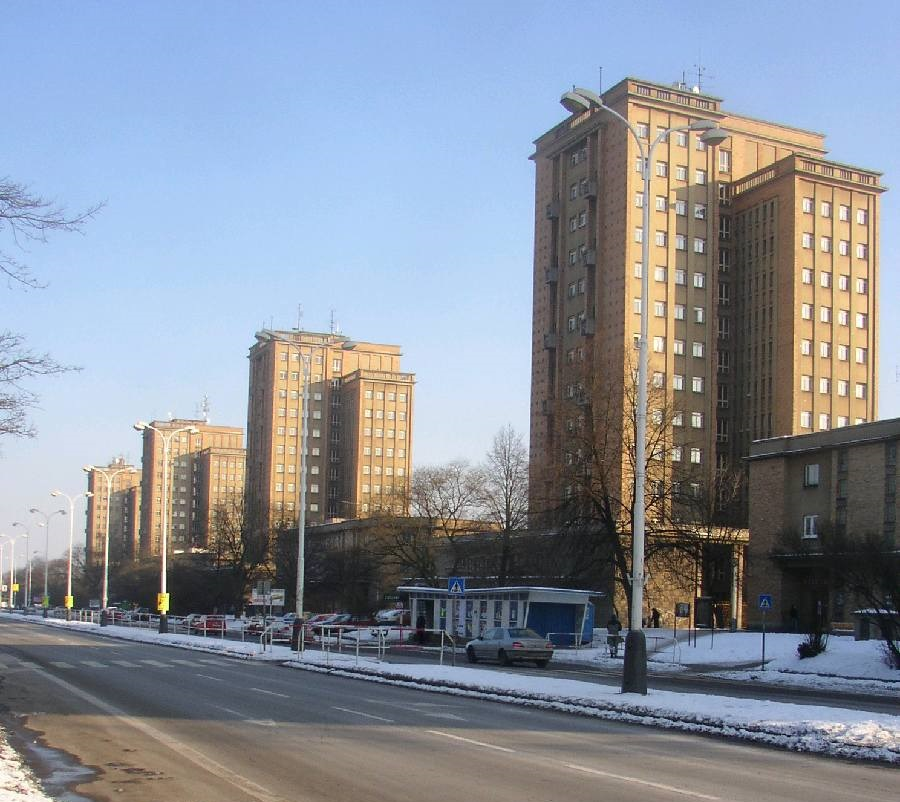
Housing estates in Rozdělov, built in the 1950s

The first written mention of Kladno is from 1318, when it was a property of the Kladenský of Kladno noble family. After 1543, when the Kladenský of Kladno family died out, it became a property of the Žďárský of Žďár family. In 1561, the settlement was granted the town status.

In 1566, the Žďárskýs of Žďár rebuilt the local fort into a Renaissance castle. The town walls were built in the following decades. The town prospered until the Battle of White Mountain in 1620, when it was looted by Polish Cossacks. However, during the rule of Florián Jetřich Žďárský, the town began to prosper again. After the Bohemian branch of the Ždárský family died out in 1670, the town changed hands several times before it was bought by the Benedictine Břevnov Monastery in 1705.

In the 18th century, the town began to expand beyond its walls. In 19th century, the town developed into a significant agricultural and industrial centre. Bituminous coal was first discovered within the present city limits in 1775, but significant mining activity only started in 1850 and intensified over the following decades. In 1855–1856, the city was connected to the railway network. The coal reserves began attracting the iron working industry, the largest of which eventually became the Poldi steelworks, founded in 1899. The growth of industrial activity spurred a massive population growth. In 1870, Kladno was promoted to a city by Emperor Franz Joseph I, and in 1898 it was awarded the honorary title of "royal mining town".

Until 1918, Kladno was head of the Kladno district in Austria-Hungary, one of the 94 Bezirkshauptmannschaften in Bohemia. In the 20th century, the city was one of the centres of the Czech labour movement, with frequent strikes, protests and labour action.

The city's prosperity was once again interrupted by World War II, when it was ruled by the Nazis. In 1941, several surrounding municipalities (Kročehlavy, Rozdělov, Dubí, Dříň and Újezd) were annexed to Kladno. Vrapice was annexed in 1950 and the town of Švermov in 1980.

The post-war history of Kladno was influenced by the philosophy of the communist regime. The city's development was determined by migration of labour forces unrelated to the city, by the construction of unified large housing estates and by an effort to erase the original buildings of the city centre. The focus on industrial production resulted in environmental damages. On 21 August 1968, Kladno was occupied for the second time in thirty years, this time by the Soviet Army.

After the socialist regime fell in 1989, Kladno struggled to adapt to a market economy. The operations of previously prosperous companies were terminated. In 2000, Kladno became a statutory city.

== Demographics ==
Historical population

Year	Pop.	±%
1869	16,421	—
1880	23,863	+45.3%
1890	32,079	+34.4%
1900	42,521	+32.6%
1910	49,668	+16.8%

Year	Pop.	±%
1921	48,941	−1.5%
1930	51,249	+4.7%
1950	50,470	−1.5%
1961	55,919	+10.8%
1970	63,076	+12.8%

Year	Pop.	±%
1980	71,141	+12.8%
1991	71,753	+0.9%
2001	71,132	−0.9%
2011	68,103	−4.3%
2021	67,756	−0.5%

Source: Censuses

== Economy ==
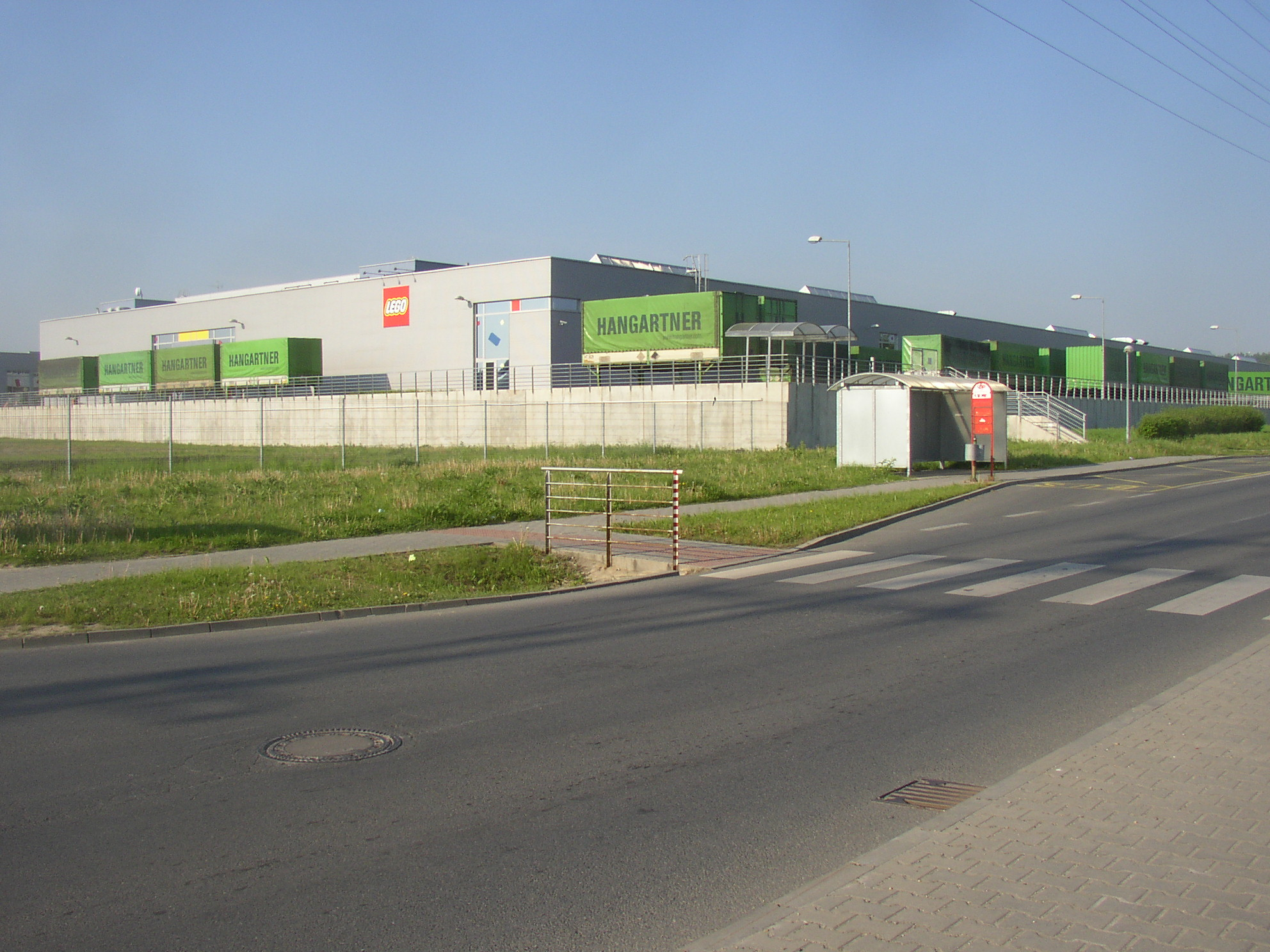
Lego factory

Kladno was one of the historical birthplaces of heavy industry in Bohemia. For years, the city was home to the Poldi steel factory, the region's largest employer. Since economic restructuring in the 1990s, the heavy industry has largely been replaced by services and light industry.

A number of companies has established production in Kladno, including Lego, NKT Cables, La Lorraine, Hanon Systems and Dr. Oetker. Lego is one of the largest employers in the region with more than 3,000 employees.

== Transport ==
Kladno is a railway junction, located on the railway lines Prague–Kralupy nad Vltavou and Kladno–Rakovník. The city is served by six stations and stops.

== Sport ==
The city is known as the home of many internationally known ice hockey players, such as Jaromír Jágr and Tomáš Plekanec. Its ice hockey club, Rytíři Kladno, was successful in the past and is connected with many famous players of Czech ice hockey history, including 1998 Olympic gold medalists Jaromír Jágr, Pavel Patera, Martin Procházka, Libor Procházka and Milan Hnilička. The club plays in the top tier, with Jaromír Jágr as its owner and president.

Kladno is home to the football club SK Kladno, which plays its matches at the Stadion Františka Kloze stadium. The club played in the Czech First League in 2006–2010.

The city hosts various athletic events including the TNT – Fortuna Meeting in June, and the Kladno Marathon in September each year.

== Sights ==
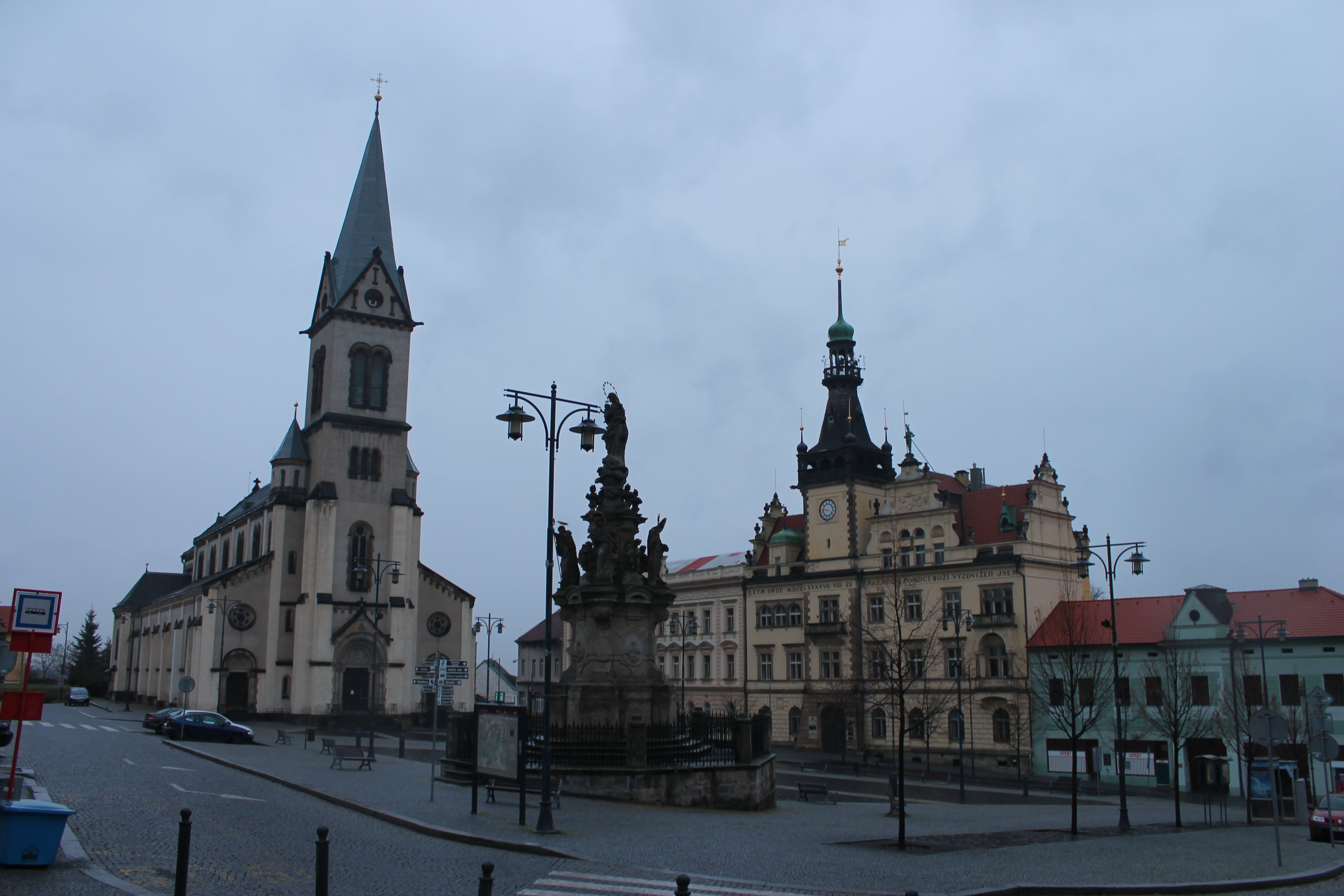
Náměstí starosty Pavla

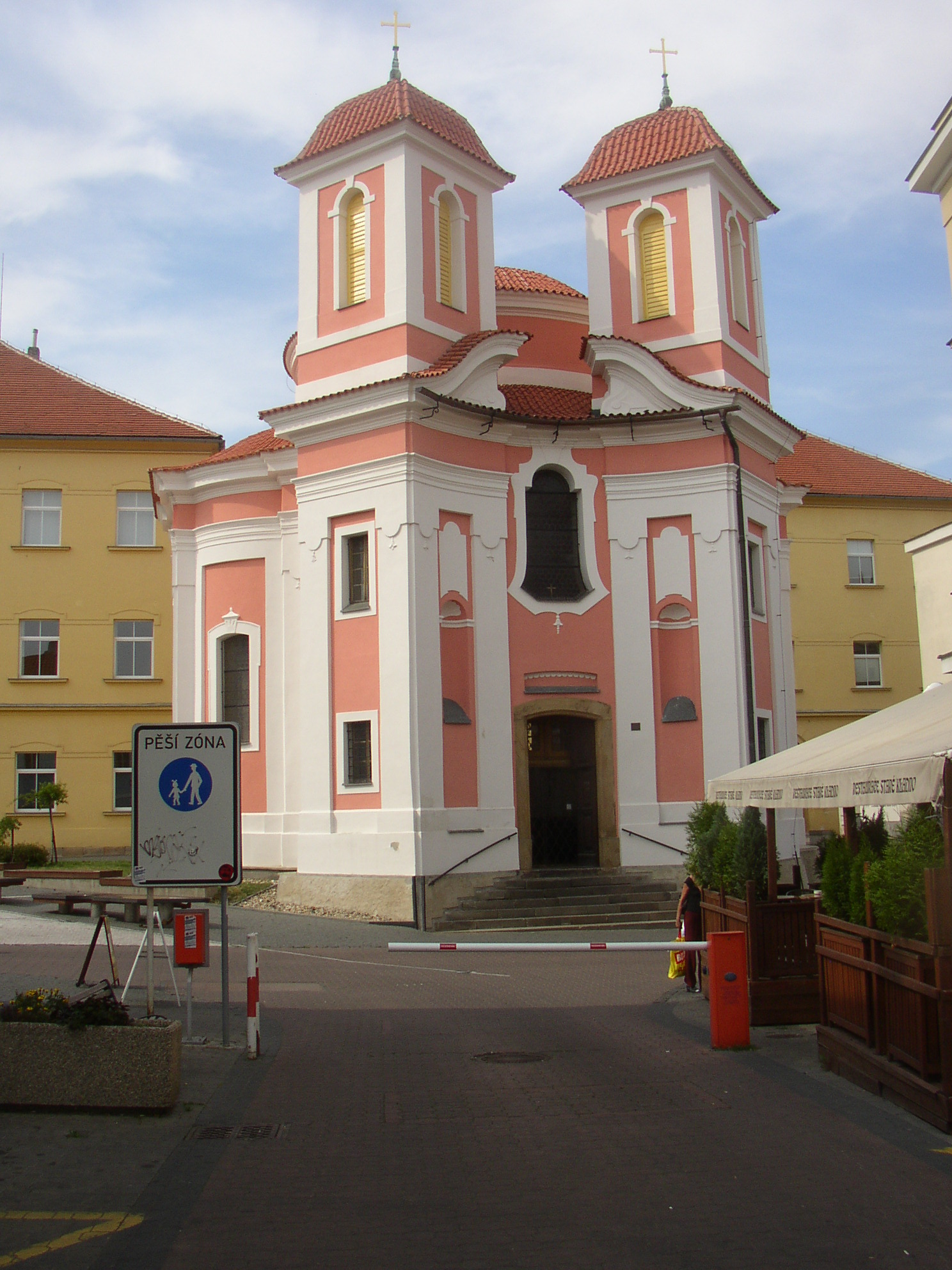
Chapel of Saint Florian

The Kladno Castle was originally a Gothic fortress, rebuilt in the Renaissance style in the 1560s, then completely rebuilt into a Baroque castle in 1737–1740 by the architect Kilian Ignaz Dientzenhofer. Today it houses a museum and art gallery. Next to the castle is a castle park with a beararium built in 2001.

There are several major landmarks of Kladno on the square Náměstí starosty Pavla. The Church of the Assumption of the Virgin Mary was built in the Neo-Romanesque style in 1897–1899. It was built on the site of a Gothic church from the 1350s. The city hall is a Neo-Renaissance house, which was built in 1897–1898. The Marian sculpture group was created according to the design by K. I. Dietzenhofer in 1739–1741. This late Baroque columns stands on the site where the pillory used to be. Notable is also the Archdeaconry building, originally a rectory built in 1804–1807.

The Chapel of Saint Florian is a significant Baroque chapel. It is the last project of K. I. Dietzenhofer before his death. The construction started in 1751 and after being interrupted, it was completed in 1827.

The former synagogue is a Neo-Renaissance building from 1884. Today it serves as a prayer house of the Czechoslovak Hussite Church.

There are four churches in the local parts of Kladno. The Church of Saint John the Baptist in Dubí was originally a Gothic church, first documented in 1352. In 1861, it was rebuilt into its current form with a neo-Gothic tower. It is a pilgrimage site. The Church of Saint Nicholas in Vrapice was a Romanesque rotunda from the early 13th century, rebuilt in the Gothic style around 1400. It was then rebuilt and extended in 1858. The Church of Saint Wenceslaus in Rozdělov is modern, built in 1925–1927. The Church of Saint Nicholas in Švermov, built in 1912–1913, is a mixture of Art Nouveau and Modernism.

== Notable people ==
- Anton Cermak (1873–1933), mayor of Chicago in 1931–1933
- Antonin Raymond (1888–1976), Czech-American architect
- Cyril Bouda (1901–1984), painter and graphic artist
- Josef Košťálek (1909–1971), footballer
- Václav Horák (1912–2000), footballer
- Karel Kolský (1914–1984, football player and manager
- Luděk Pešek (1919–1999), artist and novelist
- Zdeněk Miler (1921–2011), animator and illustrator
- Antonín Kachlík (1923–2022), film director and screenwriter
- Jiří Dienstbier (1937–2011), politician and journalist
- Petr Pithart (born 1941), politician, Prime Minister in 1990–1992
- Michal Pivoňka (born 1966), ice hockey player
- Jiří Dienstbier Jr. (born 1969), politician
- Jaromír Jágr (born 1972), ice hockey player
- František Kaberle (born 1973), ice hockey player
- Tomáš Plekanec (born 1982), ice hockey player
- Michael Frolík (born 1988), ice hockey player
- Jakub Voráček (born 1989), ice hockey player
- Radko Gudas (born 1990), ice hockey player
- Jiří Sekáč (born 1992), ice hockey player
- Marek Alscher (born 2004), ice hockey player

== Twin towns – sister cities ==
Kladno is twinned with:

- Bellevue, United States
- Vitry-sur-Seine, France
