= Korb (disambiguation) =

Korb is a municipality in Baden-Württemberg, Germany

Korb can also refer to:

- KORB, radio station in California, United States
- Korb River, river in Minnesota, United States

== People with the name ==
- Anu Korb (born 1950), Estonian folklorist
- Arthur Korb (1909–2003), American songwriter
- Chris Korb (born 1987), American soccer player
- Darren Korb (born 1983), American songwriter
- Flóris Korb (1860–1930), Hungarian architect
- Hans-Henning Korb (born 1988), German artist
- Judith Korb (born 1967), German evolutionary biologist and ecologist
- Julian Korb (born 1992), German footballer
- Kristin Korb, American jazz singer and double-bassist
- Lawrence Korb (1939–2026), American defense specialist
- Pierre Korb (1908–1980), French footballer
- Ron Korb (born 1961), Canadian flautist
- Sascha Korb (born 1983), German footballer
- Valeri Korb (born 1954), Estonian politician

== See also ==
- Kaie Kõrb (born 1961), Estonian ballerina
