= Josef Kratochvíl (footballer) =

Czech footballer

Personal information
- Date of birth: 9 February 1905
- Place of birth: Kladno, Austria-Hungary
- Date of death: 8 July 1984 (aged 79)
- Place of death: Czechoslovakia
- Position: Striker

Senior career*
| Years | Team | Apps | (Gls) |
| 1925–1926 | Slavia Prague | | |
| 1927 | Kladno | | (6) |
| 1927–1930 | Slavia Prague | | |
| 1930 | Teplitzer FK | | |
| 1930–1931 | Kladno | | |
| 1931–1932 | Basel | 1 | (0) |

International career
| 1925–1930 | Czechoslovakia | 20 | (4) |
- * Club domestic league appearances and goals

Josef Kratochvíl (9 February 1905 – 8 July 1984) was a Czech footballer. He played 20 games and scored 4 goals for the Czechoslovakia national football team. He was also part of Czechoslovakia's squad at the 1924 Olympics, but he did not play in any matches.

At the end of his active football career Kratochvíl moved to Switzerland in 1931. He joined FC Basel's first team during their 1931–32 season soon after Otto Haftl had taken over as coach. Haftl and Kratochvíl had played together for Teplitzer FK in 1930. Kratochvíl played just two matches for Basel, the first being the test match on New Year's Day 1932 as the team lost 3–4 against Freiburger FC. Kratochvíl also played one domestic league match for the club, this being the home game in the Landhof on 24 January as Basel were defeated 0–3 by Zürich.

== Sources ==
- Rotblau: Jahrbuch Saison 2014/2015. Publisher: FC Basel Marketing AG. ISBN 978-3-7245-2027-6
- Die ersten 125 Jahre. Publisher: Josef Zindel im Friedrich Reinhardt Verlag, Basel. ISBN 978-3-7245-2305-5
- Verein "Basler Fussballarchiv" Homepage
