= Johann Vana =

Austrian footballer

Johann Vanna
Personal information
- Date of birth: 6 December 1908
- Place of birth: Vienna
- Date of death: 4 November 1950
- Place of death: Žatec
- Position: Midfielder

Senior career*
Years	Team	Apps	(Gls)
1928–1930	Hertha Wien	26	(5)
1930–1931	Rapid	14	(0)
1931–1934	DSV Saaz		
1934–1935	Viktoria Plzeň		
1935–1936	DSV Saaz	25	(0)
1935–1936	Strasbourg	9	(0)
1936–1937	Nancy		
- * Club domestic league appearances and goals

Johann Vanna (6 December 1908 – 4 November 1950) was an Austrian former footballer.

== Career statistics ==
Appearances and goals by club, season and competition
Club	Season	Division	League		Cup		Other		Total	
Club	Season	Division	Apps	Goals	Apps	Goals	Apps	Goals	Apps	Goals
Hertha Wien	1928-29	Austrian championship	11	4	—		—		11	4
Hertha Wien	1929-30	Austrian championship	15	1	—		—		15	1
Hertha Wien	Total		26	5	—		—		26	5
Rapid Wien	1930-31	Austrian championship	14	0	9 (Note: Appearances in the Austrian Cup)	0	5 (Note: Appearances in the Mitropa Cup)	0	28	0
Rapid Wien	Total		14	0	9	0	5	0	28	0
Strasbourg	1935-36	French Division 1	9	0	4 (Note: Appearances in the Coupe de France)	1	—		13	1
Strasbourg	Total		9	0	4	1	—		13	1
