= Kročehlavy =

Neighborhood of Kladno

- Municipal part of Kladno
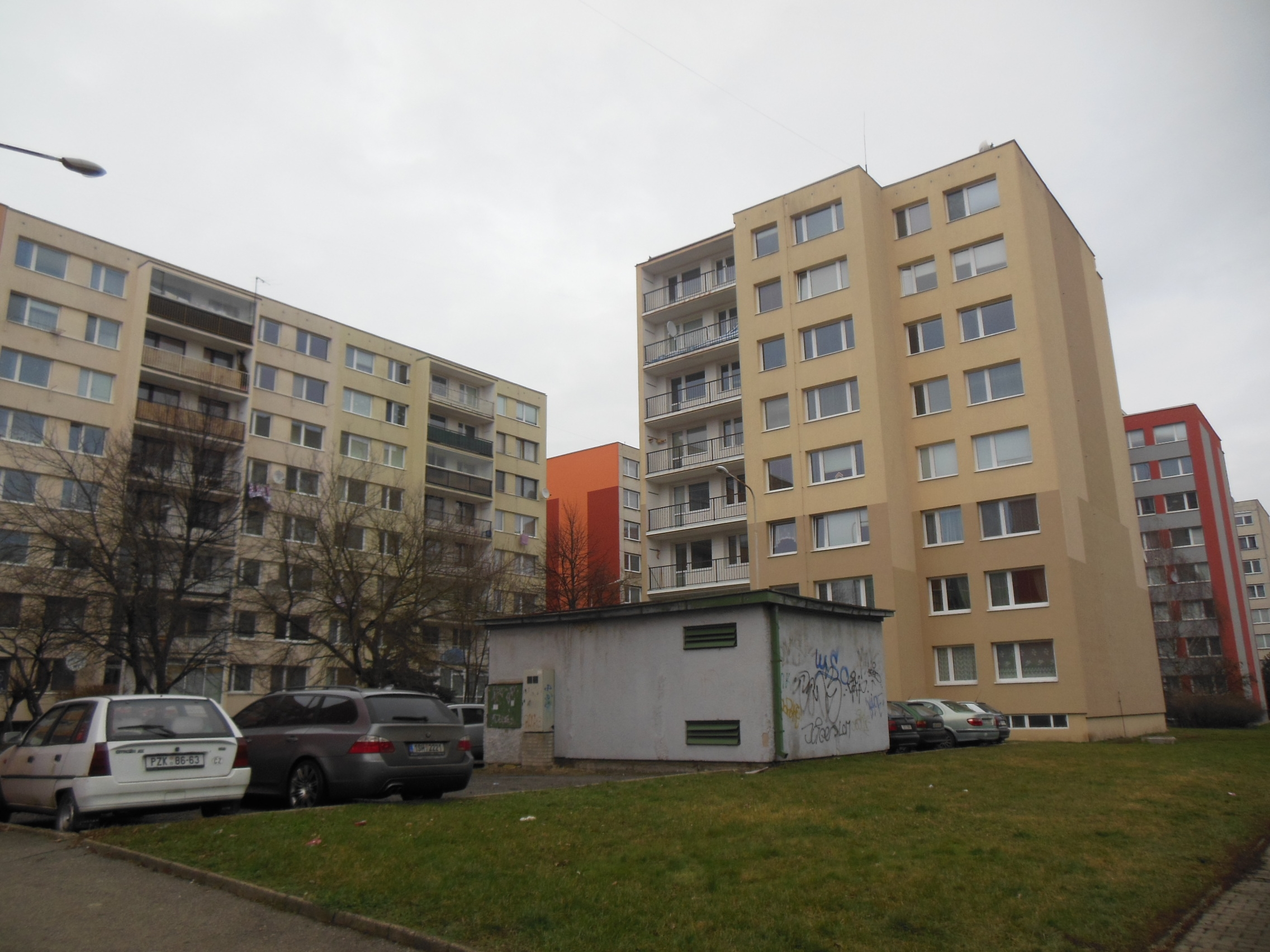
- V Bažantnici street
- Interactive map of Kročehlavy
- Coordinates: 50°08′N 14°07′E
- Country: Czech Republic
- Region: Central Bohemian
- District: Kladno
- Municipality: Kladno

Area
  - Total: 7.75 km^{2} (2.99 sq mi)

Population (2021)
  - Total: 34,972
  - Density: 4,510/km^{2} (11,700/sq mi)
- Time zone: UTC+1 (CET)
  - Summer (DST): UTC+2 (CEST)
- Postal code: 272 01

Kročehlavy is a municipal part of the city of Kladno, Czech Republic. It has about 35,000 inhabitants.

In history, Kročehlavy was a stand-alone village. The first mention of Kročehlavy, dating back to 1316, is found in local records relating to a member of lower Czech nobility, Zdeněk Kladenský from Kladno.

Prior to the 19th century, the population Kročehlavy was about 130 people. After the growth of coal mining and metallurgic industry the population soared multiple times. Kročehlavy was first merged with Kladno in 1938, which lasted for a few years. They merged again in 1948 and remain so to this day.

== Demographics ==
Historical population

Year	Pop.	±%
1869	1,784	—
1880	3,418	+91.6%
1890	5,411	+58.3%
1900	7,664	+41.6%
1910	10,108	+31.9%
1921	10,472	+3.6%
1930	11,434	+9.2%
1950	10,759	−5.9%

Year	Pop.	±%
1961	15,757	+46.5%
1970	27,088	+71.9%
1980	40,536	+49.6%
1991	41,195	+1.6%
2001	39,235	−4.8%
2011	36,123	−7.9%
2021	34,972	−3.2%

Source: Censuses

== Notable people ==
- Karel Kolský, football coach
- Josef Košťálek, footballer
- Václav Horák, footballer
