= Senecký =

Senecký is a surname. Notable people with the surname include:

- Karel Senecký (1919–1979), Czech footballer
- Štefan Senecký (born 1980), Slovak footballer
