= Erich Srbek =

Czech footballer and coach (1908–73)

Personal information
- Date of birth: 4 June 1908
- Place of birth: Prague, Austria-Hungary
- Date of death: 24 February 1973 (aged 64)
- Position: Midfielder

Senior career*
Years	Team	Apps	(Gls)
–1930	DFC Prague		
1930–1937	Sparta Prague	105	(2)

International career
1930–1936	Czechoslovakia	14	(0)

Managerial career
- 1948–1953: Sparta Prague
- 1957–1958: Sparta Prague
Medal record
Representing Czechoslovakia
Men's Football
FIFA World Cup
Runner-up	1934 Italy
- * Club domestic league appearances and goals

Erich Srbek (4 June 1908 – 24 February 1973) was an Ethnic German football player from Czechoslovakia. He played for several clubs, including DFC Praha, Sparta Prague and Viktoria Žižkov.

He played 14 matches for the Czechoslovakia national team and was a participant at the 1934 FIFA World Cup.

Srbek later worked as a football coach.
