= František Junek =

Czech footballer

Personal information
- Date of birth: 17 January 1907
- Place of birth: Karlín, Austria-Hungary
- Date of death: 19 March 1970 (aged 63)
- Place of death: Prague, Czechoslovakia
- Position: Striker

Youth career
- –1925: Čechie Karlín

Senior career*
Years	Team	Apps	(Gls)
1925–1928	Čechie Karlín		
1928–1935	Slavia Prague		
1935–1938	SK Kladno		

International career
1929–1934	Czechoslovakia	32	(7)
Medal record
Representing Czechoslovakia
Men's Football
FIFA World Cup
Runner-up	1934 Italy
- * Club domestic league appearances and goals

František Junek (17 January 1907 – 19 March 1970) was a Czech football player who played for SK Slavia Praha and the Czechoslovakia national team. He was capped 32 times for Czechoslovakia, scoring seven goals, and was a participant at the 1934 FIFA World Cup, where he played all four matches.
