= Jan Starý =

Czech ice hockey player

Jan Stary
- Born: February 7, 1986 (age 40) Pardubice, Czechoslovakia
- Height: 6 ft 1 in (185 cm)
- Weight: 194 lb (88 kg; 13 st 12 lb)
- Position: Winger
- Shot: Left
- team Former teams: Free agent HC Dynamo Pardubice
- National team: Czech Republic
- Playing career: 2004–2021

Jan Stary (born February 7, 1986) is a Czech professional ice hockey player. He is a free agent having last played for LHK Jestřábi Prostějov of the Chance Liga.

He previously played with HC Pardubice in the Czech Extraliga.

== Career statistics ==
			Regular season					Playoffs
Season	Team	League	GP	G	A	Pts	PIM	GP	G	A	Pts	PIM
2000–01	HC Pardubice U18	Czech U18	26	4	6	10	20	7	1	0	1	4
2001–02	HC Pardubice U18	Czech U18	38	21	19	40	42	6	3	3	6	2
2002–03	HC Pardubice U18	Czech U18	14	12	7	19	28	—	—	—	—	—
2002–03	HC Pardubice U20	Czech U20	22	2	6	8	4	—	—	—	—	—
2003–04	HC Pardubice U20	Czech U20	47	10	10	20	54	—	—	—	—	—
2004–05	HC Pardubice	Czech U20	32	7	22	29	73	1	1	0	1	0
2004–05	HC Pardubice	Czech	4	0	1	1	0	—	—	—	—	—
2005–06	HC Pardubice	Czech	9	0	1	1	0	—	—	—	—	—
2005–06	KLH Vajgar Jindřichův Hradec U20	Czech U20 2	—	—	—	—	—	—	—	—	—	—
2005–06	KLH Vajgar Jindřichův Hradec	Czech2	24	2	1	3	10	—	—	—	—	—
2006–07	HC Pardubice	Czech	30	1	1	2	2	4	0	0	0	0
2006–07	HC Hradec Králové	Czech2	18	7	5	12	10	4	3	1	4	2
2007–08	HC Pardubice	Czech	39	8	2	10	24	—	—	—	—	—
2007–08	HC Hradec Kralove	Czech2	9	2	2	4	4	5	3	0	3	25
2008–09	HC Pardubice	Czech	47	25	11	36	24	6	2	0	2	12
2009–10	HC Pardubice	Czech	46	15	12	27	10	8	5	2	7	4
2010–11	HC Pardubice	Czech	47	12	10	22	34	9	5	4	9	8
2011–12	HC Pardubice	Czech	50	19	19	38	76	19	7	6	13	6
2012–13	HC Pardubice	Czech	38	5	6	11	30	5	0	0	0	0
2013–14	HC Pardubice	Czech	18	1	5	6	2	—	—	—	—	—
2013–14	BK Mlada Boleslav	Czech2	30	6	8	14	10	2	0	0	0	0
2014–15	HC Pardubice	Czech	41	9	6	15	22	9	3	1	4	4
2015–16	HC Dynamo Pardubice	Czech	16	3	0	3	6	—	—	—	—	—
2016–17	HC Dynamo Pardubice	Czech	21	0	2	2	4	—	—	—	—	—
2016–17	SC Kolin	Czech3	2	0	0	0	0	—	—	—	—	—
2017–18	HC Dynamo Pardubice	Czech	14	1	3	4	0	—	—	—	—	—
2017–18	LHK Jestřábi Prostějov	Czech2	26	14	9	23	4	6	2	0	2	2
2018–19	LHK Jestřábi Prostějov	Czech2	53	11	19	30	18	7	2	3	5	2
2019–20	HC Trutnov	Czech3	24	10	13	23	14	3	3	1	4	2
2019–20	AZ Havirov	Czech2	18	2	2	4	4	—	—	—	—	—
2020–21	HC Trutnov	Czech3	3	0	1	1	2	—	—	—	—	—
Czech totals			420	99	79	178	234	75	25	13	38	38
