= Hans-Henning Korb =

German contemporary artist

- Born: Hans-Henning Korb; 1988 (age 37–38); Berlin, Germany
- Known for: Installation art, Performance art

Hans-Henning Korb (born 1988 in Berlin, Germany) is a contemporary artist based in Berlin. Hans-Henning Korb holds a BFA and an MFA in visual arts from the Berlin University of the Arts, in Berlin. He studied in the class of Hito Steyerl and at the Olafur Eliasson's Institute for Spatial Experiments (Institut für Raumexperimente)., and was a visiting student at the School of Fine Arts at the Addis Ababa University in Ethiopia and the Hunter College in New York City. His work has been exhibited internationally, in venues such as the Empty Gallery, Hong Kong (2016); Neue Nationalgalerie, Berlin, Germany (2014); Photo LA, Los Angeles, CA, United States (2012); and many more.

== Art ==
Hans-Henning Korb has developed a mode of art practice that transgresses traditional categories, combining sculptures, installations, and performances that involve music, film, computer animation, virtual worlds, plants, and organic processes. His aesthetics gives voice to complex contemporary human conditions and reflect on the questions that come to head as of late in contemporary life, such as the question of human autonomy in relation to both ecology and technology.

== Exhibitions ==
Individual Exhibitions

- Kaya Cynara, Empty Gallery, Hong Kong (2016)

=== 2017 ===
OF FUTURE NOWS 2017→ ∞, FESTIVAL OF FUTURE NOWS, Hamburger Bahnhof, Berlin, Germany

=== 2016 ===
- Master of Fine Arts Student Exhibition (Meisterschüler Ausstellung), Berlin University of the Arts, Berlin, Germany
- A Reservoir Of Trust. The Slohagenhallah Project, French-German Cultural Center Ramallah, Palestinia
- NOWs: Launch NAVEL in LA, Navel, Los Angeles, CA, United States

=== 2014 ===
- Hunter MFA Open Studios, Hunter College, New York, NY, United States
- Festival of Future Nows, Neue Nationalgalerie, Berlin, Germany
  Directed by Olafur Eliasson, and co-directed by Christina Werner, and Eric Ellingsen.
- Walk-in-Progress, Vitamin Space, Guangzhou, China
- Aeaeaeae, Hans-Henning Korb, Robert Lippok & Raul Walch: Molding Versions into Reality, Grey Sheep, Berlin, Germany

=== 2013 ===
- Accidental Accomplishment, Institut für Raumexperimente, Berlin, Germany
- Agora Collects , Agora, Berlin, Germany
- 100° Berlin 2013, Hebbel am Ufer, Berlin

=== 2012 ===
- Addis Foto Fest 2012, Alle School of Fine Art and Design, Addis Abeba University, and Modern Art Museum, Addis Ababa, Ethiopia
- Jan Meda – Großes Feld, Addis Ababa, Ethiopia
- Transnatural Festival 2012: The State of Autonomy, Nemo Science Center, Amsterdam, the Netherlands
- Translation Acts, The World Is Not Fair – Die Große Weltausstellung 2012, Institut für Raumexperimente at Tempelhofer Feld, Berlin, Germany (catalogue)
- Glasauge, Institut für Raumexperimente, Bunker, Berlin, Germany

=== Selected Screenings ===
YUWVUWVY, 2011. Video in collaboration with Aeaeaeae.

- Long Night of Transformation, Haus am Lützowplatz, Berlin, Germany (2012)
- Photo LA, Los Angeles, CA, United States (2012)
- Time is Light, 25 Positions. Photography, Video art and Sculpture, Hamburg, Germany (2011)
- Institut für Raumexperimente Videoscreening, Goethe Institute, São Paulo, Brazil (2011)
