= Otto Bonsema =

Dutch footballer (1909–1994)

Personal information
- Full name: Johan Otto Bonsema
- Date of birth: 3 November 1909
- Place of birth: Groningen, Netherlands
- Date of death: 27 March 1994 (aged 84)
- Place of death: Groningen, Netherlands
- Position: Forward

Senior career*
Years	Team	Apps	(Gls)
1928–1937	Velocitas 1897		
1937–1942	GVAV		

International career
1932–1939	Netherlands	6	(3)

Managerial career
- 1945: SC Heerenveen
- 1948–1962: GVAV
- 1962–1966: BV Veendam
- * Club domestic league appearances and goals

Otto Bonsema (3 November 1909 – 27 March 1994) was a Dutch football player and manager.

== Club career ==
Bonsema was born in Groningen. He played for the Velocitas 1897 senior team from the 1929–30 season and won the 1934 KNVB Cup with the club. He moved to city rival GVAV in 1937.

== International career ==
Bonsema made his debut for the Netherlands in a May 1932 friendly against Czechoslovakia and earned a total of six caps, scoring three goals. His final international was an April 1939 friendly against Belgium.

== Managerial career ==
Bonsema coached SC Heerenveen, GVAV and BV Veendam.
