= Karel Kolský =

Czech footballer and manager

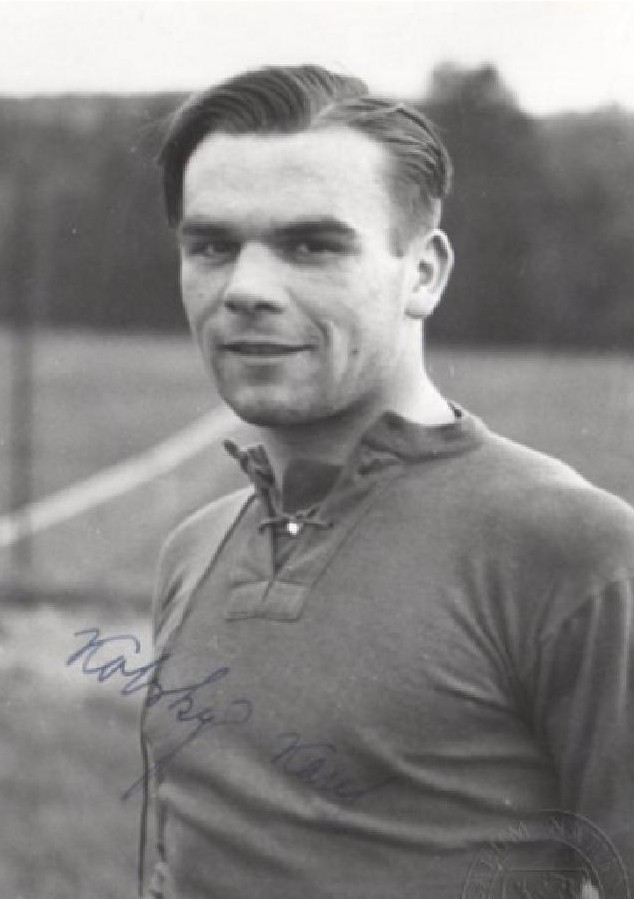

Personal information
- Date of birth: 21 September 1914
- Place of birth: Kročehlavy, Austria-Hungary
- Date of death: 2 February 1984 (aged 69)
- Position: Midfielder

Youth career
- SK Kročehlavy

Senior career*
Years	Team	Apps	(Gls)
1935–1937	SK Kladno		
1937–1948	Sparta Prague		
1948–1951	Sparta Úpice		

International career
1937–1948	Czechoslovakia	15	(0)

Managerial career
- 1951–1958: Dukla Prague
- 1956: Czechoslovakia
- 1958: Czechoslovakia
- 1959–1963: Sparta Prague
- 1963–1964: Wisła Kraków
- 1965–1967: Zbrojovka Brno
- 1967–1969: LIAZ Jablonec
- 1969–1970: Škoda Plzeň
- 1970–1971: Sparta Prague
- SONP Kladno
- 1976–1978: RH Cheb
- * Club domestic league appearances and goals

Karel Kolský (21 September 1914 in Kročehlavy – 17 February 1984) was a Czech football player and later a football manager. He played for Czechoslovakia, for which he played 13 matches.

He was a participant in the 1938 FIFA World Cup, and he coached Czechoslovakia at the 1958 FIFA World Cup.

After World War II, he worked as a football manager. He coached clubs such as Sparta Prague, SK Kladno, Dukla Prague, Viktoria Plzeň, Zbrojovka Brno and Polish Wisła Kraków.

He won twice the Czechoslovak First League with Dukla Prague, in 1956 and 1958.
