= Josef Košťálek =

Czech footballer

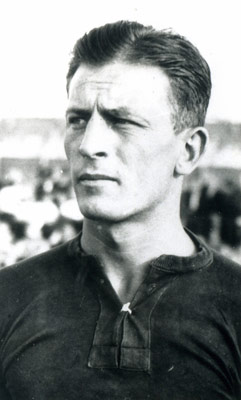
- Josef Košťálek at Mitropa Cup 1930

Personal information
- Date of birth: 31 August 1909
- Place of birth: Kročehlavy, Austria-Hungary
- Date of death: 21 November 1971 (aged 62)
- Place of death: Czechoslovakia
- Position: Midfielder

Youth career
- –1929: SK Kročehlavy

Senior career*
Years	Team	Apps	(Gls)
1929–1945	Sparta Prague		
1945–1946	Sparta Považská Bystrica		
1946–1951	SK Rakovník		

International career
1930–1939	Czechoslovakia	43	(2)

Managerial career
- 1957–1958: Baník Kladno
Medal record
Representing Czechoslovakia
Men's Football
FIFA World Cup
Runner-up	1934 Italy
- * Club domestic league appearances and goals

Josef Košťálek (31 August 1909 – 21 November 1971) was a Czech footballer.

== Career ==
He played for AC Sparta Prague and the Czechoslovakia national football team, for whom he played 43 matches, scoring two goals, and appeared in the 1934 and 1938 World Cups. In 1938, he scored in extra time against the Netherlands to put Czechoslovakia into the quarterfinals.
