= Pierre Korb =

French footballer (1908-1981)

Personal information
- Full name: Pierre Korb
- Date of birth: April 20, 1908
- Place of birth: France
- Date of death: February 22, 1981 (aged 72)
- Position: Forward

International career
Years	Team	Apps	(Gls)
- France

Pierre Korb (Mulhouse 20 April 1908 – 22 February 1981) was a French association footballer. He played for FC Mulhouse and FC Sochaux, earned 12 caps and scored 2 goals for the France national football team, and was included in the 1934 FIFA World Cup finals squad.
