= Josef Silný =

Czech footballer (1902–1981)

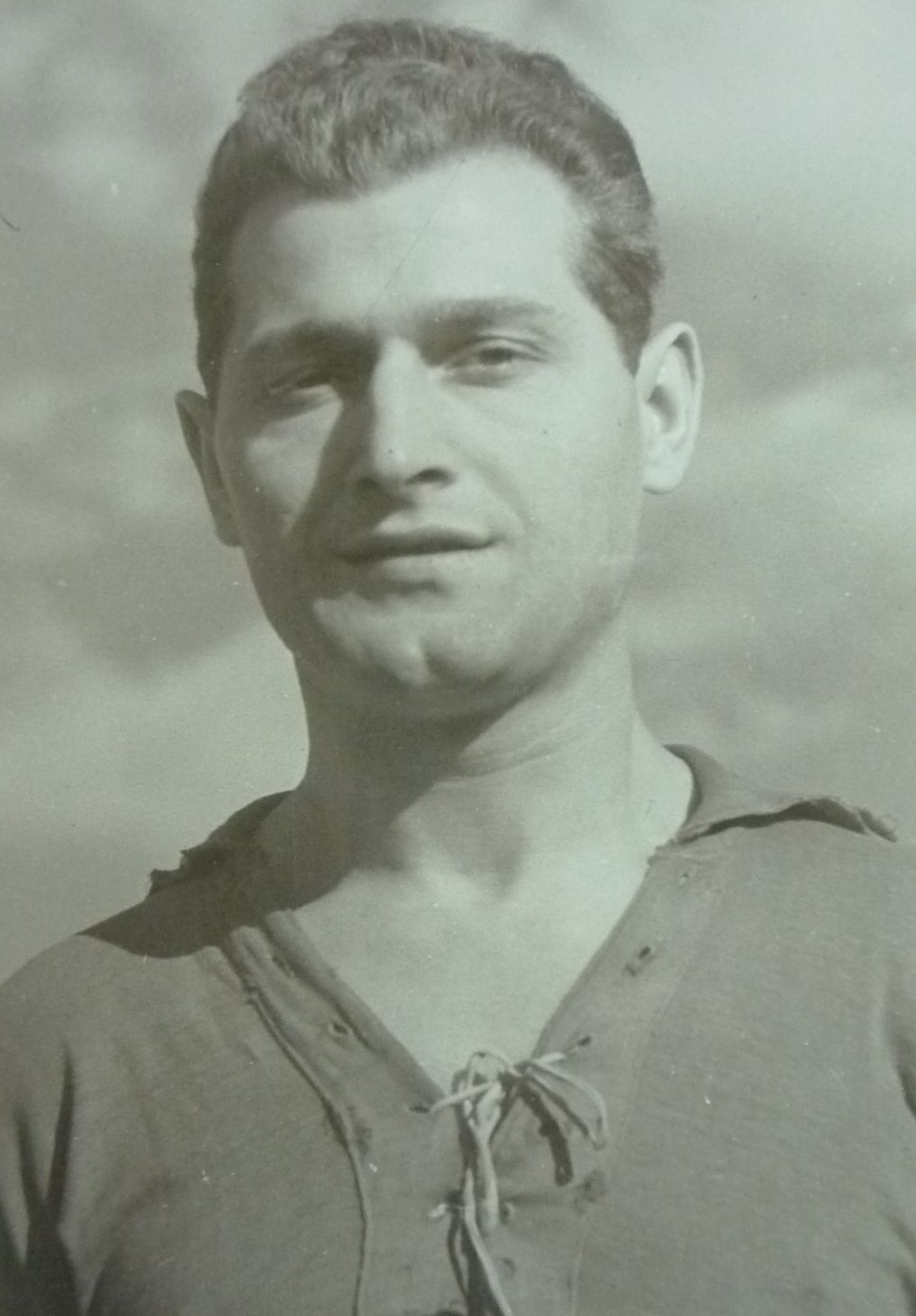
- Silný in 1932

Personal information
- Date of birth: 23 January 1902
- Place of birth: Kroměříž, Moravia, Austria-Hungary
- Date of death: 15 May 1981 (aged 79)
- Place of death: Czechoslovakia
- Position: Striker

Senior career*
Years	Team	Apps	(Gls)
- Hanácká Slavia Kroměříž
1923–1926	SK Slavia Praha		
1926–1933	AC Sparta Prague		
1933–1934	SC Nîmois		
1934–1935	Bohemians Praha		
1935–1940	Hanácká Slavia Kroměříž		

International career
1925–1934	Czechoslovakia	50	(28)

Managerial career
- 1935–1940: Hanácká Slavia Kroměříž
Medal record
Representing Czechoslovakia
Men's Football
FIFA World Cup
Runner-up	1934 Italy
- * Club domestic league appearances and goals

Josef Silný (23 January 1902 – 18 May 1981) was a Czech footballer who played as a forward.

Silný played for Hanácká Slavia Kroměříž, SK Slavia Praha (1923–1926), AC Sparta Prague (1926–1933), SC Nîmois (1933–1934) and Bohemians Praha (1934–1935).

He played for Czechoslovakia national team (50 matches and 28 goals), and was a participant at the 1934 FIFA World Cup, where he played in a match against Romania.

== National team ==
He earned 50 caps for the Czechoslovak national football team, scoring 28 goals. He was part of the team that finished as runners-up in the 1934 World Cup.

Scores and results list Czechoslovakia's goal tally first, score column indicates score after each Silný goal.

List of international goals scored by Josef Silný
No.	Date	Venue	Opponent	Score	Result	Competition	Ref.
1	28 October 1925	Stadion Letná, Prague, Czechoslovakia	Yugoslavia	5-0	7-0	Friendly	
2	6 June 1926	Üllői úti Stadion, Budapest, Hungary	Hungary	—	1-2	Friendly	
3	28 June 1926	Stadion Concordije, Zagreb, Yugoslavia	Yugoslavia	2-1	6-2	Friendly	
4	28 June 1926	Stadion Concordije, Zagreb, Yugoslavia	Yugoslavia	3-2	6-2	Friendly	
5	28 June 1926	Stadion Concordije, Zagreb, Yugoslavia	Yugoslavia	4-2	6-2	Friendly	
6	28 June 1926	Stadion Concordije, Zagreb, Yugoslavia	Yugoslavia	6-2	6-2	Friendly	
7	20 February 1927	San Siro, Milan, Italy	Italy	2-1	2-2	Friendly	
8	24 April 1927	Stadion Letná, Prague, Czechoslovakia	Hungary	4-1	4-1	Friendly	
9	26 May 1927	Stadion Letná, Prague, Czechoslovakia	Belgium	3-0	4-0	Friendly	
10	9 October 1927	Üllői úti Stadion, Budapest, Hungary	Hungary	2-0	2-1	Friendly	
11	1 April 1928	Hohe Warte Stadium, Vienna, Austria	Austria	1-0	1-0	1927–30 Central European International Cup	
12	28 October 1928	Stadion Letná, Prague, Czechoslovakia	Yugoslavia	3-1	7-1	Friendly	
13	28 October 1928	Stadion Letná, Prague, Czechoslovakia	Yugoslavia	6-1	7-1	Friendly	
14	3 March 1929	Stadio Littoriale, Bologna, Italy	Italy	1-0	2-4	1927–30 Central European International Cup	
15	17 March 1929	Stadion Letná, Prague, Czechoslovakia	Austria	1-2	3-3	Friendly	
16	5 May 1929	Stade Olympique de la Pontaise, Lausanne, Switzerland	Switzerland	2-0	4-1	1927–30 Central European International Cup	
17	5 May 1929	Stade Olympique de la Pontaise, Lausanne, Switzerland	Switzerland	4-1	4-1	1927–30 Central European International Cup	
18	28 June 1929	Stadion Concordije, Zagreb, Croatia	Yugoslavia	3-3	3-3	Friendly	
19	28 October 1929	Stadion Letná, Prague, Czechoslovakia	Yugoslavia	2-0	4-3	Friendly	
20	28 October 1929	Stadion Letná, Prague, Czechoslovakia	Yugoslavia	4-1	4-3	Friendly	
21	11 May 1930	Stade Yves-du-Manoir, Colombes, France	France	2-0	3-2	Friendly	
22	12 April 1931	Hohe Warte Stadium, Vienna, Austria	Austria	1-1	1-2	1931–32 Central European International Cup	
23	13 June 1931	Stadion Letná, Prague, Czechoslovakia	Switzerland	2-3	7-3	1931–32 Central European International Cup	
24	13 June 1931	Stadion Letná, Prague, Czechoslovakia	Switzerland	4-3	7-3	1931–32 Central European International Cup	
25	20 March 1932	Stadion Letná, Prague, Czechoslovakia	Hungary	1-0	1-3	Friendly	
26	29 May 1932	Olympic Stadium, Amsterdam, Netherlands	Netherlands	1-1	2-1	Friendly	
27	17 September 1933	Stadion Letná, Prague, Czechoslovakia	Austria	2-2	3-3	Friendly	
28	15 October 1933	Polish Army Stadium, Warsaw, Poland	Poland	1-0	2-1	1934 FIFA World Cup qualification	
