= Václav Horák =

Czech footballer and manager

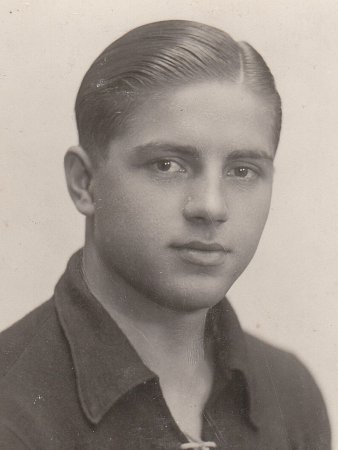
- Václav Horák

Personal information
- Date of birth: 27 September 1912
- Place of birth: Kročehlavy, Austria-Hungary
- Date of death: 15 November 2000 (aged 88)
- Position: Striker

Senior career*
Years	Team	Apps	(Gls)
1934–1936	Viktoria Plzeň		
1936–1939	Slavia Prague		

International career
1934–1938	Czechoslovakia	11	(5)

Managerial career
- 1942–1943: SK Slezská Ostrava
- 1948: Sokol Trojice Ostrava
- * Club domestic league appearances and goals

Václav Horák (27 September 1912 – 15 November 2000) was a Czech football player and later football manager.

He was a devoted player of SK Slavia Praha.

Horák played for the Czechoslovakia national team (11 matches/5 goals) and was a participant at the 1938 FIFA World Cup.
