= 1938–39 SK Rapid Wien season =

Rapid Wien
1938–39 season
- Coach: Leopold Nitsch
- Stadium: Pfarrwiese, Vienna, Austria
- Gauliga Ostmark: 3rd
- Tschammerpokal: Winner (1st title)
- Top goalscorer: League: Franz Binder (27); All: Franz Binder (31)
- Average home league attendance: 9,400

The 1938–39 SK Rapid Wien season was the 41st season in club history.

== Squad ==
=== Squad statistics ===
Nat.	Name	Gauliga		Cup		Total	
Nat.	Name	Apps	Goals	Apps	Goals	Apps	Goals
Goalkeepers
(Nazi Germany)	Anton Mayer	3		1		4	
(Nazi Germany)	Rudolf Raftl	15		3		18	
Defenders
(Nazi Germany)	Rudolf Schlauf	12		4		16	
(Nazi Germany)	Heribert Sperner	18		4		22	
(Nazi Germany)	Stefan Wagner	6				6	
Midfielders
(Nazi Germany)	Karl Czerny	1				1	
(Nazi Germany)	Johann Hofstätter	15	1	3	1	18	2
(Nazi Germany)	Walter Schörg	5		1		6	
(Nazi Germany)	Stefan Skoumal	16		4		20	
(Nazi Germany)	Franz Wagner	17		4		21	
Forwards
(Nazi Germany)	Franz Binder	17	27	4	4	21	31
(Nazi Germany)	Hermann Dvoracek	1	1			1	1
(Nazi Germany)	August Fellner	1				1	
(Nazi Germany)	Willy Fitz	1				1	
(Nazi Germany)	Rudolf Hawlicek	1				1	
(Nazi Germany)	Franz Hofer	17	8	4		21	8
(Nazi Germany)	Wilhelm Holec	11	5	4	2	15	7
(Nazi Germany)	Franz Kaspirek	10	3	3	1	13	4
(Nazi Germany)	Hans Pesser	10	1	1		11	1
(Nazi Germany)	Georg Schors	18	11	4	5	22	16
(Nazi Germany)	Engelbert Uridil	3	2			3	2

== Fixtures and results ==
Win Draw Loss

=== Gauliga ===
Rd	Date	Venue	Opponent	Res.	Att.	Goals and discipline
1	01.11.1938	H	Amateure Steyr	4-3	2,500	Holec, Binder (pen.)
2	11.09.1938	A	Admira	1-4	25,000	Binder 30'
3	04.12.1938	H	Wiener SC	7-2	12,000	Schors 10', Binder 12' 60' 73' 76', Holec 75', Hofer 87'
4	09.10.1938	A	Fiat Wien	2-2	10,000	Binder 21', Pesser 55'
5	16.10.1938	H	Austria Wien	5-1	8,000	Schors 3', Binder 9' 71', Hofer 39', Holec 75'
6	23.10.1938	A	Vienna	4-0	8,000	Binder 1' 75', Holec 43', Schors 56'
7	30.10.1938	H	Wacker Wr. Neustadt	2-0	3,000	Schors 28', Hofstätter 35'
8	13.11.1938	A	Wacker Wien	3-4	14,000	Holec 46', Binder 74' (pen.), Dvoracek 83'
9	20.11.1938	A	Grazer SC	6-2	5,000	Hofer 7', Binder 26' 71' 79', Kaspirek 46', Schors 77'
10	26.02.1939	A	Amateure Steyr	3-1	5,500	Schors 8', Binder 36', Kaspirek
11	19.02.1939	H	Admira	0-0	23,000	
12	22.01.1939	A	Wiener SC	1-2	13,000	Binder 73'
13	29.01.1939	H	Fiat Wien	3-2	5,000	Schors 15' 23', Hofer 28'
14	19.03.1939	A	Austria Wien	0-4	38,000	
15	12.02.1939	H	Vienna	3-1	12,000	Hofer 33', Scharl 64' (o.g.), Schors 74'
16	12.03.1939	A	Wacker Wr. Neustadt	13-1	2,500	Binder 10' 18' 26' (pen.) 44' 53' 62' 80', Hofer 21' 85', Schors 22' 68', Kaspirek 27', Uridil E. 89'
17	05.02.1939	H	Wacker Wien	0-0	16,000	
18	05.03.1939	H	Grazer SC	3-0	3,000	Uridil E. 25', Hofer 75', Binder 80'

=== Tschammerpokal ===
Rd	Date	Venue	Opponent	Res.	Att.	Goals and discipline
R16	06.11.1938	H	Fiat Wien	5-1	2,400	Kaspirek 5', Binder 10' 88', Schors 37', Holec 47'
QF	27.11.1938	A	Waldhof Mannheim	3-2	25,000	Binder 35', Schors 63', Holec 76'
SF	11.12.1938	H	FC Nürnberg	2-0	20,000	Schors 27' 76'
F	08.01.1939	N	FSV Frankfurt	3-1	40,000	Schors 80', Hofstätter 85', Binder 88'
