= 1940–41 SK Rapid Wien season =

Rapid Wien
1940–41 season
- Coach: Leopold Nitsch
- Stadium: Pfarrwiese, Vienna, Austria
- Gauliga Ostmark: Champions (14th title)
- German championship: Champions (1st title)
- Tschammerpokal: Semifinals
- Top goalscorer: League: Franz Binder (27); All: Franz Binder (44)
- Average home league attendance: 9,900

The 1940–41 SK Rapid Wien season was the 43rd season in club history.

== Squad ==
=== Squad statistics ===
Nat.	Name	Gauliga		German championship		Cup		Total	
Nat.	Name	Apps	Goals	Apps	Goals	Apps	Goals	Apps	Goals
Goalkeepers
(Nazi Germany)	Josef Musil	1						1	
(Nazi Germany)	Rudolf Raftl	17		8		5		30	
Defenders
(Nazi Germany)	Friedrich Pimperl	2						2	
(Nazi Germany)	Heribert Sperner	18		8		5		31	
(Nazi Germany)	Stefan Wagner	16		7		5		28	
Midfielders
(Nazi Germany)	Karl Czerny	1						1	
(Nazi Germany)	Leopold Gernhardt	2		5				7	
(Nazi Germany)	Johann Hofstätter	16	1	4		5		25	1
(Nazi Germany)	Stefan Skoumal	18		8		5		31	
(Nazi Germany)	Franz Wagner	17		8		5		30	
Forwards
(Nazi Germany)	Franz Binder	18	27	8	11	5	6	31	44
(Nazi Germany)	Hermann Dvoracek	6	1	5	3	5	3	16	7
(Nazi Germany)	Willy Fitz	18	7	8	1	5		31	8
(Nazi Germany)	Wilhelm Holec	5	5	4	1			9	6
(Nazi Germany)	Matthias Kaburek	12	18	2	2			14	20
(Nazi Germany)	Franz Kaspirek	1		4	4			5	4
(Nazi Germany)	Hans Pesser	15	10	2		5	4	22	14
(Nazi Germany)	Georg Schors	15	13	7	8	5	8	27	29

== Fixtures and results ==
Win Draw Loss

=== Gauliga ===
Rd	Date	Venue	Opponent	Res.	Att.	Goals and discipline
1	03.11.1940	H	Admira	6-1	18,000	Schors 4' 53' 76', Binder 5' 67', Pesser 32'
2	08.09.1940	A	FC Wien	1-3	5,000	Binder 48'
3	08.12.1940	H	Wiener SC	2-3	8,000	Pesser 47', Kaburek M. 66'
4	22.12.1940	A	LASK	9-0	2,500	Binder 4' 35' 47' 88', Dvoracek 15', Kaburek M. 40' 84', Pesser 42', Fitz 45'
5	13.10.1940	H	Wacker Wien	1-1	18,000	Pesser 65'
6	15.12.1940	H	Grazer SC	11-1	2,000	Pesser 7' 85', Binder 30', Schors 33' 40' 61' 63' 72', Kaburek M. 55' 88', Fitz 59'
7	27.10.1940	A	Austria Wien	3-0	20,000	Fitz 14', Pesser 20', Schors 68'
8	01.12.1940	H	Vienna	7-0	4,000	Kaburek M. 10' 59', Binder 25' (pen.), Pesser 32' 87', Schors 34' 53'
9	12.01.1941	A	FAC	7-0	8,000	Holec 24' 46' (pen.) 65' 66', Kaburek M. 69' 73', Binder 84'
10	02.03.1941	A	Admira	3-0	32,000	Fitz 14' 87', Binder 24' (pen.)
11	23.03.1941	H	FC Wien	5-5	6,000	Pesser 8', Binder 35', Kaburek M. 40' 74' 77'
12	23.02.1941	A	Wiener SC	2-2	13,500	Binder 51' 79'
13	02.02.1941	H	LASK	11-3	3,500	Binder 33' 52' 55' 61', Kaburek M. 41' 42' 44' 60' 79', Holec 76'
14	09.03.1941	A	Wacker Wien	3-2	16,000	Binder 18', Hofstätter 80', Fitz 86'
15	25.05.1941	A	Grazer SC	4-3	2,000	Binder 15' 68', Schors 46' 53'
16	30.03.1941	H	Austria Wien	1-0	20,000	Binder 28'
17	16.03.1941	A	Vienna	1-1	35,000	Fitz 70'
18	16.02.1941	H	FAC	5-4	10,000	Binder 5' 38' 45' 75', Kaburek M. 19'

=== German championship ===
Rd	Date	Venue	Opponent	Res.	Att.	Goals and discipline
G1	13.04.1941	A	Neckerau	7-0	12,000	Kaburek M. 19', Binder 40' 59' 75', Schors 48' 88', Holec 86'
G2	20.04.1941	H	Stuttgarter Kickers	1-1	31,000	Kaburek M. 58'
G3	27.04.1941	A	1860 Munich	1-2	30,000	Kaspirek 72'
G4	04.05.1941	A	Stuttgarter Kickers	5-1	20,000	Schors 6', Kaspirek 26', Fitz 50', Dvoracek 61', Binder 89'
G5	11.05.1941	H	Neckerau	8-1	15,000	Dvoracek 8', Binder 15' 77', Kaspirek 27', Schors 28' 30' 41' 62'
G6	18.05.1941	H	1860 Munich	2-0	35,000	Dvoracek 28', Kaspirek 75'
SF	08.06.1941	N	Dresdner SC	2-1	30,000	Binder 9' 55'
F	22.06.1941	N	Schalke	4-3	95,000	Schors 62', Binder 63' 65' (pen.) 71'

=== Tschammerpokal ===
Rd	Date	Venue	Opponent	Res.	Att.	Goals and discipline
R1	01.09.1940	A	Neumeyer Nürnberg	2-1 (a.e.t.)	9,000	Schors 69', Dvoracek 92'
R2	15.09.1940	H	VfR Schweinfurt	7-1	8,000	Dvoracek 10', Pesser 32' 65', Binder 37', Schors 47' 49' 54'
R3	29.09.1940	A	Stuttgarter Kickers	5-1	22,000	Pesser 17', Schors 19' 39' 65', Dvoracek 82'
QF	20.10.1940	H	Fürth	6-1	18,000	Binder 18' 39' (pen.) 55' 89', Pesser 53', Schors 82'
SF	10.11.1940	A	Dresdner SC	1-3	42,000	Binder 88' (pen.)
