= List of SK Rapid Wien players =

SK Rapid Wien is an Austria professional football team formed in 1899. Throughout its history the club's first team has competed in various national and international competitions. All players who have played in 50 or more such matches are listed below.

== Key ==
- Players with name in **bold** currently play for the club.
- Years are the first and last calendar years in which the player appeared in competitive first-team football for the club.
- League appearances and goals comprise those in the Austrian Football Bundesliga and its predecessors of top-level league football in Austria, including the Gauliga from 1938 to 1945 during Austrias annexation by Nazi Germany.
- Total appearances and goals comprise those in the League, Austrian Cup (replaced by the Tschammerpokal from 1938-45), Austrian Supercup and international appearances in UEFA competitions and the Mitropa Cup.

== Players with 50 or more appearances ==
Appearances and goals are for first-team competitive matches only. Substitute appearances are included. Statistics are correct as of 21 November 2026.

Position key: GK – Goalkeeper; DF – Defender; MF – Midfielder; FW – Forward

Name	Nationality	Position	SK Rapid Wien career	League Appearances	League Goals	Total Appearances	Total Goals
Marcin Adamski	Poland	DF	2001–2004; 2005–2006	106	4	126	4
**Ange Ahoussou**	Ivory Coast	DF	2025–	38		50	
Deni Alar	Austria	FW	2011–2016; 2018–2019; 2020–2021	140	40	175	50
Romeo Amane	Ivory Coast	MF	2025–2026	47	2	69	2
Adolf Antrich	Austria	GK	1971–1975	61		82	
Kelvin Arase	Austria	FW	2016–2022	76	10	105	13
**Jonas Auer**	Austria	DF	2021–	110	4	167	4
Stephan Auer	Austria	DF	2015–2020	103	2	132	3
Lukas Aurednik	Austria	FW	1935–1938; 1942–1943; 1944–1946	59	33	67	41
Mateo Barać	Croatia	DF	2018–2021	57	3	80	4
Zoran Barisic	Austria	MF	1993–1997	83	11	99	15
Peter Barthold	Austria	GK	1973–1980	72		86	
Edi Bauer	Austria	FW	1911–1926	188	133	197	137
Mario Bazina	Croatia	MF	2005–2008	72	18	83	21
Brian Behrendt	Germany	DF	2013–2015	40	1	54	2
Radek Bejbl	Czech Republic	MF	2005–2007	59	3	69	3
Veton Berisha	Norway	FW	2017–2019	44	7	58	9
Josef Bertalan	Austria	FW	1952–1963	145	37	182	45
Josef Bican	Austria	FW	1931–1935	49	52	61	66
Lothar Bilek	Austria	MF	1954–1961	49		67	
Mate Bilić	Croatia	FW	2006–2008	54	16	63	18
Franz Binder	Austria	FW	1930–1949	261	296	321	399
Johnny Bjerregaard	Denmark	FW	1966–1972	151	96	199	127
Gustav Blaha	Austria	FW	1911–1918	60	34	60	34
Franz Blizenec	Austria	MF	1987–1994	117	3	143	4
Boli Bolingoli	Belgium	DF	2017–2019	56	3	73	3
**Bendegúz Bolla**	Hungary	DF	2024–	74	7	108	10
Branko Bošković	Montenegro	MF	2006–2010; 2013–2014	133	23	163	29
Terrence Boyd	United States	FW	2012–2014	59	28	80	37
Josef Brandstätter	Austria	DF	1911–1926	234	23	249	25
Martin Braun	Germany	MF	1997–2000	63	1	78	2
Karl Brauneder	Austria	DF	1983–1991; 1992–1994	262	21	331	25
Petar Bručić	Yugoslavia	MF	1982–1987	118	6	165	7
Josef Bugala	Austria	GK	1929–1933	58		77	
Guido Burgstaller	Austria	FW	2011–2014; 2022–2025	158	58	214	73
Hans Buzek	Austria	FW	1970–1972	49	12	58	20
**Nenad Cvetković**	Serbia	DF	2024–	70	7	109	10
Leopold Czejka	Austria	DF	1924–1937	124		160	
**Petter Nosa Dahl**	Norway	FW	2025–	36	10	53	14
**Yusuf Demir**	Austria	MF	2019–2021; 2022; 2026–	64	15	85	20
Christopher Dibon	Austria	DF	2013–2023	134	7	177	9
Robert Dienst	Austria	FW	1948–1962	284	306	324	321
Vinzenz Dittrich	Austria	DF	1912–1925	151	19	161	19
Andreas Dober	Austria	DF	2003–2011; 2017	136	7	179	8
Ernst Dokupil	Austria	FW	1974–1976	54	9	66	9
Jens Dowe	Germany	MF	1999–2001	60	7	73	9
Christopher Drazan	Austria	MF	2008–2013	112	6	144	11
Hermann Dvoracek	Austria	FW	1936–1945	71	54	84	63
Hannes Eder	Austria	DF	2006–2011	68	4	83	5
Erich Fak	Austria	DF	1964–1973	177	2	230	2
Walter Feigl	Austria	GK	1924–1929	45		59	
Ferdinand Feldhofer	Austria	DF	2001–2005	80	5	91	6
Herbert Feurer	Austria	GK	1976–1989	289		360	
Willy Fitz	Austria	FW	1938–1947	110	31	131	33
Jan Åge Fjørtoft	Norway	FW	1989–1993	129	63	156	85
Rudi Flögel	Austria	FW	1958–1972	333	145	432	194
Taxiarchis Fountas	Greece	FW	2019–2022	69	35	92	45
Oliver Freund	Germany	MF	1997–2002	126	6	155	8
Toni Fritsch	Austria	FW	1963–1971	123	15	161	18
Gerald Fuchsbichler	Austria	GK	1967–1971	95		124	
Herbert Gager	Austria	MF	1988–1989; 1991–1992	49	4	52	5
Geza Gallos	Austria	FW	1969–1973; 1977–1979	170	47	212	61
Kurt Garger	Austria	DF	1979–1988; 1994–1995	255	5	331	7
György Garics	Austria	DF	2002–2007	81	1	94	2
**Paul Gartler**	Austria	GK	2020–	38		60	
René Gartler	Austria	FW	2003–2005; 2008–2012	59	10	74	17
Herbert Gartner	Austria	GK	1954–1958	53		71	
Walter Gebhardt	Austria	DF	1965–1971	135	1	176	1
Leopold Gernhardt	Austria	MF	1939–1955	206	47	228	54
Karl Giesser	Austria	MF	1949–1964	242	17	289	20
Walter Glechner	Austria	DF	1958–1971	257	9	334	13
Franz Golobic	Austria	MF	1946–1959	249	9	276	10
Srđan Grahovac	Bosnia and Herzegovina	MF	2014–2017; 2019–2022	138	6	194	8
Leopold Grausam	Austria	FW	1963–1970	142	58	181	70
Leo Greiml	Austria	DF	2019–2022	42		57	1
Lukas Grgić	Austria	MF	2023–2026	64	2	95	3
Herbert Gronen	West Germany	FW	1972–1976	77	12	98	14
Johann Gröss	Austria	FW	1978–1983; 1984–1985	94	12	109	18
Lukas Grozurek	Austria	MF	2011–2014	64	3	81	5
Marco Grüll	Austria	FW	2021–2024	92	28	132	46
Leopold Grundwald	Austria	FW	1911–1922	112	51	118	53
Peter Guggi	Austria	MF	1994–1997	71	5	91	9
Josef Hagler	Austria	DF	1911–1918	76	7	76	7
Sulejman Halilović	Yugoslavia	FW	1985–1988	80	24	105	40
Paul Halla	Austria	DF/FW	1953–1965	289	39	360	44
Gerhard Hanappi	Austria	MF/FW	1950–1965	333	114	394	124
Ernst Happel	Austria	DF	1942–1955; 1956–1959	240	25	264	32
Günther Happich	Austria	MF	1978–1980	51	7	59	7
Franz Hasil	Austria	MF/FW	1962–1968	103	18	133	23
Michael Hatz	Austria	DF	1991–1996; 1997–2001	225	10	269	12
**Niklas Hedl**	Austria	GK	2022–	146		207	
Raimund Hedl	Austria	GK	1996–2001; 2005–2011	83		114	
Markus Heikkinen	Finland	MF	2007–2013	173	4	217	5
Andreas Heraf	Austria	MF	1985–1988; 1994–2000	190	27	240	32
Andreas Herzog	Austria	MF	1986–1992; 2001–2003	174	37	201	41
Josef Hickersberger	Austria	MF	1980–1982	48	4	54	5
Markus Hiden	Austria	DF	2002–2006	101	3	117	3
Martin Hiden	Austria	DF	1997–1998; 2003–2009	141	4	170	5
Peter Hlinka	Slovakia	MF	2004–2007	93	11	112	12
Norbert Hof	Austria	DF/MF	1971–1976	147	6	191	10
Franz Hofer	Austria	FW	1937–1946	44	15	57	18
Erwin Hoffer	Austria	FW	2006–2010	85	41	95	44
Johann Hoffmann	Austria	FW	1925–1932	72	23	94	38
Helmut Hofmann	Austria	FW	1979–1983	75	10	85	11
Maximilian Hofmann	Austria	DF	2013–2024	193	3	273	11
Steffen Hofmann	Germany	MF	2002–2005; 2006–2018	434	98	540	128
Johann Hofstätter	Austria	DF	1937–1945	106	5	125	6
Wilhelm Holec	Austria	FW	1936–1942	50	26	56	29
Josef Höltl	Austria	DF	1955–1967	252	1	324	1
Johann Horvath	Austria	FW	1927–1930	44	24	71	37
Peter Hrstic	Austria	MF	1984–1988	84	27	111	33
Ludwig Huyer	Austria	GK	1960–1963	47		65	
Trifon Ivanov	Bulgaria	DF	1995–1997	53	7	72	10
Andreas Ivanschitz	Austria	MF	1999–2006	147	25	177	27
Alois Jagodic	Austria	MF	1969–1972	80	8	101	9
Ante Jazić	Canada	MF	2000–2004	107	1	123	2
Nikica Jelavić	Croatia	FW	2008–2011	71	27	95	43
Matej Jelić	Croatia	FW	2015–2017	37	6	54	9
Karl Jestrab	Austria	DF	1932–1937	108		134	
Joelinton	Brazil	FW	2016–2018	60	15	79	21
Patrick Jovanovic	Austria	DF	1990–1998	121	1	145	1
Matthias Kaburek	Austria	FW	1928–1936; 1939–1945	165	142	216	206
Robert Kaffka	Austria	DF	1951–1956	71		74	
Florian Kainz	Austria	MF	2014–2016	65	11	84	15
Günter Kaltenbrunner	Austria	FW	1967–1969	47	27	62	36
**Ercan Kara**	Austria	FW	2020–2021; 2025–	118	43	169	59
Franz Kaspirek	Austria	FW	1936–1950	118	28	139	36
Markus Katzer	Austria	DF	2004–2013	216	18	273	22
Christian Kautzky	Austria	DF	1975–1978	53		58	
Veli Kavlak	Austria	MF	2004–2011	146	13	181	16
Christian Keglevits	Austria	FW	1979–1984; 1989–1991	197	55	247	74
Roman Kerschbaum	Austria	MF	2022–2025	58	2	79	5
Reinhard Kienast	Austria	DF	1978–1992	393	61	495	79
Roman Kienast	Austria	FW	2002–2006	55	3	60	6
Marek Kincl	Czech Republic	FW	2004–2007	93	27	111	30
Willibald Kirbes	Austria	FW	1922–1932	131	39	181	55
Helmut Kirisits	Austria	MF	1976–1979	91	19	104	21
Koya Kitagawa	Japan	FW	2019–2022	50	5	72	7
Karl Klär	Austria	DF	1920–1924	73	1	79	1
Christoph Knasmüllner	Austria	MF	2018–2023	127	24	175	38
Iván Knez	Switzerland; Argentina	DF	2001–2003	50	1	53	1
Lukas Königshofer	Austria	GK	2010–2014	46		56	
Michael Konsel	Austria	GK	1984–1997	395		486	
Ümit Korkmaz	Austria	MF	2006–2008	55	3	62	3
Alfred Körner	Austria	FW	1942–1959	283	158	323	181
Heinz Körner	Austria	FW	1911–1921	96	39	98	43
Robert Körner	Austria	FW	1942–1958	212	80	242	93
György Korsós	Hungary	MF	2004–2006	53	2	71	2
Zlatko Kranjčar	Yugoslavia; Croatia	FW	1983–1991	201	106	269	132
Hans Krankl	Austria	FW	1970–1971; 1972–1978; 1980–1986	350	266	449	335
August Kraupar	Austria	GK	1918–1921	49		55	
Emil Krause	West Germany	MF	1973–1978	154	4	183	4
Bernd Krauss	West Germany; Austria	DF	1977–1983	191	18	224	20
Johann Krejcirik	Austria	FW	1976–1980	125	31	139	36
Dietmar Kühbauer	Austria	MF	1992–1997	148	33	177	39
Nicolas-Gerrit Kühn	Germany	MF	2022–2023	36	5	51	7
Stefan Kulovits	Austria	MF	2002–2013	202	4	252	4
Richard Kuthan	Austria	FW	1911–1926; 1927–1930	244	164	269	181
Giorgi Kvilitaia	Georgia	FW	2016–2018	55	17	67	22
Andreas Lagonikakis	Greece	MF	1999–2002	80	8	100	12
Leo Lainer	Austria	DF	1982–1988	168	23	230	33
Axel Lawarée	Belgium	FW	2004–2006	71	18	87	25
Dejan Ljubicic	Austria	MF	2017–2021	103	6	131	8
Bernd Lorenz	Austria	FW	1971–1974	77	27	106	45
Johann Luef	Austria	FW	1926–1937	149	48	201	69
Josef Madlmayer	Austria	MF	1925–1930	90		124	
Ladislav Maier	Czech Republic	GK	1998–2005	151		185	
Stefan Maierhofer	Austria	FW	2008–2009	49	31	60	38
Sergei Mandreko	Tajikistan; Russia	MF	1992–1997	107	16	129	19
Stephan Marasek	Austria	MF	1993–1996	99	5	118	8
Sebastián Martínez	Austria	MF	2003–2006	100	13	124	14
Max Merkel	Austria	DF	1937; 1946–1954	146	7	153	9
Sascha Metlitski	Belarus	MF	1991–1993	58	10	65	13
Branko Milanović	Yugoslavia	FW	1960–1966	47	8	67	11
Martin Moormann	Austria	DF	2021–2024	50	1	67	1
Erich Müller	Austria	MF	1946–1953	72	2	76	2
Thomas Murg	Austria	MF	2016–2020	122	26	163	35
Josef Musil	Austria	GK	1937–1938; 1940–1952	89		98	
Leopold Nitsch	Austria	MF	1915–1928	198		230	
Jan Novota	Slovakia	GK	2011–2017	95		134	
Atdhe Nuhiu	Austria	FW	2010–2012	59	13	71	17
Johann Ostermann	Austria	FW	1932–1936	79	26	99	31
Moritz Oswald	Austria	MF	2021–2025; 2026	70	1	99	1
Peter Pacult	Austria	FW	1984–1986	58	26	80	39
Egon Pajenk	Austria	DF	1970–1979	266	17	322	20
Antonín Panenka	Czechoslovakia	MF	1981–1985	127	63	172	77
Jürgen Patocka	Austria	DF	2007–2012	111	7	146	7
Mario Pavelic	Austria	DF	2013–2018	104	4	134	6
Paul Pawlek	Austria	FW	1974–1979	87	22	100	24
Helge Payer	Austria	GK	2001–2012	254		298	
Robert Pecl	Austria	DF	1986–1995	189	15	228	16
Yasin Pehlivan	Austria	MF	2009–2011	62	3	86	3
Marek Penksa	Slovakia	FW	1996–2000	110	18	142	22
Vukan Perović	Yugoslavia	FW	1979–1980; 1982–1983	52	22	58	23
Peter Persidis	Austria	DF	1975–1982	182	3	209	4
Hans Pesser	Austria	FW	1930–1942	157	48	203	63
Dejan Petrovič	Slovenia	MF	2020–2023	63		82	
Thanos Petsos	Greece	MF	2013–2016; 2017–2018	92	5	122	7
Heimo Pfeifenberger	Austria	FW	1988–1992	117	42	142	56
Harald Pichler	Austria	DF	2011–2014	61	2	72	2
Roman Pichler	Austria	GK	1964–1968	53		70	
Roman Pivarník	Slovakia	MF	1994–1997	59	5	70	5
Andreas Poiger	Austria	DF	1989–1993	79	2	101	3
Johann Pregesbauer	Austria	DF	1974–1986	284	13	348	16
Mario Prišć	Croatia	MF	2001–2004	87	2	95	2
Erich Probst	Austria	FW	1950–1956	112	107	118	112
Christian Prosenik	Austria	MF	1996–1999	86	9	113	11
Philipp Prosenik	Austria	FW	2014–2016; 2017	44	8	60	10
Marcus Pürk	Austria	FW	1994–1995; 1997–1999	104	27	126	34
Gustav Putzendopler	Austria	MF	1913–1920	50		56	
Martin Puza	Austria	DF	1988–1990; 1991–1993	47		51	
Leopold Querfeld	Austria	DF	2021–2024	56	4	71	4
Zeljko Radovic	Austria	FW	2000–2001	42	11	51	13
Rudolf Raftl	Austria	GK	1930–1944	187		239	
Krzysztof Ratajczyk	Poland	DF	1996–2001	142	8	178	11
**Serge-Philippe Raux-Yao**	France	DF	2024–	75	2	110	5
Peter Rehnelt	Austria	MF	1962–1967	54	11	67	15
Andreas Reisinger	Austria	MF	1989–1991	58	6	76	7
Peter Reiter	Austria	FW	1958–1962	64	49	71	56
Franz Resch	Austria	DF	1989–1993	64		77	1
Johann Richter	Austria	MF	1922–1928	113	13	133	16
Johann Riegler	Austria	FW	1948–1958	218	130	241	139
Karl Ritter	Austria	FW	1972–1975	62	14	81	20
Gerhard Rodax	Austria	FW	1991–1993	43	12	50	12
Rudolf Rupec	Austria; Yugoslavia	MF	1913–1920	67	1	69	1
Marcel Sabitzer	Austria	FW	2012–2014	45	10	57	12
Jürgen Saler	Austria	MF	1998–2003	94	4	113	5
Hamdi Salihi	Albania	FW	2009–2012	67	36	90	53
Peter Sallmayer	Austria	MF	1979–1981	62	4	69	5
Mamadou Sangaré	Mali	MF	2024–2025	30	2	50	3
Dejan Savićević	Serbia and Montenegro	MF	1999–2001	44	18	54	20
**Louis Schaub**	Austria	MF	2012–2018; 2024–	209	29	284	54
Franz Schediwy	Austria	DF	1911–1922	52		61	
Günther Scheffl	Austria	DF	1971–1975	85		112	
Thorsten Schick	Austria	MF	2019–2024	115	3	158	3
Günter Schießwald	Austria	DF	1999–2003	83	6	100	7
Michael Schimpelsberger	Austria	DF	2010–2016	53		64	
Rainer Schlagbauer	Austria	MF	1974–1977	82	6	98	8
Max Schmid	West Germany	FW	1961–1966	91	42	115	51
Philipp Schobesberger	Austria	MF	2014–2022	130	23	164	31
Georg Schors	Austria	FW	1937–1946	89	55	110	74
Peter Schöttel	Austria	DF	1986–2001	436	4	527	6
Thomas Schrammel	Austria	DF	2011–2017	128	1	172	3
Roman Schramseis	Austria	DF	1926–1932	115		162	1
Stefan Schwab	Austria	MF	2014–2020	186	41	241	51
**Matthias Seidl**	Austria	MF	2023–	109	14	160	24
Walter Seitl	Austria	FW	1960–1968	137	67	176	82
Walter Skocik	Austria	MF	1959–1969	190	33	252	42
Stefan Skoumal	Austria	MF	1930–1943	205	1	250	1
Maciej Śliwowski	Poland	FW	1993–1996	71	21	79	23
Franz Smistik	Austria	FW	1928–1937	41	10	56	10
Josef Smistik	Austria	MF	1926–1937	203	20	282	26
Engelbert Smutny	Austria	DF	1941–1947	63	3	75	3
Thomas Sobotzik	Germany	MF	2001–2003	49	8	51	8
Franz Solil	Austria	DF	1924–1927	59	9	65	9
Ragnvald Soma	Norway	DF	2009–2012	79	2	101	2
Mario Sonnleitner	Austria	DF	2010–2021	267	22	357	27
Heribert Sperner	Austria	DF	1935–1943	93		115	
Hermann Stadler	Austria	FW	1983–1987	48	2	67	3
Stefan Stangl	Austria	DF	2014–2016	41	5	54	5
August Starek	Austria	MF	1965–1967; 1970–1971; 1973–1977	130	49	162	61
Horst Steiger	Austria	MF	1989–1994	87	7	105	8
Willibald Stejskal	Austria	DF	1915–1923	60	1	64	1
Peter Stöger	Austria	MF	1995–1997	84	17	113	22
Zoran Stojadinović	Yugoslavia	FW	1987–1988	41	29	52	37
Filip Stojković	Montenegro	DF	2019–2022	73	2	97	2
Richard Strebinger	Austria	GK	2015–2022	158		205	
Leopold Ströll	Austria	FW	1947–1950	47	39	52	43
Christian Stumpf	Austria	FW	1995–1998	78	28	107	40
Florian Sturm	Austria	MF	2002–2005	49	2	60	2
Gerhard Sturmberger	Austria	DF	1973–1976	64		81	
Gaston Taument	Netherlands	FW	2000–2002	61	4	77	5
Ludwig Tauschek	Austria	DF	1931–1937	59	1	75	1
Christian Thonhofer	Austria	DF	2006–2010	78		89	
Mario Tokić	Croatia	DF	2007–2009	43	1	52	1
Christopher Trimmel	Austria	MF	2009–2014	149	18	199	24
Ewald Ullmann	Austria	MF	1963–1973	178	10	234	12
Maximilian Ullmann	Austria	DF	2019–2021	77	4	103	6
Josef Uridil	Austria	FW	1917–1925; 1926–1927	105	127	116	147
Jozef Valachovič	Slovakia	DF	2005–2007	71	7	85	9
Andrija Vereš	Yugoslavia	GK	1964–1966	54		70	
Franz Wagner	Austria	MF	1931–1949	251	1	304	1
René Wagner	Czech Republic	FW	1996–2004	220	75	261	90
Stefan Wagner	Austria	DF	1936–1950	138		163	
Roman Wallner	Austria	FW	1999–2004	134	42	155	49
Werner Walzer	Austria	MF	1969–1979	267	16	326	18
Franz Weber	Austria	MF	1985–1994	187	16	226	20
Heribert Weber	Austria	DF	1978–1989	315	39	410	49
Rudolf Weinhofer	Austria	MF	1980–1988	159	11	208	14
Heinz Weiss	Austria	MF	1977–1982	53	2	63	2
Franz Weselik	Austria	FW	1923–1934	175	160	228	217
Ferdinand Wesely	Austria	FW	1920–1931	206	121	261	165
Arnold Wetl	Austria	MF	1997–2001	96	9	118	13
Kurt Widmann	Austria	FW	1975–1977	68	9	80	11
Gustav Wieser	Austria	FW	1915–1921	82	62	91	67
Gerald Willfurth	Austria	MF	1982–1989	204	41	272	61
Gerd Wimmer	Austria	MF	1997–2000	83	6	102	7
Kevin Wimmer	Austria	DF	2021–2023	30	1	50	2
Franz Wolny	Austria	FW	1961–1965	50	20	71	28
Karl Wondrak	Austria	FW	1914–1928	221	68	240	77
**Nikolaus Wurmbrand**	Austria	FW	2024–	62	6	94	14
Dominik Wydra	Austria	MF	2011–2015	57	2	67	3
Wilhelm Zaglitsch	Austria	DF	1956–1966	66		96	
Walter Zeman	Austria	GK	1945–1961	235		259	
Anatoliy Zinchenko	Soviet Union	MF	1981–1983	45	6	55	6
Thomas Zingler	Austria	DF	1996–2002	112	9	153	13
