= 1937–38 SK Rapid Wien season =

Rapid Wien
1937–38 season
- Coach: Leopold Nitsch
- Stadium: Pfarrwiese, Vienna, Austria
- Nationalliga: Champions (12th title)
- Austrian Cup: Round of 16
- Top goalscorer: League: Franz Binder (22); All: Franz Binder (22)
- Average home league attendance: 9,800

The 1937–38 SK Rapid Wien season was the 40th season in club history.

== Squad ==
=== Squad statistics ===
Nat.	Name	League		Cup		Total	
Nat.	Name	Apps	Goals	Apps	Goals	Apps	Goals
Goalkeepers
(Austria)	Anton Mayer	1				1	
(Austria)	Josef Musil	3				3	
(Austria)	Rudolf Raftl	14		1		15	
Defenders
(Austria)	Rudolf Schlauf	12				12	
(Austria)	Heribert Sperner	7		1		8	
(Austria)	Stefan Wagner	18		1		19	
Midfielders
(Austria)	Johann Hofstätter	18		1		19	
(Austria)	Stefan Skoumal	18		1		19	
(Austria)	Franz Wagner	13		1		14	
Forwards
(Austria)	Josef Adelbrecht	5	3			5	3
(Austria)	Lukas Aurednik	16	3	1		17	3
(Austria)	Franz Binder	17	22	1		18	22
(Austria)	August Fellner			1		1	
(Austria)	Franz Hofer	1	1			1	1
(Austria)	Wilhelm Holec	18	8			18	8
(Austria)	Johann Meister	2				2	
(Austria)	Hans Pesser	15	7	1		16	7
(Austria)	Walter Probst	11	6			11	6
(Austria)	Georg Schors	9	8			9	8
(Austria)	Josef Wanzenböck			1		1	

== Fixtures and results ==
Win Draw Loss

=== League ===
Rd	Date	Venue	Opponent	Res.	Att.	Goals and discipline
1	29.08.1937	H	FC Wien	5-0	8,000	Holec 19', Binder 23' 29' 32', Adelbrecht 73'
2	05.09.1937	A	Wiener SC	1-2	24,000	Binder 83'
3	22.09.1937	H	Vienna	2-0	7,000	Adelbrecht 2', Pesser 56'
4	26.09.1937	A	FavAC	3-0	12,000	Binder 62' 80', Adelbrecht 72'
5	03.10.1937	H	Admira	5-3	16,000	Binder 10' 26', Pesser 24' 60', Aurednik 43'
6	17.10.1937	H	Wacker Wien	3-3	8,000	Holec 30', Binder 34' 39'
7	31.10.1937	A	FAC	2-1	9,000	Binder 4' 64'
8	07.11.1937	A	Austria Wien	2-1	20,000	Binder 15', Probst W. 44'
9	14.11.1937	H	Simmering	5-1	8,000	Probst W. 11' 54', Binder 14', Pesser 34' 69'
10	13.02.1938	A	Wacker Wien	2-0	15,000	Binder 47' (pen.), Pesser 75'
11	20.02.1938	H	FAC	3-0	8,000	Binder 8' 30', Aurednik 43'
12	06.03.1938	H	Austria Wien	3-0	21,000	Pesser 3', Binder 20', Schors 86'
13	20.03.1938	A	Simmering	9-1	3,000	Schors 3' 35' 40' 75', Binder 22' 45', Holec 24' 57' 76'
14	12.04.1938	A	FC Wien	2-0	6,000	Hrdlicka 47' (o.g.), Binder 71'
15	03.07.1938	H	Wiener SC	3-1	5,000	Schors 58', Hofer 80', Holec 83'
16	29.06.1938	A	Vienna	2-2	2,000	Schors 48', Binder 62'
17	16.06.1938	H	FavAC	6-2	7,000	Probst W. 8' 28', Aurednik 57', Schors 58', Holec 89'
18	26.03.1938	A	Admira	1-2	4,500	Holec 59'

=== Cup ===
Rd	Date	Venue	Opponent	Res.	Att.	Goals and discipline
R1	06.02.1938	A	Admira	0-1	13,000	
