= 1939–40 SK Rapid Wien season =

Rapid Wien
1939–40 season
- Coach: Leopold Nitsch
- Stadium: Pfarrwiese, Vienna, Austria
- Gauliga Ostmark: Champions (13th title)
- German championship: 3rd
- Tschammerpokal: Semifinals
- Top goalscorer: League: Franz Binder (18); All: Franz Binder (50)
- Average home league attendance: 10,000

The 1939–40 SK Rapid Wien season was the 42nd season in club history.

== Squad ==
=== Squad statistics ===
Nat.	Name	Gauliga		German championship		Cup		Total	
Nat.	Name	Apps	Goals	Apps	Goals	Apps	Goals	Apps	Goals
Goalkeepers
(Nazi Germany)	Anton Mayer	3						3	
(Nazi Germany)	Rudolf Raftl	11		9		7		27	
Defenders
(Nazi Germany)	Walter Schörg	7		1		3		11	
(Nazi Germany)	Heribert Sperner	9		9		5		23	
(Nazi Germany)	Stefan Wagner	13		9		6		28	
Midfielders
(Nazi Germany)	Stefan Domnanich			2				2	
(Nazi Germany)	Leopold Gernhardt	3				1		4	
(Nazi Germany)	Johann Hofstätter	12	2	1		7		20	2
(Nazi Germany)	Stefan Skoumal	14		9		7		30	
(Nazi Germany)	Franz Wagner	11		6		6		23	
Forwards
(Nazi Germany)	Franz Binder	13	18	9	14	7	18	29	50
(Nazi Germany)	Hermann Dvoracek	2	1	9	10	1		12	11
(Nazi Germany)	August Fellner	11	8			3	1	14	9
(Nazi Germany)	Willy Fitz	3	1	9	2			12	3
(Nazi Germany)	Franz Hofer	11	2			6	2	17	4
(Nazi Germany)	Wilhelm Holec					1	1	1	1
(Nazi Germany)	Matthias Kaburek	13	7	8	3	4	3	25	13
(Nazi Germany)	Franz Kaspirek	3		6				9	
(Nazi Germany)	Hans Pesser	10	7	9	4	7	4	26	15
(Nazi Germany)	Georg Schors	4	2	3	2	5	5	12	9
(Nazi Germany)	Engelbert Uridil	1	1			1		2	1

== Fixtures and results ==
Win Draw Loss

=== Gauliga ===
Rd	Date	Venue	Opponent	Res.	Att.	Goals and discipline
1	17.12.1939	A	Wiener SC	1-1	6,000	Hofer 14'
2	24.09.1939	H	Vienna	1-2	3,000	Hofstätter 89'
3	15.10.1939	A	Wacker Wien	4-3	17,000	Binder 3' 63' 82', Kaburek M. 20'
4	29.10.1939	A	Admira	4-1	13,000	Binder 9' 11', Pesser 36', Hofer 60'
5	05.11.1939	H	Austria Wien	9-2	7,000	Binder 32' 59' 82' 85', Fellner 34' 43' 88', Kaburek M. 47', Pesser 75'
6	14.01.1940	A	Fiat Wien	3-1	7,000	Binder 47' 68', Pesser 62'
7	25.12.1939	H	FC Wien	3-0	6,000	Binder 15' 25', Fellner 89'
8	11.02.1940	A	Vienna	5-5	10,000	Pesser 9', Fellner 15' 29' 46', Binder 32'
9	17.03.1940	H	Wiener SC	0-3	9,000	
10	28.04.1940	H	Wacker Wien	4-1	15,000	Binder 29', Pesser 62' 77', Schors 87'
11	21.04.1940	H	Admira	1-2	25,000	Fitz 55'
12	04.02.1940	A	Austria Wien	4-1	8,500	Kaburek M. 17' 39', Binder 63', Fellner 82'
13	10.03.1940	H	Fiat Wien	7-1	5,000	Schors 12', Pesser 40', Kaburek M. 52' 85', Maier 65' (o.g.), Binder 70' 88'
14	01.05.1940	A	FC Wien	4-1	2,200	Hofstätter 40', Dvoracek 49', Kaburek M. 77', Uridil E. 78'

=== German championship ===
Rd	Date	Venue	Opponent	Res.	Att.	Goals and discipline
G1	12.05.1940	H	Graslitz	7-0	7,000	Binder 2' 7' (pen.) 21' 48' 76' (pen.) 85', Dvoracek 74'
G2	19.05.1940	H	Gleiwitz	3-1	500	Binder 43' (pen.) 87', Dvoracek 46'
G3	26.05.1940	A	Graslitz	7-1	3,000	Dvoracek 2', Pesser, Kaburek M. 15' 52', Binder 49'
G4	02.06.1940	A	Gleiwitz	2-2	18,000	Dvoracek 47', Fitz 65'
QF-L1	23.06.1940	H	Union Berlin	3-2	18,000	Kaburek M. 11', Dvoracek 76' (pen.) 77'
QF-L2	30.06.1940	A	Union Berlin	3-1	60,000	Binder 23' 73' 75'
SF	14.07.1940	N	Dresdner SC	1-2 (a.e.t.)	40,000	Binder 2'
P3	21.07.1940	N	Waldhof Mannheim	4-4 (a.e.t.)	90,000	Dvoracek 4' 16', Schors 31', Fitz 44'
P3-PO	28.07.1940	N	Waldhof Mannheim	5-2	30,000	Pesser 17' 23' 32', Dvoracek 43', Schors 55'

=== Tschammerpokal ===
Rd	Date	Venue	Opponent	Res.	Att.	Goals and discipline
Q1	16.04.1939	H	Red Star	6-2	2,500	Binder 30' 60', Hofer 35' 40', Pesser 46', Schors 63'
Q2	30.04.1939	A	Bayern	5-2	20,000	Binder 71' 75', Schors 77', Pesser
Q3	18.05.1939	H	Regensburg	4-2	11,000	Binder 23', Schors 10', Holec 44'
R1	10.12.1939	H	Gleiwitz	6-1	7,500	Pesser 44', Kaburek M. 51' 75' 78', Binder 76' 85' (pen.)
QF	07.01.1940	A	BW Berlin	7-1	25,000	Binder 1' 38' 58' 69' 75' (pen.), Pesser 2', Fellner 28'
SF	31.03.1940	H	FC Nürnberg	0-1	40,000	
