= 1936–37 SK Rapid Wien season =

Rapid Wien
1936–37 season
- Coach: Leopold Nitsch
- Stadium: Pfarrwiese, Vienna, Austria
- Nationalliga: 5th
- Austrian Cup: Semifinals
- Top goalscorer: League: Franz Binder (29); All: Franz Binder (37)
- Average home league attendance: 8,900

The 1936–37 SK Rapid Wien season was the 39th season in club history.

== Squad ==
=== Squad statistics ===
Nat.	Name	League		Cup		Total		Discipline
Nat.	Name	Apps	Goals	Apps	Goals	Apps	Goals	Red card
Goalkeepers
(Austria)	Fritz Krausam	2				2		
(Austria)	Rudolf Raftl	20		4		24		
Defenders
(Austria)	Leopold Czejka	1				1		
(Austria)	Karl Jestrab	21		3		24		
(Austria)	Johann Luef	19		4		23		
(Austria)	Viktor Runa	1				1		
(Austria)	Heribert Sperner	1		1		2		
(Austria)	Ludwig Tauschek	4				4		
(Austria)	Stefan Wagner	2		1		3		
Midfielders
(Austria)	Josef Blaschke	3				3		
(Austria)	Friedrich Kedziersky	1				1		
(Austria)	Max Merkel	1				1		
(Austria)	Stefan Skoumal	21		4		25		
(Austria)	Josef Smistik	16	1	4		20	1	1
(Austria)	Franz Wagner	13				13		
Forwards
(Austria)	Lukas Aurednik	7		2	1	9	1	
(Austria)	Franz Binder	22	29	4	8	26	37	1
(Austria)	Hermann Dvoracek	2	1			2	1	
(Austria)	Johann Flegel	4	1			4	1	
(Austria)	Rudolf Hawlicek	2		2	1	4	1	
(Austria)	Wilhelm Holec	8	2	1		9	2	
(Austria)	Franz Kaspirek	1				1		
(Austria)	Johann Meister	13	6	1		14	6	
(Austria)	Johann Ostermann	11	2			11	2	
(Austria)	Hans Pesser	19	3	4	2	23	5	
(Austria)	Walter Probst	11	3	3	1	14	4	
(Austria)	Franz Smistik	11	3	3		14	3	
(Austria)	August Zopp	5		3	5	8	5	

== Fixtures and results ==
Win Draw Loss

=== League ===
Rd	Date	Venue	Opponent	Res.	Att.	Goals and discipline
1	30.08.1936	H	Hakoah	5-1	9,000	Meister 31' 54', Binder 41' 46', Ostermann 75'
2	05.09.1936	A	Wiener SC	2-2	6,000	Binder 6' 48'
3	13.09.1936	A	FC Wien	1-3	9,500	Binder 86'
4	20.09.1936	H	Austria Wien	1-1	16,000	Pesser 80'
5	04.10.1936	A	Admira	0-0	13,000	
6	11.10.1936	H	FAC	1-2	3,500	Dvoracek 2'
7	18.10.1936	A	Vienna	2-2	26,000	Binder 34' (pen.), Meister 51'
8	25.10.1936	H	Wacker Wien	6-1	13,000	Binder 2' 47' 68' 70', Ostermann 36', Pesser 55'
9	29.11.1936	A	FavAC	0-2	4,000	
10	15.11.1936	H	Libertas	5-3	8,000	Binder 24' 29' 30', Probst W. 41', Pesser 84'
11	22.11.1936	A	Post	2-2	6,000	Meister 20', Binder 38'
12	14.02.1937	A	FAC	1-2	5,000	Binder 50'
13	21.02.1937	H	Vienna	2-4	12,000	Binder 10', Meister 55'
14	28.02.1937	A	Wacker Wien	0-3	11,000	
15	07.03.1937	H	FavAC	6-0	9,500	Meister 3', Smistik F. 24' 72', Probst W. 36', Smistik J. 49', Binder 63' (pen.)
16	14.03.1937	A	Libertas	0-1	13,000	
17	12.05.1937	H	Post	6-2	3,000	Binder 2' 27' 42' 52' (pen.), Flegel 28', Holec 88' (pen.)
18	18.04.1937	A	Hakoah	2-0	8,000	Probst W. 27', Binder 37'
19	25.04.1937	H	Wiener SC	1-1	8,500	Binder 17'
20	02.05.1937	H	FC Wien	5-0	8,000	Binder 18' 20' 75' (pen.) 87', Smistik F. 88'
21	16.05.1937	A	Austria Wien	0-5	14,000	Binder (red card) 62', Smistik J. (red card) 62'
22	30.05.1937	H	Admira	3-3	7,000	Binder 8' 40', Holec 61'

=== Cup ===
Rd	Date	Venue	Opponent	Res.	Att.	Goals and discipline
R1	06.12.1936	H	Ostbahn XI	7-1	1,000	Binder 9' 16' 64' 65', Hawlicek 72', Pesser 81' 83'
R16	07.02.1937	H	FC Wien	3-1	4,000	Binder 17' 73' 86'
QF	11.04.1937	A	FAC	6-4	18,000	Zopp 5' 25' 75', Probst W. 21', Aurednik 30', Binder 71'
SF	21.04.1937	A	Wiener SC	2-3	15,000	Zopp 1' 68'
