= 1941–42 SK Rapid Wien season =

Rapid Wien
1941–42 season
- Coach: Leopold Nitsch
- Stadium: Pfarrwiese, Vienna, Austria
- Gauliga: 3rd
- Tschammerpokal: 2nd round
- Top goalscorer: League: Fritz Roth (8); All: Franz Binder (11)
- Average home league attendance: 9,700

The 1941–42 SK Rapid Wien season was the 44th season in club history.

== Squad ==
=== Squad statistics ===
Nat.	Name	Gauliga		Cup		Total	
Nat.	Name	Apps	Goals	Apps	Goals	Apps	Goals
Goalkeepers
(Nazi Germany)	Josef Musil	16				16	
(Nazi Germany)	Rudolf Raftl			2		2	
Defenders
(Nazi Germany)	Friedrich Pimperl	5				5	
(Nazi Germany)	Heribert Sperner	6		2		8	
(Nazi Germany)	Stefan Wagner	11		2		13	
Midfielders
(Nazi Germany)	Leopold Gernhardt	16	1	2		18	1
(Nazi Germany)	Johann Hofstätter	13				13	
(Nazi Germany)	Stefan Skoumal			2		2	
(Nazi Germany)	Engelbert Smutny	16	1			16	1
(Nazi Germany)	Franz Wagner	12		2		14	
Forwards
(Nazi Germany)	Franz Binder	8	6	2	5	10	11
(Nazi Germany)	Hermann Dvoracek	13	2	2	1	15	3
(Nazi Germany)	Willy Fitz	15	2	2	1	17	3
(Nazi Germany)	Robert Grüneis	2				2	
(Nazi Germany)	Josef Hassmann	3				3	
(Nazi Germany)	Wilhelm Holec	4	5			4	5
(Nazi Germany)	Franz Kaspirek	3				3	
(Nazi Germany)	Josef Neumann	1				1	
(Nazi Germany)	Hans Pesser	4	2	2		6	2
(Nazi Germany)	Fritz Roth	9	8			9	8
(Nazi Germany)	Georg Schors	12	6	2		14	6
(Nazi Germany)	Engelbert Uridil	7	6			7	6

== Fixtures and results ==
Win Draw Loss

=== Gauliga ===
Rd	Date	Venue	Opponent	Res.	Att.	Goals and discipline
1	31.08.1941	A	Post	3-1	8,000	Holec 42' 56', Binder 87'
2	07.09.1941	H	Wiener SC	2-1	16,000	Holec 7', Binder 76'
3	21.09.1941	A	FAC	4-2	18,000	Schors 32', Holec 35' 72', Binder 78'
4	05.10.1941	A	Vienna	1-4	22,000	Binder 15'
5	12.10.1941	H	Austria Wien	2-2	12,000	Schors 52', Binder 66'
6	19.10.1941	A	Admira	4-0	20,000	Gernhardt 29', Schors 62', Pesser 63', Binder 90'
7	02.11.1941	H	FC Wien	0-4	12,000	
8	16.11.1941	A	Wacker Wien	0-2	8,000	
10	04.01.1942	H	Post	2-0	5,000	Uridil E. 12', Roth 40'
11	11.01.1942	A	Wiener SC	2-4	5,000	Dvoracek 56', Roth 68'
12	07.12.1941	H	FAC	10-2	5,000	Pesser 6', Roth 18' 71' 78', Schors 22' 31' 77', Uridil E. 42' 82', Fitz 65'
13	15.03.1942	H	Vienna	0-1	10,500	
14	22.03.1942	A	Austria Wien	4-3	15,000	Roth 48' 59', Uridil E. 68'
15	29.03.1942	H	Admira	1-1	11,000	Uridil E. 39'
16	05.04.1942	A	FC Wien	2-2	22,000	Dvoracek 20', Roth 75'
17	12.04.1942	H	Wacker Wien	2-1	6,000	Fitz 17', Smutny 29'

=== Tschammerpokal ===
Rd	Date	Venue	Opponent	Res.	Att.	Goals and discipline
R1	08.07.1941	H	FC Wien	4-3	6,500	Binder 47' 51' 58', Fitz 55'
R2	03.08.1941	H	Admira	3-5	15,000	Binder 9' 60', Dvoracek 35'
