= 1945–46 SK Rapid Wien season =

Rapid Wien
1945–46 season
- Coach: Hans Pesser
- Stadium: Pfarrwiese, Vienna, Austria
- Liga: Champions (15th title)
- Cup: Winner (4th title)
- Top goalscorer: League: Lukas Aurednik (28); All: Lukas Aurednik (35)
- Average home league attendance: 11,700

The 1945–46 SK Rapid Wien season was the 48th season in club history.

== Squad ==
=== Squad statistics ===
Nat.	Name	Age	League		Cup		Total	
Nat.	Name	Age	Apps	Goals	Apps	Goals	Apps	Goals
Goalkeepers
(Austria)	Josef Musil	24	3		1		4	
(Austria)	Walter Zeman	18	19		4		23	
Defenders
(Austria)	Fritz Durlach	29	4				4	
(Austria)	Ernst Happel	19	6		3		9	
(Austria)	Franz Rybicki	20	14		2		16	
(Austria)	Engelbert Smutny	28	21		5		26	
(Austria)	Stefan Wagner	31	1				1	
Midfielders
(Austria)	Johann Bauer	16	3				3	
(Austria)	Karl Domnanich	20	2				2	
(Austria)	Leopold Gernhardt	25	10	2	4		14	2
(Austria)	Franz Hofer	26	15	4	2	1	17	5
(Austria)	Josef Kirner	28	1				1	
(Austria)	Franz Knor	21	5	1			5	1
(Austria)	Franz Prak	19	2		2		4	
(Austria)	Georg Schors	31	14	3	2		16	3
(Austria)	Franz Wagner	33	13		4		17	
Forwards
(Austria)	Lukas Aurednik	27	20	28	3	7	23	35
(Austria)	Franz Binder	33	13	17	3	7	16	24
(Austria)	Willy Fitz	27	15	6	4		19	6
(Austria)	Josef Hartl	28	16	12	2		18	12
(Austria)	Franz Kaspirek	27	17	7	5	2	22	9
(Austria)	Alfred Körner	19	12	9	5	2	17	11
(Austria)	Robert Körner	20	16	8	4	2	20	10

== Fixtures and results ==
Win Draw Loss

=== League ===
Rd	Date	Venue	Opponent	Res.	Att.	Goals and discipline
1	02.09.1945	A	Ostbahn XI	9-1	7,000	Aurednik 38' 56', Hartl J. 44' 68' 80' 84' 89', Gernhardt 53', Körner A. 69'
2	09.09.1945	H	Wiener AC	4-1	11,000	Fitz 3', Hartl J. 33' 80', Körner A. 35'
3	16.09.1945	A	Admira	1-1	12,000	Körner R. 52'
4	23.09.1945	H	Oberlaa	5-1	8,500	Fitz 25', Schors 42' 74' 78', Hartl J. 53'
5	30.09.1945	A	Wacker Wien	3-3	15,000	Kaspirek 11', Fitz 35', Hartl J. 72'
6	07.10.1945	H	Vienna	0-3	6,000	
7	14.10.1945	A	Wiener SC	5-1	12,000	Knor F. 12', Aurednik 39' 72', Kaspirek 79', Hartl J. 82'
8	21.10.1945	H	Helfort	4-1	15,000	Hartl J. 20' 69', Aurednik 79', Kaspirek 85'
9	28.10.1945	H	FC Wien	1-0	10,000	Binder 4'
10	04.11.1945	H	Austria Wien	0-0	22,000	
11	11.11.1945	H	FAC	9-0	6,000	Fitz 16' 33' 48', Kaspirek 22', Binder 50' 72' 79' 86', Aurednik 55'
12	27.03.1946	H	Ostbahn XI	10-0	7,000	Kaspirek, Körner R., Binder, Aurednik
13	24.02.1946	A	Wiener AC	9-0	8,000	Körner A. 7', Aurednik 20' 27', Binder 30' 39' 43', Körner R. 49' 75', Hofer 57'
14	03.03.1946	H	Admira	5-1	10,000	Aurednik 1' 7' 60', Körner A. 12', Körner R. 62'
15	18.03.1946	A	Oberlaa	6-1	10,000	Körner A. 17' 82', Aurednik 72' 80', Kaspirek 73', Hofer 79'
16	24.03.1946	H	Wiener SC	6-2	25,000	Binder 39' 69', Kaspirek 46', Hofer 49' 56', Aurednik 87'
17	23.06.1946	H	Wacker Wien	1-4	8,000	Binder 4'
18	07.04.1946	A	Vienna	6-0	31,000	Schaffer 15' (o.g.), Körner A. 27', Sabeditsch 27' (o.g.), Körner R. 51', Gernhardt 58', Aurednik 90'
19	11.05.1946	A	Helfort	1-2	14,000	Aurednik 9'
20	19.05.1946	A	FC Wien	5-1	26,000	Aurednik 6' 26' 63', Körner A. 16', Körner R. 47'
21	26.05.1946	A	Austria Wien	5-1	40,000	Körner A., Binder 10' 43'
22	02.06.1946	A	FAC	4-0	15,000	Aurednik, Binder

=== Cup ===
Rd	Date	Venue	Opponent	Res.	Att.	Goals and discipline
R1	10.02.1946	A	Red Star	7-1	2,000	Körner R., Körner A., Aurednik
R16	10.03.1946	H	Admira	4-1	20,000	Körner R., Kaspirek, Hofer, Aurednik
QF	28.04.1946	H	Wiener SC	4-2	14,000	Körner A., Kaspirek, Binder
SF	30.05.1946	H	FC Wien	4-0	25,000	Aurednik, Binder
F	20.06.1946	N	Vienna	2-1	50,000	Binder 5' 85'
