= 1938 Tschammerpokal final =

- Match programme cover
- Event: 1938 Tschammerpokal
FSV Frankfurt	Rapid Wien
1	3
- Date: 8 January 1939
- Venue: Olympiastadion, Berlin
- Referee: Fritz Rühle (Merseburg)
- Attendance: 40,000

The 1938 Tschammerpokal final decided the winner of the 1938 Tschammerpokal, the 4th season of Germany's knockout football cup competition. It was played on 8 January 1939 at the Olympiastadion in Berlin. Rapid Wien won the match 3–1 against FSV Frankfurt, to claim their 1st cup title.

== Route to the final ==
The Tschammerpokal began the final stage with 78 teams in a single-elimination knockout cup competition. Midway through the competition, Austrian teams were merged into the competition following the Anschluss. There were a total of six rounds leading up to the final for the German teams, and a total of three for the Austrian teams. Teams were drawn against each other, and the winner after 90 minutes would advance. If still tied, 30 minutes of extra time was played. If the score was still level, a replay would take place at the original away team's stadium. If still level after 90 minutes, 30 minutes of extra time was played. If the score was still level, a second replay would take place at the original home team's stadium. If still level after 90 minutes, 30 minutes of extra time was played. If the score was still level, a drawing of lots would decide who would advance to the next round.

Note: In all results below, the score of the finalist is given first (H: home; A: away).

FSV Frankfurt		Round	Rapid Wien
Opponent	Result	1938 Tschammerpokal	Opponent	Result
CSC 03 Kassel (A)	1–0	Round 1	Bye
BC Hartha (H)	3–1	Round 2	Bye
Fortuna Düsseldorf (H)	3–1	Round of 16	Bye
VfB Mühlburg (H)	3–1	Quarter-finals (split)	Amateure Fiat Wien (H)	5–1
1860 Munich (A)	2–1 (a.e.t.)	Quarter-finals (combined)	Waldhof Mannheim (A)	3–2
Wiener Sport-Club (H)	3–2	Semi-finals	1. FC Nürnberg (H)	2–0

== Match ==
=== Details ===
8 January 1939

FSV Frankfurt	1–3	Rapid Wien
Dosedzal 17'	Report	Schors 80'; Hofstätter 85'; Binder 90'

Olympiastadion, Berlin
Attendance: 40,000
Referee: Fritz Rühle (Merseburg)

FSV Frankfurt	Rapid Wien

GK	1	(Germany) Hans Wolf
RB		(Germany) Willy May
LB		(Germany) Heinrich Schweinhardt
RH		(Germany) Arthur Böttgen
CH		(Germany) Heinrich Dietsch
LH		(Germany) Fritz Fend
OR		(Germany) Bubi Armbruster (c)
IR		(Germany) Karl Heldmann
CF		(Germany) Franz Dosedzal
IL		(Germany) Franz Faust
OL		(Germany) Heini Wörner
Manager:
(Germany) Martin Eiling

GK	1	(Germany) Rudolf Raftl
RB		(Germany) Heribert Sperner
LB		(Germany) Rudolf Schlauf
RH		(Germany) Franz Wagner
CH		(Germany) Johann Hofstätter
LH		(Germany) Stefan Skoumal
OR		(Germany) Franz Hofer
IR		(Germany) Georg Schors
CF		(Germany) Franz Binder (c)
IL		(Germany) Wilhelm Holec
OL		(Germany) Hans Pesser
Manager:
(Germany) Leopold Nitsch

Match rules

- 90 minutes.
- 30 minutes of extra time if necessary.
- Replay if scores still level.
- No substitutions.
