= 1941 German football championship =

1941 German championship
Deutsche Fussball Kriegsmeisterschaft
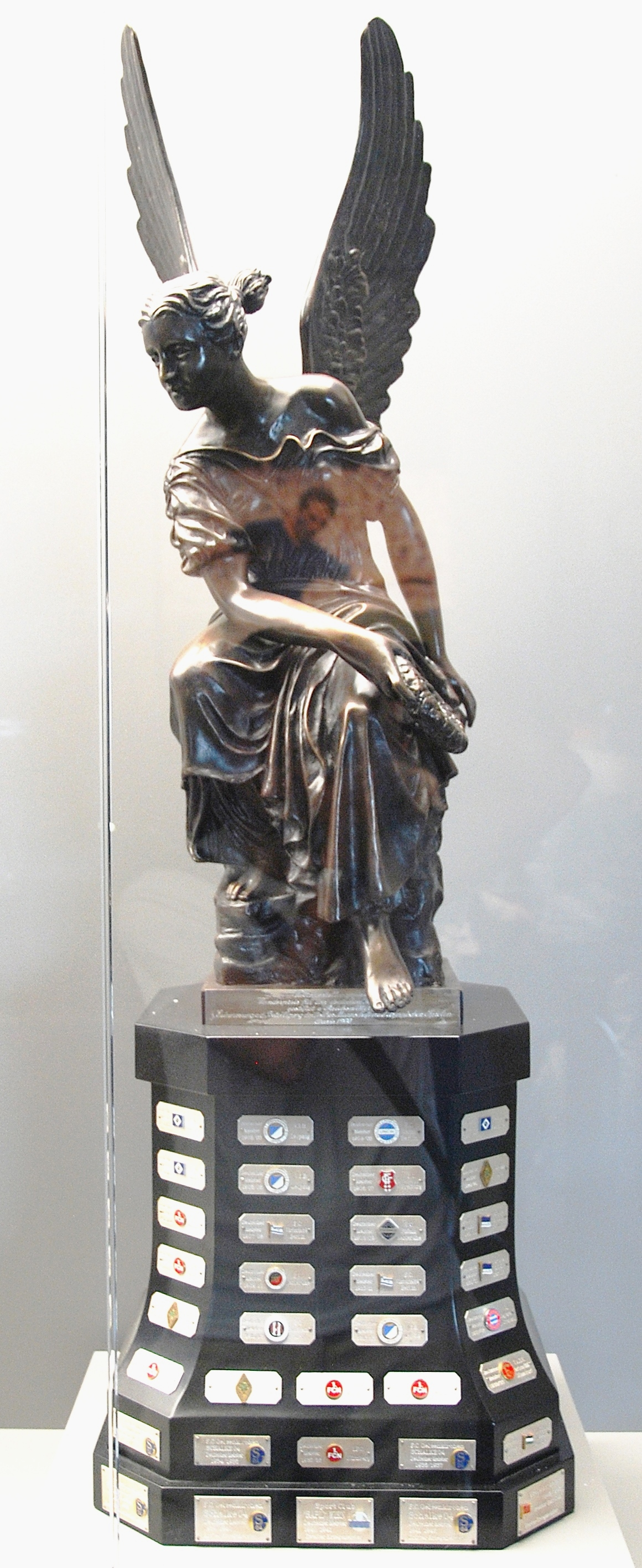
- Replica of the Viktoria trophy

Tournament details
- Country: Germany
- Dates: 6 April – 22 June
- Teams: 20

Final positions
- Champions: Rapid Wien; 1st German title
- Runners-up: Schalke 04
- Third place: Dresdner SC
- Fourth place: VfL Köln 99

Tournament statistics
- Matches played: 56
- Goals scored: 248 (4.43 per match)
- Top goal scorer: Hermann Eppenhoff (15 goals)

The 1941 German football championship, the 34th edition of the competition, was won by SK Rapid Wien, the club's sole German championship. Rapid, which had previously won twelve Austrian football championships between 1911 and 1938 as well as the 1938 German Cup, won the competition by defeating Schalke 04 4–3 in the final. The final was held on 22 June 1941, the same day Nazi Germany invaded the Soviet Union in Operation Barbarossa.

== Overview ==
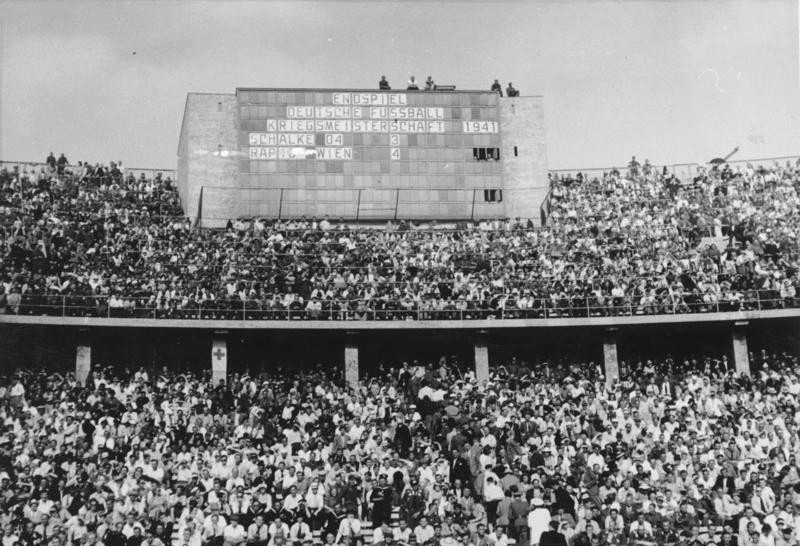
The score board of the 1941 final

FC Schalke 04, having won five of the previous seven finals, being the defending champions and aiming for an unprecedented third consecutive German championship, were the favourites and led the final 3–0 after 57 minutes but Rapid scored four unanswered goals, the last three of them by Franz Binder, to win the championship. It marked the second of three occasions of a club from Vienna (German: Wien) in the final, Rapid becoming the only one to win the competition while Admira Wien had made a losing appearance in the 1939 final and First Vienna FC would do the same in 1942. Austrian clubs had played in the German league system from 1938, after the Anschluss, until the German surrender in 1945.

Rapid's victory led to a number of conspiracy theories. On Schalke's side it was speculated that Rapid was allowed to win to award a national championship to a club from the Ostmark while, in Austria, the theory developed that Rapid players were punished after the final by being sent to the front line. Both theories were disproven when Rapid, in 2009, commissioned a study into the history of the club during the Nazi era and found no evidence for either. Rapid continues to list both German titles, the 1941 championship and the 1938 cup win, in its honours.

Schalke's Hermann Eppenhoff became the top scorer of the 1941 championship with 15 goals, the highest individual amount for any player in the history of the competition from 1903 to 1963.

The twenty 1940–41 Gauliga champions, two more than in 1940 because of the addition of the Gauliga Elsaß and Gauliga Danzig-Westpreußen, competed in a group stage with the four group winners advancing to the semi-finals. The two semi-final winners then contested the 1941 championship final. The groups were divided into two with four clubs and two with six clubs with the latter, in turn, subdivided into two groups of three teams each and a final of these group winners to determine the overall group champions.

In the following season, the German championship was played with twenty five clubs. From there it gradually expanded further through a combination of territorial expansion of Nazi Germany and the sub-dividing of the Gauligas in later years, reaching a strength of thirty-one in its last completed season, 1943–44.

== Qualified teams ==
The teams qualified through the 1940–41 Gauliga season:

| Club | Qualified from |
| VfL Neckarau | Gauliga Baden |
| TSV 1860 München | Gauliga Bayern |
| Tennis Borussia Berlin | Gauliga Berlin-Brandenburg |
| Preußen Danzig | Gauliga Danzig-Westpreußen |
| FC Mühlhausen 93 | Gauliga Elsaß |
| Borussia Fulda | Gauliga Hessen |
| SV Jena | Gauliga Mitte |
| VfL 99 Köln | Gauliga Mittelrhein |
| TuS Helene Altenessen | Gauliga Niederrhein |
| Hannover 96 | Gauliga Niedersachsen |
| Hamburger SV | Gauliga Nordmark |
| SK Rapid Wien | Gauliga Ostmark |
| VfB Königsberg | Gauliga Ostpreußen |
| LSV Stettin | Gauliga Pommern |
| Dresdner SC | Gauliga Sachsen |
| Vorwärts-Rasensport Gleiwitz | Gauliga Schlesien |
| NSTG Prag | Gauliga Sudetenland |
| Kickers Offenbach | Gauliga Südwest |
| Schalke 04 | Gauliga Westfalen |
| Stuttgarter Kickers | Gauliga Württemberg |

- Vorwärts-Rasensport Gleiwitz replaced Germania Königshütte for the finals.

== Competition ==
=== Group 1 ===
==== Group 1A ====
Group 1A was contested by the champions of the Gauligas Danzig-Westpreußen, Pommern and Schlesien:

| Pos | Team | Pld | W | D | L | GF | GA | GR | Pts | Qualification | VRG | LSV | DAN |
|---|---|---|---|---|---|---|---|---|---|---|---|---|---|
| 1 | Vorwärts-Rasensport Gleiwitz | 4 | 2 | 1 | 1 | 9 | 5 | 1.800 | 5 | Advance to group final | — | 3–1 | 4–1 |
| 2 | LSV Stettin | 4 | 1 | 2 | 1 | 8 | 9 | 0.889 | 4 | | 3–2 | — | 1–1 |
| 3 | Preußen Danzig | 4 | 0 | 3 | 1 | 5 | 8 | 0.625 | 3 | | 0–0 | 3–3 | — |

Source: RSSSF
Rules for classification: 1) Points; 2) Goal ratio.

==== Group 1B ====
Group 1B was contested by the champions of the Gauligas Brandenburg, Sachsen and Sudetenland:

| Pos | Team | Pld | W | D | L | GF | GA | GR | Pts | Qualification | DRE | TBB | PRA |
|---|---|---|---|---|---|---|---|---|---|---|---|---|---|
| 1 | Dresdner SC | 4 | 4 | 0 | 0 | 11 | 4 | 2.750 | 8 | Advance to group final | — | 5–2 | 4–2 |
| 2 | Tennis Borussia Berlin | 4 | 1 | 1 | 2 | 5 | 7 | 0.714 | 3 | | 0–1 | — | 3–1 |
| 3 | NSTG Prag | 4 | 0 | 1 | 3 | 3 | 8 | 0.375 | 1 | | 0–1 | 0–0 | — |

Source: RSSSF
Rules for classification: 1) Points; 2) Goal ratio.

==== Group 1 final ====
| Team 1 | Agg. | Team 2 | 1st leg | 2nd leg |
|---|---|---|---|---|
| Dresdner SC | 6–0 | Vorwärts-Rasensport Gleiwitz | 3–0 | 3–0 |

=== Group 2 ===
==== Group 2A ====
Group 2A was contested by the champions of the Gauligas Mitte, Nordmark and Ostpreußen:

| Pos | Team | Pld | W | D | L | GF | GA | GR | Pts | Qualification | HSV | SVJ | KON |
|---|---|---|---|---|---|---|---|---|---|---|---|---|---|
| 1 | Hamburger SV | 4 | 3 | 1 | 0 | 9 | 5 | 1.800 | 7 | Advance to group final | — | 2–1 | 3–1 |
| 2 | 1. SV Jena | 4 | 1 | 1 | 2 | 9 | 8 | 1.125 | 3 | | 2–2 | — | 2–4 |
| 3 | VfB Königsberg | 4 | 1 | 0 | 3 | 6 | 11 | 0.545 | 2 | | 1–2 | 0–4 | — |

Source: RSSSF
Rules for classification: 1) Points; 2) Goal ratio.

==== Group 2B ====
Group 2B was contested by the champions of the Gauligas Hessen, Niedersachsen and Westfalen:

| Pos | Team | Pld | W | D | L | GF | GA | GR | Pts | Qualification | S04 | H96 | FUL |
|---|---|---|---|---|---|---|---|---|---|---|---|---|---|
| 1 | Schalke 04 | 4 | 4 | 0 | 0 | 16 | 2 | 8.000 | 8 | Advance to group final | — | 4–0 | 4–0 |
| 2 | Hannover 96 | 4 | 1 | 0 | 3 | 10 | 15 | 0.667 | 2 | | 1–6 | — | 6–1 |
| 3 | Borussia Fulda | 4 | 1 | 0 | 3 | 6 | 15 | 0.400 | 2 | | 1–2 | 4–3 | — |

Source: RSSSF
Rules for classification: 1) Points; 2) Goal ratio.

==== Group 2 final ====
| Team 1 | Agg. | Team 2 | 1st leg | 2nd leg |
|---|---|---|---|---|
| Schalke 04 | 3–1 | Hamburger SV | 3–0 | 0–1 |

=== Group 3 ===
Group 3 was contested by the champions of the Gauligas Elsaß, Mittelrhein, Niederrhein and Südwest:

| Pos | Team | Pld | W | D | L | GF | GA | GR | Pts | Qualification | K99 | KOF | HEA | M93 |
|---|---|---|---|---|---|---|---|---|---|---|---|---|---|---|
| 1 | VfL Köln | 6 | 4 | 1 | 1 | 19 | 12 | 1.583 | 9 | Advance to semi-finals | — | 3–1 | 3–1 | 6–1 |
| 2 | Kickers Offenbach | 6 | 3 | 2 | 1 | 19 | 9 | 2.111 | 8 | | 2–2 | — | 1–1 | 5–1 |
| 3 | Helene Altenessen | 6 | 2 | 2 | 2 | 15 | 13 | 1.154 | 6 | | 6–1 | 0–4 | — | 5–2 |
| 4 | FC Mülhausen | 6 | 0 | 1 | 5 | 9 | 28 | 0.321 | 1 | | 1–4 | 2–6 | 2–2 | — |

Source: RSSSF
Rules for classification: 1) Points; 2) Goal ratio.

=== Group 4 ===
Group 4 was contested by the champions of the Gauligas Bayern, Baden, Ostmark and Württemberg:

| Pos | Team | Pld | W | D | L | GF | GA | GR | Pts | Qualification | RWI | M60 | SKI | NEC |
|---|---|---|---|---|---|---|---|---|---|---|---|---|---|---|
| 1 | Rapid Wien | 6 | 4 | 1 | 1 | 24 | 5 | 4.800 | 9 | Advance to semi-finals | — | 2–0 | 1–1 | 8–1 |
| 2 | 1860 Munich | 6 | 3 | 1 | 2 | 14 | 11 | 1.273 | 7 | | 2–1 | — | 2–1 | 6–2 |
| 3 | Stuttgarter Kickers | 6 | 1 | 2 | 3 | 11 | 16 | 0.688 | 4 | | 1–5 | 3–3 | — | 2–0 |
| 4 | VfL Neckarau | 6 | 2 | 0 | 4 | 10 | 27 | 0.370 | 4 | | 0–7 | 2–1 | 5–3 | — |

Source: RSSSF
Rules for classification: 1) Points; 2) Goal ratio.

=== Semi-finals ===
Three of the four clubs in the 1941 semi-finals had reached the same stage in the previous season, Rapid Wien, Dresdner SC and FC Schalke 04, while VfL Köln 99 replaced SV Waldhof Mannheim in comparison to 1940:

| Team 1 | Score | Team 2 |
|---|---|---|
8 June 1941
| SK Rapid Wien | 2–1 | Dresdner SC |
| Schalke 04 | 4–1 | VfL Köln 99 |

=== Third place play-off ===
| Team 1 | Score | Team 2 |
|---|---|---|
22 June 1941
| Dresdner SC | 4–1 | VfL Köln 99 |

=== Final ===
22 June 1941
16:00

| SK Rapid Wien | 4–3 | Schalke 04 |
|---|---|---|
| Schors 60'; Binder 62' 65' (pen.) 71' | Report | Hinz 5' 58'; Eppenhoff 8' |

Olympia Stadium (Berlin)
Attendance: 90,000
Referee: A. Reinhardt (Stuttgart)

SPORTKLUB RAPID:
| GK | (Nazi Germany) Rudolf Raftl |
| RB | (Nazi Germany) Stefan Wagner |
| CH | (Nazi Germany) Leopold Gernhardt |
| LB | (Nazi Germany) Heribert Sperner |
| RH | (Nazi Germany) Franz Wagner |
| LH | (Nazi Germany) Stefan Skoumal |
| OR | (Nazi Germany) Willy Fitz |
| IR | (Nazi Germany) Georg Schors |
| CF | (Nazi Germany) Franz Binder (c) |
| IL | (Nazi Germany) Hermann Dvoracek |
| OL | (Nazi Germany) Hans Pesser |
Manager:
(Nazi Germany) Leopold Nitsch

FC SCHALKE 04:
| GK | (Nazi Germany) Hans Klodt |
| RB | (Nazi Germany) Hans Bornemann |
| CB | (Nazi Germany) Otto Tibulsky |
| LB | (Nazi Germany) Otto Schweisfurth |
| RH | (Nazi Germany) Bernhard Füller |
| LH | (Nazi Germany) Rudolf Gellesch |
| IR | (Nazi Germany) Fritz Szepan |
| IL | (Nazi Germany) Ernst Kuzorra (c) |
| OR | (Nazi Germany) Herbert Burdenski |
| CF | (Nazi Germany) Hermann Eppenhoff |
| OL | (Nazi Germany) Heinz Hinz |
Manager:
(Nazi Germany) Otto Faist
