= 1947–48 SK Rapid Wien season =

Rapid Wien
1947–48 season
- Coach: Hans Pesser
- Stadium: Pfarrwiese, Vienna, Austria
- Liga: Champions (16th title)
- Cup: Quarterfinals
- Top goalscorer: League: Leopold Ströll (16); All: Alfred Körner (19)
- Average home league attendance: 20,300

The 1947–48 SK Rapid Wien season was the 50th season in club history.

== Squad ==
=== Squad statistics ===
Nat.	Name	Age	League		Cup		Total	
Nat.	Name	Age	Apps	Goals	Apps	Goals	Apps	Goals
Goalkeepers
(Austria)	Josef Musil	26	9		1		10	
(Austria)	Walter Zeman	20	9		2		11	
Defenders
(Austria)	Ernst Happel	21	15		3		18	
(Austria)	Stefan Wagner	33	17		2		19	
Midfielders
(Austria)	Leopold Gernhardt	27	18	2	3	1	21	3
(Austria)	Franz Golobic	25	8		2		10	
(Austria)	Franz Kaspirek	29	18	1	3		21	1
(Austria)	Max Merkel	28	9	1			9	1
(Austria)	Franz Wagner	35	15		2		17	
Forwards
(Austria)	Franz Binder	35	17	11	3	2	20	13
(Austria)	Friedrich Csarmann		4				4	
(Austria)	Karl Domnanich	22	1	1	1	1	2	2
(Austria)	Adalbert Kaubek	21	1				1	
(Austria)	Roman Knor	20	4	3	3	1	7	4
(Austria)	Alfred Körner	21	17	14	3	5	20	19
(Austria)	Robert Körner	22	16	4	2	2	18	6
(Austria)	Franz Lukas	32			1	2	1	2
(Austria)	Erich Müller	19	1	1			1	1
(Austria)	Walter Schiff		1	1			1	1
(Austria)	Leopold Ströll	25	18	16	2	2	20	18

== Fixtures and results ==
Win Draw Loss

=== League ===
Rd	Date	Venue	Opponent	Res.	Att.	Goals and discipline
1	31.08.1947	H	Oberlaa	6-3	15,000	Körner A. 7' 68', Ströll 35' 58', Binder 51', Gernhardt 66'
2	07.09.1947	A	Wacker Wien	4-2	50,000	Körner A. 11', Binder 27' 53', Merkel 48'
3	21.09.1947	H	Wiener SC	1-0	32,000	Domnanich K. 37'
4	28.09.1947	A	Vienna	4-3	32,000	Körner A. 35' 47' 76', Binder 40'
5	12.10.1947	H	FAC	5-0	20,000	Binder 12', Körner R. 16' (pen.), Körner A. 59' 85', Ströll 74'
6	19.10.1947	A	Wiener AC	5-0	20,000	Körner R. 8' (pen.), Körner A. 54', Ströll 60' 78' 85'
7	26.10.1947	H	Admira	1-2	8,000	Körner A. 14'
8	02.11.1947	A	FC Wien	1-0	20,000	Binder 69'
9	23.11.1947	H	Austria Wien	7-2	55,000	Ströll 10' 16' 22' 59', Binder 47' 66', Knor R. 85'
10	28.02.1948	A	Oberlaa	3-2	9,000	Ströll 19' 40' 47'
11	07.03.1948	H	Wacker Wien	0-1	57,000	
12	14.03.1948	A	Wiener SC	2-1	52,000	Körner A. 54', Knor R. 87'
13	04.04.1948	H	Vienna	2-1	16,000	Ströll 11', Gernhardt 77'
14	11.04.1948	A	FAC	2-2	12,000	Müller E. 12', Kaspirek 27'
15	25.04.1948	H	Wiener AC	4-0	7,000	Körner R. 2', Körner A. 17' 24', Schiff 79'
16	09.05.1948	A	Admira	6-0	18,000	Ströll 26' 76', Körner A. 38', Binder 40' 75' 83'
17	23.05.1948	H	FC Wien	0-2	10,000	
18	06.06.1948	A	Austria Wien	2-2	44,000	Knor R. 60', Körner R. 84' (pen.)

=== Cup ===
Rd	Date	Venue	Opponent	Res.	Att.	Goals and discipline
R1	16.11.1947	H	Gaswerk	11-5	4,000	Knor R. 6', Körner R. 14' 28', Körner A. 21' 51' 59', Lukas 25' 70', Binder 31' 42', Gernhardt 77'
R16	30.11.1947	H	Wiener AC	3-0	4,000	Körner A. 33' 89', Ströll 49'
QF	21.03.1948	H	Austria Wien	2-5	55,000	Ströll 44', Domnanich K. 70'
