= Skoumal =

Skoumal is a Czech surname. Notable people with the surname include:

- Adam Skoumal (born 1969), Czech composer
- Petr Skoumal (1938–2014), Czech musician and composer
- Stefan Skoumal (1909–1983), Austrian football midfielder
- Václav Skoumal (born 1944), Czech gymnast
