= 1944–45 Gauliga Donau-Alpenland =

Gauliga Donau-Alpenland
- Season: 1944–45
- Champions: not completed
- Relegated: none
- German championship: not held

The 1944–45 Gauliga Donau-Alpenland was the seventh and final season of the Gauliga Donau-Alpenland, formerly the Gauliga Ostmark, the first tier of football in German-annexed Austria from 1938 to 1945.

The 1944–45 edition was not completed and stopped after nine rounds. Nazi Germany surrendered on 8 May 1945 and, in the following season, an independent Austrian football championship was held again.

== Table ==
The 1944–45 season saw two new clubs in the league, SC Rapid Oberlaa and SK Admira Wien. As the league was being expanded for next season from 10 to 12 clubs, no relegation took place.

| Pos | Team | Pld | W | D | L | GF | GA | GD | Pts |
|---|---|---|---|---|---|---|---|---|---|
| 1 | SK Rapid Wien | 9 | 6 | 2 | 1 | 35 | 12 | +23 | 14 |
| 2 | SC Wacker Wien | 9 | 6 | 2 | 1 | 26 | 14 | +12 | 14 |
| 3 | First Vienna FC | 9 | 6 | 1 | 2 | 35 | 18 | +17 | 13 |
| 4 | FC Wien | 9 | 5 | 1 | 3 | 21 | 8 | +13 | 11 |
| 5 | Floridsdorfer AC | 9 | 5 | 1 | 3 | 18 | 13 | +5 | 11 |
| 6 | SK Admira Wien | 9 | 4 | 1 | 4 | 17 | 20 | −3 | 9 |
| 7 | Wiener Sportclub | 9 | 2 | 1 | 6 | 14 | 26 | −12 | 5 |
| 8 | Wiener AC | 9 | 2 | 1 | 6 | 16 | 34 | −18 | 5 |
| 9 | FK Austria Wien | 9 | 2 | 0 | 7 | 15 | 19 | −4 | 4 |
| 10 | SC Rapid Oberlaa | 9 | 1 | 0 | 8 | 8 | 41 | −33 | 2 |

Source: RSSSF.com
Rules for classification: 1) Points
- The fixture between Wiener Sportclub and SC Rapid Oberlaa was abandoned; this game was recorded as a 0-0 loss against both sides, which explains why there appear to be two more losses than victories.

== Results ==
| Home \ Away | ADW | AUS | FIR | FLO | OBE | RAP | WAK | WIE | WAC | SPO |
|---|---|---|---|---|---|---|---|---|---|---|
| SK Admira Wien | | 2–0 | | | 2–0 | | | | 3–2 | 3–2 |
| FK Austria Wien | | | | | 5–1 | | | | | |
| First Vienna | 5–3 | 6–1 | | 5–2 | 11–1 | | | 3–1 | 1–0 | 2–2 |
| Floridsdorfer AC | 2–1 | 1–0 | | | 3–1 | | | | 6–0 | 0–1 |
| Rapid Oberlaa | | | | | | | | | | |
| SK Rapid Wien | 2–2 | 3–1 | 5–0 | 3–1 | 7–1 | | 2–3 | 1–1 | 9–3 | 3–0 |
| SC Wacker | 4–1 | 2–1 | 3–2 | 2–2 | 1–2 | | | 1–0 | 2–2 | 8–2 |
| FC Wien | 3–0 | 1–0 | | 0–1 | 9–1 | | | | 3–1 | 3–0 |
| Wiener AC | | 0–5 | | | 3–1 | | | | | |
| Wiener Sportclub | | 3–2 | | | 0–3 (Note: The fixture between Wiener Sportclub and SC Rapid Oberlaa was abandoned; this game was recorded as a 0-0 loss against both sides.) | | 4–5 | | | |

Legend: Blue = home team win; Yellow = draw; Red = away team win.
