= Lukas Aurednik =

Austrian footballer and football manager (1918–1997)

Personal information
- Date of birth: 20 February 1918
- Place of birth: Vienna, Austria-Hungary
- Date of death: 2 June 1997 (aged 79)
- Positions: Striker; right-back

Youth career
- 1933–1935: SC Staatsfabrik Wien

Senior career*
Years	Team	Apps	(Gls)
1935–1938	Rapid Wien	34	(4)
1938–1940	TuS Neuendorf		
1940–1942	MSV Brno		
1942–1943	Rapid Vienna	3	(1)
1943–1944	LSV Markersdorf		
1944–1946	Rapid Wien	22	(28)
1946–1948	CO Roubaix-Tourcoing		
1948–1953	Austria Wien	108	(46)
1954–1956	Lens	29	(6)
1956–1958	Le Havre	60	(12)

International career
1948–1950	Austria	14	(2)

Managerial career
- 1959–1961: AEK Athens
- 1961–1962: Pierikos
- 1962–1963: Ethnikos Piraeus
- 1963–1965: Anorthosis Famagusta
- 1965–1967: Panetolikos
- 1967–1969: 1. Wiener Neustädter SC
- 1970–1971: Royal Charleroi
- * Club domestic league appearances and goals

Lukas "Harry" Aurednik (20 February 1918 – 2 June 1997) was an Austrian football player and manager. He made 14 appearances for the Austria national team, scoring 2 goals.

== Club career ==
Aurednik began his football career as a goalkeeper for the small club, Sportclub Staatsfabrik and was soon used as field player due to his footballing skills. Initially as a right wing-back, he transformed himself into a striker and received his first professional contract with Rapid Wien in 1935. In 1938, with the Hütteldorfers, he won the last championship in Austria before its annexation to the German Reich. From 1938 he played for several years at TuS Neuendorf and in the meantime briefly played at Spandauer SV, the lower-class club Rot-Weiß Iserlohn and at LSV Wolfenbüttel, before moving to MSV Brno was transferred to the Protectorate of Bohemia and Moravia. However, he played with the Brno team in the Gauliga Sudetenland, which he won with his club in 1943 and could therefore have played in the final round of the German championship. But after a short return to Rapid Wien, Aurednik was transferred to LSV Markersdorf in the same year and reached the "reception club for drafted football professionals", as the Wehrmacht club was also called, and the already players like Karl Durspekt, Karl Sesta, Max Merkel, Walter Dzur and Paul Zielinski, achieved sixth place in the East Mark Gauliga in the 1943–44 season.

In 1944, however, Aurednik was able to return to Rapid, where he stayed until 1946. With the green and whites he also became the first Austrian football champion and cup winner in post-war Austria in the 1945–46 season. As a left winger, he contributed 28 goals in 20 championship games and 7 goals in 3 cup games. In 1946 he finally went abroad in France and joined CO Roubaix-Tourcoing, where he was only able to play in the reserve team due to the lack of approval from the ÖFB, but was also involved in youth training. He returned to Austria in 1948 and, after his pardon, played for Austria Wien six months later. There, as a left winger in combination with his elegant connecting striker Ernst Stojaspal, he formed the best striker in the league and was quickly able to build on his old goalscoring qualities. With the Violets he won the Austrian championship title three times in 1949, 1950 and 1953 and also the cup competition in 1949.

Aurednik, who was nicknamed "the magician" by fans, became known primarily for his scissor jumps, which literally confused his opponents, and for the famous "railway worker insult" (pushing the ball back and forth with the sole of the foot). In terms of his stature, he was a lightweight, but technically highly gifted and extremely strong in sprinting. His speed also gave him his name “Harry”, which stuck to him after a game against an English team. Because of his strength, the British fans celebrated him with calls of "hurry, hurry", which then became – loosely translated in Viennese – "Harry".

After becoming player-manager at the lower-tier SC Austria Lustenau in 1953, Aurednik went to France again in 1954, where he initially played for Lens for two years and scored six goals in 29 appearances in the French Division 1 in his first season. In the 1955–56 season he and his team reached the runner-up position alongside Erich Habitzl, where he was used 15 times in the 34 game rounds. From 1956 to 1958 he was active in Division 2 at Le Havre and scored 12 goals in 60 championship games.

== International career ==
Aurednik played for Austria in 1948 when he was already 30 years old. The late-career Viennese made his debut for Austria in the game against Czechoslovakia on 31 October 1948 in Pressburg. In total, he played 14 international matches for the national team until 1950. After a game against the Scotland, he was left out of the squad and was no longer called up.

== Managerial career ==
=== AEK Athens ===
In 1959, with the creation of the unified Alpha Ethniki, he took over AEK Athens, which under his guidance tied with Panathinaikos in first place of the standings, losing the title in a play-off match 2–1 and thus finishing in second place. He started on the AEK bench the following season as well, only to be replaced as first manager in December 1960 by Tryfon Tzanetis, but remained in the coaching team alongside Tzanetis, and Ribas as an advisor.

=== Pierikos ===
In 1961, he took over as the manager of the newly-formed Pierikos. During his spell, Pierikos in a total of 37 games managed 26 wins, 7 draws and 4 losses, with a total of 116 goals for and 22 against. The away defeat at the hands of Iraklis Kavala on 3 June 1962, resulted in the loss of a direct promotion to the first division was blamed on Aurednik and caused the termination of his contract and his replacement by Kleanthis Vikelidis.

=== Ethnikos Piraeus ===
Afterwards, Aurednik became the manager of Ethnikos Piraeus, where he remained for about a year. His son, Jürgen was a footballer of the team, recording three appearances and a goal, which he scored in the 3–2 defeat from PAOK at Toumba Stadium on 23 December 1962.

=== Anorthosis Famagusta ===
From 1963 to 1965 Auretnik was in Cyprus as the manager of Anorthosis Famagusta, where he won the 1964 Cup, as well as the Cypriot Super Cup at the start of the following season.

=== Panaitolikos ===
After his spell at Cyprus, Aurednik returned to Greece and took over Panetolikos from 1965 to 1967, which was his last Greek club he coached.

=== Wiener Neustetter ===
The continuation of his career found him again in Cyprus, from where at the end of 1967 he returned to his homeland and took over as the manager of 1. Wiener Neustädter SC, replacing Karl Kohler. With him at the wheel, the team recorded a mediocre run in the 1967–68 season, while making a very poor start the following season, which led to his sacking after the end of the first round in early 1969.

=== Charleroi ===
In the spring of 1970 he took charge of Charleroi in Belgium, remaining on their bench until 1971, the marked the end of his managerial career.

== Death ==
Auretnik died on 2 June 1997 at the age of 79.

== Honours ==
=== As a player ===
Rapid Wien

- Austrian Football Bundesliga: 1937–38, 1945–46
- Tschammer-Pokal: 1938

Austria Wien

- Austrian Football Bundesliga: 1948–49, 1949–50, 1952–53
- Austrian Cup: 1948–49

=== As a manager ===
Anorthosis Famagusta

- Cypriot Cup: 1963–64
- Cypriot Super Cup: 1964
