= 1934–35 Austrian football championship =

24th season of top-tier football league in Austria

Austrian football championship
- Season: 1934-35

Statistics of Austrian first league in the 1934–35 season.

== Overview ==
It was contested by 12 teams, and SK Rapid Wien won the championship.

== League standings ==
| Pos | Team | Pld | W | D | L | GF | GA | GD | Pts |
|---|---|---|---|---|---|---|---|---|---|
| 1 | SK Rapid Wien | 22 | 18 | 4 | 0 | 95 | 30 | +65 | 40 |
| 2 | SK Admira Wien | 22 | 15 | 4 | 3 | 74 | 27 | +47 | 34 |
| 3 | First Vienna FC | 22 | 11 | 5 | 6 | 36 | 25 | +11 | 27 |
| 4 | SC Wacker | 22 | 8 | 6 | 8 | 48 | 55 | −7 | 22 |
| 5 | SC Libertas | 22 | 6 | 8 | 8 | 43 | 45 | −2 | 20 |
| 6 | Wiener Sportclub | 22 | 8 | 4 | 10 | 33 | 40 | −7 | 20 |
| 7 | Floridsdorfer AC | 22 | 7 | 6 | 9 | 41 | 53 | −12 | 20 |
| 8 | FK Austria Wien | 22 | 8 | 2 | 12 | 36 | 48 | −12 | 18 |
| 9 | FC Wien | 22 | 4 | 9 | 9 | 33 | 44 | −11 | 17 |
| 10 | Hakoah Vienna | 22 | 6 | 5 | 11 | 37 | 60 | −23 | 17 |
| 11 | Wiener AC | 22 | 5 | 6 | 11 | 36 | 57 | −21 | 16 |
| 12 | Favoritner SC | 22 | 4 | 5 | 13 | 25 | 53 | −28 | 13 |

Source: rsssf.com

== Results ==
| Home \ Away | ADM | AUS | FAV | FIR | FLO | HAK | LIB | RAP | WAK | WIE | WAC | SPO |
|---|---|---|---|---|---|---|---|---|---|---|---|---|
| SK Admira Wien | | 1–2 | 2–1 | 2–4 | 1–1 | 4–1 | 2–1 | 1–1 | 5–0 | 3–2 | 3–3 | 4–1 |
| FK Austria Wien | 0–7 | | 0–2 | 0–2 | 1–3 | 2–1 | 2–4 | 1–3 | 1–2 | 1–0 | 1–1 | 3–0 |
| Favoritner SC | 1–5 | 2–4 | | 0–1 | 1–6 | 1–1 | 1–3 | 1–4 | 0–3 | 1–0 | 2–1 | 0–0 |
| First Vienna | 0–1 | 3–1 | 2–2 | | 4–1 | 2–5 | 3–2 | 1–1 | 1–0 | 0–2 | 2–0 | 0–1 |
| Floridsdorfer AC | 0–1 | 2–1 | 4–1 | 1–4 | | 2–3 | 2–2 | 1–8 | 3–3 | 1–3 | 2–1 | 1–0 |
| Hakoah Vienna | 1–5 | 2–5 | 1–0 | 0–0 | 1–1 | | 2–2 | 1–8 | 3–4 | 3–3 | 2–1 | 3–1 |
| SC Libertas | 3–3 | 3–4 | 4–2 | 2–0 | 1–1 | 4–0 | | 1–7 | 2–3 | 1–1 | 0–2 | 1–0 |
| SK Rapid Wien | 3–2 | 5–2 | 7–1 | 0–0 | 3–0 | 5–1 | 3–1 | | 7–5 | 2–0 | 4–2 | 5–2 |
| SC Wacker | 1–8 | 2–4 | 2–2 | 2–2 | 8–4 | 4–0 | 1–1 | 0–2 | | 0–4 | 3–0 | 2–1 |
| FC Wien | 0–4 | 1–1 | 1–1 | 1–3 | 1–1 | 0–4 | 1–1 | 3–3 | 2–2 | | 4–3 | 1–4 |
| Wiener AC | 1–4 | 1–0 | 2–1 | 0–2 | 2–4 | 3–1 | 3–2 | 2–11 | 2–2 | 1–1 | | 1–1 |
| Wiener Sportclub | 0–6 | 1–0 | 0–2 | 1–0 | 3–0 | 3–1 | 2–2 | 2–3 | 3–0 | 4–2 | 3–3 | |

Legend: Blue = home team win; Yellow = draw; Red = away team win.
