= Josef Adelbrecht =

Austrian footballer

Personal information
- Date of birth: 10 January 1910
- Date of death: 1 October 1941 (aged 31)
- Position: Forward

Senior career*
Years	Team	Apps	(Gls)
1928–1934	First Vienna		
1934–1935	RCF Paris		
1935	Grasshopper Club Zürich		
1936–1937	Austria Wien		
1937–1938	Rapid Wien	5	(3)
1938	SC Austro Fiat Wien		
1939	SC Red Star Wien		
1941	Floridsdorfer AC		

International career
1930–1933	Austria	3	(1)
- * Club domestic league appearances and goals

Josef Adelbrecht (10 January 1910 – 1 October 1941) was an Austrian footballer who played as a forward.

== Club career ==
Adelbrecht started his career with First Vienna in 1928 with whom he won the Mitropa Cup in 1931. In 1934 he moved to play professionally in France only to return after two years to play for Austria Wien and Rapid Wien .

== International career ==
He made his debut for Austria in June 1930 against Hungary and played two more internationals, scoring one goal.

== World War II and death ==
Adelbrecht was drafted into the Wehrmacht in March 1940 and served in the 235th Infantry Regiment. He was killed in the German invasion of Russia at Ivashkovo, about 100 km northwest of Moscow.

== Honours ==
- Austrian Football Bundesliga: 1931, 1933, 1938
- Austrian Cup: 1929, 1930
- Mitropa Cup: 1931
