= 1938 Tschammerpokal =

Tournament details
- Country: Germany
- Teams: 72

Final positions
- Champions: Rapid Wien (1st title)
- Runners-up: FSV Frankfurt

Tournament statistics
- Matches played: 70

The 1938 Tschammerpokal was the 4th season of the annual German football cup competition. For the first time, Austrian teams competed in the competition due to the Anschluss by Nazi Germany at the beginning of the year. In the final, which was held on 8 January 1939 at the Olympiastadion in Berlin, Austrian club Rapid Wien defeated FSV Frankfurt 3–1.

== Matches ==
=== First round ===
27 August 1938
Stettiner SC	1 – 1	Yorck-Boyen Insterburg	(AET)
28 August 1938
VfB Peine	2 – 1	Hamburger SV	(AET)
WKG BSG Neumeyer Nürnberg	4 – 2	Stuttgarter Kickers
CSC 03 Kassel	0 – 1	FSV Frankfurt
BC Hartha	4 – 1	Sportfreunde Klausberg
SV Polizei Lübeck	2 – 4	Fortuna Düsseldorf
SC Opel Rüsselsheim	2 – 1	Alemannia Aachen
Brandenburger SC Süd 05	3 – 0	MTV Pommerensdorf
Polizei SV Berlin	2 – 3	Vorwärts-Rasensport Gleiwitz
SV Dessau 05	2 – 1	SV BEWAG Berlin
Rot-Weiss Essen	5 – 1	FC St. Pauli
SpVgg Röhlinghausen	1 – 2	Werder Bremen
1. SV Jena	1 – 2	Hertha BSC
SV Waldhof Mannheim	4 – 0	Borussia Fulda
SSV Velbert	1 – 3	Grün-Weiß Eschweiler
Westfalia Herne	5 – 1	Sportfreunde Katernberg
SC Victoria Hamburg	4 – 3	FC Schalke 04
Eintracht Frankfurt	1 – 2	TSV 1860 München
Freiburger FC	3 – 1	Hannover 96
Preußen Greppin	0 – 13	Dresdner SC
Beuthener SuSV 09	3 – 2	Berliner SV 92
SV Klein-Steinheim	2 – 3	1. FC Nürnberg	(AET)
1. SSV Ulm 1928	3 – 2	SpVgg Fürth
SC Blau-Weiß Köln 06	1 – 7	VfR Mannheim
FC Bayern Munich	7 – 0	Union Böckingen
Borussia Dortmund	1 – 2	Phönix Lübeck
Arminia Bielefeld	5 – 1	Holstein Kiel
Blau-Weiß 90 Berlin	5 – 1	TSV 1861 Swinemünde
Riesaer SV	2 – 1	Wacker 04 Tegel
SV Hindenburg Allenstein	2 – 0	Preußen Danzig
11 September 1938
VfB Stuttgart	7 – 1	Karlsruher FC Phönix
FC Hanau 93	0 – 4	VfB Mühlburg

==== Replay ====
Yorck-Boyen Insterburg	concession	Stettiner SC

=== Second round ===
11 September 1938
FSV Frankfurt	3 – 1	BC Hartha
Fortuna Düsseldorf	7 – 1	Opel Rüsselsheim
Vorwärts-Rasensport Gleiwitz	2 – 1	SV Dessau 05
Werder Bremen	2 – 3	Rot-Weiss Essen
Grün-Weiß Eschweiler	1 – 2	SV Waldhof Mannheim
Westfalia Herne	5 – 1	SC Victoria Hamburg
TSV 1860 München	3 – 1	Freiburger FC
Dresdner SC	10 – 1	Beuthener SuSV 09
VfR Mannheim	2 – 1	FC Bayern Munich
Phönix Lübeck	3 – 2	Arminia Bielefeld
18 September 1938
1. FC Nürnberg	2 – 1	1. SSV Ulm 1928
VfB Stuttgart	2 – 1	WKG BSG Neumeyer Nürnberg
VfB Mühlburg	6 – 1	VfB Peine
25 September 1938
Blau-Weiß 90 Berlin	3 – 1	Riesaer SV
Yorck-Boyen Insterburg	1 – 4	Brandenburger SC 05
Hertha BSC	concession	SV Hindenburg Allenstein

=== Round of 16 ===
9 October 1938
FSV Frankfurt	3 – 1	Fortuna Düsseldorf
SV Waldhof Mannheim	6 – 0	Westfalia Herne
VfB Mühlburg	2 – 1	VfB Stuttgart
TSV 1860 Munich	3 – 0	Dresdner SC
Brandenburger SC Süd 05	0 – 1	Vorwärts-Rasensport Gleiwitz
1. FC Nürnberg	1 – 0	VfR Mannheim
Rot-Weiß Essen	3 – 0	Hertha BSC
Blau-Weiß 90 Berlin	1 – 0	1. FC Phönix Lübeck

=== Quarter-finals ===
In the quarter-finals, the eight German teams (Altreich) were paired internally in an elimination round. The eight teams from Austria (now called Ostmark due to the Anschluss) were also paired in an internal elimination round. The winners then met in a joint quarter-final round. The pairings were entirely random.

==== Altreich elimination ====
6 November 1938
SV Waldhof Mannheim	3 – 2	Rot-Weiß Essen	(AET)
Blau-Weiß 90 Berlin	1 – 2	TSV 1860 München
FSV Frankfurt	3 – 1	VfB Mühlburg
Vorwärts-Rasensport Gleiwitz	2 – 4	1. FC Nürnberg

==== Ostmark elimination ====
6 November 1938
Vienna Wien	6 – 0	SK Admira Wien
SK Rapid Wien	5 – 1	SC Austro Fiat Wien
Wiener Sport-Club	1 – 0	SC Wacker Wien
Grazer SC	3 – 2	Austria Wien

==== Joint quarter-finals ====
27 November 1938
1. FC Nürnberg	3 – 1	Vienna Wien
SV Waldhof Mannheim	2 – 3	SK Rapid Wien
TSV 1860 München	1 – 2	FSV Frankfurt	(AET)
Wiener Sport-Club	6 – 1	Grazer SC

=== Semi-finals ===
11 December 1938
SK Rapid Wien	2 – 0	1. FC Nürnberg
FSV Frankfurt	3 – 2	Wiener Sport-Club

=== Final ===
8 January 1939

FSV Frankfurt	1–3	Rapid Wien
Dosedzal 17'	Report	Schors 80'; Hofstätter 85'; Binder 90'

Olympiastadion, Berlin
Attendance: 40,000
Referee: Fritz Rühle (Merseburg)
