= 1940–41 Gauliga Ostmark =

Gauliga Ostmark
- Season: 1940–41
- Champions: SK Rapid Wien
- Relegated: Grazer SC Linzer ASK
- German championship: SK Rapid Wien

The 1940–41 Gauliga Ostmark was the third season of the Gauliga Ostmark, the first tier of football in German-annexed Austria from 1938 to 1945, officially referred to as Ostmark.

SK Rapid Wien won the championship and qualified for the 1941 German football championship which it won by defeating FC Schalke 04 4–3 in the final.

The Gauliga Ostmark and Gauliga Donau-Alpenland titles from 1938 to 1944, excluding the 1944–45 season which was not completed, are recognised as official Austrian football championships by the Austrian Bundesliga.

== Table ==
The 1940–41 season saw three new clubs in the league, Floridsdorfer AC, Grazer SC and Linzer ASK. Compare to the previous season the league had seen an expansion from eight to ten teams.

Pos	Team	Pld	W	D	L	GF	GA	GD	Pts	Promotion, qualification or relegation
1	SK Rapid Wien (C)	18	12	4	2	82	29	+53	28	Qualification to German championship
2	SC Wacker Wien	18	10	4	4	60	33	+27	24	
3	First Vienna FC	18	11	2	5	52	33	+19	24	
4	FK Austria Wien	18	10	2	6	56	22	+34	22	
5	SK Admira Wien	18	8	5	5	56	46	+10	21	
6	Wiener Sportclub	18	7	4	7	47	37	+10	18	
7	FC Wien	18	6	5	7	32	40	−8	17	
8	Floridsdorfer AC	18	7	3	8	40	60	−20	17	
9	Grazer SC (R)	18	4	1	13	26	62	−36	9	Relegation
10	Linzer ASK (R)	18	0	0	18	17	106	−89	0	Relegation

Source: RSSSF.com
Rules for classification: 1) Points
(C) Champions; (R) Relegated

== Results ==
Home \ Away	ADM	AUS	FIR	FLO	GRA	LIN	RAP	WAK	WIE	SPO
SK Admira Wien		4–1	5–2	3–3	8–1	6–2	0–3	1–4	1–1	6–4
FK Austria Wien	2–0		0–0	1–2	3–1	21–0	0–3	4–0	1–0	3–0
First Vienna FC	3–2	3–1		4–0	4–1	8–1	1–1	3–6	1–3	3–2
Floridsdorfer AC	3–3	4–2	0–8			6–3	0–7	5–2	3–1	0–2
Grazer SC	1–4	0–3	0–4	5–2			3–4	1–2	0–2	2–1
Linzer ASK	0–1	1–4		0–3	3–6		0–9	1–9	3–3	2–6
SK Rapid Wien	6–1	1–0	7–0	5–4	11–1	11–3		1–1	5–5	2–3
SC Wacker	3–3	2–2	0–1	7–1	5–3	9–1	2–3		2–1	1–0
FC Wien	4–5	1–2	1–7	3–3	1–1		3–1	1–4		2–1
Wiener Sportclub	3–3	0–6	3–0	4–1	5–0	7–0	2–2	1–1	3–3	

Legend: Blue = home team win; Yellow = draw; Red = away team win.
