= Walter Probst =

Austrian footballer and manager

Personal information
- Date of birth: 17 April 1918
- Place of birth: Austria
- Date of death: February 2007
- Position: Striker

Senior career*
Years	Team	Apps	(Gls)
1935–1938	Rapid Wien	27	(10)
1938–1939	Wacker München		
1939–1948	Austria Wien		
1948–1949	Hakoah Vienna		
1949–1952	Sportclub		

Managerial career
- 1954–1959: IFK Göteborg
- 1959–1960: Austria Wien
- 1960–1963: Djurgårdens IF
- 1964–1965: Örgryte IS
- SAAB Linköping
- * Club domestic league appearances and goals

Walter Probst (17 April 1918 – February 2007) was an Austrian football player and manager.

He played for Rapid Wien, Wacker München, Austria Wien, Hakoah and Sportclub .

He coached IFK Göteborg, Austria Wien, Djurgårdens IF, Örgryte IS and SAAB Linköping.
