= 1947–48 Austrian football championship =

30th season of top-tier football league in Austria

Austrian football championship
- Season: 1947–48

Statistics of Austrian league in the 1947–48 season.

== Overview ==
It was contested by 10 teams, and SK Rapid Wien won the championship.

== League standings ==
Pos	Team	Pld	W	D	L	GF	GA	GD	Pts
1	SK Rapid Wien	18	13	2	3	55	23	+32	28
2	SC Wacker	18	13	1	4	60	19	+41	27
3	FK Austria Wien	18	9	4	5	74	36	+38	22
4	Wiener Sportclub	18	9	3	6	36	29	+7	21
5	FC Wien	18	9	3	6	33	28	+5	21
6	SK Admira Wien	18	7	5	6	26	36	−10	19
7	First Vienna FC	18	8	2	8	47	46	+1	18
8	SC Rapid Oberlaa	18	4	2	12	20	57	−37	10
9	Floridsdorfer AC	18	3	3	12	21	47	−26	9
10	Wiener AC	18	2	1	15	17	68	−51	5

Source: rsssf.com

== Results ==
Home \ Away	ADM	AWI	FIR	FLO	FCW	RWI	ROB	WAK	WAC	WIE
Admira Wien		0–9	2–0	2–0	1–1	0–6	1–1	0–4	2–3	1–3
Austria Wien	1–2		6–6	6–3	7–0	2–2	10–1	1–3	8–2	3–0
First Vienna	4–0	4–3		4–1	2–3	3–4	3–2	0–6	4–0	5–1
Floridsdorfer AC	2–2	1–3	1–2		1–4	2–2	0–1	1–3	1–2	2–1
FC Wien	1–0	1–1	4–0	2–3		0–1	3–0	1–3	3–1	1–3
Rapid Wien	1–2	7–2	2–1	5–0	0–2		6–3	0–1	4–0	1–0
Rapid Oberlaa	0–5	2–1	0–7	0–0	0–2	2–3		0–1	1–0	2–3
Wacker Wien	2–2	0–2	7–0	5–1	0–1	2–4	7–1		10–1	1–0
Wiener AC	1–2	0–7	1–4	1–2	1–1	0–5	2–3	1–4		1–5
Wiener SC	1–1	2–2	2–2	2–0	4–3	1–2	3–1	3–1	2–0	

Legend: Blue = home team win; Yellow = draw; Red = away team win.
