= 1948–49 Austrian football championship =

31st season of top-tier football league in Austria

Austrian football championship
- Season: 1948–49

Statistics of Austrian league in the 1948–49 season.

== Overview ==
It was contested by 10 teams, and FK Austria Wien won the championship.

== League standings ==
Pos	Team	Pld	W	D	L	GF	GA	GD	Pts
1	FK Austria Wien	18	13	1	4	65	27	+38	27
2	SK Rapid Wien	18	11	3	4	61	29	+32	25
3	SK Admira Wien	18	11	2	5	69	33	+36	24
4	SC Wacker	18	10	3	5	35	34	+1	23
5	FC Wien	18	9	3	6	35	33	+2	21
6	First Vienna FC	18	8	3	7	44	32	+12	19
7	Wiener Sportclub	18	8	3	7	35	34	+1	19
8	Floridsdorfer AC	18	6	2	10	37	46	−9	14
9	SC Rapid Oberlaa	18	1	2	15	16	64	−48	4
10	SCR Hochstädt	18	1	2	15	14	79	−65	4

Source: rsssf.com

== Results ==
Home \ Away	ADM	AWI	FIR	FLO	FCW	HOC	ROB	RWI	WAK	WIE
Admira Wien		1–5	3–2	8–4	3–1	5–1	9–0	3–2	1–2	8–1
Austria Wien	1–1		6–2	1–0	2–1	10–2	4–0	5–3	0–1	3–2
First Vienna	1–1	2–1		2–1	1–2	7–0	4–2	5–1	1–2	2–4
Floridsdorfer AC	2–3	2–4	2–3		4–0	2–0	2–0	2–8	4–1	4–3
FC Wien	3–2	3–0	3–3	2–2		2–0	6–0	1–6	1–1	3–1
Hochstädt	0–8	2–9	0–4	0–2	0–1		3–2	2–2	0–3	0–2
Rapid Oberlaa	1–7	0–2	0–3	2–1	0–2	3–3		1–5	0–2	1–2
Rapid Wien	4–1	1–2	2–1	2–0	5–1	9–1	4–0		1–1	1–1
Wacker Wien	3–1	3–10	1–0	3–3	0–3	4–0	4–3	1–2		0–2
Wiener SC	0–4	1–0	1–1	4–0	3–0	4–0	1–1	1–3	2–3	

Legend: Blue = home team win; Yellow = draw; Red = away team win.
