= Karl Czerny =

Austrian football player and referee

Personal information
- Date of birth: 4 December 1896
- Place of birth: Vienna, Austria-Hungary
- Date of death: 25 November 1974 (aged 77)
- Place of death: Vienna, Austria
- Position: Midfielder

Senior career*
Years	Team	Apps	(Gls)
1916–1919	SK Rapid Wien	12	(0)
1919–1920	Wiener Sportclub	9	(1)
1920–1922	DFC Prag		
1922–1925	Kapfenberger SV		
- * Club domestic league appearances and goals

Karl Czerny (4 December 1896 – 25 November 1974) was an Austrian professional football player, who played as a midfielder and worked as a referee for many years after his active career. He played for SK Rapid Wien, Wiener Sportclub, DFC Prag and Kapfenberger SV.
