= Seppl-Herberger-Stadion =

Football stadium in Mannheim, Germany

Coordinates: 49°31′59″N 8°29′7″E

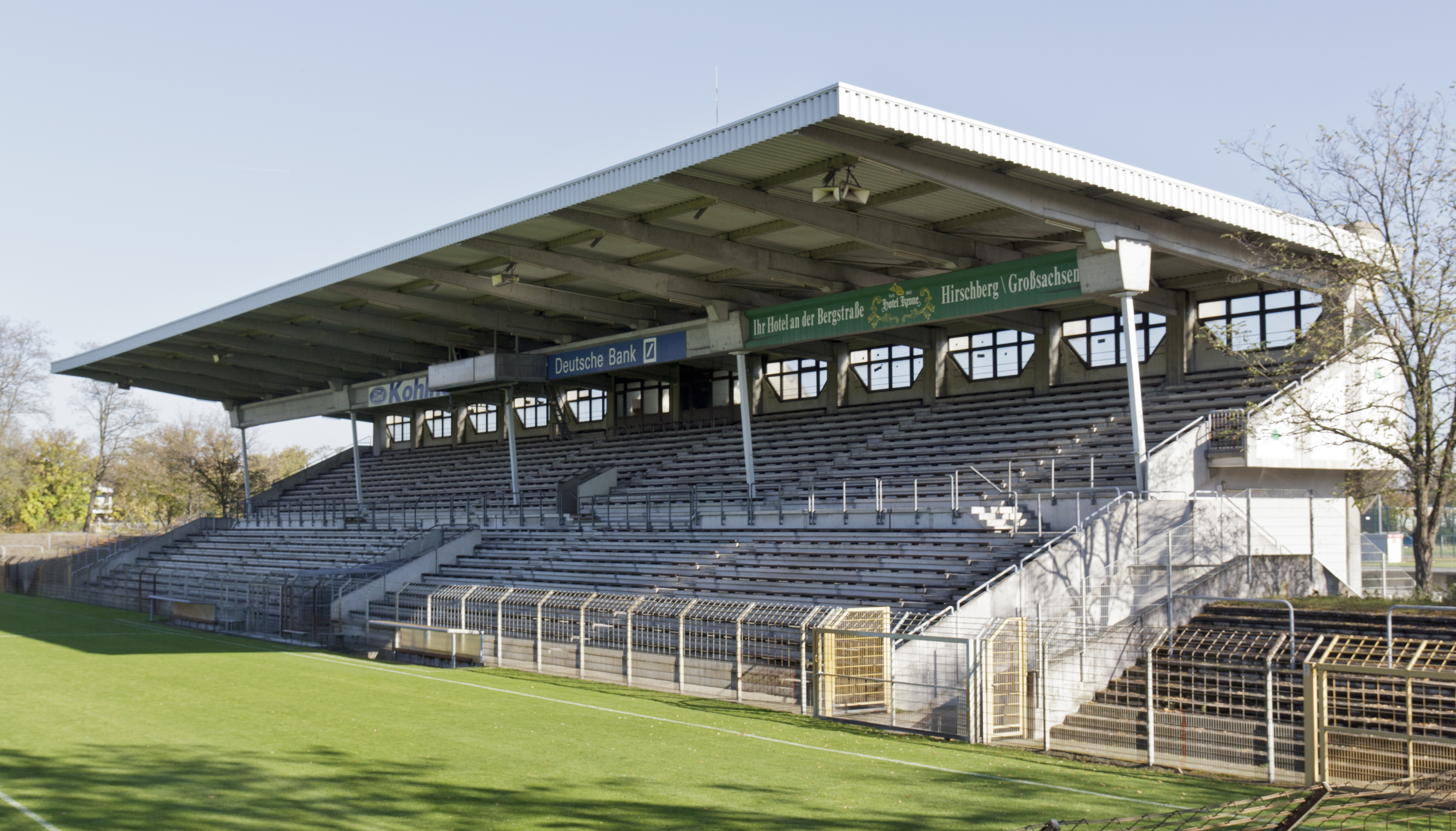
- Interactive map of Seppl-Herberger-Stadion
- Full name: Seppl-Herberger-Stadion
- Location: Mannheim, Germany
- Owner: SV Waldhof Mannheim
- Operator: SV Waldhof Mannheim
- Capacity: 15,200

Construction
- Opened: 1924

Tenant
- SV Waldhof Mannheim

Seppl-Herberger-Stadion is a multi-use stadium in Mannheim, Germany. It was initially used as the stadium of SV Waldhof Mannheim matches. It was replaced by Carl-Benz-Stadion in 1994. The capacity of the stadium is 15,200. In 1996, the stadium was renamed from Stadion am Alsenweg to its current name after German coach Sepp Herberger, who saved the lives of several of his players during World War II. The stadium was also partially destroyed during the war, and then rebuilt in 1954. In August 2024, the stadium hosted the tug of war world championships. the stadium is now used as the stadium of SV Waldhof's reserve team, SV Waldhof Mannheim II.
