= 1936–37 Austrian football championship =

26th season of top-tier football league in Austria

Austrian football championship
- Season: 1936–37

Statistics of Austrian first league in the 1936–37 season.

== Overview ==
It was contested by 12 teams, and SK Admira Wien won the championship.

== League standings ==
Pos	Team	Pld	W	D	L	GF	GA	GD	Pts
1	SK Admira Wien	22	14	7	1	77	20	+57	35
2	FK Austria Wien	22	16	3	3	56	22	+34	35
3	First Vienna FC	22	12	6	4	46	26	+20	30
4	SC Wacker	22	11	2	9	46	41	+5	24
5	SK Rapid Wien	22	7	7	8	51	40	+11	21
6	Floridsdorfer AC	22	9	3	10	43	50	−7	21
7	Wiener Sportclub	22	8	5	9	31	39	−8	21
8	Favoritner AC	22	10	1	11	29	56	−27	21
9	FC Wien	22	7	6	9	29	40	−11	20
10	SC Libertas	22	4	7	11	32	46	−14	15
11	Post SV	22	5	5	12	25	44	−19	15
12	Hakoah Vienna	22	1	4	17	19	60	−41	6

Source: rsssf.com

== Results ==
Home \ Away	ADM	AUS	FAV	FIR	FLO	HAK	LIB	POS	RAP	WIE	WAK	SPO
SK Admira Wien		1–1	10–1	2–2	7–2	6–0	1–0	1–1	0–0	5–1	3–3	4–0
FK Austria Wien	4–2		7–1	1–1	2–0	3–2	4–0	2–1	5–0	3–0	4–1	3–0
Favoritner AC	0–6	2–1		0–3	4–3	0–3	4–2	0–1	2–0	3–1	2–0	0–1
First Vienna	0–3	1–2	2–0		2–0	6–0	1–0	4–2	2–2	2–1	1–3	3–0
Floridsdorfer AC	0–6	0–1	2–1	2–2		5–1	3–1	1–2	2–1	2–1	2–4	5–0
Hakoah Vienna	0–2	1–3	0–1	1–1	3–3		0–0	1–2	0–2	0–1	1–5	0–1
SC Libertas	1–3	0–3	2–2	1–3	2–2	4–2		1–1	1–0	5–2	1–3	4–0
Post SV	0–7	0–1	1–2	1–2	0–2	1–0	1–1		2–2	0–1	3–2	2–2
SK Rapid Wien	3–3	1–1	6–0	2–4	1–2	5–1	5–3	6–2		5–0	6–1	2–2
FC Wien	1–1	2–0	4–0	1–1	0–2	0–0	2–2	2–1	3–1		2–2	2–2
SC Wacker	0–1	3–4	1–2	2–1	4–3	3–1	3–0	1–0	3–0	1–2		0–2
Wiener Sportclub	0–3	3–1	0–2	0–2	5–0	6–2	1–1	3–1	1–1	2–0	0–1	

Legend: Blue = home team win; Yellow = draw; Red = away team win.
