= Franz Binder =

Austrian footballer and coach (1911–1989)

Personal information
- Date of birth: 1 December 1911
- Place of birth: St. Pölten, Austria-Hungary
- Date of death: 24 April 1989 (aged 77)
- Place of death: Vienna, Austria
- Height: 1.90 m (6 ft 3 in)
- Position: Forward

Senior career*
Years	Team	Apps	(Gls)
1927–1930	Sturm 19 St. Pölten	2	(5)
1930–1949	Rapid Wien	261	(297)
Total		263	(302)

International career
1933–1947	Austria	19	(16)
1939–1941	Germany	9	(10)

Managerial career
- 1949–1951: Rapid Wien
- 1952–1954: Jahn Regensburg
- 1954–1955: 1. FC Nürnberg
- 1960–1962: PSV Eindhoven
- 1962–1966: Rapid Wien
- 1969: SW Bregenz
- 1969–1970: 1860 Munich
- 1975–1976: Rapid Wien
- FC Kufstein
- * Club domestic league appearances and goals

Franz "Bimbo" Binder (1 December 1911 – 24 April 1989) was an Austrian football player and coach who played as a centre forward. Internationally he represented the Austria national team and, during the Anschluss, the Germany national team. He played internationally immediately following the Austrian "Wunderteam" of 1931–32.

He is the all time leading scorer of Rapid Wien with 1006 goals in 757 games and regarded as one of the greatest Austrian players of all time. In his whole career he would score 1202 goals in 831 matches. With an average-score of 1.44 goals per match, he is among the most prolific scorers in football history. Binder is one of only a few players to score more than 1200 goals in his professional career alongside Lajos Tichy, Josef Bican, Gerd Müller, Ferenc Puskás, Ferenc Deák, Erwin Helmchen and Pelé.

== Club career ==
Binder came from a family of labourers. He had nine siblings. When he was 15 years old he played football for the first team of Sturm 19 St. Pölten. Nicknamed Bimbo, Binder was a prolific goalscorer who played for SK Rapid Wien. He won the national Austrian championship four times and was three times top goalscorer in the Austrian league. In 1941 he also won the German championship with a 4–3 victory against Schalke 04, where he scored three goals. From 1930 to 1937, Binder scored more than 700 goals for Rapid Wien, including the reserves;

- 1930 − First team − 3 goals in 2 games. Reserve team − 14 goals in 9 games. Total − 17 games 11 goals.
- 1931 − First team − 19 goals in 14 games. Reserve team 54 goals in 23 games. Total − 73 goals 37 games.
- 1932 − First team − 62 goals in 48 games. Reserve team − 41 goals in 12 games. Total − 103 goals in 60 games.
- 1933 − First team − 104 goals in 68 games.
- 1934 − First team − 93 goals in 56 games.
- 1935 – First team − 95 goals in 58 games.
- 1936 − First team − 93 goals in 61 games.
- 1937 − First team − 122 goals in 72 games.
- Total Reserve − 109 goals in 44 games.
- Total First team − 591 goals in 378 games.
- Total Rapid Wien, 1930−1937 − 700 goals in 422 games with a ratio of 1.65 goals per game.

== International career ==
Binder was a very prolific goal scorer for both club and country, scoring 16 goals in 19 international matches for Austria, and later 10 goals in just 9 matches for Germany. He made his international debut on 11 June 1933 in a friendly against Belgium, scoring twice in a 4-1 win. In 1934, he scored a goal against both Italy and Czechoslovakia, the 1934 World Cup champions and runner-ups respectively. In January 1936, he scored a goal against both Iberian teams, Spain and Portugal, in 5-4 and 3-2 wins respectively. In 1937, he scored winners against France and Latvia (both 2-1 victories), with the latter being the most important as it assured Austria a ticket to the 1938 World Cup.

His debut with Germany was remarkably similar to Austria's, as he scored against Belgium in a 4-1 win again. He then scored two back-to-back hat-tricks against Bohemia and Moravia and the then World Champions Italy, with the former salvaging his side a 4-4 draw while the latter helped to a 5-2 win. In the following year he scored two more goals against Italy in a 3-2 win at the San Siro, which were the last he scored for Germany. After an 8-year hiatus, he returned to an Austria line-up in 1945, and despite being in his late 30s he still managed to score a further 5 goals for Austria before retiring from international football.

== Managerial career ==
After retirement from playing he became a football coach, of teams such as Jahn Regensburg, PSV Eindhoven, 1. FC Nürnberg, 1860 Munich and Rapid Wien.

== Career statistics ==
=== Club ===
Appearances and goals by club, season and competition
Club	Season	Austrian First League		German football championship		National cup		Mitropa Cup		Total	
Club	Season	Apps	Goals	Apps	Goals	Apps	Goals	Apps	Goals	Apps	Goals
Rapid Wien	1930–31	1	2	0	0	2	0	0	0	3	2
Rapid Wien	1931–32	8	6	0	0	2	6	0	0	10	12
Rapid Wien	1932–33	20	25	0	0	2	7	0	0	22	32
Rapid Wien	1933–34	22	20	0	0	5	7	4	6	31	33
Rapid Wien	1934–35	21	21	0	0	6	13	2	1	29	35
Rapid Wien	1935–36	20	17	0	0	2	4	2	3	24	24
Rapid Wien	1936–37	22	29	0	0	4	8	0	0	26	37
Rapid Wien	1937–38	17	22	0	0	1	0	0	0	18	22
Rapid Wien	1938–39	17	27	0	0	4	4	0	0	21	31
Rapid Wien	1939–40	13	18	9	14	7	18	0	0	29	50
Rapid Wien	1940–41	18	27	8	11	5	6	0	0	31	44
Rapid Wien	1941–42	8	6	0	0	2	5	0	0	10	11
Rapid Wien	1942–43	1	1	0	0	0	0	0	0	1	1
Rapid Wien	1943–44	2	4	0	0	0	0	0	0	2	4
Rapid Wien	1944–45	0	0	0	0	1	0	0	0	1	0
Rapid Wien	1945–46	13	17	0	0	3	7	0	0	16	24
Rapid Wien	1946–47	15	12	0	0	2	4	0	0	17	16
Rapid Wien	1947–48	17	11	0	0	3	2	0	0	20	13
Rapid Wien	1948–49	6	2	0	0	1	2	0	0	7	4
Rapid Wien	Total	241	267	17	25	52	93	8	10	318	395

=== International ===
Scores and results list Austria's and Germany's goal tally first, score column indicates score after each Binder goal.

List of international goals scored by Franz Binder
No.	Date	Venue	Opponent	Score	Result	Competition
Austria goals
1	11 June 1933	Praterstadion, Vienna, Austria	Belgium	2–1	4–1	Friendly
2	11 June 1933	Praterstadion, Vienna, Austria	Belgium	4–1	4–1	Friendly
3	11 February 1934	Stadio Municipale Benito Mussolini, Turin, Italy	Italy	3–0	4–2	1933–35 Central European International Cup
4	23 September 1934	Praterstadion, Vienna, Austria	Czechoslovakia	1–0	2–2	1933–35 Central European International Cup
5	19 January 1936	Estadio Metropolitano, Madrid, Spain	Spain	2–2	5–4	Friendly
6	26 January 1936	Estádio do Lima, Porto, Portugal	Portugal	2–0	3–2	Friendly
7	27 September 1936	Üllői úti stadion, Budapest, Hungary	Hungary	1–0	3–5	1936–38 Central European International Cup
8	8 November 1936	Hardturm, Zürich, Switzerland	Switzerland	1–0	3–1	1936–38 Central European International Cup
9	8 November 1936	Hardturm, Zürich, Switzerland	Switzerland	3–0	3–1	1936–38 Central European International Cup
10	24 January 1937	Parc des Princes, Paris, France	France	2–1	2–1	Friendly
11	5 October 1937	Praterstadion, Vienna, Austria	Latvia	2–1	2–1	1938 World Cup qualification
12	27 October 1946	Praterstadion, Vienna, Austria	Czechoslovakia	1–1	3–4	Friendly
13	27 October 1946	Praterstadion, Vienna, Austria	Czechoslovakia	2–1	3–4	Friendly
14	14 September 1947	Praterstadion, Vienna, Austria	Hungary	3–3	4–3	Friendly
15	14 September 1947	Praterstadion, Vienna, Austria	Hungary	4–3	4–3	Friendly
16	5 October 1947	Stadion Letná, Prague, Czechoslovakia	Czechoslovakia	1–1	2–3	Friendly
Germany goals
1	29 January 1939	Stade du Centenaire, Brussels, Belgium	Belgium	1–0	4–1	Friendly
2	12 November 1939	Stadion Olimpijski, Wrocław, Poland	Bohemia and Moravia	1–3	4–4	Friendly
3	12 November 1939	Stadion Olimpijski, Wrocław, Poland	Bohemia and Moravia	2–3	4–4	Friendly
4	12 November 1939	Stadion Olimpijski, Wrocław, Poland	Bohemia and Moravia	3–4	4–4	Friendly
5	26 November 1939	Olympiastadion, Berlin, Germany	Italy	1–1	5–2	Friendly
6	26 November 1939	Olympiastadion, Berlin, Germany	Italy	2–2	5–2	Friendly
7	26 November 1939	Olympiastadion, Berlin, Germany	Italy	5–2	5–2	Friendly
8	7 April 1940	Olympiastadion, Berlin, Germany	Hungary	2–1	2–2	Friendly
9	5 May 1940	San Siro, Milan, Italy	Italy	1–2	2–3	Friendly
10	5 May 1940	San Siro, Milan, Italy	Italy	2–2	2–3	Friendly

== Honours ==
=== Player ===
Rapid Wien

- Austrian Football Bundesliga: 1934–35, 1937–38, 1945–46, 1947–48
- Great Germany Gauliga: 1940, 1941
- Wiener Cup: 1945–46
- DFB-Pokal: 1938

Individual

- Austrian Bundesliga top goalscorer: 1933, 1937, 1938
- Gauliga Top Goalscorer: 1939, 1940, 1941

== See also ==
- List of men's footballers with 500 or more goals
