= 1937–38 Austrian football championship =

27th season of top-tier football league in Austria

Austrian football championship
- Season: 1937–38

Statistics of Austrian national league in the 1937–38 season.

== Overview ==
It was contested by 10 teams, and SK Rapid Wien won the championship.

== League standings ==
Pos	Team	Pld	W	D	L	GF	GA	GD	Pts
1	SK Rapid Wien	18	14	2	2	59	19	+40	30
2	Wiener Sportclub	18	9	5	4	43	29	+14	23
3	FK Austria Wien	18	8	5	5	35	29	+6	21
4	SC Wacker	18	8	4	6	44	33	+11	20
5	First Vienna FC	18	6	7	5	41	30	+11	19
6	SK Admira Wien	18	6	7	5	37	34	+3	19
7	FC Wien	18	7	3	8	40	41	−1	17
8	Floridsdorfer AC	18	5	4	9	32	32	0	14
9	Favoritner AC	18	4	4	10	29	62	−33	12
10	1. Simmeringer SC	18	2	1	15	30	81	−51	5

Source: rsssf.com

== Results ==
Home \ Away	ADM	AUS	FAV	FIR	FLO	RAP	SIM	WAK	WIE	SPO
SK Admira Wien		1–3	1–1	2–3	2–1	2–1	4–2	0–3	6–2	1–1
FK Austria Wien	0–0		3–2	1–1	2–0	1–2	3–2	1–2	2–2	2–3
Favoritner AC	1–1	1–4		1–1	3–2	0–3	1–2	2–9	3–2	0–4
First Vienna	2–2	0–2	7–0		2–1	2–2	2–0	0–1	3–3	0–1
Floridsdorfer AC	3–0	3–3	1–1	2–2		1–2	5–0	3–2	2–3	1–2
SK Rapid Wien	5–3	3–0	6–2	2–0	3–0		5–1	3–3	5–0	3–1
Simmeringer SC	3–7	0–2	6–2	2–7	1–4	1–9		3–8	2–5	3–3
SC Wacker	1–1	2–3	0–3	3–1	1–1	0–2	5–2		0–4	2–2
FC Wien	0–0	4–2	3–4	2–5	2–0	0–2	5–0	1–0		2–4
Wiener Sportclub	2–4	1–1	7–2	3–3	1–2	2–1	4–0	1–2	1–0	

Legend: Blue = home team win; Yellow = draw; Red = away team win.
