= Engelbert Smutny =

Austrian footballer (1917–1972)

Personal information
- Date of birth: 19 March 1917
- Date of death: 31 October 1972 (aged 55)
- Position: Defender

International career
Years	Team	Apps	(Gls)
1946	Austria	3	(0)

Managerial career
- 1952: Grazer AK

Engelbert Smutny (19 March 1917 – 31 October 1972) was an Austrian football player and manager who played as a defender. He made three appearances for the Austria national team in 1946.
