= Rudolf Schlauf =

Austrian footballer

Personal information
- Date of birth: 17 March 1910
- Date of death: August 1952 (aged 42)
- Position: Defender

Senior career*
Years	Team	Apps	(Gls)
1933–1935	FAC		
1935–1937	Libertas Wien		
1937–1939	SK Rapid Wien	24	(0)
1939–1945	Wacker Wien		
1945–1947	Wiener Sport-Club		
1948–1950	SC Rapid Oberlaa		

International career
1935	Austria	1	(0)
- * Club domestic league appearances and goals

Rudolf Schlauf (17 March 1910 – August 1952) was an Austrian footballer.
