= Vorwärts-Rasensport Gleiwitz =

German football club

- Full name: Sportvereinigung Vorwärts-Rasensport Gleiwitz
- Founded: 1923
- Ground: Jahn-platz
- Capacity: 15,000 (ca. 1941)
- League: Südost
Home colours	Away colours

Vorwärts-Rasensport Gleiwitz was a German association football club from the city of Gleiwitz, Upper Silesia, today Gliwice, Poland.

== History ==
The team had its origins within the gymnastics club Turnverein Vorwärts Gleiwitz established in 1878. That club formed a football department in 1910 which became independent sometime in 1923 as Sport-Club Vorwärts Gleiwitz. A merger with Rasensportverein 1909 Gleiwitz followed in 1926 creating Sportvereinigung Vorwärts-Rasensport Gleiwitz.

The newly formed team took part in local level play with occasional advances to Germany's regional Südost league through the 20s and on into the early 30s. Following the reorganization of German football under the Third Reich in 1933, they became part of the Gauliga Schlesien, one of sixteen top flight regional divisions. In 1939 and from 1941 to 1945 the club appeared in the Gauliga Oberschlesien. Over a dozen seasons VR fielded successful sides that captured divisional titles in 1935, 1936, 1938, 1939, and 1940 while finishing in second place in 1937 and 1941. That earned the club appearances in the national playoff rounds where they were each time put out in the early going with the exception of an advance to the semi-finals in 1936 where they dropped a 1:3 decision to Fortuna Düsseldorf. They lost the subsequent third place match 1:8 to Schalke 04 to finish fourth nationally. VR also took part in qualification round play for the Tschammerpokal, predecessor to today's DFB Pokal (German Cup) in each year from 1935 to 1941 with the exception of 1937.

The team delivered a series of indifferent performances after a second-place finish in 1941. Part way through the 1944–45 season the Gauliga Oberschlesien collapsed as Soviet forces advanced into the area in as World War II was being fought to its conclusion. VR disappeared with the end of the war.

== Honours ==
- Gauliga Schlesien (I) champions: 1935, 1936, 1938, 1939
- Gauliga Oberschlesien (I) champions: 1940
- Oberschlesien champions (II): 1924, 1927
