= SC Ostbahn XI =

- Full name: Sportclub SC Ostbahn XI
- Founded: 23 April 1921; 104 years ago
- Ground: Ostbahn-XI-Platz
- Capacity: 1,000
- Chairman: Dr. Turgay Taskiran
- Manager: (Austria) Ümit Korkmaz
- League: Wiener Stadtliga
- 2023–24: Austrian 2. Landesliga, 3rd of 16 (promoted)

SC Ostbahn XI are an Austrian association football club based in the Simmering (XI) district of Vienna. Founded in 1921 by employees of the East railway line, they are playing in the Austrian 2. Landesliga.

== Current squad ==
Note: Flags indicate national team as defined under FIFA eligibility rules; some limited exceptions apply. Players may hold more than one non-FIFA nationality.

No.	Pos.	Nation	Player
4	DF	TUR	Salih Yılmaz
5	DF	AUT	Cihat Kocak
6	MF	AUT	Sebastian Brunner
8	MF	TUR	Efe Arac
9	FW	AUT	Denis Safin
10	MF	AUT	Gökhan Ünver
11	DF	TUR	Erim Karakaya
14	FW	AUT	Berat Kocak
16		AUT	Kaan Solmaz
17		AUT	Mikail Ünlü
18		AUT	Denis Ivanovic
19	FW	AUT	Tunahan Bağırtlak
20	MF	AUT	Oğuzhan Önemli
23		AUT	Josef Mostafa

No.	Pos.	Nation	Player
27	DF	AUT	Mustafa Günay
55		AUT	Atilla Dede
60		AUT	Ali Yılmaz
81	DF	TUR	Muharrem Ilhan
—	GK	AUT	Christoph Feleki
—	GK	AUT	Murat Safin
—	MF	AUT	Nürettin Köse
—		AUT	Diego Sarp
—	MF	AUT	Niklas Gall
—		AUT	Alperen Yıldız
—	DF	AUT	Sebastian Schütz
—		AUT	Elton Velija
—	GK	AUT	Samuel Özdemir

== Staff ==
- Trainer: (Austria) Kurt Jusits
- Co-Trainer: (Austria) Gerald Hauer
- Co-Trainer: (Austria) Markus Millner
- Goalkeeper coach: (Austria) Herbert Gundacker
