= 1945–46 Austrian football championship =

28th season of top-tier football league in Austria

Austrian football championship
- Season: 1945–46

Statistics of Austrian first class in the 1945–46 season.

== Overview ==
It was contested by 12 teams, and SK Rapid Wien won the championship.

== League standings ==
Pos	Team	Pld	W	D	L	GF	GA	GD	Pts
1	SK Rapid Wien	22	16	3	3	99	24	+75	35
2	FK Austria Wien	22	15	4	3	102	32	+70	34
3	SC Wacker	22	13	5	4	75	28	+47	31
4	Wiener Sportclub	22	12	4	6	71	38	+33	28
5	First Vienna FC	22	12	3	7	82	41	+41	27
6	FC Wien	22	10	5	7	52	46	+6	25
7	Floridsdorfer AC	22	8	4	10	56	62	−6	20
8	Wiener AC	22	8	4	10	37	49	−12	20
9	SK Admira Wien	22	7	5	10	45	61	−16	19
10	SC Helfort	22	7	5	10	39	56	−17	19
11	SC Rapid Oberlaa	22	1	2	19	22	97	−75	4
12	ESV Ostbahn XI	22	1	0	21	11	157	−146	2

Source: rsssf.com

== Results ==
Home \ Away	ADM	AWI	FIR	FLO	FCW	HEL	OST	ROB	RWI	WAK	WAC	WIE
Admira Wien		2–7	2–5	1–3	5–2	1–1	4–0	8–0	1–1	0–5	1–1	1–0
Austria Wien	9–1		2–3	1–0	10–2	2–1	14–0	5–0	1–5	2–2	4–1	5–2
First Vienna	2–1	4–3		1–2	3–1	4–1	18–0	8–0	0–6	1–1	1–1	3–4
Floridsdorfer AC	1–1	2–9	1–5		4–2	4–1	4–0	8–1	0–4	2–6	2–2	1–2
FC Wien	7–1	1–1	3–1	3–3		1–0	8–2	4–1	1–5	2–1	2–1	0–1
Helfort	3–3	3–7	5–2	5–3	0–0		2–1	3–2	2–1	3–5	1–0	2–2
Ostbahn XI	0–6	0–9	0–12	0–5	1–4	2–3		0–3	1–9	1–9	1–3	0–8
Rapid Oberlaa	1–2	0–3	0–1	2–7	2–2	1–1	0–2		1–6	0–7	1–3	0–7
Rapid Wien	5–1	0–0	0–3	9–0	1–0	4–1	10–0	5–1		1–4	4–1	6–2
Wacker Wien	2–0	0–2	4–3	1–1	0–2	2–0	7–0	4–2	3–3		7–0	0–0
Wiener AC	1–2	1–4	4–2	3–1	1–1	3–1	5–0	3–2	0–9	3–1		0–1
Wiener SC	5–1	2–2	0–0	3–2	2–4	6–0	14–0	8–2	1–5	0–4	1–0	

Legend: Blue = home team win; Yellow = draw; Red = away team win.
