= Franz Hofer (footballer) =

German footballer

Personal information
- Date of birth: 4 September 1918
- Date of death: December 1990 (aged 72)
- Position: Striker

Senior career*
Years	Team	Apps	(Gls)
1937–1946	SK Rapid Wien	44	(15)

International career
1939	Germany	1	(0)
- * Club domestic league appearances and goals

Franz Hofer (4 September 1918 – December 1990) was an Austrian footballer.
