= Willy Fitz =

Austrian footballer and coach

Personal information
- Full name: Wilhelm Fitz
- Date of birth: 12 March 1918
- Date of death: 25 September 1993 (aged 75)
- Position: Striker

Senior career*
Years	Team	Apps	(Gls)
1938–1947	SK Rapid Wien	95	(28)
1947–1948	First Vienna FC		
1948–1954	FAC		
- Panathinaikos

International career
1942	Germany	1	(0)

Managerial career
- AEL Limassol
- * Club domestic league appearances and goals

Willy Fitz (12 March 1918 – 25 September 1993) was an Austrian footballer and coach.
