= Hermann Dvoracek =

Austrian footballer (born 1920)

Personal information
- Date of birth: 4 May 1920
- Position: Forward

Senior career*
Years	Team	Apps	(Gls)
1936–1945	SK Rapid Wien	64	(48)
1945	Helfort		
1946	FK Austria Wien	1	(0)
1946–1947	Vienna		
- * Club domestic league appearances and goals

Hermann Dvoracek (born 4 May 1920, date of death unknown) was an Austrian footballer.
