= Johann Hofstätter =

Austrian footballer and coach

Personal information
- Date of birth: 12 January 1913
- Date of death: 27 July 1996 (aged 83)
- Position: Midfielder

Senior career*
Years	Team	Apps	(Gls)
1931–1933	WAC		
1933–1937	Post SV		
1937–1945	SK Rapid Wien	111	(5)
1945–1947	1. Simmeringer SC		

International career
1940	Germany	1	(0)

Managerial career
- 1950–1962: 1. Simmeringer SC
- 1968–1969: First Vienna FC
- * Club domestic league appearances and goals

Johann Hofstätter (12 January 1913 – 27 July 1996) was an Austrian footballer and coach.
