= Wilhelm Holec =

Austrian footballer

Personal information
- Date of birth: 8 June 1914
- Date of death: 23 August 1944 (aged 30)
- Place of death: Broasca, Romania
- Position: Striker

Youth career
- 1930–1932: SR Donaufeld

Senior career*
Years	Team	Apps	(Gls)
1932	SC Viktoria XXI		
1932–1937	First Vienna FC		
1936–1942	SK Rapid Wien	46	(25)

International career
1935	Austria	1	(0)
- * Club domestic league appearances and goals

Wilhelm Holec (8 June 1914 – MIA 23 August 1944) was an Austrian footballer.
