= Franz Kaspirek =

Austrian footballer

Personal information
- Date of birth: 30 March 1918
- Date of death: 4 June 2008 (aged 90)
- Position: Forward

Senior career*
| Years | Team | Apps | (Gls) |
| 1936–1949 | SK Rapid Wien | 119 | (28) |
| 1949–1950 | Wiener Sport-Club | 3 | (0) |

International career
| 1946 | Austria | 2 | (1) |
- * Club domestic league appearances and goals

Franz Kaspirek (30 March 1918 – 4 June 2008) was an Austrian football Forward who played for Austria. He also played for SK Rapid Wien and Wiener Sport-Club.
