= Rudolf Raftl =

Austrian footballer (1911–1994)

Personal information
- Date of birth: 7 February 1911
- Place of birth: Vienna, Austria-Hungary
- Date of death: 5 September 1994 (aged 83)
- Place of death: Vienna, Austria
- Position: Goalkeeper

Senior career*
Years	Team	Apps	(Gls)
1928–29	Hertha Wien		
1930–45	Rapid Wien		
1946–48	First Vienna		

International career
1933–37	Austria	6	(0)
1938–40	Germany	6	(0)
- * Club domestic league appearances and goals

Rudolf Raftl (7 February 1911 – 5 September 1994) was an Austrian football goalkeeper.

He earned six caps for the Austria national football team and participated in the 1934 FIFA World Cup. After the annexation of Austria by Germany, he earned six caps for the Germany national football team, and participated in the 1938 FIFA World Cup.

== Career ==
- Hertha Wien (1928–1929)
- SK Rapid Wien (1930–1945)
- First Vienna FC (1946–1948)
