= Heribert Sperner =

Austrian footballer (1915–1943)

Personal information
- Date of birth: 6 September 1915
- Date of death: 28 April 1943 (aged 27)
- Position: Defender

Senior career*
Years	Team	Apps	(Gls)
1935–1943	SK Rapid Wien	76	(0)
- * Club domestic league appearances and goals

Heribert Sperner (6 September 1915 – 28 April 1943) was an Austrian footballer.
