= Stefan Skoumal =

Austrian footballer

Personal information
- Date of birth: 29 November 1909
- Date of death: 28 November 1983 (aged 73)
- Position: Midfielder

Senior career*
Years	Team	Apps	(Gls)
1929–1930	Hertha Vienna		
1930–1943	Rapid Vienna		

International career
1934–1935	Austria	4	(1)
1938–1940	Germany	3	(0)
- * Club domestic league appearances and goals

Stefan Skoumal (29 November 1909 – 28 November 1983) was an Austrian football midfielder.

He earned 4 caps for the Austria national football team. After the annexation of Austria by Germany, he earned 3 caps for the Germany national football team, and participated in the 1938 FIFA World Cup. He spent his club career at SK Rapid Wien.
