= Georg Schors =

Austrian footballer

Personal information
- Date of birth: 18 October 1913
- Date of death: 20 April 1997 (aged 83)
- Position: Striker

Senior career*
Years	Team	Apps	(Gls)
1932–1936	1. ČsŠK Bratislava		
1937	SV Hohenau		
1937–1947	SK Rapid Wien	83	(45)
1947–1949	Wiener Sport-Club		
1949–1954	Leopoldsdorf		
- * Club domestic league appearances and goals

Georg Schors (18 October 1913 – 20 April 1997) was an Austrian footballer.
