= Stefan Wagner =

Austrian footballer

Personal information
- Date of birth: 17 October 1913
- Date of death: 6 November 2002 (aged 89)
- Position: Defender

Senior career*
Years	Team	Apps	(Gls)
1933–1935	1. Simmeringer SC		
1936–1950	SK Rapid Wien	122	(0)
1951–1952	SV Gloggnitz		
1952–1953	Rennweger SV		

International career
1947	Austria	2	(0)
- * Club domestic league appearances and goals

Stefan Wagner (17 October 1913 – 6 November 2002) was an Austrian international footballer.
