= Hans Pesser =

Austrian footballer and coach

Personal information
- Full name: Johann Erik Pesser
- Date of birth: 7 November 1911
- Place of birth: Vienna, Austria-Hungary
- Date of death: 12 August 1986 (aged 74)
- Place of death: Vienna, Austria
- Position: Striker

Senior career*
Years	Team	Apps	(Gls)
1930–1942	Rapid Vienna		

International career
1935–1937	Austria	8	(3)
1938–1940	Germany	12	(2)

Managerial career
- 1945–1953: Rapid Vienna
- 1953–1960: Wiener Sportklub
- 1960–1967: Admira Wien
- 1967–1968: Austria
- * Club domestic league appearances and goals

Johann "Hans" Erik Pesser (7 November 1911 – 12 August 1986) was an Austrian football striker and coach.

== Career ==
He earned 8 caps and scored 3 goals for the Austria national football team. After the annexation of Austria by Germany, he earned 12 caps and scored 2 goals for the Germany national football team, and participated in the 1938 FIFA World Cup. He spent his club career at SK Rapid Wien, and later also managed the team, and also briefly managed the Austria national team. He won seven Austrian championship championships and three Austrian Cups during his time as a coach.

== Honours ==
=== as player ===
- Rapid Wien (4 x Austrian Champion 1935, 1938, 1940, 1941;German Cup 1938;German Champion 1941)

=== as coach ===
- Rapid Wien (1945-52: 4 x Austrian Champion, 1 x Austrian Cup, 1x Zentropacup)
- Wiener Sportklub (1953–1960: 2 x Austrian Champion)
- Admira (1 x Austrian Champion, 2 x Austrian Cup)
