= Franz Wagner (footballer) =

Austrian footballer (1911–1974)

Personal information
- Date of birth: 23 September 1911
- Place of birth: Vienna, Austria-Hungary
- Date of death: 8 December 1974 (aged 63)
- Place of death: Vienna, Austria
- Position: Midfielder

Senior career*
Years	Team	Apps	(Gls)
–1931	Vienna Cricket and Football-Club		
1931–1943	Rapid Wien	199	(1)
1944	LSV Markersdorf		
1944–1949	Rapid Wien	52	(0)

International career
1933–1936	Austria	18	(0)
1938–1942	Germany	3	(0)

Managerial career
- 1955: Rapid Wien
- * Club domestic league appearances and goals

Franz Wagner (23 September 1911 – 8 December 1974) was an Austrian footballer who played as a midfielder.

He earned 18 caps for the Austria national football team and participated in the 1934 FIFA World Cup. After the annexation of Austria by Germany, he earned 3 caps for the Germany national football team, and participated in the 1938 FIFA World Cup. He spent his club career at SK Rapid Wien.
