= List of Austrian football champions =

The Austrian football champions are the winners of the highest league of football in Austria. The championship has been contested through the Austrian Football Bundesliga since the 1974–75 season.

Rapid Wien and Austria Wien are the most successful clubs. They have won 32 and 24 titles, respectively, as of 2023.

== History ==
From 1911 until 1923 the Austrian football championship was organized by the football association of Niederösterreich (Lower Austria) which was made up only of clubs from the nation's capital of Vienna. The championship was then taken over by the newly formed football association of Vienna (WFV, Wiener Fußball-Verband), which organized the first professional league in continental Europe in 1924–25.

In 1938 Austria was united with Germany in the Anschluss and the country's football competition became part of the German league structure as the Gauliga Ostmark. For the first time clubs from outside of Vienna were included in top-flight Austrian competition.

Rapid Vienna, the most successful Austrian football club

Austrian clubs took part in the German championship during this period. An "Austrian champion" would emerge from divisional play in the Gauliga Ostmark and then move on to the German national playoffs with other Gauliga winners. Austrian clubs enjoyed a considerable measure of success playing in Germany, making three national final appearances and two Tschammerspokal (predecessor of today's German Cup) appearances: Rapid Vienna won the national title in 1941, while First Vienna took the Tschammerspokal in 1943.

Austrian football was again independent after World War II and championship play was limited to Viennese clubs until 1948–49 when clubs from the rest of Austria were re-admitted. In 1965, Linzer ASK became the first team from outside the capital to claim the Austrian title, leading the way for clubs such as FC Wacker Innsbruck, VÖEST Linz, SV Austria Salzburg, Sturm Graz, and Grazer AK.

== List of Austrian national football champions ==
Season	Winners	Runners-up
1911–12	Rapid Wien	Wiener Sport-Club
1912–13	Rapid Wien (2)	Wiener AF
1913–14	Wiener AF	Rapid Wien
1914–15	Wiener AC	Wiener AF
1915–16	Rapid Wien (3)	Floridsdorfer AC
1916–17	Rapid Wien (4)	Floridsdorfer AC
1917–18	Floridsdorfer AC	Rapid Wien
1918–19	Rapid Wien (5)	SC Rudolfshügel
1919–20	Rapid Wien (6)	SV Amateure
1920–21	Rapid Wien (7)	SV Amateure
1921–22	Wiener Sport-Club	Hakoah Vienna
1922–23	Rapid Wien (8)	SV Amateure
1923–24	SV Amateure	First Vienna FC
1924–25	Hakoah Vienna	SV Amateure
1925–26	SV Amateure (2)	First Vienna FC
1926–27	SK Admira Wien	Brigittenauer AC
1927–28	SK Admira Wien (2)	Rapid Wien
1928–29	Rapid Wien (9)	SK Admira Wien
1929–30	Rapid Wien (10)	SK Admira Wien
1930–31	First Vienna FC	SK Admira Wien
1931–32	SK Admira Wien (3)	First Vienna FC
1932–33	First Vienna FC (2)	Rapid Wien
1933–34	SK Admira Wien (4)	Rapid Wien
1934–35	Rapid Wien (11)	SK Admira Wien
1935–36	SK Admira Wien (5)	First Vienna FC
1936–37	SK Admira Wien (6)	Austria Wien
1937–38	Rapid Wien (12)	Wiener Sport-Club
1938–1945	Part of Gauliga Ostmark, Germany	
1938–39	SK Admira Wien (7)	SC Wacker Wien
1939–40	Rapid Wien (13)	SC Wacker Wien
1940–41	Rapid Wien (14)	SC Wacker Wien
1941–42	First Vienna FC (3)	FC Wien
1942–43	First Vienna FC (4)	Wiener AC
1943–44	First Vienna FC (5)	Floridsdorfer AC
1944–45	Not Finished with Rapid Vienna being 1st after 9 games.	
1945–46	Rapid Wien (15)	Austria Wien
1946–47	SC Wacker Wien (8)	Rapid Wien
1947–48	Rapid Wien (16)	SC Wacker Wien
1948–49	Austria Wien (3)	Rapid Wien
1949–50	Austria Wien (4)	Rapid Wien
1950–51	Rapid Wien (17)	SC Wacker Wien
1951–52	Rapid Wien (18)	Austria Wien
1952–53	Austria Wien (5)	SC Wacker Wien
1953–54	Rapid Wien (19)	Austria Wien
1954–55	First Vienna FC (6)	Wiener Sport-Club
1955–56	Rapid Wien (20)	SC Wacker Wien
1956–57	Rapid Wien (21)	First Vienna FC
1957–58	Wiener Sport-Club (2)	Rapid Wien
1958–59	Wiener Sport-Club (3)	Rapid Wien
1959–60	Rapid Wien (22)	Wiener Sport-Club
1960–61	Austria Wien (6)	First Vienna FC
1961–62	Austria Wien (7)	LASK
1962–63	Austria Wien (8)	SK Admira Wien
1963–64	Rapid Wien (23)	Austria Wien
1964–65	LASK	Rapid Wien
1965–66	SK Admira Wien (9)	Rapid Wien
1966–67	Rapid Wien (24)	Wacker Innsbruck
1967–68	Rapid Wien (25)	Wacker Innsbruck
1968–69	Austria Wien (9)	Wiener Sport-Club
1969–70	Austria Wien (10)	Wiener Sport-Club
1970–71	Wacker Innsbruck	SV Austria Salzburg
1971–72	Wacker Innsbruck (2)	Austria Wien
1972–73	Wacker Innsbruck (3)	Rapid Wien
1973–74	VÖEST Linz	Wacker Innsbruck

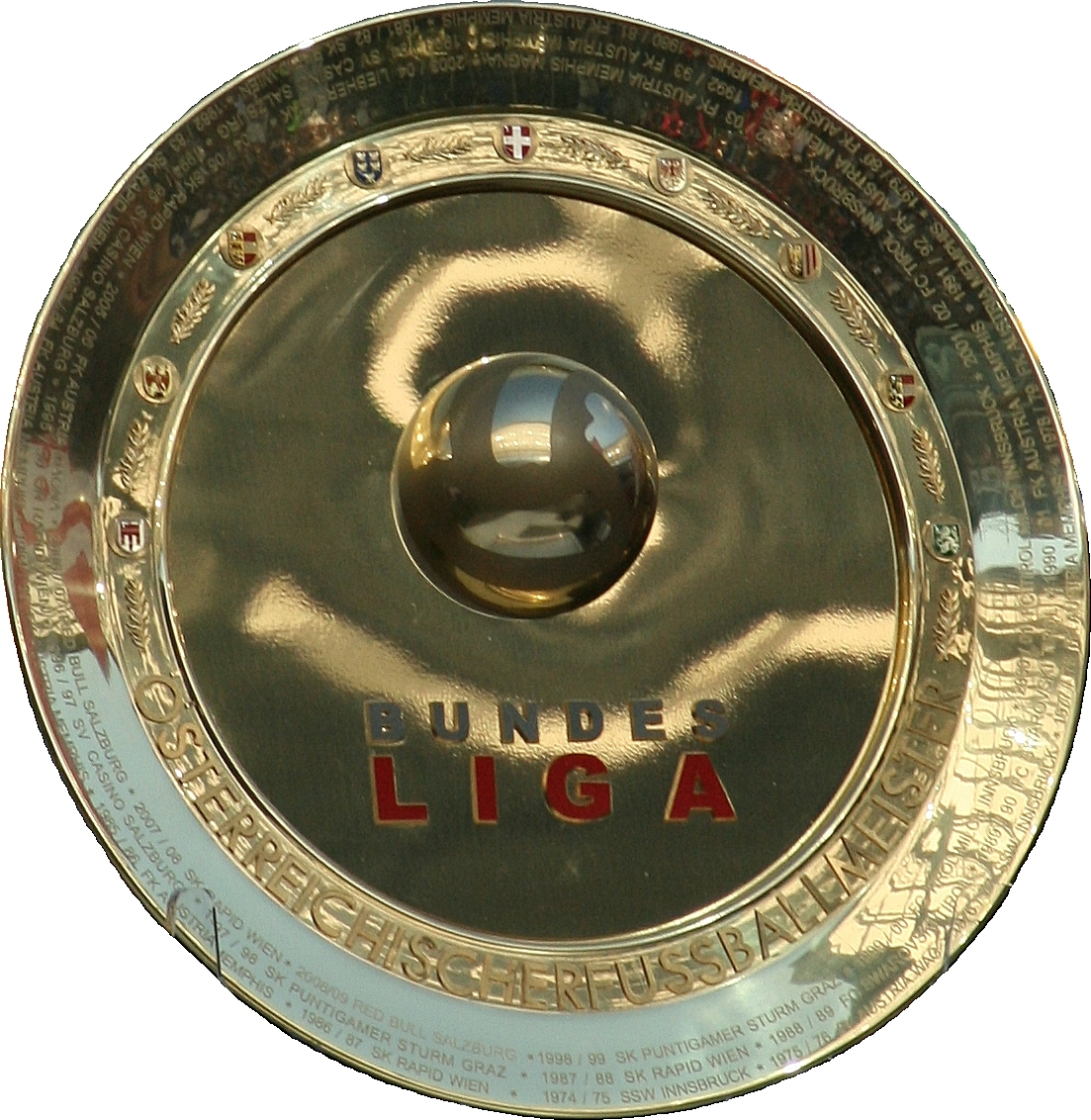
Trophy of the Austrian Football Bundesliga

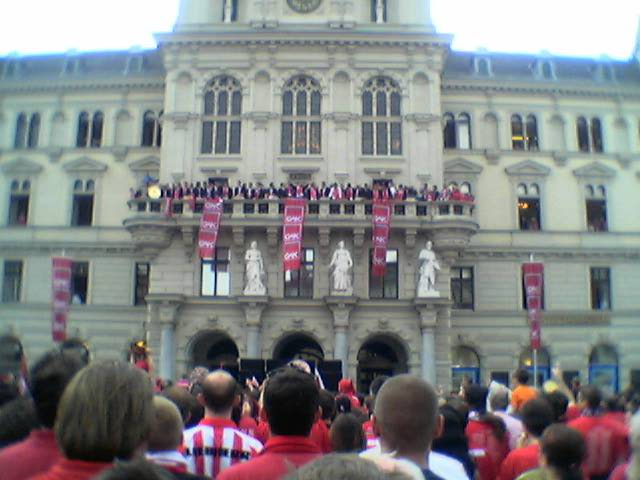
Grazer AK (GAK) (2004)

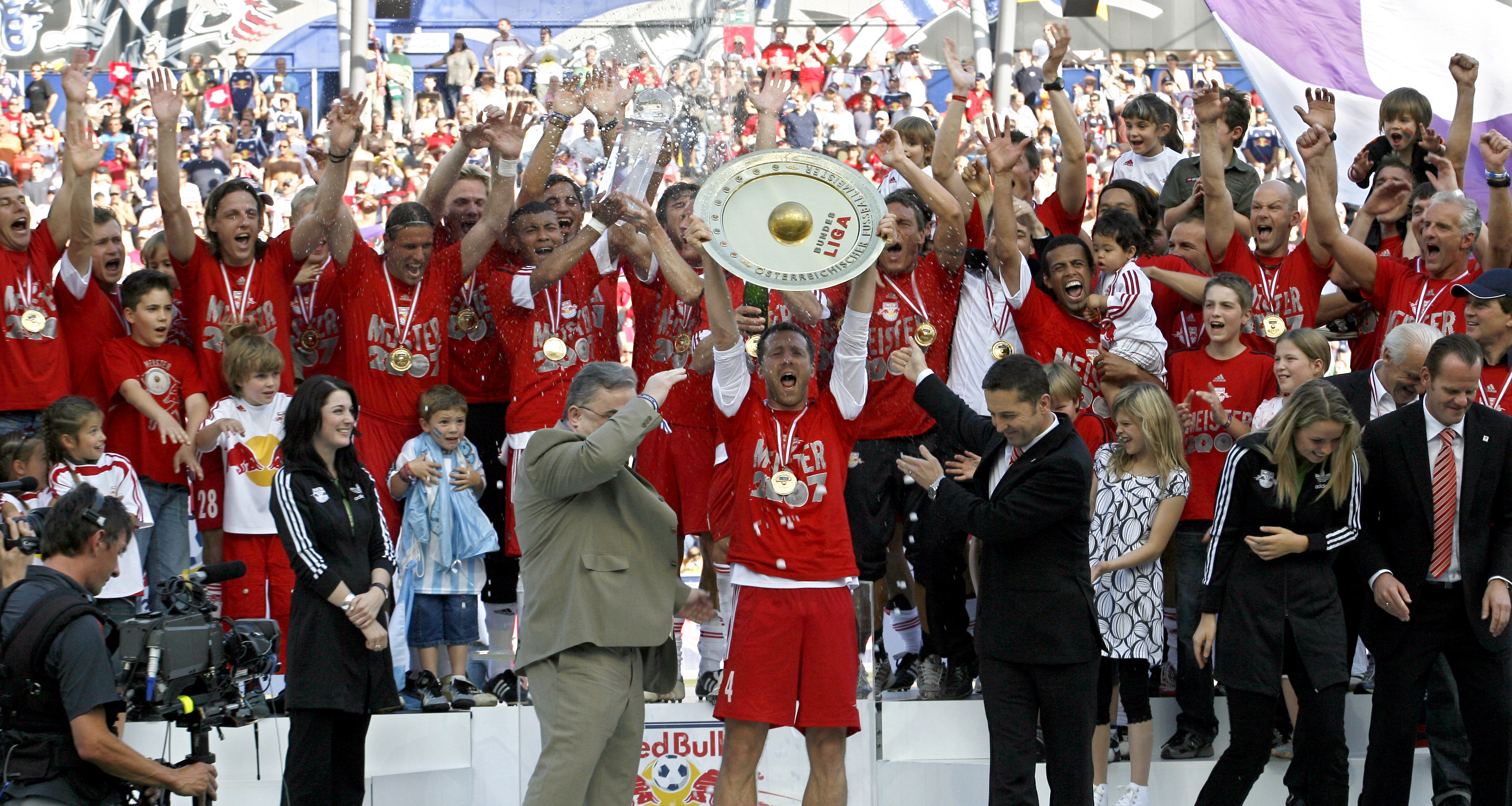
Red Bull Salzburg (2007)

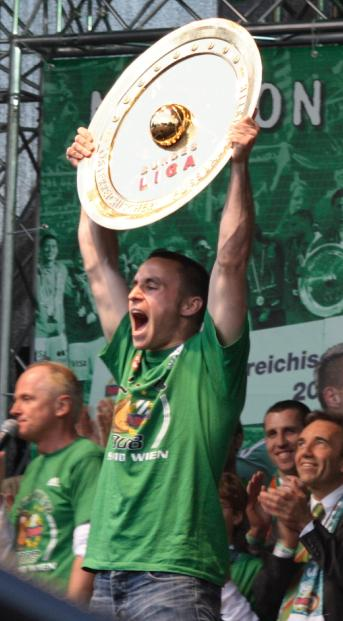
Steffen Hofmann celebrating the Rapid Wien Championship (2008)

Season	Winners	Runners-up
Introduction of Bundesliga.
1974–75	Wacker Innsbruck (4)	VÖEST Linz
1975–76	Austria WAC Wien (11)	Wacker Innsbruck
1976–77	Wacker Innsbruck (5)	Rapid Wien
1977–78	Austria Wien (12)	Rapid Wien
1978–79	Austria Wien (13)	Wiener Sport-Club
1979–80	Austria Wien (14)	VÖEST Linz
1980–81	Austria Wien (15)	Sturm Graz
1981–82	Rapid Wien (26)	Austria Wien
1982–83	Rapid Wien (27)	Austria Wien
1983–84	Austria Wien (16)	Rapid Wien
1984–85	Austria Wien (17)	Rapid Wien
1985–86	Austria Wien (18)	Rapid Wien
1986–87	Rapid Wien (28)	Austria Wien
1987–88	Rapid Wien (29)	Austria Wien
1988–89	Swarovski Tirol (6)	Admira Wacker Wien
1989–90	Swarovski Tirol (7)	Austria Wien
1990–91	Austria Wien (19)	Swarovski Tirol
1991–92	Austria Wien (20)	SV Austria Salzburg
1992–93	Austria Wien (21)	SV Austria Salzburg
1993–94	SV Austria Salzburg	Austria Wien
1994–95	SV Austria Salzburg (2)	Sturm Graz
1995–96	Rapid Wien (30)	Sturm Graz
1996–97	SV Austria Salzburg (3)	Rapid Wien
1997–98	Sturm Graz	Rapid Wien
1998–99	Sturm Graz (2)	Rapid Wien
1999–2000	Tirol Innsbruck (8)	Sturm Graz
2000–01	Tirol Innsbruck (9)	Rapid Wien
2001–02	Tirol Innsbruck (10)	Sturm Graz
2002–03	Austria Wien (22)	Grazer AK
2003–04	Grazer AK	Austria Wien
2004–05	Rapid Wien (31)	Grazer AK
2005–06	Austria Wien (23)	Red Bull Salzburg
2006–07	Red Bull Salzburg (4)	SV Ried
2007–08	Rapid Wien (32)	Red Bull Salzburg
2008–09	Red Bull Salzburg (5)	Rapid Wien
2009–10	Red Bull Salzburg (6)	Austria Wien
2010–11	Sturm Graz (3)	Red Bull Salzburg
2011–12	Red Bull Salzburg (7)	Rapid Wien
2012–13	Austria Wien (24)	Red Bull Salzburg
2013–14	Red Bull Salzburg (8)	Rapid Wien
2014–15	Red Bull Salzburg (9)	Rapid Wien
2015–16	Red Bull Salzburg (10)	Rapid Wien
2016–17	Red Bull Salzburg (11)	Austria Wien
2017–18	Red Bull Salzburg (12)	Sturm Graz
2018–19	Red Bull Salzburg (13)	LASK
2019–20	Red Bull Salzburg (14)	Rapid Wien
2020–21	Red Bull Salzburg (15)	Rapid Wien
2021–22	Red Bull Salzburg (16)	Sturm Graz
2022–23	Red Bull Salzburg (17)	Sturm Graz
2023–24	Sturm Graz (4)	Red Bull Salzburg
2024–25	Sturm Graz (5)	Red Bull Salzburg
2025–26	LASK (2)	Sturm Graz

== Performance ==
=== Performance by club ===
Club	Winners	Runners-up	Winning Seasons
Rapid Wien	32	29	1911–12, 1912–13, 1915–16, 1916–17, 1918–19, 1919–20, 1920–21, 1922–23, 1928–29, 1929–30, 1934–35, 1937–38, 1939–40, 1940–41, 1945–46, 1947–48, 1950–51, 1951–52, 1953–54, 1955–56, 1956–57, 1959–60, 1963–64, 1966–67, 1967–68, 1981–82, 1982–83, 1986–87, 1987–88, 1995–96, 2004–05, 2007–08
Austria Wien	24	19	1923–24, 1925–26, 1948–49, 1949–50, 1952–53, 1960–61, 1961–62, 1962–63, 1968–69, 1969–70, 1975–76, 1977–78, 1978–79, 1979–80, 1980–81, 1983–84, 1984–85, 1985–86, 1990–91, 1991–92, 1992–93, 2002–03, 2005–06, 2012–13
Red Bull Salzburg ‡	17	9	1993–94, 1994–95, 1996–97, 2006–07, 2008–09, 2009–10, 2011–12, 2013–14, 2014–15, 2015–16, 2016–17, 2017–18, 2018–19, 2019–20, 2020–21, 2021–22, 2022–23
FC Wacker Innsbruck (5) (4); FC Swarovski Tirol (2) (1); FC Tirol Innsbruck (3) (–) †	10	5	1970–71, 1971–72, 1972–73, 1974–75, 1976–77, 1988–89, 1989–90, 1999–2000, 2000–01, 2001–02
SK Admira Wien (8) (5); SC Wacker Wien (1) (7); Admira Wacker Wien (–) (1) *	9	13	1926–27, 1927–28, 1931–32, 1933–34, 1935–36, 1936–37, 1938–39, 1946–47, 1965–66
First Vienna FC	6	6	1930–31, 1932–33, 1941–42, 1942–43, 1943–44, 1954–55
Sturm Graz	5	9	1997–98, 1998–99, 2010–11, 2023–24, 2024–25
Wiener Sport-Club	3	7	1921–22, 1957–58, 1958–59
LASK	2	2	1964–65, 2025–26
Floridsdorfer AC	1	3	1917–18
Wiener AF	1	2	1913–14
VÖEST Linz	1	2	1973–74
Grazer AK	1	2	2003–04
Wiener AC	1	1	1914–15
Hakoah Vienna	1	1	1924–25
SC Rudolfshügel	–	1	–
Brigittenauer AC	–	1	–
FC Wien	–	1	–
SV Ried	–	1	–

Notes:

- † All teams are defunct clubs from Innsbruck, Tirol. Wacker Innsbruck (1915–1999), Swarovski Tirol (1986–1992) and Tirol Innsbruck (1993–2002). They are considered to be the continuation of each other.
- ‡ The Red Bull company bought the club on 6 April 2005 and rebranded it. Prior to 2005 the team was known as SV Austria Salzburg or Casino Salzburg. They also changed the colours from white-violet to red-white. The Violet-Whites ultimately formed a new club, SV Austria Salzburg.
- * FC Admira Wacker Mödling was formed after the merger of SK Admira Wien and SC Wacker Wien in 1971, under the name of Admira Wacker Wien, the merger with VfB Mödling in 1997 and the merger with SK Schwadorf in 2008. The new team plays in Mödling.

== Name changes ==
- Austria Wien was known as SV Amateure until 1926. From 1973–74 season, Wiener AC formed a joint team with FK Austria Wien, which was called FK Austria WAC Wien until 1976–77 season when Austria Wien decided to revert to their own club's traditional name. The results of the joint team are part of the Austria Wien football history.
- SK Admira Wien and SC Wacker Wien merged in 1971 to form FC Admira Wacker Wien and played in the Südstadt Stadium at Maria Enzersdorf in Lower Austria. A subsequent merger with VfB Mödling in 1997 saw the club renamed VfB Admira Wacker Mödling.
- Wacker Innsbruck changed names frequently and was also briefly united with WSG Wattens. Successor side Tirol Innsbruck folded in 2002.
- SV Austria Salzburg was renamed FC Red Bull Salzburg after being purchased and re-made by energy drink maker Red Bull in April 2005. A new side using the original name SV Austria Salzburg was established by SV fans the same year and after winning 5 championships, from level 7, now they play in the Austrian Football First League, one league lower than Austrian Football Bundesliga.

== See also ==
- Austrian Football First League
- Austrian Cup
- Austrian Supercup
