= Anton Schall =

Austrian footballer (1907–1947)

Personal information
- Date of birth: 22 June 1907
- Place of birth: Vienna, Austria-Hungary
- Date of death: 5 August 1947 (aged 40)
- Place of death: Zürich, Switzerland
- Positions: Forward; defender

Senior career*
Years	Team	Apps	(Gls)
1922–1923	Leopoldauer SC		
1923–1925	Jedlersdorf		
1925–1941	Admira Vienna	288	(234)

International career
1927–1934	Austria	28	(27)

Managerial career
- 1946–1947: FC Basel
Medal record
Men's football
Representing Austria
Central European International Cup
Silver medal – second place	1927-30 Central European International Cup
Central European International Cup
Gold medal – first place	1931-32 Central European International Cup
- * Club domestic league appearances and goals

Anton Schall (22 June 1907 – 5 August 1947) was an Austrian football forward who played for the celebrated Austrian national side of the early 1930s that became known as the Wunderteam. He also played for Admira Vienna, and later managed FC Basel. Normally a versatile left footed forward or winger, Schall is considered one of the greatest Austrian men's footballers. A pacy, skillful forward, Schall possessed fine finishing and great attacking intelligence. Later in his career Schall played as a defender.

His success with the national team included making Runner-up at the 1927-30 Central European International Cup, Winner at the 1931-32 Central European International Cup being top scorer for Austria & reaching the semifinals at the 1934 FIFA World Cup.

After his playing career, Schall, who suffered from a rare heart condition, moved to Switzerland and took over Basel as club trainer in the 1946–47 season. Schall led Basel to win the Swiss Cup, 3–0 in the final against Lausanne Sports. However, he died shortly afterwards aged 40 during a workout on the football field. Team captain Ernst Hufschmid then took Basel over as coach.

== Career statistics ==
Club	Season	Austrian First League		Austrian Cup		Mitropa Cup		Friendlies		Total	
Club	Season	Apps	Goals	Apps	Goals	Apps	Goals	Apps	Goals	Apps	Goals
Admira Vienna	1925–26	10	7	0	0	0	0	0	0	10	7
Admira Vienna	1926–27	23	27	4	8	0	0	0	0	27	35
Admira Vienna	1927–28	23	36	5	7	2	2	0	0	30	45
Admira Vienna	1928–29	22	21	3	6	4	2	0	0	29	29
Admira Vienna	1929–30	20	21	2	5	0	0	0	0	22	26
Admira Vienna	1930–31	18	25	8	13	0	0	0	0	26	38
Admira Vienna	1931–32	22	22	4	6	2	0	0	0	28	28
Admira Vienna	1932–33	21	22	2	2	0	0	0	0	23	24
Admira Vienna	1933–34	18	17	5	14	1	1	0	0	24	32
Admira Vienna	1934–35	18	15	0	0	0	0	0	0	18	15
Admira Vienna	1936–36	15	8	2	0	0	0	0	0	17	8
Admira Vienna	1936–37	22	4	3	1	4	1	0	0	29	6
Admira Vienna	1937–38	15	5	2	0	0	0	0	0	17	5
Admira Vienna	1938–39	17	4	1	0	0	0	0	0	18	4
Admira Vienna	1939–40	11	0	0	0	0	0	0	0	11	0
Admira Vienna	1940–41	12	0	3	0	0	0	0	0	15	0
Admira Vienna	1941–42	1	0	8	2	0	0	0	0	9	2
Admira Vienna	Total	288	234	52	64	13	6	0	0	353	304

== International ==
Austria

- Central European International Cup: 1931-32
- Central European International Cup: Runner-up: 1927-30
- FIFA World Cup: Semifinals - fourth place: 1934

== International goals ==
Austria's goal tally first

#	Date	Venue	Opponent	Score	Result	Competition
1.	22 May 1927	Hohe Warte Stadium, Vienna, Austria	Belgium	2–1	4–1	Friendly
2.	22 May 1927	Hohe Warte Stadium, Vienna, Austria	Belgium	4–1	4–1	Friendly
3.	27 October 1929	Wankdorf Stadium, Bern, Switzerland	Switzerland	3–1	3–1	1927–30 Central European International Cup
4.	16 November 1930	Hohe Warte Stadium, Vienna, Austria	Sweden	3–1	4–1	Friendly
5.	16 May 1931	Hohe Warte Stadium, Vienna, Austria	Scotland	1–0	5–0	Friendly
6.	24 May 1931	Deutsches Stadion, Berlin, Germany	Germany	1–0	6–0	Friendly
7.	24 May 1931	Deutsches Stadion, Berlin, Germany	Germany	3–0	6–0	Friendly
8.	24 May 1931	Deutsches Stadion, Berlin, Germany	Germany	5–0	6–0	Friendly
9.	13 September 1931	Praterstadion, Vienna, Austria	Germany	2–0	5–0	Friendly
10.	29 November 1931	Nordstern, Basel, Switzerland	Switzerland	3–1	8–1	1931-32 Central European International Cup
11.	29 November 1931	Nordstern, Basel, Switzerland	Switzerland	7–1	8–1	1931-32 Central European International Cup
12.	29 November 1931	Nordstern, Basel, Switzerland	Switzerland	8–1	8–1	1931-32 Central European International Cup
13.	24 April 1932	Hohe Warte Stadium, Vienna, Austria	Hungary	4–1	8–2	Friendly
14.	24 April 1932	Hohe Warte Stadium, Vienna, Austria	Hungary	5–2	8–2	Friendly
15.	24 April 1932	Hohe Warte Stadium, Vienna, Austria	Hungary	7–2	8–2	Friendly
16.	24 April 1932	Hohe Warte Stadium, Vienna, Austria	Hungary	8–2	8–2	Friendly
17.	2 October 1932	Üllői úti stadion, Budapest, Hungary	Hungary	1–1	3–2	Friendly
18.	23 October 1932	Praterstadion, Vienna, Austria	Switzerland	2–0	3–1	1931-32 Central European International Cup
19.	23 October 1932	Praterstadion, Vienna, Austria	Switzerland	3–0	3–1	1931-32 Central European International Cup
20.	11 December 1932	Jubilee Stadium, Brussels, Belgium	Belgium	1–0	6–1	Friendly
21.	11 December 1932	Jubilee Stadium, Brussels, Belgium	Belgium	2–0	6–1	Friendly
22.	11 December 1932	Jubilee Stadium, Brussels, Belgium	Belgium	3–0	6–1	Friendly
23.	11 December 1932	Jubilee Stadium, Brussels, Belgium	Belgium	4–0	6–1	Friendly
24.	1 October 1933	Praterstadion, Vienna, Austria	Hungary	2–0	2–2	Friendly
25.	29 November 1933	Hampden Park, Glasgow, Scotland	Scotland	2–2	2–2	Friendly
26.	15 April 1934	Praterstadion, Vienna, Austria	Hungary	3–2	5–2	Friendly
27.	27 May 1934	Stadio Benito Mussolini, Turin, Italy	France	2–1	3–2	1934 FIFA World Cup
