= 1922–23 Austrian First Class =

12th season of top-tier football league in Austria

Austrian First Class
- Season: 1922–23
- Champions: SK Rapid Wien (8th Austrian title)
- Relegated: Floridsdorfer AC; Wiener AC; SC Rudolfshügel
- Matches played: 144
- Goals scored: 593 (4.12 per match)
- Top goalscorer: Ferdinand Swatosch (21 goals)

The 1922–23 Austrian First Class season was the twelfth season of top-tier football in Austria. SK Rapid Wien claim their eighth Austrian title after winning the title by four points over second place SV Amateure. On the other end of the table, Floridsdorfer AC, Wiener AC and SC Rudolfshügel were all relegated to the second tier of Austrian football.

== League standings ==
Pos	Team	Pld	W	D	L	GF	GA	GD	Pts	Qualification
1	SK Rapid Wien	24	15	6	3	78	42	+36	36	
2	SV Amateure	24	14	4	6	65	35	+30	32	
3	SK Admira Wien	24	12	3	9	60	52	+8	27	
4	First Vienna FC	24	10	5	9	46	52	−6	25	
5	Wiener Sportclub	24	9	7	8	40	34	+6	25	
6	SC Wacker	24	8	9	7	42	40	+2	25	
7	Hakoah Vienna	24	9	6	9	44	33	+11	24	
8	ASV Hertha	24	7	10	7	40	41	−1	24	
9	1. Simmeringer SC	24	8	7	9	36	43	−7	23	
10	Wiener AF	24	8	5	11	34	53	−19	21	
11	Floridsdorfer AC	24	6	6	12	42	54	−12	18	Relegated to the Second Class
12	Wiener AC	24	5	7	12	36	58	−22	17	Relegated to the Second Class
13	SC Rudolfshügel	24	6	3	15	30	56	−26	15	Relegated to the Second Class

Source: rsssf.com

== Results ==
Home \ Away	ADM	AMA	FIR	FLO	HAK	HER	RAP	RUD	SIM	WAK	WAC	WAF	SPO
SK Admira Wien		2–1	5–1	5–1	2–1	2–2	0–1	5–2	4–1	4–1	5–2	1–2	5–1
SV Amateure	3–1		3–4	2–5	1–2	4–0	7–3	3–1	0–1	4–2	3–0	1–0	1–1
First Vienna	3–2	2–3		3–2	4–2	1–1	0–8	1–2	3–1	2–2	4–0	3–4	0–1
Floridsdorfer AC	1–1	3–3	2–3		1–1	1–3	0–3	3–1	4–1	1–1	3–0	2–1	0–2
Hakoah Vienna	6–1	0–1	0–1	6–1		1–1	2–3	4–1	1–1	1–4	5–1	1–0	2–4
ASV Hertha	1–2	1–3	2–1	2–1	0–0		3–4	3–1	1–3	2–2	3–3	1–2	1–2
SK Rapid Wien	5–1	0–3	5–2	6–4	1–1	3–3		6–0	3–4	6–2	2–2	2–2	2–1
SC Rudolfshügel	2–2	3–2	1–0	2–3	1–0	0–1	1–5		1–0	1–2	2–0	1–2	1–3
Simmeringer SC	3–6	2–2	0–1	0–0	1–2	0–2	1–1	3–1		3–2	2–2	0–0	1–1
SC Wacker	2–3	1–1	2–2	2–1	1–0	1–1	1–1	3–1	1–2		3–0	5–0	2–2
Wiener AC	5–1	0–3	3–3	2–2	0–2	1–3	0–2	2–1	1–2	0–0		1–0	5–3
Wiener AF	1–0	0–8	1–1	2–1	1–3	2–2	2–4	2–2	1–3	3–0	3–5		2–1
Wiener Sportclub	4–0	1–3	0–1	2–0	1–1	0–0	0–2	1–1	3–1	0–1	1–1	5–1	

Legend: Blue = home team win; Yellow = draw; Red = away team win.
