= Karl Heinlein =

Austrian footballer

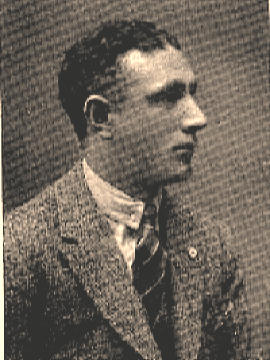
- Karl Heinlein in 1920

Personal information
- Full name: Karl Heinlein
- Date of birth: 25 April 1892
- Place of birth: Vienna, Austro-Hungary
- Date of death: 2 May 1960 (aged 68)
- Position: Midfielder

Senior career*
Years	Team	Apps	(Gls)
1914–1918	Wiener AC	109	(48)
1919–1921	Građanski Zagreb	32	(29)
1922–1924	First Vienna	29	(4)

International career
1917–1919	Austria	2	(0)

Managerial career
- 1919–1921: Građanski Zagreb
- 1928–1929: CE Europa
- 1934–1935: FC Luzern
- * Club domestic league appearances and goals

Karl Henlein (25 April 1892 – 2 May 1960) was an Austrian football manager and former player.

== Club career ==
Born in Austrian capital Vienna, Heinlein played with Wiener AC (also known as WAC) in the Austrian First Class since its first edition in season 1911–12 till the winter break of the 1918–19 season. Next, he moved to Yugoslavia where he became player/manager of HŠK Građanski Zagreb and has won two titles of the Zagreb Subassociation first League. In the winter-break of the 1921–22 season he returned to Austria and played three more seasons with First Vienna FC in Austrian top-flight.

== International career ==
Karl Heinlein made 2 appearances for the Austria national football team, one in 1917 and another in 1919.

== Coaching career ==
Karl Heinlein started his coaching career while he was still a player, by coaching HŠK Građanski Zagreb at same time he played there. Later he coached Spanish side CE Europa in the 1929 La Liga and later Swiss side FC Luzern in the season 1934–35.
