= 1915–16 Austrian First Class =

5th season of top-tier football league in Austria

Austrian First Class
- Season: 1915–16
- Champions: SK Rapid Wien (3rd Austrian title)
- Matches played: 90
- Goals scored: 430 (4.78 per match)
- Top goalscorer: Richard Kuthan (24 goals)

The 1915–16 Austrian First Class season was the fifth season of top-tier football in Austria. It was won by SK Rapid Wien who would finish two points ahead of second place Floridsdorfer AC.

== League standings ==
Pos	Team	Pld	W	D	L	GF	GA	GD	Pts
1	SK Rapid Wien	18	15	1	2	87	26	+61	31
2	Floridsdorfer AC	18	14	1	3	51	18	+33	29
3	Wiener AF	18	12	2	4	65	24	+41	26
4	Wiener AC	18	12	2	4	64	35	+29	26
5	SC Rudolfshügel	18	10	2	6	54	39	+15	22
6	SC Wacker	18	6	6	6	28	34	−6	18
7	SV Amateure	18	6	2	10	23	46	−23	14
8	Wiener Sportclub	18	3	1	14	28	49	−21	7
9	1. Simmeringer SC	18	2	0	16	18	91	−73	4
10	ASV Hertha	18	1	1	16	12	68	−56	3

Source: rsssf.com

== Results ==
Home \ Away	AMA	FLO	HER	RAP	RUD	SIM	WAK	WAC	WAF	SPO
SV Amateure		0–1	2–0	0–4	2–7	2–1	3–5	0–1	1–4	3–0
Floridsdorfer AC	3–1		1–0	2–3	3–0	7–0	3–0	1–0	4–3	2–1
ASV Hertha	1–2	0–3		1–8	0–1	4–3	1–3	0–6	0–5	0–2
SK Rapid Wien	9–0	2–1	10–3		2–0	8–0	4–2	7–1	2–1	6–1
SC Rudolfshügel	3–0	1–2	4–0	3–3		6–3	2–1	0–3	3–2	6–4
Simmeringer SC	0–1	0–6	2–0	1–7	1–8		3–4	0–6	0–6	1–4
SC Wacker	1–1	1–1	0–0	1–5	4–1	1–0		1–1	0–0	1–0
Wiener AC	3–3	5–3	8–1	5–2	5–3	8–3	4–1		2–4	2–1
Wiener AF	2–0	1–2	6–0	2–1	3–3	9–0	4–1	4–2		3–1
Wiener Sportclub	1–2	0–6	2–1	2–4	1–3	4–0	1–1	1–2	2–6	

Source: Almanacco Illustrato del Calcio - La Storia 1898-2004, Panini Edizioni, Modena, September 2005 (in Italian)
Legend: Blue = home team win; Yellow = draw; Red = away team win.
