= 1917–18 Austrian First Class =

7th season of top-tier football league in Austria

Austrian First Class
- Season: 1917–18
- Champions: Floridsdorfer AC (1st Austrian title)
- Matches played: 90
- Goals scored: 361 (4.01 per match)
- Top goalscorer: Eduard Bauer (20 goals)

The 1917–18 Austrian First Class season was the seventh season of top-tier football in Austria. It was won by Floridsdorfer AC who would finish ahead of SK Rapid Wien by goal difference.

== League standings ==
Pos	Team	Pld	W	D	L	GF	GA	GD	Pts
1	Floridsdorfer AC	18	9	6	3	47	16	+31	24
2	SK Rapid Wien	18	9	6	3	46	23	+23	24
3	Wiener AF	18	10	2	6	52	41	+11	22
4	SC Rudolfshügel	18	9	4	5	45	31	+14	22
5	Wiener AC	18	5	8	5	33	24	+9	18
6	SC Wacker	18	7	3	8	26	35	−9	17
7	Wiener Sportclub	18	6	3	9	35	50	−15	15
8	SV Amateure	18	4	7	7	23	33	−10	15
9	1. Simmeringer SC	18	6	2	10	30	47	−17	14
10	ASV Hertha	18	1	7	10	24	61	−37	9

Source: rsssf.com

== Results ==
Home \ Away	AMA	FLO	HER	RAP	RUD	SIM	WAK	WAC	WAF	SPO
SV Amateure		0–6	2–2	1–0	0–0	5–1	1–2	1–1	1–3	3–4
Floridsdorfer AC	0–0		5–0	1–1	1–3	2–0	4–1	0–0	6–1	4–0
ASV Hertha	2–2	2–2		1–1	1–4	1–1	1–2	0–0	1–5	4–2
SK Rapid Wien	6–1	2–0	5–2		2–4	6–1	3–1	3–3	2–1	1–1
SC Rudolfshügel	1–1	2–1	7–2	3–2		5–1	3–0	2–2	0–0	4–0
Simmeringer SC	0–2	0–5	5–1	2–3	3–0		4–0	0–6	2–1	3–3
SC Wacker	1–0	1–1	5–1	1–1	1–0	0–1		2–3	1–1	2–0
Wiener AC	1–1	1–1	6–0	0–0	2–1	1–3	1–2		2–4	1–3
Wiener AF	3–0	1–3	5–1	0–7	4–3	3–2	7–2	3–0		4–1
Wiener Sportclub	0–2	1–5	2–2	0–1	6–1	4–3	3–2	0–4	5–4	

Source: Almanacco Illustrato del Calcio - La Storia 1898-2004, Panini Edizioni, Modena, September 2005 (in Italian)
Legend: Blue = home team win; Yellow = draw; Red = away team win.
