= 1946–47 Austrian football championship =

29th season of top-tier football league in Austria

Austrian football championship
- Season: 1946–47

Statistics of Austrian league in the 1946–47 season.

== Overview ==
It was contested by 11 teams, and SC Wacker won the championship.

== League standings ==
Pos	Team	Pld	W	D	L	GF	GA	GD	Pts
1	SC Wacker Wien	20	14	2	4	61	24	+37	30
2	SK Rapid Wien	20	13	2	5	60	36	+24	28
3	First Vienna FC	20	13	1	6	51	29	+22	27
4	FC Wien	20	9	5	6	40	28	+12	23
5	Floridsdorfer AC	20	7	6	7	39	38	+1	20
6	SK Admira Wien	20	8	4	8	34	36	−2	20
7	FK Austria Wien	20	8	3	9	45	36	+9	19
8	Wiener Sportclub	20	7	5	8	25	39	−14	19
9	Wiener AC	20	6	4	10	31	45	−14	16
10	SCR Hochstädt	20	5	3	12	29	51	−22	13
11	Post SV	20	2	1	17	30	83	−53	5

Source: rsssf.com

== Results ==
Home \ Away	ADM	AWI	FIR	FLO	FCW	HOC	POS	RWI	WAK	WAC	WIE
Admira Wien		9–2	0–1	0–3	0–2	2–2	4–0	0–2	3–2	2–2	0–0
Austria Wien	8–0		2–3	0–1	1–3	4–0	5–2	0–3	1–2	4–1	3–0
First Vienna	0–1	2–0		1–0	3–2	2–1	5–2	2–2	0–3	1–0	3–4
Floridsdorfer AC	3–1	2–2	0–3		0–0	4–2	4–2	5–4	1–4	3–3	2–2
FC Wien	0–3	2–0	2–1	3–1		4–0	6–1	3–2	2–3	1–1	0–0
Hochstädt	2–3	0–5	1–0	1–0	1–1		6–2	0–4	1–5	1–3	5–1
Post SV	1–4	1–1	3–8	0–3	2–3	2–3		3–8	1–8	2–5	2–0
Rapid Wien	4–0	2–3	0–4	2–2	4–3	4–1	0–1		3–2	2–0	5–1
Wacker Wien	2–0	2–1	4–1	3–1	1–1	1–1	5–0	4–5		1–0	0–2
Wiener AC	0–2	0–2	1–6	2–2	3–2	2–1	3–2	1–2	0–5		1–2
Wiener SC	0–0	1–1	1–5	3–2	1–0	2–0	2–1	1–2	0–4	2–3	

Legend: Blue = home team win; Yellow = draw; Red = away team win.
