= 1921–22 Austrian First Class =

11th season of top-tier football league in Austria

Austrian First Class
- Season: 1921–22
- Champions: Wiener Sportclub (1st Austrian title)
- Relegated: Wiener AC
- Matches played: 144
- Goals scored: 573 (3.98 per match)
- Top goalscorer: Richard Kuthan (21 goals)

The 1921–22 Austrian First Class season was the eleventh season of top-tier football in Austria. Wiener Sportclub claim their first Austrian title after winning the title by two points over second place Hakoah Vienna while FC Ostmark was relegated to the second tier.

== League standings ==
Pos	Team	Pld	W	D	L	GF	GA	GD	Pts
1	Wiener Sportclub	24	15	4	5	45	24	+21	34
2	Hakoah Vienna	24	12	8	4	48	32	+16	32
3	SK Rapid Wien	24	14	3	7	72	46	+26	31
4	SV Amateure	24	13	3	8	59	39	+20	29
5	SC Wacker	24	11	4	9	38	35	+3	26
6	ASV Hertha	24	9	5	10	34	41	−7	23
7	Wiener AF	24	9	3	12	38	52	−14	21
8	First Vienna FC	24	8	4	12	44	47	−3	20
9	SK Admira Wien	24	8	4	12	45	62	−17	20
10	Floridsdorfer AC	24	7	6	11	47	52	−5	20
11	SC Rudolfshügel	24	6	8	10	33	37	−4	20
12	1. Simmeringer SC	24	7	5	12	38	52	−14	19
13	FC Ostmark	24	6	5	13	32	54	−22	17

Source: rsssf.com

== Results ==
Home \ Away	ADM	AMA	FIR	FLO	HAK	HER	OST	RAP	SIM	RUD	WAK	WAF	SPO
SK Admira Wien		1–2	2–3	5–4	2–4	2–3	1–0	3–1	3–2	1–0	0–3	4–1	1–1
SV Amateure	2–4		4–2	2–2	1–1	3–2	5–1	2–3	3–1	2–2	3–0	6–1	2–3
First Vienna	5–2	1–0		1–2	1–1	0–2	6–1	3–1	0–3	2–3	2–3	1–2	1–4
Floridsdorfer AC	3–3	1–2	1–5		2–2	3–1	0–1	1–1	5–3	1–1	1–0	2–1	1–0
Hakoah Vienna	3–0	6–4	2–1	2–1		2–0	3–2	2–2	3–0	1–1	1–2	0–0	0–1
ASV Hertha	3–0	1–4	2–0	2–1	0–0		1–0	3–4	2–2	1–1	0–2	0–0	1–0
FC Ostmark	3–3	0–1	0–1	2–2	2–5	2–1		5–3	3–2	1–1	0–0	2–1	2–3
SK Rapid Wien	10–2	2–1	4–1	6–4	1–3	1–1	7–1		4–1	1–2	4–0	4–1	1–5
Simmeringer SC	2–2	2–1	1–1	3–2	0–0	2–4	1–1	0–2		3–1	2–1	1–0	0–2
SC Rudolfshügel	3–0	2–1	4–4	0–3	0–1	3–0	1–3	0–1	2–0		2–2	1–3	0–1
SC Wacker	1–0	0–4	1–1	3–2	3–1	2–3	4–0	0–1	3–1	3–2		0–1	2–0
Wiener AF	1–4	0–2	0–1	3–2	3–5	5–1	1–0	2–6	6–3	1–0	3–2		1–1
Wiener Sportclub	2–0	1–2	2–1	3–1	3–0	2–0	1–0	3–2	1–3	1–1	1–1	4–1	

Legend: Blue = home team win; Yellow = draw; Red = away team win.
