= 1941–42 Gauliga Donau-Alpenland =

Gauliga Donau-Alpenland
- Season: 1941–42
- Champions: First Vienna FC
- Relegated: Post SV Wien
- German championship: First Vienna FC

The 1941–42 Gauliga Donau-Alpenland was the fourth season of the Gauliga Donau-Alpenland, formerly the Gauliga Ostmark, the first tier of football in German-annexed Austria from 1938 to 1945.

First Vienna FC won the championship and qualified for the 1942 German football championship, reaching the final where it lost 2–0 to FC Schalke 04.

The Gauliga Ostmark and Gauliga Donau-Alpenland titles from 1938 to 1944, excluding the 1944–45 season which was not completed, are recognised as official Austrian football championships by the Austrian Bundesliga.

== Table ==
The 1941–42 season saw two new clubs in the league, Post SV Wien and SK Sturm Graz. Sturm Graz withdrew in February 1942 but kept its league place for the following season.

Pos	Team	Pld	W	D	L	GF	GA	GD	Pts	Promotion, qualification or relegation
1	First Vienna FC (C)	16	11	3	2	51	26	+25	25	Qualification to German championship
2	FC Wien	16	8	5	3	45	23	+22	21	
3	SK Rapid Wien	16	8	3	5	39	30	+9	19	
4	FK Austria Wien	16	5	7	4	34	25	+9	17	
5	Floridsdorfer AC	16	7	3	6	39	50	−11	17	
6	SC Wacker	16	7	2	7	42	39	+3	16	
7	Wiener Sportclub	16	6	3	7	43	38	+5	15	
8	SK Admira Wien	16	5	3	8	43	40	+3	13	
9	Post SV Wien (R)	16	0	1	15	10	75	−65	1	Relegation

Source: RSSSF.com
Rules for classification: 1) Points
(C) Champions; (R) Relegated

== Results ==
Home \ Away	ADM	AUS	FIR	FLO	POS	RAP	STU	WAK	WIE	SPO
SK Admira Wien		3–2	3–4	1–2	6–2	0–4	1–2	2–3	0–0	2–2
FK Austria Wien	0–7		1–1	3–2	0–0	3–4	6–0	6–0	4–0	3–2
First Vienna FC	5–4	1–1		7–2	6–0	4–1	1–0	2–1	0–4	5–1
Floridsdorfer AC	2–3	1–1	1–0		6–5	2–4		4–4	3–1	2–5
Post SV Wien	0–6	1–5	0–6	0–2		1–3		0–4	0–8	1–4
SK Rapid Wien	1–1	2–2	0–1	10–2	2–0		8–1	2–1	0–4	2–1
SK Sturm Graz		0–2	0–4	3–0	3–1				0–3	
SC Wacker	6–2	1–4	2–3	2–4	4–0	2–0	6–1		2–4	3–2
FC Wien	4–1	1–1	1–2	3–3	4–0	2–2		4–4		3–0
Wiener Sportclub	3–2	1–1	4–4	4–3	9–0	4–2	8–0	0–3	1–2	

Legend: Blue = home team win; Yellow = draw; Red = away team win.
