= 1923–24 Austrian First Class =

13th season of top-tier football league in Austria

Austrian First Class
- Season: 1923–24
- Champions: SV Amateure (1st Austrian title)
- Relegated: ASV Hertha; FC Ostmark; Wiener AF
- Matches: 132
- Goals: 459 (3.48 per match)
- Top goalscorer: Leopold Danis; Rudolf Hanel; Gustav Wieser (16 goals)

The 1923–24 Austrian First Class season was the thirteenth season of top-tier football in Austria. SV Amateure claim their first Austrian title after winning the title by four points over second place First Vienna FC. On the other end of the table, ASV Hertha, FC Ostmark and Wiener AF were all relegated to the second tier of Austrian football.

== League standings ==
Pos	Team	Pld	W	D	L	GF	GA	GD	Pts	Qualification
1	SV Amateure	22	16	4	2	53	19	+34	36	
2	First Vienna FC	22	14	4	4	54	30	+24	32	
3	Wiener Sportclub	22	11	8	3	40	17	+23	30	
4	SK Rapid Wien	22	11	5	6	55	48	+7	27	
5	1. Simmeringer SC	22	9	7	6	46	32	+14	25	
6	Hakoah Vienna	22	8	6	8	41	34	+7	22	
7	SK Admira Wien	22	7	7	8	36	34	+2	21	
8	SC Wacker	22	6	8	8	33	34	−1	20	
9	SK Slovan HAC	22	7	4	11	36	46	−10	18	
10	ASV Hertha	22	4	9	9	22	33	−11	17	Relegated to the Second Class
11	FC Ostmark	22	2	5	15	17	64	−47	9	Relegated to the Second Class
12	Wiener AF	22	1	5	16	26	68	−42	7	Relegated to the Second Class

Source: rsssf.com

== Results ==
Home \ Away	ADM	AMA	FIR	HAK	HER	OST	RAP	SIM	SLO	WAK	WAF	SPO
SK Admira Wien		1–3	1–3	2–1	1–1	6–2	1–2	1–2	2–3	1–1	1–1	2–0
SV Amateure	4–2		0–2	3–1	2–1	0–0	2–2	2–1	2–0	1–0	4–0	2–0
First Vienna	1–0	1–1		2–1	2–2	7–2	5–1	2–1	2–1	1–3	4–3	2–0
Hakoah Vienna	0–1	0–3	1–3		4–1	4–0	3–0	3–2	2–2	1–3	3–1	1–1
ASV Hertha	1–4	1–3	1–0	0–0		1–1	3–4	0–0	2–0	2–1	2–0	0–3
FC Ostmark	2–2	1–6	1–5	0–3	0–0		0–3	0–1	1–0	1–4	2–2	0–1
SK Rapid Wien	2–0	3–1	3–1	2–2	3–2	3–2		1–1	6–4	2–2	7–1	0–3
Simmeringer SC	1–1	1–3	2–2	1–1	1–0	7–1	4–2		4–6	5–1	2–1	2–2
SK Slovan HAC	0–1	0–3	0–4	4–2	0–0	4–0	3–2	0–5		1–1	2–1	0–1
SC Wacker	1–1	0–2	2–3	0–1	0–0	0–1	4–2	2–1	3–3		2–2	1–3
Wiener AF	2–4	1–5	2–2	2–6	2–2	2–0	2–3	0–1	0–3	0–2		1–4
Wiener Sportclub	1–1	1–1	2–0	1–1	2–0	3–0	2–2	1–1	2–0	0–0	7–0	

Legend: Blue = home team win; Yellow = draw; Red = away team win.
