= 1912–13 Austrian First Class =

2nd season of top-tier football league in Austria

Austrian First Class
- Season: 1912–13
- Champions: SK Rapid Wien (2nd Austrian title)
- Matches played: 90
- Goals scored: 346 (3.84 per match)

The 1912–13 Austrian First Class season was the second season of top-tier football in Austria. It was won by SK Rapid Wien, with a seven-point lead over second-placed Wiener AF.

== League standings ==
Pos	Team	Pld	W	D	L	GF	GA	GD	Pts
1	SK Rapid Wien	18	15	3	0	59	17	+42	33
2	Wiener AF	18	12	2	4	39	21	+18	26
3	Wiener Sportclub	18	10	1	7	45	24	+21	21
4	SV Amateure	18	9	1	8	39	31	+8	19
5	Wiener AC	18	8	3	7	41	28	+13	19
6	1. Simmeringer SC	18	7	1	10	29	53	−24	15
7	SC Rudolfshügel	18	6	3	9	19	44	−25	15
8	First Vienna FC	18	5	3	10	19	37	−18	13
9	Floridsdorfer AC	18	5	3	10	25	49	−24	13
10	ASV Hertha	18	3	0	15	31	42	−11	6

Source: rsssf.com

== Results ==
Home \ Away	AMA	FIR	FLO	HER	RAP	RUD	SIM	WAC	WAF	SPO
SV Amateure		2–0	0–1	3–0	1–4	1–2	7–1	3–1	2–4	2–0
First Vienna	2–1		1–1	0–2	1–2	0–0	1–3	1–0	1–2	0–2
Floridsdorfer AC	1–3	4–3		2–3	1–3	2–2	1–1	0–4	2–3	0–7
ASV Hertha	1–1	5–1	1–2		2–4	1–0	0–4	4–3	2–3	1–4
SK Rapid Wien	3–0	1–1	5–0	2–1		4–1	7–0	4–3	2–1	5–0
SC Rudolfshügel	1–6	0–1	2–1	0–4	0–5		5–1	1–4	1–0	3–2
Simmeringer SC	5–2	1–4	1–3	2–1	2–4	3–0		0–5	1–0	1–4
Wiener AC	1–2	5–1	4–2	3–2	1–1	0–0	1–2		1–1	1–2
Wiener AF	2–1	2–0	2–0	2–0	2–2	4–1	6–1	2–3		1–0
Wiener Sportclub	2–2	4–1	4–2	6–1	0–1	5–0	2–0	0–1	1–2	

Source: Almanacco Illustrato del Calcio - La Storia 1898-2004, Panini Edizioni, Modena, September 2005 (in Italian)
Legend: Blue = home team win; Yellow = draw; Red = away team win.
