= 1913–14 Austrian First Class =

3rd season of top-tier football league in Austria

Austrian First Class
- Season: 1913–14
- Champions: Wiener AF (1st Austrian title)
- Relegated: First Vienna FC
- Matches played: 90
- Goals scored: 373 (4.14 per match)

The 1913–14 Austrian First Class season was the third season of top-tier football in Austria. It was won by Wiener AF as they won more games than SK Rapid Wien

== League standings ==
Pos	Team	Pld	W	D	L	GF	GA	GD	Pts
1	Wiener AF	18	12	3	3	54	34	+20	27
2	SK Rapid Wien	18	11	5	2	51	26	+25	27
3	Wiener AC	18	8	7	3	51	27	+24	23
4	Wiener Sportclub	18	9	4	5	40	29	+11	22
5	SV Amateure	18	7	3	8	34	43	−9	17
6	1. Simmeringer SC	18	6	4	8	38	42	−4	16
7	SC Rudolfshügel	18	5	6	7	25	36	−11	16
8	Floridsdorfer AC	18	4	5	9	32	43	−11	13
9	ASV Hertha	18	2	7	9	27	44	−17	11
10	First Vienna FC	18	3	2	13	21	49	−28	8

Source: rsssf.com

== Results ==
Home \ Away	AMA	FIR	FLO	HER	RAP	RUD	SIM	WAC	WAF	SPO
SV Amateure		5–1	0–5	1–1	1–2	1–1	3–2	0–5	0–5	3–1
First Vienna	1–3		2–4	1–2	0–5	1–2	2–0	2–5	1–2	3–1
Floridsdorfer AC	0–2	1–2		1–1	2–2	1–0	2–2	1–1	2–3	1–3
ASV Hertha	2–4	3–0	2–2		2–3	1–1	1–3	1–5	3–3	0–3
SK Rapid Wien	4–0	3–1	7–2	4–2		6–4	4–2	2–2	2–2	2–0
SC Rudolfshügel	2–1	2–2	2–1	0–0	0–1		3–1	2–1	2–4	0–2
Simmeringer SC	2–4	3–0	1–5	3–3	2–1	1–1		3–5	3–2	2–2
Wiener AC	2–2	2–0	7–0	5–1	1–1	1–1	1–2		2–1	2–2
Wiener AF	5–3	5–1	5–4	2–1	1–1	6–0	2–1	2–0		0–3
Wiener Sportclub	2–1	1–1	2–0	3–1	2–1	5–1	1–5	4–4	3–2	

Source: Almanacco Illustrato del Calcio - La Storia 1898-2004, Panini Edizioni, Modena, September 2005 (in Italian)
Legend: Blue = home team win; Yellow = draw; Red = away team win.
