= 1961–62 Austrian football championship =

44th season of top-tier football league in Austria

Austrian Staatsliga
- Season: 1961–62
- Champions: FK Austria Wien

Statistics of Austrian Staatsliga in the 1961–62 season.

== Overview ==
It was contested by 14 teams, and FK Austria Wien won the championship.

== League standings ==
| Pos | Team | Pld | W | D | L | GF | GA | GD | Pts |
|---|---|---|---|---|---|---|---|---|---|
| 1 | FK Austria Wien | 26 | 19 | 4 | 3 | 65 | 23 | +42 | 42 |
| 2 | Linzer ASK | 26 | 16 | 6 | 4 | 69 | 40 | +29 | 38 |
| 3 | SK Admira Wien Energie | 26 | 16 | 4 | 6 | 56 | 34 | +22 | 36 |
| 4 | Wiener Sportclub | 26 | 12 | 8 | 6 | 58 | 39 | +19 | 32 |
| 5 | SK Rapid Wien | 26 | 12 | 7 | 7 | 58 | 32 | +26 | 31 |
| 6 | Wiener AC | 26 | 11 | 5 | 10 | 47 | 37 | +10 | 27 |
| 7 | Grazer AK | 26 | 10 | 7 | 9 | 43 | 42 | +1 | 27 |
| 8 | SVS Linz | 26 | 10 | 6 | 10 | 47 | 50 | −3 | 26 |
| 9 | 1. Simmeringer SC | 26 | 7 | 10 | 9 | 37 | 62 | −25 | 24 |
| 10 | 1. Schwechater SC | 26 | 9 | 5 | 12 | 50 | 68 | −18 | 23 |
| 11 | First Vienna FC | 26 | 8 | 5 | 13 | 44 | 44 | 0 | 21 |
| 12 | Kapfenberger SV | 26 | 5 | 6 | 15 | 29 | 53 | −24 | 16 |
| 13 | 1. Wiener Neustädter SC | 26 | 4 | 5 | 17 | 30 | 57 | −27 | 13 |
| 14 | Salzburger AK | 26 | 1 | 6 | 19 | 27 | 79 | −52 | 8 |

Source: rsssf.com

== Results ==
| Home \ Away | ADM | AWI | FIR | GAK | KAP | LIN | RWI | SAL | SCH | SIM | SLI | WAC | WNE | WIE |
|---|---|---|---|---|---|---|---|---|---|---|---|---|---|---|
| Admira Wien Energie | | 2–1 | 2–1 | 3–1 | 2–1 | 3–4 | 0–4 | 4–0 | 1–1 | 4–0 | 2–1 | 1–1 | 4–1 | 0–0 |
| Austria Wien | 4–0 | | 1–1 | 1–5 | 5–1 | 4–0 | 2–1 | 1–0 | 5–1 | 2–2 | 3–1 | 2–0 | 2–0 | 3–0 |
| First Vienna | 3–0 | 0–1 | | 3–1 | 1–4 | 3–3 | 1–1 | 4–0 | 1–0 | 1–1 | 0–1 | 0–1 | 2–2 | 1–2 |
| Grazer AK | 2–2 | 1–3 | 1–0 | | 6–1 | 1–4 | 1–0 | 1–0 | 0–2 | 2–1 | 4–1 | 0–2 | 1–3 | 3–3 |
| Kapfenberger SV | 1–2 | 0–0 | 1–3 | 0–1 | | 0–0 | 0–5 | 2–2 | 2–3 | 1–3 | 0–1 | 1–3 | 0–1 | 0–2 |
| Linzer ASK | 2–1 | 1–2 | 3–1 | 3–0 | 6–1 | | 2–0 | 3–0 | 4–0 | 2–2 | 5–1 | 2–0 | 1–0 | 1–3 |
| Rapid Wien | 0–1 | 0–2 | 4–2 | 2–1 | 1–1 | 3–3 | | 2–0 | 2–1 | 2–0 | 1–2 | 1–1 | 1–1 | 2–2 |
| Salzburger AK | 1–3 | 1–7 | 0–4 | 3–3 | 0–2 | 0–2 | 1–1 | | 0–4 | 2–2 | 2–3 | 2–5 | 1–5 | 1–1 |
| 1. Schwechater SC | 2–6 | 3–2 | 3–2 | 1–1 | 3–3 | 1–3 | 2–3 | 5–2 | | 2–1 | 2–2 | 3–1 | 0–3 | 0–1 |
| Simmeringer SC | 2–1 | 0–4 | 3–2 | 1–1 | 2–2 | 0–2 | 0–7 | 2–0 | 2–2 | | 1–1 | 2–0 | 2–1 | 1–10 |
| SVS Linz | 0–2 | 0–3 | 2–4 | 2–2 | 0–1 | 6–4 | 1–2 | 3–3 | 7–1 | 1–4 | | 0–0 | 3–0 | 4–1 |
| Wiener AC | 0–1 | 1–1 | 3–2 | 1–2 | 0–1 | 4–4 | 2–3 | 2–0 | 6–2 | 7–0 | 3–1 | | 1–0 | 0–3 |
| Wiener Neustädter SC | 0–5 | 1–2 | 0–2 | 0–2 | 0–3 | 1–2 | 1–7 | 3–4 | 2–4 | 1–1 | 1–1 | 1–2 | | 1–3 |
| Wiener SC | 1–4 | 1–2 | 4–0 | 0–0 | 1–0 | 3–3 | 1–4 | 5–2 | 6–2 | 2–2 | 0–1 | 2–1 | 1–1 | |

Legend: Blue = home team win; Yellow = draw; Red = away team win.
