= 1965–66 Austrian football championship =

48th season of top-tier football league in Austria

Austrian Nationalliga
- Season: 1965–66
- Champions: SK Admira Wien

Statistics of Austrian Nationalliga in the 1965–66 season.

== Overview ==
It was contested by 14 teams, and SK Admira Wien won the championship.

== League standings ==
Pos	Team	Pld	W	D	L	GF	GA	GD	Pts
1	SK Admira Wien	26	18	7	1	51	17	+34	43
2	SK Rapid Wien	26	16	8	2	64	22	+42	40
3	FK Austria Wien	26	16	3	7	58	27	+31	35
4	Wiener Sportclub	26	11	8	7	57	33	+24	30
5	Austria Klagenfurt	26	11	7	8	39	33	+6	29
6	First Vienna FC	26	11	7	8	53	49	+4	29
7	Linzer ASK	26	10	7	9	45	37	+8	27
8	FC Wacker Innsbruck	26	8	9	9	32	31	+1	25
9	1. Schwechater SC	26	9	5	12	40	42	−2	23
10	Grazer AK	26	7	9	10	35	46	−11	23
11	Kapfenberger SV	26	5	10	11	26	51	−25	20
12	1. Wiener Neustädter SC	26	7	5	14	30	60	−30	19
13	SV Austria Salzburg	26	3	6	17	26	66	−40	12
14	1. Simmeringer SC	26	3	3	20	26	68	−42	9

Source: rsssf.com

== Results ==
Home \ Away	ADM	KLA	ASZ	AWI	FIR	GAK	KAP	LIN	RAP	SCH	SIM	WKR	WNE	WIE
Admira Wien		3–1	2–1	3–1	2–0	0–1	0–0	1–0	1–1	3–1	1–0	0–0	8–1	2–1
Austria Klagenfurt	0–2		0–0	3–1	6–3	2–0	1–1	1–1	0–1	0–1	2–0	2–0	1–1	1–0
Austria Salzburg	0–0	1–4		1–6	1–1	0–0	0–1	1–4	1–6	0–1	0–1	0–0	1–2	2–5
Austria Wien	3–4	3–1	6–1		1–2	4–0	3–1	3–0	2–3	3–1	1–0	2–1	3–1	2–0
First Vienna	0–0	3–1	4–1	3–2		3–2	0–1	3–5	0–0	2–0	4–1	1–0	4–1	4–4
Grazer AK	0–1	1–1	0–3	0–2	0–0		4–4	2–0	0–4	2–1	3–0	2–2	2–2	0–0
Kapfenberger SV	2–5	1–2	1–4	0–0	2–1	1–3		0–4	0–2	0–0	4–4	0–0	1–2	2–1
Linzer ASK	2–2	3–2	5–1	0–1	2–4	3–1	0–0		0–2	1–1	0–1	0–0	3–0	0–3
Rapid Wien	1–2	4–1	1–1	1–0	4–2	2–2	0–0	3–0		3–1	4–0	1–1	1–3	1–1
1. Schwechater SC	1–2	0–0	5–2	1–1	4–1	3–0	5–3	1–2	1–6		3–1	0–2	1–0	2–3
Simmeringer SC	0–4	0–1	1–2	0–3	1–5	4–2	0–1	1–4	1–3	2–2		1–2	0–1	1–3
Wacker Innsbruck	0–0	0–2	3–0	0–0	1–1	1–2	6–0	2–5	0–3	1–0	5–2		2–0	2–1
Wiener Neustädter SC	0–1	1–2	2–0	0–4	6–1	1–4	0–0	0–0	0–5	0–4	3–3	3–1		0–4
Wiener SC	0–2	2–2	5–2	0–1	1–1	2–2	4–0	1–1	2–2	2–0	5–1	3–0	4–0	

Legend: Blue = home team win; Yellow = draw; Red = away team win.
