= 1955–56 Austrian football championship =

38th season of top-tier football league in Austria

Austrian football championship
- Season: 1955–56
- Champions: Rapid Wein

The 1955–56 Austrian Staatsliga A was the 45th edition of top flight football in Austria.

== Overview ==
It was contested by 14 teams, and Rapid Wien won the championship.

== League standings ==
Pos	Team	Pld	W	D	L	GF	GA	GD	Pts	Qualification or relegation
1	SK Rapid Wien (C)	26	20	3	3	93	37	+56	43	Qualification for the European Cup preliminary round
2	SC Wacker	26	19	3	4	85	33	+52	41	
3	First Vienna FC	26	18	4	4	96	41	+55	40	
4	FK Austria Wien	26	16	3	7	78	47	+31	35	
5	Wiener Sportclub	26	12	5	9	50	51	−1	29	
6	1. Simmeringer SC	26	10	8	8	68	61	+7	28	
7	Grazer AK	26	11	5	10	59	63	−4	27	
8	SV Austria Salzburg	26	9	5	12	50	65	−15	23	
9	SK Admira Wien	26	7	4	15	54	61	−7	18	
10	SK Sturm Graz	26	5	8	13	43	68	−25	18	
11	Kapfenberger SV	26	7	3	16	39	67	−28	17	
12	FC Stadlau	26	5	5	16	43	74	−31	15	
13	FC Wien	26	5	5	16	31	68	−37	15	
14	ESV Austria Graz	26	7	1	18	25	78	−53	15	

Source: rsssf.com
(C) Champions

== Results ==
Home \ Away	ADM	AGR	ASZ	AWI	FIR	FCW	GAK	KAP	RWI	SIM	STA	STU	WAK	WIE
Admira Wien		5–1	4–2	3–4	1–2	3–0	2–2	5–2	0–4	1–1	1–2	1–0	2–7	2–3
Austria Graz	4–2		2–3	1–3	0–4	0–0	0–2	2–1	0–7	1–7	1–0	0–5	0–3	2–1
Austria Salzburg	2–1	2–0		2–4	1–6	0–2	3–4	0–5	0–4	2–2	3–2	4–4	1–4	1–2
Austria Wien	2–0	9–1	2–0		2–3	4–1	4–1	2–3	3–5	0–0	2–1	3–1	3–1	6–2
First Vienna	1–0	9–2	4–6	1–1		3–0	3–3	5–1	5–1	2–3	8–1	7–1	3–2	2–0
FC Wien	1–7	1–2	0–3	3–0	2–3		1–5	2–1	2–2	1–1	1–0	1–1	1–8	3–1
Grazer AK	4–1	1–2	0–3	3–4	1–6	4–1		1–1	1–6	0–0	2–2	2–0	0–7	1–3
Kapfenberger SV	4–3	1–0	1–2	2–3	2–1	2–1	1–2		0–6	2–5	0–1	2–3	2–1	0–1
Rapid Wien	5–3	1–0	5–2	3–1	1–4	2–1	5–1	1–0		4–2	4–0	7–1	3–3	2–2
Simmeringer SC	2–1	6–1	0–2	1–6	2–7	6–1	0–1	2–0	1–4		4–2	3–3	1–1	1–5
Stadlau	0–2	2–1	2–2	2–6	3–3	1–1	1–6	8–2	1–2	3–5		2–0	2–6	0–5
Sturm Graz	2–2	0–1	1–1	2–1	2–2	1–0	1–5	3–3	2–3	3–8	3–3		2–4	2–1
Wacker Wien	1–1	1–0	1–0	3–1	3–1	5–3	2–4	6–0	2–0	4–1	3–2	1–0		3–0
Wiener SC	3–1	2–1	3–3	2–2	0–1	3–1	4–3	1–1	0–6	4–4	1–0	1–0	0–3	

Legend: Blue = home team win; Yellow = draw; Red = away team win.
