= 1911–12 Austrian First Class =

1st season of top-tier football league in Austria

Austrian First Class
- Season: 1911–12
- Champions: SK Rapid Wien (1st Austrian title)
- Relegated: Vienna Cricket & FC
- Matches played: 110
- Goals scored: 521 (4.74 per match)

The 1911–12 Austrian First Class season was the first season of top-tier football in Austria. It was won by SK Rapid Wien as they won by a point over Wiener Sportclub.

== League standings ==
Pos	Team	Pld	W	D	L	GF	GA	GD	Pts
1	SK Rapid Wien	20	15	1	4	64	31	+33	31
2	Wiener Sportclub	20	13	4	3	53	35	+18	30
3	Wiener AF	20	13	3	4	59	23	+36	29
4	Wiener AC	20	10	5	5	59	41	+18	25
5	1. Simmeringer SC	20	9	3	8	57	63	−6	21
6	First Vienna FC	20	9	2	9	50	36	+14	20
7	Floridsdorfer AC	20	9	1	10	61	53	+8	19
8	SV Amateure	20	5	5	10	42	51	−9	15
9	ASV Hertha	20	6	2	12	25	50	−25	14
10	SC Rudolfshügel	20	5	4	11	39	42	−3	14
11	Vienna Cricket & FC	20	0	2	18	12	96	−84	2

Source: rsssf.com

== Results ==
Home \ Away	AMA	FIR	FLO	HER	RAP	RUD	SIM	CRI	WAC	WAF	SPO
SV Amateure		2–1	2–3	1–3	1–4	2–2	3–4	3–1	4–0	0–1	2–2
First Vienna	6–1		2–1	4–0	0–3	2–0	5–0	8–0	2–2	0–3	0–1
Floridsdorfer AC	2–8	5–0		4–1	2–4	5–3	5–1	7–1	6–3	1–3	1–2
ASV Hertha	3–2	3–4*	1–0		1–3	0–1	2–2	3–0	1–2	1–2	1–3
SK Rapid Wien	3–0	4–2	9–2	3–1		1–2	3–4	3–1	2–1	1–1	5–1
SC Rudolfshügel	2–2	1–3	0–1	7–0	1–3		2–2	6–0	3–3	2–3	1–2
Simmeringer SC	3–4	6–0	4–3	3–1	5–2	3–1		7–1	3–3	3–5	2–4
Vienna Cricket & FC	1–1	0–7	0–8	0–2	0–3	2–4	1–3		1–2	0–2	1–4
Wiener AC	3–1	1–2	3–2	0–0	4–3	1–0	5–1	14–0		3–1	3–6
Wiener AF	5–1	2–1	1–1	5–0	1–2	3–0	9–0	8–1	2–2		1–2
Wiener Sportclub	2–2	1–1	6–2	4–2	1–3	4–1	4–1	1–1	1–4	2–1	

Source: Almanacco Illustrato del Calcio - La Storia 1898-2004, Panini Edizioni, Modena, September 2005 (in Italian)
Legend: Blue = home team win; Yellow = draw; Red = away team win.
- ASV Hertha-First Vienna ended 3-4, but the match was awarded 4-3 as First Vienna fielded an ineligible player
