= 1951–52 Austrian football championship =

34th season of top-tier football league in Austria

Austrian football championship
- Season: 1951–52

The 1951–52 Austrian Staatsliga A was the 41st edition of top flight Football in Austria.

== Overview ==
It was contested by 14 teams, and Rapid Wien won the championship.

== League standings ==
Pos	Team	Pld	W	D	L	GF	GA	GD	Pts
1	SK Rapid Wien	26	20	1	5	107	39	+68	41
2	FK Austria Wien	26	18	3	5	95	40	+55	39
3	First Vienna FC	26	14	4	8	71	52	+19	32
4	SC Wacker	26	14	3	9	84	55	+29	31
5	SK Admira Wien	26	13	5	8	71	55	+16	31
6	Grazer AK	26	13	3	10	66	48	+18	29
7	Linzer ASK	26	10	5	11	42	54	−12	25
8	SK Sturm Graz	26	11	3	12	42	56	−14	25
9	Floridsdorfer AC	26	10	4	12	56	70	−14	24
10	FC Wien	26	10	2	14	42	55	−13	22
11	1. Simmeringer SC	26	9	4	13	40	58	−18	22
12	Wiener Sportclub	26	7	3	16	34	69	−35	17
13	Kapfenberger SV	26	6	1	19	31	66	−35	13
14	Favoritner SK Blau Weiß	26	5	3	18	25	89	−64	13

Source: rsssf.com

== Results ==
Home \ Away	ADM	AWI	FAV	FIR	FLO	FCW	GAK	KAP	LIN	RWI	SIM	STU	WAK	WIE
Admira Wien		0–4	2–0	1–3	2–0	2–0	4–6	3–0	3–3	1–3	5–1	6–0	5–5	5–0
Austria Wien	3–4		9–0	4–0	2–3	7–3	3–2	1–1	10–2	5–3	2–0	4–2	2–3	5–1
Favoritner SK Blau Weiß	3–6	1–6		0–5	2–0	2–4	0–6	1–0	1–1	0–6	2–0	1–0	0–9	0–2
First Vienna	5–1	2–1	2–2		2–2	2–2	2–1	6–1	1–4	5–2	2–1	3–1	5–1	3–4
Floridsdorfer AC	1–2	0–4	4–1	4–2		2–1	2–2	5–1	3–3	3–2	2–1	4–2	2–5	1–0
FC Wien	1–1	0–1	3–0	2–3	2–0		1–4	3–1	2–1	2–5	2–0	0–1	1–3	1–0
Grazer AK	2–2	1–5	1–2	1–2	4–2	4–1		2–0	3–0	3–0	3–0	4–1	1–5	3–0
Kapfenberger SV	3–1	0–2	2–0	3–6	4–3	0–1	1–0		5–1	0–4	1–3	2–3	0–6	3–0
Linzer ASK	1–0	1–1	1–1	2–1	2–0	4–1	2–1	1–0		2–3	0–1	2–0	2–1	0–1
Rapid Wien	2–1	3–1	5–0	2–2	10–1	3–1	6–0	4–0	5–2		5–1	7–1	2–3	10–3
Simmeringer SC	1–1	1–2	4–2	3–2	3–1	4–2	1–1	5–1	4–0	1–4		1–1	1–0	3–3
Sturm Graz	2–3	1–2	4–3	1–0	2–2	4–0	2–1	3–2	2–1	0–4	6–0		0–0	1–0
Wacker Wien	4–6	3–6	6–1	6–2	9–6	0–1	0–4	1–0	3–2	1–3	5–0	3–0		1–1
Wiener SC	2–4	3–3	1–0	0–3	0–3	1–5	4–6	1–0	1–2	0–4	3–0	1–2	2–1	

Legend: Blue = home team win; Yellow = draw; Red = away team win.
