= 1949–50 Austrian football championship =

32nd season of top-tier football league in Austria

Austrian football championship
- Season: 1949–50

Statistics of Austrian Staatsliga A in the 1949–50 season.

== Overview ==
It was contested by 13 teams, and FK Austria Wien won the championship.

== League standings ==
Pos	Team	Pld	W	D	L	GF	GA	GD	Pts
1	FK Austria Wien	24	18	2	4	92	37	+55	38
2	SK Rapid Wien	24	16	4	4	87	43	+44	36
3	SC Wacker	24	15	3	6	76	34	+42	33
4	First Vienna FC	24	14	5	5	60	45	+15	33
5	SK Admira Wien	24	16	0	8	70	48	+22	32
6	FC Wien	24	14	4	6	64	45	+19	32
7	Wiener Sportclub	24	12	4	8	55	45	+10	28
8	Floridsdorfer AC	24	9	2	13	46	50	−4	20
9	SK Vorwärts Steyr	24	9	2	13	47	65	−18	20
10	SK Sturm Graz	24	7	4	13	50	58	−8	18
11	SV Gloggnitz	24	4	3	17	49	104	−55	11
12	SK Slovan	24	2	5	17	31	71	−40	9
13	SC Rapid Oberlaa	24	0	2	22	23	105	−82	2

Source: rsssf.com

== Results ==
Home \ Away	ADM	AWI	FIR	FLO	FCW	GLO	ROB	RWI	SLO	STU	VOR	WAK	WIN
Admira Wien		2–4	1–2	2–1	3–1	4–3	5–1	5–2	4–2	4–1	3–2	2–1	2–4
Austria Wien	5–1		4–1	6–1	8–1	9–1	7–2	4–4	2–1	1–0	5–0	1–4	3–0
First Vienna	4–2	1–4		1–1	4–2	6–0	3–2	0–2	2–2	0–0	3–1	3–2	3–1
Floridsdorfer AC	2–3	2–5	1–3		1–2	2–2	3–0	0–3	5–1	5–1	5–0	1–3	2–1
FC Wien	2–1	2–1	2–2	5–2		1–1	3–1	1–1	4–0	3–0	3–2	0–3	0–1
Gloggnitz	3–8	2–3	2–3	1–3	1–5		5–1	2–8	4–1	3–2	2–5	1–8	2–2
Rapid Oberlaa	0–3	0–3	1–3	1–3	1–9	1–5		0–6	1–3	1–2	1–4	0–1	2–2
Rapid Wien	4–2	4–2	6–0	2–1	2–5	2–1	8–2		5–2	6–0	4–2	3–1	1–4
Slovan Wien	0–2	2–2	1–4	1–2	2–4	5–2	2–2	1–1		2–2	0–3	1–5	0–4
Sturm Graz	0–1	2–3	1–6	3–1	2–3	5–0	8–1	3–3	3–0		4–2	2–3	4–2
Vorwärts Steyr	1–3	0–6	0–2	2–0	2–1	6–3	5–1	3–2	2–1	2–2		1–1	1–2
Wacker Wien	3–1	1–2	4–1	2–1	2–2	10–1	5–0	2–5	2–0	3–2	8–1		1–1
Wiener SC	0–6	3–2	3–3	0–1	2–3	4–2	7–1	0–3	4–1	3–1	3–0	2–1	

Legend: Blue = home team win; Yellow = draw; Red = away team win.
