= 1918–19 Austrian First Class =

8th season of top-tier football league in Austria

Austrian First Class
- Season: 1918–19
- Champions: SK Rapid Wien (5th Austrian title)
- Matches played: 90
- Goals scored: 374 (4.16 per match)
- Top goalscorer: Johann Fröhler; Josef Uridil (14 goals)

The 1918–19 Austrian First Class season was the eighth season of top-tier football in Austria. It was won by SK Rapid Wien by seven points over SC Rudolfshügel.

== League standings ==
Pos	Team	Pld	W	D	L	GF	GA	GD	Pts
1	SK Rapid Wien	18	15	1	2	67	15	+52	31
2	SC Rudolfshügel	18	10	4	4	51	32	+19	24
3	Wiener AC	18	8	7	3	42	26	+16	23
4	Wiener AF	18	8	4	6	32	26	+6	20
5	Wiener Sportclub	18	8	3	7	25	38	−13	19
6	SV Amateure	18	5	6	7	29	38	−9	16
7	Floridsdorfer AC	18	7	1	10	45	35	+10	15
8	ASV Hertha	18	5	2	11	34	52	−18	12
9	1. Simmeringer SC	18	4	4	10	29	63	−34	12
10	SC Wacker	18	2	4	12	20	49	−29	8

Source: rsssf.com

== Results ==
Home \ Away	AMA	FLO	HER	RAP	RUD	SIM	WAK	WAC	WAF	SPO
SV Amateure		0–5	4–0	0–2	3–0	1–1	4–0	0–2	1–1	4–1
Floridsdorfer AC	8–2		7–3	0–1	0–2	5–1	4–1	2–2	2–3	2–3
ASV Hertha	5–2	2–1		1–2	2–5	1–2	1–3	2–2	1–4	4–1
SK Rapid Wien	1–2	4–0	8–1		7–1	3–0	8–0	4–2	3–1	1–2
SC Rudolfshügel	4–0	1–0	3–2	0–3		5–0	2–2	3–3	0–0	3–0
Simmeringer SC	2–2	1–4	2–2	2–9	2–7		0–0	1–3	1–7	2–4
SC Wacker	2–2	0–1	2–3	0–3	3–4	2–5		1–1	2–0	0–2
Wiener AC	2–0	2–1	1–3	2–2	1–1	6–1	5–1		2–3	4–0
Wiener AF	0–0	5–2	2–1	0–3	3–2	0–3	3–1	0–1		0–0
Wiener Sportclub	2–2	2–1	1–0	1–3	1–8	2–3	1–0	1–1	1–0	

Legend: Blue = home team win; Yellow = draw; Red = away team win.
