= 1956–57 Austrian football championship =

39th season of top-tier football league in Austria

Austrian football championship
- Season: 1956–57
- Champions: Rapid Wein

The 1956–57 Austrian Staatsliga A was the 46th edition of top flight football in Austria.

== Overview ==
It was contested by 14 teams, and Rapid Wien won the championship.

== League standings ==
Pos	Team	Pld	W	D	L	GF	GA	GD	Pts
1	SK Rapid Wien	26	19	2	5	100	43	+57	40
2	First Vienna FC	26	17	5	4	71	32	+39	39
3	FK Austria Wien	26	18	2	6	68	41	+27	38
4	SC Wacker	26	14	7	5	82	37	+45	35
5	1. Simmeringer SC	26	11	9	6	67	60	+7	31
6	Grazer AK	26	12	2	12	47	55	−8	26
7	Kapfenberger SV	26	11	3	12	56	74	−18	25
8	SK Admira Wien	26	9	4	13	52	57	−5	22
9	Kremser SC	26	9	4	13	53	79	−26	22
10	Wiener Sportclub	26	9	3	14	50	46	+4	21
11	Wiener AC	26	8	5	13	58	62	−4	21
12	SK Sturm Graz	26	9	3	14	48	66	−18	21
13	SV Austria Salzburg	26	6	3	17	55	83	−28	15
14	FC Stadlau	26	2	4	20	26	98	−72	8

Source: rsssf.com

== Results ==
Home \ Away	ADM	ASZ	AWI	FIR	GAK	KAP	KRE	RWI	SIM	STA	STU	WAK	WAC	WIE
Admira Wien		5–1	1–0	2–1	1–2	4–0	1–1	2–6	2–2	2–3	3–2	2–2	5–2	2–0
Austria Salzburg	2–1		0–2	3–8	1–2	2–3	1–3	4–5	4–2	5–0	1–2	3–3	0–8	2–6
Austria Wien	6–2	4–2		0–3	4–0	5–2	0–2	2–3	3–2	4–0	3–1	2–1	3–2	1–0
First Vienna	3–0	2–0	3–3		1–0	5–2	1–0	2–3	2–2	1–1	4–0	1–1	1–0	4–2
Grazer AK	2–0	1–3	0–2	2–1		1–1	0–2	1–5	2–3	2–0	6–1	0–4	1–0	2–1
Kapfenberger SV	3–2	3–2	0–2	2–4	4–0		6–0	1–8	2–2	5–0	2–0	0–14	2–4	0–1
Kremser SC	2–0	3–8	4–3	2–6	2–3	2–2		1–12	4–4	2–3	4–1	2–5	2–2	0–5
Rapid Wien	2–1	6–1	4–1	1–4	1–1	3–4	2–0		1–1	4–2	0–1	0–1	7–4	3–1
Simmeringer SC	4–0	2–1	2–2	1–4	0–4	4–1	4–2	1–2		6–4	4–3	3–2	4–1	2–2
Stadlau	0–3	3–3	0–5	0–3	1–9	1–4	1–5	1–9	2–3		1–5	1–5	1–1	1–4
Sturm Graz	5–3	0–0	2–3	3–2	2–3	4–2	3–2	1–5	3–5	0–0		2–2	0–2	0–1
Wacker Wien	2–5	5–2	2–3	1–1	2–1	2–0	5–1	4–2	3–0	2–0	7–0		4–0	1–1
Wiener AC	1–1	3–2	3–4	1–3	5–0	1–3	0–3	1–4	2–2	4–0	0–4	2–2		6–2
Wiener SC	3–2	2–1	0–1	0–1	8–2	1–2	1–2	0–2	2–2	2–0	1–3	3–0	2–3	

Legend: Blue = home team win; Yellow = draw; Red = away team win.
