= 1953–54 Austrian football championship =

36th season of top-tier football league in Austria

Austrian football championship
- Season: 1953–54
- Champions: Rapid Wien

The 1953–54 Austrian Staatsliga A was the 43rd edition of top flight football in Austria.

== Overview ==
It was contested by 14 teams, and Rapid Wien won the championship.

== League standings ==
Pos	Team	Pld	W	D	L	GF	GA	GD	Pts
1	SK Rapid Wien	26	18	5	3	96	43	+53	41
2	FK Austria Wien	26	16	6	4	73	43	+30	38
3	SC Wacker	26	12	7	7	72	42	+30	31
4	Grazer AK	26	14	3	9	60	52	+8	31
5	First Vienna FC	26	13	4	9	74	44	+30	30
6	SK Admira Wien	26	12	6	8	55	46	+9	30
7	Wiener Sportclub	26	11	7	8	61	59	+2	29
8	Linzer ASK	26	10	7	9	51	42	+9	27
9	SV Austria Salzburg	26	9	5	12	43	67	−24	23
10	1. Simmeringer SC	26	7	8	11	41	43	−2	22
11	FC Wien	26	8	5	13	40	62	−22	21
12	Wiener AC	26	9	0	17	42	69	−27	18
13	SK Sturm Graz	26	6	4	16	48	69	−21	16
14	Floridsdorfer AC	26	2	3	21	33	108	−75	7

Source: rsssf.com

== Results ==
Home \ Away	ADM	ASZ	AWI	FIR	FLO	FCW	GAK	LIN	RWI	SIM	STU	WAK	WAC	WIE
Admira Wien		2–3	2–3	1–3	4–3	2–2	0–1	0–0	1–1	0–0	3–2	3–2	2–0	5–3
Austria Salzburg	1–1		2–2	1–1	1–3	2–0	2–1	2–2	1–5	1–3	5–2	1–0	2–0	2–2
Austria Wien	3–5	2–3		2–0	2–2	3–2	4–3	2–1	0–3	4–1	5–1	3–2	3–1	5–2
First Vienna	2–2	5–0	0–2		7–1	7–3	1–3	1–0	2–2	1–2	5–2	3–1	7–0	1–2
Floridsdorfer AC	0–2	2–3	0–6	1–1		0–3	2–3	0–7	2–4	0–6	5–4	0–6	1–3	3–4
FC Wien	1–3	5–2	1–1	0–5	2–2		3–0	0–3	2–7	1–1	0–2	2–3	0–2	2–1
Grazer AK	4–3	3–2	2–1	0–4	3–0	7–0		0–5	1–4	0–0	4–3	2–3	4–0	3–2
Linzer ASK	1–3	3–0	2–2	5–3	5–1	0–1	0–2		0–5	0–0	2–0	2–3	1–0	1–2
Rapid Wien	3–2	3–1	3–4	4–3	7–0	3–0	3–1	8–0		2–2	4–2	2–2	2–1	1–1
Simmeringer SC	0–2	1–3	1–4	0–3	6–1	1–2	1–2	1–1	2–3		1–3	2–1	2–0	2–2
Sturm Graz	0–2	2–0	1–6	1–2	2–1	1–3	3–3	1–3	4–6	0–2		0–0	7–1	2–1
Wacker Wien	4–2	9–0	0–0	4–2	10–1	1–1	2–1	2–2	1–5	2–2	1–1		1–2	4–2
Wiener AC	4–1	4–0	1–2	1–2	3–2	1–3	1–4	2–4	5–4	3–1	2–0	0–5		4–5
Wiener SC	0–2	4–3	2–2	4–3	4–0	2–1	3–3	1–1	3–2	2–1	2–2	1–3	4–1	

Legend: Blue = home team win; Yellow = draw; Red = away team win.
