= 1925–26 Austrian First League =

15th season of top-tier football league in Austria

Austrian First League
- Season: 1925–26
- Champions: SV Amateure (2nd Austrian title)
- Relegated: ASV Hertha
- Matches played: 144
- Goals scored: 674 (4.68 per match)
- Top goalscorer: Gustav Wieser (25 goals)

The 1925–26 Austrian First League season was the fifteenth season of the top-tier football in Austria. It was contested by 13 teams which played 144 matches. SV Amateure won their second title as they finished four points ahead of second place First Vienna FC. ASV Hertha finished last and were relegated to the Second League.

== League standings ==
Pos	Team	Pld	W	D	L	GF	GA	GD	Pts	Qualification
1	SV Amateure	24	15	5	4	73	39	+34	35	
2	First Vienna FC	24	14	3	7	61	45	+16	31	
3	1. Simmeringer SC	24	12	5	7	64	52	+12	29	
4	SK Admira Wien	24	12	3	9	49	42	+7	27	
5	SK Rapid Wien	24	12	3	9	61	57	+4	27	
6	SK Slovan HAC	24	11	4	9	56	47	+9	26	
7	Hakoah Vienna	24	9	8	7	56	50	+6	26	
8	Wiener Sportclub	24	11	2	11	45	57	−12	24	
9	SC Wacker	24	8	8	8	51	53	−2	24	
10	Wiener AC	24	8	5	11	42	47	−5	21	
11	Floridsdorfer AC	24	7	5	12	43	53	−10	19	
12	SC Rudolfshügel	24	3	6	15	38	68	−30	12	
13	ASV Hertha	24	3	5	16	35	64	−29	11	Relegated to the Second League

Source: rsssf.com

== Results ==
Home \ Away	ADM	AMA	FIR	FLO	HAK	HER	RAP	RUD	SIM	SLO	WAK	WAC	SPO
SK Admira Wien		3–7	1–0	1–1	2–2	6–2	0–2	3–0	1–2	1–2	1–2	1–2	2–0
SV Amateure	4–2		4–0	2–2	0–1	1–3	5–1	3–1	2–2	4–0	4–1	3–1	6–2
First Vienna	0–1	4–2		4–1	5–4	5–1	2–3	4–1	3–5	1–0	5–4	3–0	3–2
Floridsdorfer AC	0–1	4–3	1–1		2–3	1–2	2–1	4–0	0–2	2–1	2–1	1–4	3–1
Hakoah Vienna	1–3	3–3	1–4	2–1		2–2	1–3	3–2	6–3	5–3	1–1	2–1	2–3
ASV Hertha	1–2	2–4	1–4	1–1	1–1		1–3	1–2	2–5	0–2	1–4	1–1	4–1
SK Rapid Wien	0–1	0–5	1–0	2–0	3–3	4–3		6–4	2–1	4–5	5–3	1–2	5–2
SC Rudolfshügel	3–1	1–1	1–1	3–7	0–4	0–0	1–3		3–3	3–2	1–1	2–4	1–2
Simmeringer SC	3–6	1–2	3–1	4–2	2–2	3–1	3–3	3–2		1–3	4–0	4–2	3–1
SK Slovan HAC	6–3	1–2	6–2	5–0	3–1	1–0	4–4	3–3	1–5		1–1	1–2	2–0
SC Wacker	0–0	3–3	2–4	3–1	1–5	5–2	3–2	3–1	3–1	2–2		1–1	1–1
Wiener AC	2–4	1–2	0–1	2–2	1–1	2–1	3–1	3–1	1–2	0–2	2–4		1–1
Wiener Sportclub	0–3	0–1	2–4	4–3	1–0	4–2	3–2	3–2	3–1	1–0	3–2	5–4	

Legend: Blue = home team win; Yellow = draw; Red = away team win.
