= 1962–63 Austrian football championship =

45th season of top-tier football league in Austria

Austrian Staatsliga
- Season: 1962–63
- Champions: FK Austria Wien

Statistics of Austrian Staatsliga in the 1962–63 season.

== Overview ==
It was contested by 14 teams, and FK Austria Wien won the championship.

== League standings ==
Pos	Team	Pld	W	D	L	GF	GA	GD	Pts
1	FK Austria Wien	26	17	4	5	60	26	+34	38
2	SK Admira Wien Energie	26	15	4	7	46	23	+23	34
3	Wiener Sportclub	26	14	5	7	56	38	+18	33
4	SK Rapid Wien	26	14	4	8	52	28	+24	32
5	Linzer ASK	26	15	1	10	42	38	+4	31
6	1. Schwechater SC	26	11	4	11	49	44	+5	26
7	Wiener AC	26	11	4	11	37	46	−9	26
8	First Vienna FC	26	9	7	10	44	39	+5	25
9	Grazer AK	26	9	5	12	31	41	−10	23
10	1. Simmeringer SC	26	7	7	12	34	46	−12	21
11	SVS Linz	26	8	4	14	34	50	−16	20
12	SV Austria Salzburg	26	9	1	16	31	59	−28	19
13	SC Wacker	26	7	5	14	38	53	−15	19
14	Austria Klagenfurt	26	7	3	16	26	49	−23	17

Source: rsssf.com

== Results ==
Home \ Away	ADM	KLA	ASZ	AWI	FIR	GAK	LIN	RWI	SCH	SIM	SLI	WAK	WAC	WIE
Admira Wien Energie		4–2	4–2	0–0	3–1	3–0	4–0	0–0	3–1	1–0	2–0	1–2	1–2	1–0
Austria Klagenfurt	0–1		3–1	0–4	4–2	1–2	1–0	2–0	1–0	2–1	2–3	1–1	0–0	0–3
Austria Salzburg	0–2	2–1		1–4	2–0	2–1	1–2	1–2	2–0	2–1	1–2	1–1	3–0	2–1
Austria Wien	2–1	2–1	6–0		0–1	7–0	4–1	0–0	6–4	3–1	4–2	2–1	1–0	0–1
First Vienna	2–2	5–0	6–1	3–4		3–4	0–1	2–2	3–1	1–1	4–1	3–1	1–2	1–1
Grazer AK	1–0	1–1	3–0	1–2	1–1		1–1	1–3	1–2	2–1	0–0	3–0	1–0	0–2
Linzer ASK	3–1	1–0	2–1	2–0	2–0	1–0		1–0	1–0	5–0	3–2	1–3	1–2	1–3
Rapid Wien	2–1	4–0	3–1	3–0	0–1	0–1	1–0		2–3	1–0	4–0	1–3	5–1	3–3
1. Schwechater SC	1–2	2–1	3–0	1–1	2–0	1–0	0–1	1–2		3–3	3–1	1–1	1–2	2–1
Simmeringer SC	0–4	1–0	0–1	0–0	0–1	4–2	4–2	4–1	2–2		2–1	0–0	0–0	3–1
SVS Linz	1–0	0–1	1–2	1–2	0–0	0–0	4–2	0–3	2–5	1–0		1–0	2–1	3–0
Wacker Wien	1–3	2–0	2–0	0–2	2–3	0–3	1–2	0–8	4–5	5–0	4–2		0–2	1–3
Wiener AC	0–2	2–0	2–0	0–4	2–0	3–1	2–4	1–2	1–5	3–3	2–1	1–1		2–1
Wiener SC	0–0	5–2	7–2	1–0	0–0	3–1	3–2	1–0	1–0	2–3	3–3	4–2	6–4	

Legend: Blue = home team win; Yellow = draw; Red = away team win.
