= 1933–34 Austrian football championship =

23rd season of top-tier football league in Austria

Austrian football championship
- Season: 1933-34

Statistics of Austrian first league in the 1933–34 season.

== Overview ==
It was contested by 12 teams, and SK Admira Wien won the championship.

== League standings ==
Pos	Team	Pld	W	D	L	GF	GA	GD	Pts
1	SK Admira Wien	22	16	1	5	69	41	+28	33
2	SK Rapid Wien	22	15	1	6	80	34	+46	31
3	FK Austria Wien	22	12	3	7	56	36	+20	27
4	First Vienna FC	22	12	3	7	52	34	+18	27
5	Wiener AC	22	10	2	10	51	64	−13	22
6	FC Wien	22	8	5	9	48	56	−8	21
7	Floridsdorfer AC	22	6	7	9	37	49	−12	19
8	Wiener Sportclub	22	6	6	10	36	41	−5	18
9	SC Wacker	22	6	6	10	49	65	−16	18
10	Hakoah Vienna	22	5	7	10	31	46	−15	17
11	SC Libertas	22	5	6	11	35	56	−21	16
12	SV Donau	22	5	5	12	32	54	−22	15

Source: rsssf.com

== Results ==
Home \ Away	ADM	AUS	DON	FIR	FLO	HAK	LIB	RAP	WAK	WIE	WAC	SPO
SK Admira Wien		1–2	3–3	3–1	3–2	5–2	3–0	0–3	7–2	4–3	3–0	2–1
FK Austria Wien	5–2		0–2	1–0	2–2	5–0	4–0	1–0	4–1	4–2	6–0	4–3
SV Donau	0–1	2–2		0–2	3–2	2–1	2–2	1–8	3–1	1–2	0–1	1–4
First Vienna	1–3	4–1	2–3		5–1	1–1	3–0	2–1	4–2	4–0	4–2	3–0
Floridsdorfer AC	0–5	2–2	2–1	2–0		3–2	1–3	1–4	1–1	2–3	1–3	1–1
Hakoah Vienna	0–2	2–0	2–0	1–3	1–4		1–1	0–2	4–1	2–2	1–0	2–2
SC Libertas	3–1	0–3	1–1	1–4	1–1	1–1		3–6	0–3	1–0	4–5	2–1
SK Rapid Wien	6–2	3–0	5–1	2–0	2–3	5–2	3–3		6–3	3–0	10–0	1–2
SC Wacker	2–5	1–0	5–1	3–3	1–1	4–4	1–4	4–3		0–3	4–1	2–1
FC Wien	2–6	4–2	3–2	2–3	2–3	1–1	3–1	2–1	5–5		2–2	1–0
Wiener AC	2–5	5–3	4–2	2–0	3–1	2–0	5–3	3–4	2–2	7–4		1–2
Wiener Sportclub	1–3	0–5	1–1	3–3	1–1	0–1	4–1	1–2	3–1	2–2	3–1	

Legend: Blue = home team win; Yellow = draw; Red = away team win.
