= 1952–53 Austrian football championship =

35th season of top-tier football league in Austria

Austrian football championship
- Season: 1952–53

The 1952–53 Austrian Staatsliga A was the 42nd edition of top flight football in Austria.

== Overview ==
It was contested by 14 teams, and Austria Wien won the championship for the fifth time in its history.

== League standings ==
Pos	Team	Pld	W	D	L	GF	GA	GD	Pts
1	FK Austria Wien	26	21	3	2	106	38	+68	45
2	SC Wacker	26	20	4	2	101	30	+71	44
3	SK Rapid Wien	26	18	3	5	94	48	+46	39
4	First Vienna FC	26	16	4	6	89	48	+41	36
5	SK Admira	26	11	6	9	65	53	+12	28
6	Floridsdorfer AC	26	12	2	12	56	82	−26	26
7	Grazer AK	26	9	7	10	50	59	−9	25
8	1. Simmeringer SC	26	9	4	13	41	52	−11	22
9	SK Sturm Graz	26	7	8	11	44	59	−15	22
10	Linzer ASK	26	8	3	15	51	59	−8	19
11	FC Wien	26	6	7	13	38	61	−23	19
12	VfB Union Mödling	26	7	5	14	35	62	−27	19
13	Grazer SC	26	6	4	16	45	90	−45	16
14	Salzburger AK 1914	26	1	2	23	33	107	−74	4

Source: rsssf.com

== Results ==
Home \ Away	ADM	AWI	FIR	FLO	FCW	GAK	GRA	LIN	MÖD	RWI	SAL	SIM	STU	WAK
Admira Wien		2–3	1–4	2–1	3–3	1–0	7–2	4–3	4–1	3–1	5–2	2–2	3–3	1–5
Austria Wien	4–2		3–3	3–1	3–2	6–2	3–1	3–2	1–0	2–1	6–0	6–3	2–0	2–1
First Vienna	7–4	5–2		4–1	6–1	2–3	2–1	1–1	3–1	4–2	5–0	5–1	2–1	3–5
Floridsdorfer AC	1–8	2–6	5–4		5–0	2–2	2–1	1–3	2–0	4–12	2–5	2–1	2–2	0–4
FC Wien	0–0	0–9	0–3	1–3		1–1	1–1	0–3	3–2	1–5	3–0	4–1	2–2	0–1
Grazer AK	3–0	1–1	0–1	0–6	1–1		2–2	2–0	4–2	1–5	6–1	1–0	2–0	1–4
Grazer SC	0–5	3–12	1–9	1–2	3–2	4–3		2–2	1–1	1–0	5–1	4–2	1–2	1–4
Linzer ASK	0–1	0–3	1–3	1–2	0–1	3–3	7–1		8–2	0–3	5–3	0–1	3–4	1–4
VfB Union Mödling	0–0	1–10	1–0	0–1	0–2	4–3	3–1	0–3		2–5	1–1	1–0	1–1	1–3
Rapid Wien	2–1	4–1	4–2	4–1	3–1	1–1	6–2	9–0	3–2		4–3	0–2	2–0	3–3
Salzburger AK	2–5	0–7	0–5	2–3	1–6	1–4	2–5	0–2	1–4	3–5		0–2	2–3	1–8
Simmeringer SC	1–0	2–4	2–2	1–3	2–0	3–1	3–0	3–2	0–1	3–4	1–1		1–2	1–5
Sturm Graz	1–1	1–3	3–3	6–2	2–2	1–2	2–0	1–3	0–2	3–3	1–0	1–2		2–7
Wacker Wien	2–0	1–1	4–1	9–0	2–1	7–1	5–1	2–1	2–2	2–3	4–1	1–1	6–0	

Legend: Blue = home team win; Yellow = draw; Red = away team win.
