= 1931–32 Austrian football championship =

21st season of top-tier football league in Austria

Austrian football championship
- Season: 1931-32

Statistics of Austrian first league in season 1931–32.

== Overview ==
It was contested by 12 teams, and SK Admira Wien won the championship.

== League standings ==
Pos	Team	Pld	W	D	L	GF	GA	GD	Pts
1	SK Admira Wien	22	14	5	3	58	26	+32	33
2	First Vienna FC	22	13	5	4	57	27	+30	31
3	SK Rapid Wien	22	15	1	6	70	39	+31	31
4	FK Austria Wien	22	13	3	6	64	39	+25	29
5	Wiener AC	22	9	6	7	45	40	+5	24
6	SC Wacker	22	7	7	8	32	42	−10	21
7	Brigittenauer AC	22	8	5	9	28	43	−15	21
8	SC Nicholson	22	6	7	9	36	43	−7	19
9	Wiener Sportclub	22	5	6	11	41	56	−15	16
10	Hakoah Vienna	22	4	7	11	26	62	−36	15
11	Floridsdorfer AC	22	5	3	14	44	56	−12	13
12	SK Slovan HAC	22	3	5	14	20	48	−28	11

Source: rsssf.com

== Results ==
Home \ Away	ADM	AUS	BRI	FIR	FLO	HAK	NIC	RAP	SLO	WAK	WAC	SPO
SK Admira Wien		4–2	4–0	4–4	1–1	5–0	4–0	2–1	1–1	4–1	2–0	3–0
FK Austria Wien	0–1		2–0	1–3	6–2	6–1	1–1	3–5	1–1	1–1	2–0	4–1
Brigittenauer AC	0–4	1–3		2–1	3–2	1–1	2–1	2–0	1–0	2–1	2–3	1–5
First Vienna	1–0	3–0	2–2		2–0	2–3	4–1	3–0	1–0	3–0	1–1	6–0
Floridsdorfer AC	1–4	5–7	0–1	2–6		9–0	1–1	2–4	2–2	0–2	3–1	1–2
Hakoah Vienna	1–1	2–3	1–1	1–1	0–1		1–3	2–8	1–0	1–1	3–1	1–6
SC Nicholson	0–2	2–3	1–1	2–5	5–0	1–1		4–1	0–2	3–1	2–2	1–1
SK Rapid Wien	3–1	3–2	4–0	2–1	3–2	3–1	2–0		10–0	0–1	1–1	5–4
SK Slovan HAC	0–2	0–4	2–1	0–2	3–2	0–1	2–3	2–3		1–1	2–4	1–2
SC Wacker	2–3	0–6	1–1	4–1	0–4	0–0	3–3	3–2	2–0		1–1	2–2
Wiener AC	5–3	1–3	2–4	1–1	1–0	6–3	4–1	2–4	2–0	2–0		1–1
Wiener Sportclub	3–3	2–4	3–0	1–4	2–4	1–1	0–1	1–6	1–1	2–3	1–3	

Legend: Blue = home team win; Yellow = draw; Red = away team win.
