= 1954–55 Austrian football championship =

37th season of top-tier football league in Austria

Austrian football championship
- Season: 1954–55
- Champions: First Vienna

The 1954–55 Austrian Staatsliga A was the 44th edition of top flight football in Austria.

== Overview ==
It was contested by 14 teams, and First Vienna won the championship for the sixth time in their history.

== League standings ==
Pos	Team	Pld	W	D	L	GF	GA	GD	Pts	Qualification or relegation
1	First Vienna (C)	26	17	5	4	64	26	+38	39	
2	Wiener Sportclub	26	17	5	4	75	40	+35	39	
3	Rapid Wien	26	14	8	4	87	47	+40	36	Qualification for the European Cup first round
4	SC Wacker	26	16	2	8	86	53	+33	34	
5	Austria Wien	26	13	7	6	68	49	+19	33	
6	Admira Wien	26	10	7	9	54	51	+3	27	
7	Kapfenberger SV	26	11	5	10	55	57	−2	27	
8	Grazer AK	26	8	9	9	45	47	−2	25	
9	Austria Salzburg	26	7	8	11	43	55	−12	22	
10	1. Simmeringer SC	26	10	1	15	57	55	+2	21	
11	FC Stadlau	26	7	6	13	29	48	−19	20	
12	FC Wien	26	6	5	15	39	77	−38	17	
13	Linzer ASK	26	7	2	17	46	63	−17	16	
14	Schwarz-Weiß Bregenz	26	2	4	20	13	93	−80	8	

Source: rsssf.com
(C) Champions

== Results ==
Home \ Away	ADM	ASZ	AWI	BRE	FIR	FCW	GAK	KAP	LIN	RWI	SIM	STA	WAK	WIE
Admira Wien		2–2	2–2	1–1	1–2	3–2	2–1	2–2	2–0	2–5	2–3	1–3	2–2	0–2
Austria Salzburg	1–4		2–2	5–0	0–3	1–1	2–1	0–1	1–3	2–7	0–5	2–0	1–4	1–2
Austria Wien	2–3	3–0		4–1	3–1	2–3	3–1	3–1	3–2	3–3	4–0	2–1	3–2	2–4
Bregenz	1–1	0–4	0–2		0–5	1–1	0–4	2–4	0–3	0–5	2–1	0–3	0–5	0–3
First Vienna	6–1	1–1	3–1	1–0		0–0	0–1	1–0	3–1	1–1	3–2	2–0	1–0	3–3
FC Wien	0–6	2–1	2–4	1–3	2–10		3–3	1–3	3–1	3–3	1–3	0–1	1–4	0–1
Grazer AK	0–3	1–1	1–1	3–1	1–1	1–3		0–0	3–2	4–4	2–0	3–1	4–3	1–1
Kapfenberger SV	3–3	2–2	2–1	7–0	1–3	2–4	2–2		4–2	2–1	0–5	3–1	2–5	1–4
Linzer ASK	1–2	2–5	1–1	7–0	0–2	1–0	2–3	0–2		2–6	3–1	2–0	1–2	0–3
Rapid Wien	2–0	1–1	1–2	8–0	0–5	6–0	3–1	7–4	2–5		7–1	2–2	2–3	2–2
Simmeringer SC	2–4	2–3	2–2	7–0	1–0	1–1	2–1	2–3	5–1	0–1		1–2	3–4	3–1
Stadlau	3–0	1–1	1–6	1–1	0–3	2–1	0–0	1–0	2–2	0–2	0–4		1–2	2–5
Wacker Wien	2–4	1–2	6–3	3–0	2–3	10–3	4–3	3–1	4–0	1–3	5–1	1–0		5–2
Wiener SC	2–1	4–2	4–4	4–0	4–1	4–0	3–0	2–3	4–2	1–2	2–0	2–2	6–3	

Legend: Blue = home team win; Yellow = draw; Red = away team win.
