= 1926–27 Austrian football championship =

16th season of top-tier football league in Austria

Austrian football championship
- Season: 1926-27
- Champions: SK Admira Wien
- Relegated: FC Rudolfshügel

Statistics of Austrian first league in the 1926–27 season.

== Overview ==
It was contested by 13 teams, and SK Admira Wien won the championship.

== League standings ==
Pos	Team	Pld	W	D	L	GF	GA	GD	Pts
1	SK Admira Wien	24	17	2	5	81	41	+40	36
2	Brigittenauer AC	24	14	5	5	44	24	+20	33
3	SK Rapid Wien	24	15	1	8	82	44	+38	31
4	First Vienna FC	24	12	3	9	67	45	+22	27
5	Floridsdorfer AC	24	11	5	8	48	54	−6	27
6	1. Simmeringer SC	24	11	4	9	44	52	−8	26
7	FK Austria Wien	24	10	4	10	46	42	+4	24
8	SC Wacker	24	8	6	10	43	48	−5	22
9	Hakoah Vienna	24	7	8	9	38	43	−5	22
10	Wiener AC	24	8	5	11	54	64	−10	21
11	Wiener Sportclub	24	8	4	12	46	52	−6	20
12	SK Slovan HAC	24	7	5	12	35	52	−17	19
13	SC Rudolfshügel	24	1	2	21	29	96	−67	4

Source: rsssf.com

== Results ==
Home \ Away	ADM	AUS	BRI	FIR	FLO	HAK	RAP	RUD	SIM	SLO	WAK	WAC	SPO
SK Admira Wien		0–4	5–0	3–5	4–2	3–1	2–6	4–3	10–0	3–1	3–0	7–2	1–3
FK Austria Wien	0–2		1–2	0–1	1–2	2–2	2–1	6–3	1–2	1–0	3–0	1–1	3–1
Brigittenauer AC	2–0	3–1		4–2	2–2	3–0	0–1	4–0	3–0	1–1	3–1	2–3	2–0
First Vienna	2–5	3–2	2–1		1–2	2–3	2–0	10–0	8–1	4–0	0–1	1–2	5–1
Floridsdorfer AC	3–3	1–6	0–0	1–1		2–0	1–10	4–2	3–1	4–1	3–1	3–2	3–2
Hakoah Vienna	0–2	2–2	1–1	3–3	1–1		1–2	3–0	1–1	2–0	2–0	5–2	1–1
SK Rapid Wien	0–2	4–1	1–2	8–1	5–3	4–0		8–1	2–2	4–1	5–1	2–4	2–1
FC Rudolfshügel	2–6	0–2	1–5	0–1	0–2	2–5	3–7		2–3	1–3	2–4	1–3	2–2
Simmeringer SC	0–1	8–2	1–0	1–1	2–1	2–1	1–2	3–0		2–3	2–1	2–0	3–1
SK Slovan HAC	0–4	0–1	0–1	1–3	1–0	2–1	4–3	0–0	2–2		2–2	3–5	2–2
SC Wacker	3–3	2–2	0–1	1–0	3–0	1–1	1–3	6–2	4–2	2–1		1–1	1–4
Wiener AC	2–5	1–2	1–1	1–7	1–4	5–1	4–1	1–2	1–2	2–3	2–2		4–4
Wiener Sportclub	0–3	1–0	0–1	4–2	4–1	0–1	4–1	4–0	2–1	2–4	1–5	2–4	

Legend: Blue = home team win; Yellow = draw; Red = away team win.
