= 1957–58 Austrian football championship =

40th season of top-tier football league in Austria

Austrian football championship
- Season: 1957–58
- Champions: Wiener Sportclub

The 1957–58 Austrian Staatsliga A was the 47th edition of top flight Football in Austria.

== Overview ==
It was contested by 14 teams, and Wiener Sportclub won the championship.

== League standings ==
Pos	Team	Pld	W	D	L	GF	GA	GD	Pts
1	Wiener Sportclub	26	20	5	1	100	35	+65	45
2	SK Rapid Wien	26	20	3	3	93	39	+54	43
3	First Vienna FC	26	12	6	8	57	39	+18	30
4	SC Wacker	26	10	8	8	54	39	+15	28
5	Grazer AK	26	10	7	9	63	46	+17	27
6	Wiener AC	26	10	6	10	57	51	+6	26
7	Kapfenberger SV	26	10	6	10	42	62	−20	26
8	FK Austria Wien	26	11	3	12	63	52	+11	25
9	1. Simmeringer SC	26	10	2	14	52	65	−13	22
10	SK Admira Wien	26	8	6	12	53	76	−23	22
11	SC Olympia 33	26	7	7	12	34	53	−19	21
12	Kremser SC	26	8	4	14	39	67	−28	20
13	SK Sturm Graz	26	7	3	16	42	81	−39	17
14	FC Wien	26	3	6	17	26	70	−44	12

Source: rsssf.com

== Results ==
Home \ Away	ADM	AWI	FIR	FCW	GAK	KAP	KRE	OLY	RWI	SIM	STU	WAK	WAC	WIE
Admira Wien		2–7	2–2	4–1	3–3	6–3	2–4	1–0	2–7	3–5	3–0	1–2	4–2	0–6
Austria Wien	6–1		3–2	5–1	1–3	1–0	0–1	1–1	1–1	6–2	5–0	0–3	0–1	3–6
First Vienna	0–2	2–1		4–0	1–2	2–2	3–1	2–2	1–2	3–2	2–1	2–1	0–0	1–2
FC Wien	0–0	1–3	0–4		1–2	0–4	3–4	1–1	0–5	3–2	1–1	0–2	1–2	0–5
Grazer AK	2–2	1–3	0–0	2–2		9–0	4–1	5–2	2–3	1–2	1–1	1–2	3–3	0–2
Kapfenberger SV	3–1	3–2	3–2	2–2	0–1		3–1	0–1	0–1	3–1	1–1	1–8	1–1	1–1
Kremser SC	1–0	3–3	2–5	0–4	3–0	1–2		2–1	0–1	0–4	1–5	2–2	1–1	0–3
Olympia 33	3–1	1–0	1–0	0–1	2–1	1–1	5–0		1–2	0–2	2–3	0–0	0–8	0–6
Rapid Wien	1–3	4–0	4–1	5–1	1–4	8–2	2–0	6–4		5–2	2–1	1–2	3–1	2–2
Simmeringer SC	1–1	2–6	1–3	1–0	2–1	0–1	4–0	2–2	2–5		3–1	0–2	1–3	2–5
Sturm Graz	4–5	3–1	1–7	2–0	1–6	1–2	0–4	2–3	0–10	5–3		3–2	0–2	0–1
Wacker Wien	2–2	1–0	2–3	2–2	1–4	1–2	0–1	0–0	5–5	1–3	6–0		1–1	3–4
Wiener AC	7–2	1–3	0–3	3–1	2–2	4–2	7–3	3–0	0–3	1–2	1–3	0–2		1–4
Wiener SC	4–0	6–2	2–2	5–0	5–3	5–0	3–3	3–1	2–4	4–1	7–3	1–1	6–2	

Legend: Blue = home team win; Yellow = draw; Red = away team win.
