= 1958–59 Austrian football championship =

41st season of top-tier football league in Austria

Austrian football championship
- Season: 1958–59
- Champions: Wiener Sportclub

The 1958–59 Austrian Staatsliga A was the 48th edition of top flight football in Austria.

== Overview ==
It was contested by 14 teams, and Wiener Sportclub won the championship for the third time in history, and second in a row. With this league title, it also became one of the few clubs to win the league unbeaten.

== League standings ==
Pos	Team	Pld	W	D	L	GF	GA	GD	Pts
1	Wiener Sportclub	26	20	6	0	104	35	+69	46
2	SK Rapid Wien	26	21	2	3	102	29	+73	44
3	First Vienna FC	26	13	6	7	63	41	+22	32
4	FK Austria Wien	26	12	7	7	63	47	+16	31
5	Wiener AC	26	12	6	8	56	45	+11	30
6	1. Simmeringer SC	26	10	6	10	63	58	+5	26
7	Grazer AK	26	11	3	12	46	61	−15	25
8	SC Wacker	26	10	3	13	57	61	−4	23
9	Kremser SC	26	8	6	12	49	51	−2	22
10	WSV Donawitz	26	9	3	14	63	91	−28	21
11	Linzer ASK	26	9	3	14	46	68	−22	21
12	SK Admira Wien	26	8	3	15	55	63	−8	19
13	Kapfenberger SV	26	5	6	15	32	68	−36	16
14	SC Olympia 33	26	2	4	20	25	106	−81	8

Source: rsssf.com

== Results ==
Home \ Away	ADM	AWI	DON	FIR	GAK	KAP	KRE	LIN	OLY	RWI	SIM	WAK	WAC	WIE
Admira Wien		3–3	3–2	1–4	0–1	0–1	2–5	1–4	4–2	0–3	1–1	3–0	2–3	2–6
Austria Wien	5–3		1–3	5–2	2–3	0–0	1–0	4–3	6–1	1–2	3–1	5–2	0–3	2–2
Donawitz	1–8	2–2		3–2	4–2	2–1	2–3	3–4	5–3	1–6	3–4	1–1	2–1	2–4
First Vienna	1–4	0–0	5–2		2–0	2–2	3–1	1–2	8–0	0–1	3–1	2–2	2–2	2–4
Grazer AK	4–3	0–0	5–2	1–4		1–4	1–4	2–1	1–1	2–1	5–3	1–0	2–4	0–6
Kapfenberger SV	1–2	0–2	1–2	0–4	4–1		0–3	2–3	1–2	2–9	0–0	2–5	0–2	2–2
Kremser SC	3–2	2–3	5–2	1–4	1–2	3–3		0–1	3–0	1–3	3–3	2–1	2–2	1–1
Linzer ASK	1–3	3–2	2–6	0–1	1–0	4–0	1–1		3–2	0–8	2–2	2–5	1–3	0–1
Olympia 33	0–4	1–8	2–5	1–3	0–2	0–0	2–2	2–1		0–3	1–8	1–3	2–2	0–9
Rapid Wien	5–2	4–1	9–0	1–1	2–1	3–1	3–1	5–1	10–0		6–3	5–1	2–0	3–2
Simmeringer SC	1–0	2–3	3–3	2–2	2–1	0–1	2–0	3–2	3–0	2–4		3–2	2–1	3–4
Wacker Wien	3–1	1–2	6–3	1–2	5–1	1–4	2–0	4–2	4–1	0–2	2–1		1–1	1–5
Wiener AC	2–0	3–1	4–1	1–2	3–5	4–0	2–1	2–2	5–1	1–1	1–4	3–2		0–3
Wiener SC	1–1	1–1	5–1	3–1	2–2	11–0	3–1	6–0	3–1	4–3	5–4	6–2	4–1	

Legend: Blue = home team win; Yellow = draw; Red = away team win.
