= 1932–33 Austrian football championship =

22nd season of top-tier football league in Austria

Austrian football championship
- Season: 1932-33

Statistics of Austrian first league in the 1932–33 season.

== Overview ==
It was contested by 12 teams, and First Vienna FC won the championship.

== League standings ==
Pos	Team	Pld	W	D	L	GF	GA	GD	Pts
1	First Vienna FC	22	16	3	3	52	26	+26	35
2	SK Rapid Wien	22	15	2	5	65	35	+30	32
3	SK Admira Wien	22	11	3	8	63	42	+21	25
4	Wiener AC	22	10	3	9	46	41	+5	23
5	FC Wien	22	9	5	8	39	37	+2	23
6	FK Austria Wien	22	9	3	10	37	45	−8	21
7	SC Wacker	22	10	0	12	49	58	−9	20
8	Hakoah Vienna	22	9	1	12	30	41	−11	19
9	Wiener Sportclub	22	7	4	11	36	42	−6	18
10	Floridsdorfer AC	22	6	5	11	35	47	−12	17
11	SC Libertas	22	5	7	10	23	34	−11	17
12	Brigittenauer AC	22	6	2	14	28	55	−27	14

Source: rsssf.com

== Results ==
Home \ Away	ADM	AUS	BRI	FIR	FLO	HAK	LIB	RAP	WAK	WIE	WAC	SPO
SK Admira Wien		1–2	5–2	1–2	2–2	1–0	1–2	4–7	3–4	6–1	5–3	2–1
FK Austria Wien	1–2		1–5	1–2	1–5	3–1	2–2	0–2	0–2	2–4	1–1	2–1
Brigittenauer AC	1–4	1–2		0–3	3–2	0–4	1–0	1–2	3–1	1–3	0–3	2–1
First Vienna	2–2	0–1	2–1		6–1	2–1	1–3	4–1	3–1	1–1	1–2	2–0
Floridsdorfer AC	0–7	0–2	4–0	2–3		3–2	1–2	1–2	3–2	2–0	0–1	0–3
Hakoah Vienna	1–0	4–1	3–0	1–3	1–0		2–0	0–4	2–3	0–0	0–2	3–1
SC Libertas	0–2	3–3	1–1	0–1	1–1	0–1		0–0	0–1	1–1	3–1	1–0
SK Rapid Wien	4–2	0–2	3–0	2–3	1–1	5–2	5–1		7–2	2–1	3–1	5–3
SC Wacker	3–2	2–3	1–4	2–3	3–1	5–1	2–1	1–4		1–4	4–3	1–2
FC Wien	1–4	2–0	1–1	1–2	2–2	4–0	3–0	2–1	2–6		2–0	0–0
Wiener AC	1–5	3–1	6–1	1–5	2–2	4–0	0–1	3–1	4–1	2–1		2–3
Wiener Sportclub	3–1	2–6	3–0	1–1	1–2	0–1	4–3	1–4	3–1	2–2	1–1	

Legend: Blue = home team win; Yellow = draw; Red = away team win.
