= Post SV Wien =

Sports club in Vienna, Austria

Post Sportverein Wien is a multi-sports club from the city of Vienna in Austria, and today operates in addition to football another 23 sections, including handball, field hockey, tennis, basketball, volleyball, futsal, table tennis, bowling, bridge, weightlifting, gymnastics, squash, skiing, Motorsport, judo and chess.

== Basketball ==
The formerly operated basketball section won in 1950 for the only time in their history the Austrian basketball championship.

== Football ==
The association was founded on 26 September 1919 under the name of Post- Telegraphen- und Fernsprechangestellten Österreichs (sports club of Austrian postal telegraph and telephone employees). The club colors are black and white and played in the first year in Vienna protecting group. On March 22, 1924, came the merger with the W.F.C. Fürth and a change in the club name in Sport Klub Post Wien, Sports Association of postal and telegraph employees with the club colors blue and orange. The SK Post rose 1924 in the fourth class of the General Football Association (today WFV) and reached in the first year the league title and the associated rise in the third grade Vienna. Also in this class which went straight to the championship. After separation from the Football Association played the SK Post Wien in 2nd class East and rose after the league title in 1927/28 on the 1st Amateur class.

== Hockey ==
The already existing in the 1930s and finally in 1939 established department maintains several women's, men's and youth teams, as well as a senior and a parent hockey team.

- Austrian Champion Men Outdoor: 2023, 2006, 1982, 1968, 1967, 1965, 1964, 1963, 1962, 1960, 1959, 1958, 1957, 1956, 1955, 1954, 1953, 1951
- Austrian Champion Men Indoor: 2022, 2021, 2020, 1974, 1966, 1965, 1964, 1963, 1962, 1961, 1959, 1958, 1951
- Austrian Champion Ladies Outdoor: 1980, 1960
- Austrian Champion Ladies Indoor: 1982, 1981, 1979, 1977, 1976

== Judo ==
The Judo Section was founded in January 1948.

List of the national champions of Post SV Wien:

Year	Name	Category
1948	Gabriel Edmund	FG
1949	Gabriel Edmund	FG
1950	Gabriel Edmund	FG
1950	Voyta Alfred	MG
1951	Voyta Alfred	MG
1955	Zipser Rudolf	1. Kyū

== Table tennis ==
The table tennis section decreed especially before the Second World War a number of top Austrian players like Erwin Kaspar, Heinrich Bednar and Gertrude Pritzi.
