= Wiener AF =

- Full name: Wiener Assoziations Footballclub
- Founded: 1910; 116 years ago
- Dissolved: 2004; 22 years ago

Wiener AF or WAF was a football club which played in Austria. It dissolved in 2004.

== History ==
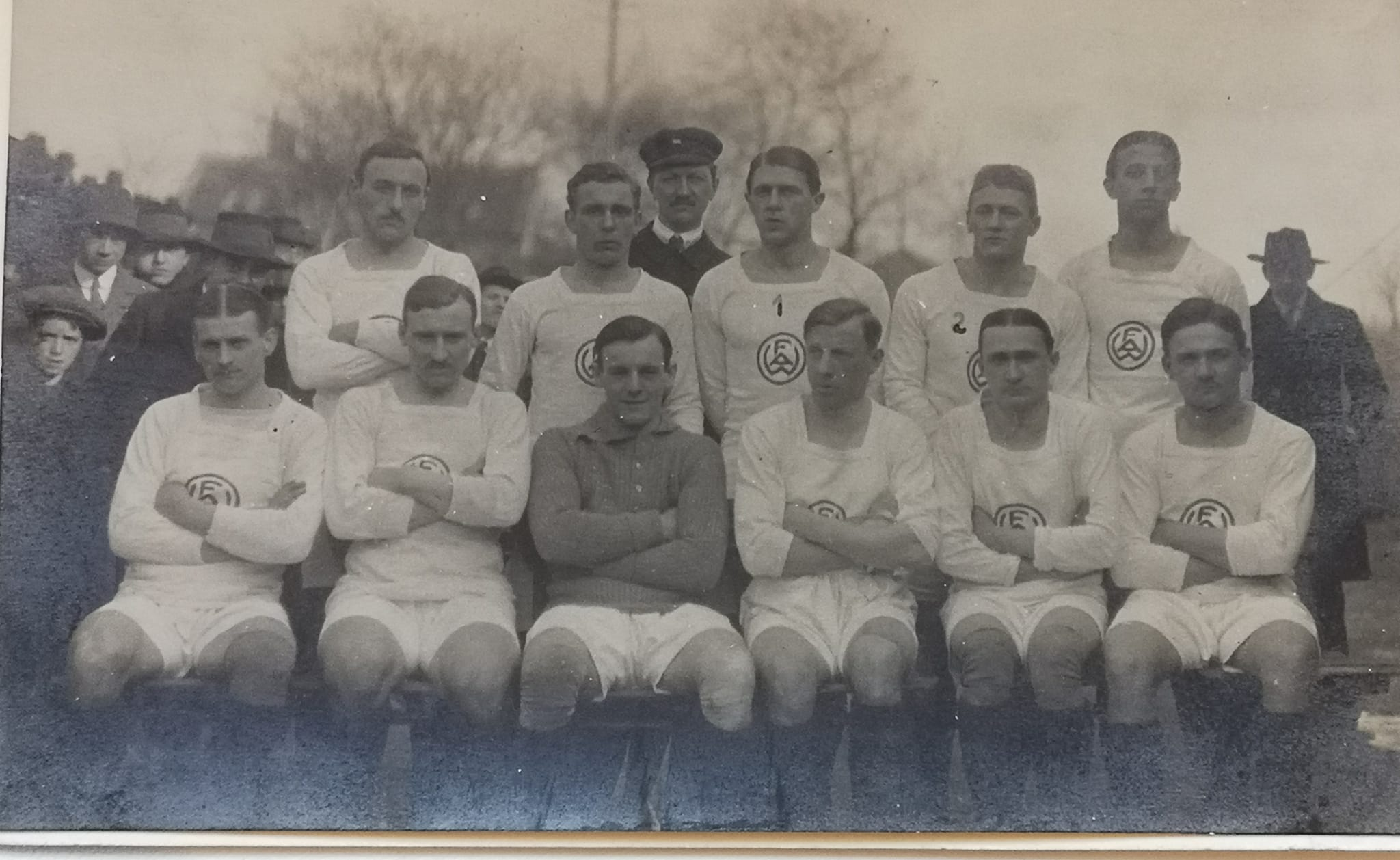
Team 1911

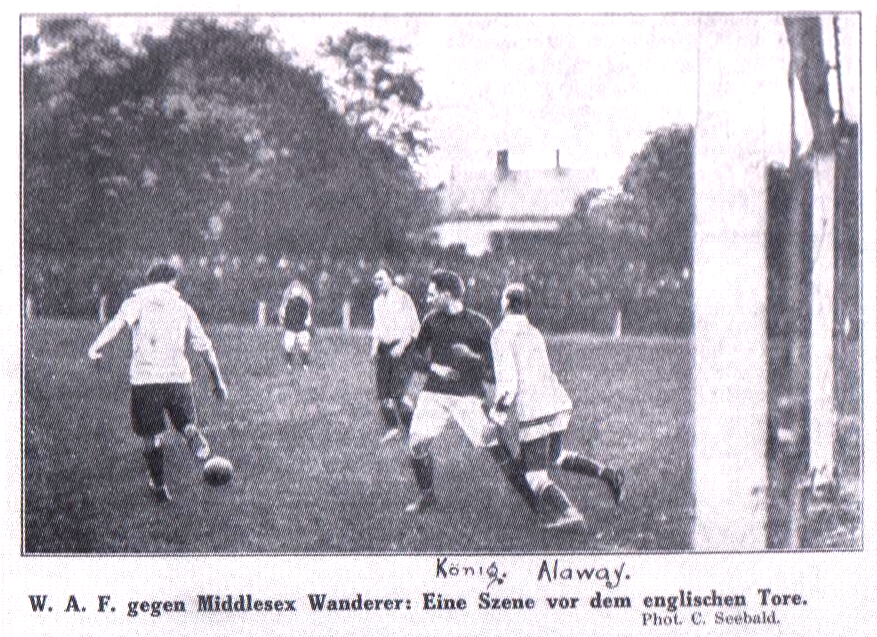
1912: Middlesex Wanderers goalmouth under siege from WAF Wien, photo by Carl Seebald. Engelbert König (senior) is in dark coloured shirt

The club was established at the end of the 1909–10 season after most of the first-team squad of Wiener AC (known as WAC) left the club to form a new club. The club was named Wiener Assoziationsfootball Club, aiming to inherit the WAC abbreviation. However, the club became generally known as Wiener Assoziations Footballclub (WAF).

On 21 September 1910, the club gained entry to the 1. Klasse division. WAF and Wiener Sport-Club were the best teams during the Autumn part of the season; as a result, a play-off match was held between the two clubs. The first game was a 1–1 draw, with WAF winning the replay 3–1.

In 1911–12 WAF finished fourth in the league. On 26 May 1912 they hosted a match with Middlesex Wanderers whom they beat 5–1. Cookson scored for Middlesex and Adolf Fischera scored a hattrick for WAF, with a goal each from Engelbert König (senior) and Richard 'Little' Kohn.

After finishing second in 1912–13, they won the league in 1913–14. In 1921–22 the club won the Austrian Cup for the only time in their history, beating SV Amateure 2–1 in the final.

In 1923–24 the club finished bottom of the 1. Klasse division and were relegated to the second tier.

== Honours ==
- 1. Klasse
  - Champions 1913–14
- Austrian Cup
  - Winners 1921–22
