= First Vienna FC =

Austrian football club, based in Vienna

Coordinates: 48°14′56″N 16°21′35″E

- Full name: First Vienna Football Club 1894
- Nickname: Vienna
- Founded: 22 August 1894; 132 years ago
- Ground: Hohe Warte Stadium
- Capacity: 5,500
- Manager: Hans Kleer
- League: 2. Liga
- 2025–26: 2. Liga, 7th of 16
- Website: https://www.firstviennafc.at/
Home colours	Away colours

First Vienna Football Club 1894 is an Austrian football club based in the Döbling district of Vienna. Established on 22 August 1894, it is the country's oldest team and has played a notable role in the history of the game there. It is familiarly known to Austrians by the English name Vienna.

== History ==
=== Foundation and early years ===
First Vienna FC was founded on 22 August 1894 in Döbling, making it the oldest football club in Austria. The club’s colours blue and yellow derived from Rothschild racing uniforms, while the triskelion logo was designed by Manx player William Beale. On 15 November 1894, Vienna played its first official match, a 0–4 loss to Vienna Cricket and Football-Club.

The club captured the Challenge Cup in 1899 and 1900, one of the first international tournaments in Central Europe.

=== Golden era ===
Vienna enjoyed major success between the late 1920s and 1930s, winning the Austrian Cup in 1929 and 1930, the Austrian Championship in 1931 and 1933, and the Mitropa Cup in 1931, unbeaten across all matches. The team added another Austrian Cup in 1937.

=== Gauliga and World War II ===
Following the Anschluss in 1938, Vienna played in the Gauliga Ostmark. They won divisional titles in 1942, 1943 and 1944, reaching the German Championship Final in 1942 (losing 0–2 to Schalke 04). In 1943, the club became the Tschammerpokal (German Cup) winner, defeating Luftwaffen-SV Hamburg 3–2 after extra time.

=== Postwar period ===
After Austria regained independence, Vienna claimed the Austrian Championship in 1955, edging Wiener Sport-Club on goal quotient.

=== Decline and fluctuating fortunes ===
From the 1960s, Vienna faced several relegations. They returned to the top flight in 1986, and highlights included two UEFA Cup appearances (1988–89, 1989–90).

Vienna reached the Austrian Cup Final in 1997 (losing 1–2 to Sturm Graz), but financial difficulties deepened. By 2000, the club was relegated to the Regionalliga Ost (third tier). In 2017, after sponsor Care-Energy went bankrupt, the club entered insolvency proceedings, and by court order was demoted to the fifth division.

Following the announcement in May 2017 Vienna FC secured sponsorship from UNIQA enabling a conclusion of the insolvency proceedings and avoidance of bankruptcy.

Vienna FC secured an additional sponsor in September 2020 from IMMOunited, who became the main partner for the youth academy of First Vienna FC 1894.

=== Revival ===
Despite financial setbacks, Vienna began climbing back up: champions of the 2. Landesliga Wien in 2019, they later secured promotion to the Regionalliga Ost (2021) and the Austrian Second League in 2022.

== First Vienna FC in Europe ==
Season	Competition	Round	Country	Club	Home	Away	Aggregate
1988–89	UEFA Cup	1	(Denmark)	Ikast FS	1–0	1–2	2–2 (a)
1988–89	UEFA Cup	2	(Finland)	TPS Turku	2–1	0–1	2–2 (a)
1989–90	UEFA Cup	1	(Malta)	Valletta	3–0	4–1	7–1
1989–90	UEFA Cup	2	(Greece)	Olympiacos Piraeus	2–2	1–1	3–3 (a)

== Current squad ==
As of 14 July 2026

Note: Flags indicate national team as defined under FIFA eligibility rules; some limited exceptions apply. Players may hold more than one non-FIFA nationality.

No.	Pos.	Nation	Player
1	GK	AUT	Bernhard Unger
3	DF	GER	Marlon Winter
4	DF	AUT	Philipp Breit
7	FW	AUT	Christoph Monschein
8	MF	AUT	Bernhard Luxbacher
10	FW	AUT	Tobias Anselm
11	FW	FRA	Youssouf Soukouna
17	DF	AUT	Benjamin Rosenberger
18	FW	AUT	Bernhard Zimmermann
19	MF	AUT	Florian Prohart
20	MF	AUT	Felix Nagele
21	MF	GER	Max Mergner

No.	Pos.	Nation	Player
22	DF	AUT	Tobias Gruber
23	DF	AUT	Marco Gantschnig
24	DF	AUT	Raul Marte
25	DF	AUT	Jürgen Bauer
26	MF	AUT	Maximilian Fillafer
28	MF	AUT	Kai Stratznig
29	FW	AUT	Moritz Jerabek
32	DF	AUT	Felix Luckeneder
33	GK	AUT	Kilian Kretschmer
66	MF	AUT	David Ungar
77	FW	AUT	Luca Edelhofer

== Notable players ==
- (Argentina) Mario Kempes, (1986–1987) World Cup Winner and former Argentinian International
- (Austria) Alfred Drabits, (1988–1991) Former Austrian International
- (Finland) Kimmo Lipponen, (1989) former Finnish international
- (Austria) Zeljko Radovic, (1994–1997) Former Austrian International
- Gary Noël, (2015–2016) Former Mauritius International
- (Turkey) Turgay Bahadır (2015–2016) Former Turkish International
- (Austria) Markus Katzer, (2015–2020) Former Austrian International
- (North Macedonia) Mensur Kurtisi, (2016–2021) Former North Macedonian International
- (Austria) Ümit Korkmaz, (2019–2020) Former Austrian International
- (Austria) Andreas Lukse, (2021–2023) Former Austrian International

== Honours ==
- Austrian Champions (6): 1931, 1933, 1942, 1943, 1944, 1955
- Austrian Cup (3): 1929, 1930, 1937
- Austrian 2. Landesliga: Champions 2019
- Austrian Regionalliga: Champions 2022
- Challenge Cup (2): 1899, 1900
- German Cup (1): 1943
- Mitropa Cup (1): 1931
- Liberation Cup (1): 1946
- Tournoi de l'Exposition Coloniale (Paris-Vincennes) (1): 1931
- Tournoi du Nouvel An du Red Star (1): 1924 (shared)
- Tournoi de Nöel de Paris : Runners-up 1935
