= Wiener Sport-Club =

Multisports club in Austria

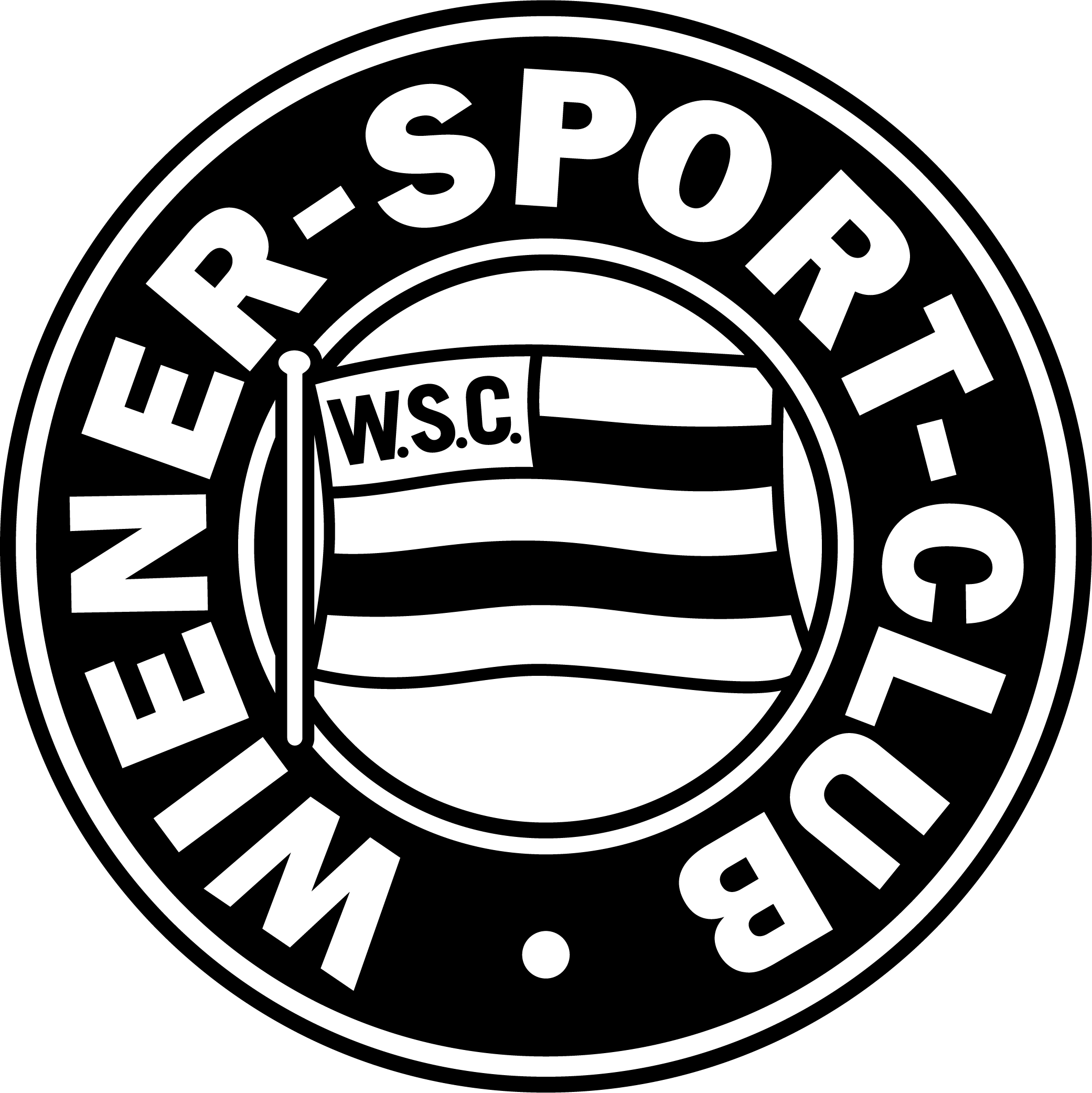
- Founded: 24 February 1883; 143 years ago
- Ground: Sportclub-Platz
- Capacity: 5,600
- Manager: Stefan Rapp
- League: Regionalliga East
- 2025–26: Regionalliga East, 10th of 17
Home colours	Away colours

The Wiener Sport-Club, short WSC, was established on 24 February 1883 in Vienna, Austria and is one of the country's oldest multi-sport clubs. Their traditional home is in the Dornbach quarter of the city (17th district). The club is best known for its football team, established 1907. In Austria, the club is colloquially referred to as "Sport-Club".

== History ==
At various times throughout its history the club has had departments for fencing, boxing, wrestling, cycling, handball, track and field, field hockey, tennis, squash, football and water polo. The football team enjoyed success in Austria National Championship in 1922, 1958 and 1959. Their 1958 season included an impressive 7–0 victory over Juventus in European Champions Cup. Two bankruptcies in the 1990s eventually led the team to slip into the lower leagues.

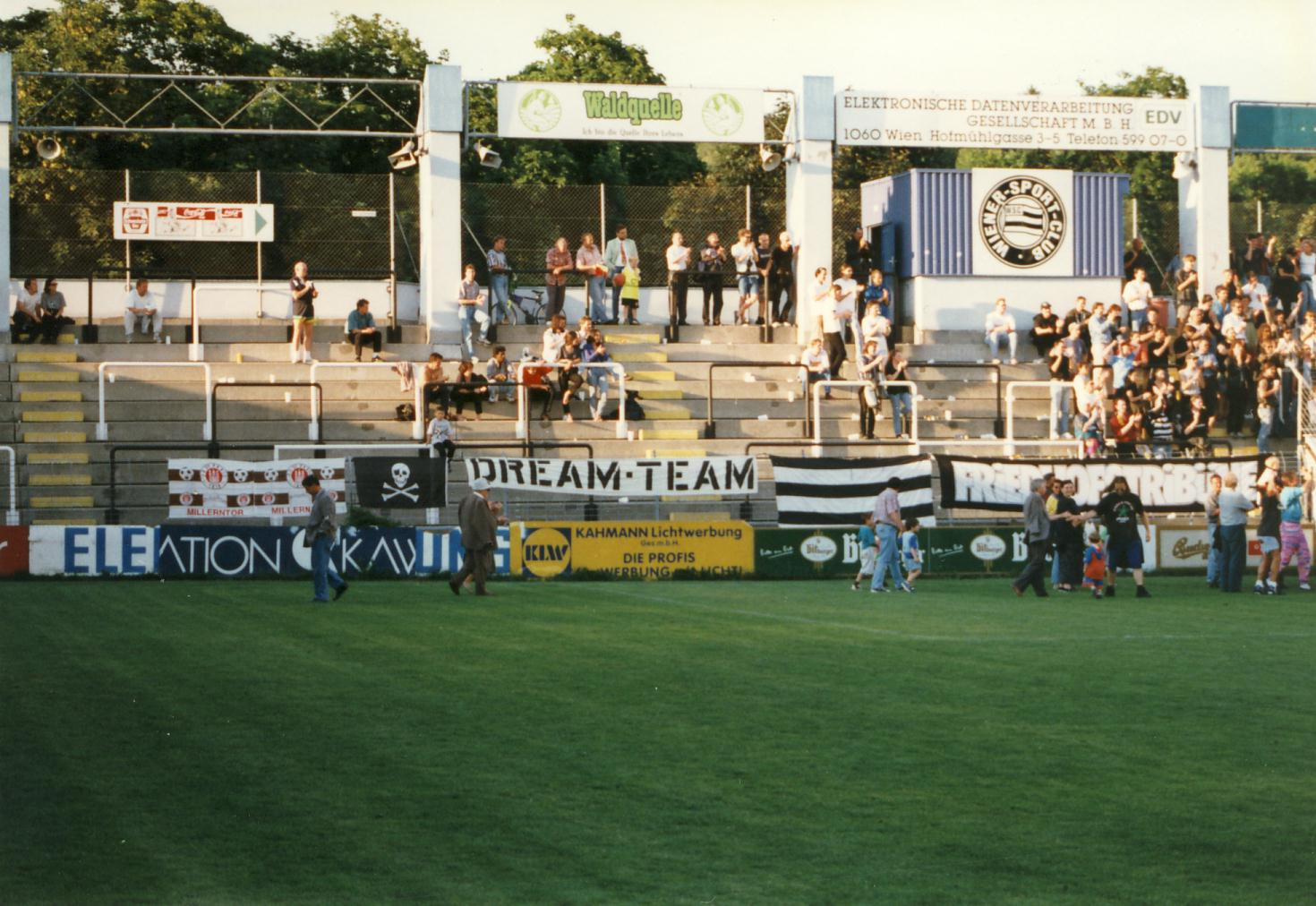
Historic Friedhofstribüne - demolished in 2024 and since rebuild - home stand of Wiener Sport-Club Stadium

In 2001, the football section split off as Wiener Sportklub due to financial troubles and was re-integrated back into WSC in 2017. The first squad currently plays in the Austrian Regionalliga East (3rd Division). The club's home ground Wiener Sport-Club Stadium (or Sportclub-Platz in German) dates back to 1904 and is considered as Austria's oldest actively used football field. Player and coach Erich Hof is known as the club's legend.

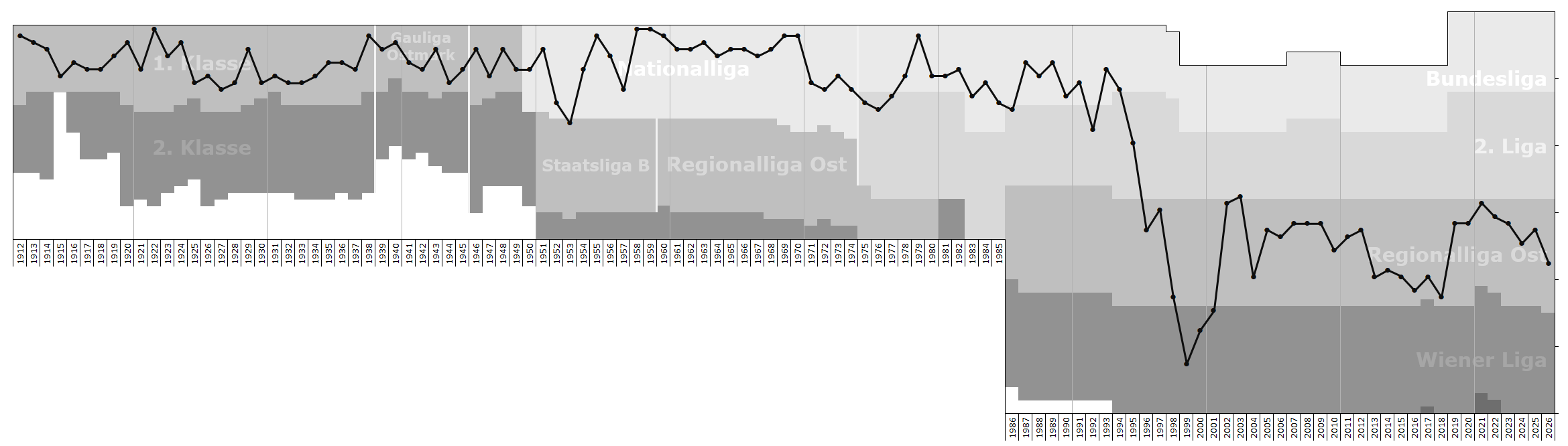
Historical chart of Wiener Sport-Club league performance

== Honours ==
- Austrian Football Bundesliga
  - Champions (3): 1921–22, 1957–58, 1958–59
- Austrian Cup
  - Winners (1): 1922–23
- Austrian Football First League
  - Champions (1): 1976–77
- Austrian Regionalliga East
  - Champions (1): 2001–02
- Challenge Cup
  - Winners (2): 1904–05, 1910–11

== Club staff ==
- Manager: Stefan Rapp

== Current squad ==
As of 13 April, 2026

Note: Flags indicate national team as defined under FIFA eligibility rules; some limited exceptions apply. Players may hold more than one non-FIFA nationality.

No.	Pos.	Nation	Player
1	GK	AUT	Florian Pröglhof
2	DF	AUT	Sami Vehabović
3	DF	AUT	Leonardo Ivkić
4	DF	AUT	Marko Grubesic
5	DF	AUT	Luka Gusic
6	DF	AUT	Stefan Radulovic
7	MF	AUT	Konstantin Kerschbaumer
8	MF	AUT	Nicholas Wunsch
9	FW	AUT	Samuel Oppong
11	MF	AUT	Eren Keles
13	DF	AUT	Lucas Pfaffl

No.	Pos.	Nation	Player
15	DF	AUT	Patrick Puchegger
16	MF	AUT	Emirhan Tütünci
18	MF	AUT	Dominik Akrap
19	FW	AUT	Marcel Griebus
20	MF	AUT	Rocco Sutterlüty
21	FW	CRO	Darijo Pecirep
22	GK	AUT	Florian Steiger
23	MF	AUT	Mirza Berkovic
24	FW	AUT	Nils Zatl
27	DF	AUT	Patrick Touray
28	FW	AUT	Leon Aichinger
30	GK	AUT	Amer Softic

== Notable players ==
- (Austria) Hans Krankl
- (Republic of Ireland) Eric Barber
- (Austria) Erich Hof
- (Romania) Lorin Avădanei
- (Denmark) Finn Laudrup
- (Nigeria) Julius Emanche
- (Germany) Horst Blankenburg
- (Germany) Lothar Ulsaß
- (Austria) Christian Keglevits

== Notable coaches ==
- (Austria) Erich Hof
- (Poland) Antoni Brzeżańczyk
- (Serbia) Slobodan Batričević
- Goalkeeper Coach: (Serbia) Mirko Radulović
