= Robert Sara =

Austrian footballer

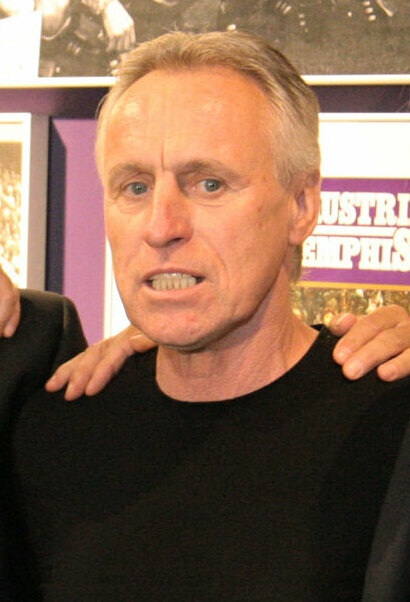
- Sara in 2009

Personal information
- Full name: Robert Sara
- Date of birth: 9 June 1946 (age 80)
- Place of birth: Oberlainsitz, Austria
- Height: 1.73 m (5 ft 8 in)
- Position: Defender

Youth career
- 1955–1964: SV Donau

Senior career*
Years	Team	Apps	(Gls)
1965–1984	Austria Wien	571	(23)
1985	Favoritner AC Wien	20	(0)
Total		591	(23)

International career
1965–1980	Austria	55	(3)
- * Club domestic league appearances and goals

Robert Sara (born 9 June 1946) is an Austrian former professional footballer who played as a defender. His younger brother Josef was also a footballer.

== Club career ==
Sara was bornborn in Oberlainsitz, near St. Martin im Waldviertel. He became a club legend at Austria Wien, after staying 20 years at the club and winning major silverware with them. He started his professional career at 19 and won nine league titles, 6 domestic cups and played in the 1978 Cup Winner's Cup Final which they lost 4–0 against Anderlecht. His 571 games is a record for the most appearances by a player in the Austrian top flight.

Sara was chosen in Austria's Team of the Century in 2001.

== International career ==
Sara made his debut for the Austria national team in a 3–2 win over England at Wembley in October 1965 and played in the 1978 FIFA World Cup finals. Captain of the team, he played the decisive pass to Hans Krankl to score the winning goal against arch-rivals West Germany in a game dubbed The miracle of Córdoba, which the Austrians won 3–2 and which was Austria's first win against West Germany for 47 years.

He earned 55 caps, scoring three goals. His last international was a May 1980 friendly match against Argentina.

== Honours ==
Austria Wien

- Austrian Bundesliga (9): 1968–69, 1969–70, 1975–76, 1977–78, 1978–79, 1979–80, 1980–81, 1983–84, 1984–85
- Austrian Cup (6): 1966-67, 1970–71, 1973–74, 1976–77, 1979–80, 1981–82
