= Ivica Brzić =

Yugoslav and Serbian football manager and player

Personal information
- Date of birth: 28 May 1941
- Place of birth: Újvidék, Kingdom of Hungary
- Date of death: 1 June 2014 (aged 73)
- Place of death: Novi Sad, Serbia
- Position: Defender

Youth career
- Vojvodina
- Novi Sad

Senior career*
Years	Team	Apps	(Gls)
1960–1964	Novi Sad	77	(0)
1964	Željezničar Sarajevo	14	(0)
1965–1972	Vojvodina	200	(5)
1972–1974	Alpine Donawitz	53	(6)
1974–1976	VÖEST Linz	81	(2)
Total		425	(13)

International career
1966	Yugoslavia	1	(0)

Managerial career
- 1977–1978: Vojvodina (assistant)
- 1978–1979: Vojvodina
- 1980–1981: Alpine Donawitz
- 1982–1983: Spartak Subotica
- 1983–1986: Osasuna
- 1987–1988: Vojvodina
- 1988–1989: Mallorca
- 1989: Rad
- 1990–1991: Vojvodina
- 1991–1993: Universitario
- 1994: Blooming
- 1994–1995: Alianza Lima
- 1995–1996: Oviedo
- 1996: Hércules Alicante
- 1997: Universitario
- 1999: Sport Boys
- 2001: Alianza Lima
- 2007–2008: Vojvodina
Medal record
Silver medal – second place	UEFA European Championship	1968
- * Club domestic league appearances and goals

Ivan "Ivica" Brzić (Serbian Cyrillic: Иван Ивица Брзић; 28 May 1941 – 1 June 2014) was a Yugoslav and Serbian football manager and player.

== Early life ==
Brzić was born during World War II in the city of Novi Sad (then called Újvidék) that had been annexed just months before his birth by the Kingdom of Hungary.

== Club career ==
Brzić made his debut for Novi Sad in the 1960–61 Yugoslav Second League, helping them win promotion to the Yugoslav First League. He played regularly for the side in the top tier of Yugoslav football over the next three seasons. Following the club's relegation to the Second League in 1964, Brzić moved to Željezničar Sarajevo, along with Lazar Lemić and Ilija Tojagić.

In the 1965 winter transfer window, Brzić joined his parent club Vojvodina. He helped them win the Yugoslav First League in the 1965–66 season, missing just one game in the process. Over the course of 7 1/2 years at Vojvodina, Brzić amassed 200 league appearances and scored five goals.

In the summer of 1972, Brzić moved abroad to Austria, spending two seasons with DSV Alpine and 2 1/2 seasons with VÖEST Linz, before retiring during the 1976–77 winter break.

== International career ==
At international level, Brzić was capped once for Yugoslavia against the Soviet Union in 1966. He was also selected to represent the nation at UEFA Euro 1968, but remained unused in the tournament. Yugoslavia finished as runners-up after losing to Italy in the final.

== Managerial career ==
After hanging up his boots, Brzić briefly worked as a coordinator in the youth system of Vojvodina before becoming an assistant to Branko Stanković with the seniors in 1977. He replaced him as the club's manager the following year, aged 37. Between 1983 and 1986, Brzić was manager of La Liga side Osasuna, qualifying for European football for the first time in club history.

During the 1990s and early 2000s, Brzić spent several years in Peru, having stints with Universitario and Alianza Lima.

== Career statistics ==
=== Club ===
Appearances and goals by club, season and competition
Club	Season	League		
Club	Season	Division	Apps	Goals
Novi Sad	1960–61	Yugoslav Second League	11	0
Novi Sad	1961–62	Yugoslav First League	21	0
Novi Sad	1962–63	Yugoslav First League	19	0
Novi Sad	1963–64	Yugoslav First League	26	0
Novi Sad	Total		77	0
Željezničar Sarajevo	1964–65	Yugoslav First League	14	0
Vojvodina	1964–65	Yugoslav First League	13	0
Vojvodina	1965–66	Yugoslav First League	29	0
Vojvodina	1966–67	Yugoslav First League	30	0
Vojvodina	1967–68	Yugoslav First League	30	0
Vojvodina	1968–69	Yugoslav First League	16	0
Vojvodina	1969–70	Yugoslav First League	25	4
Vojvodina	1970–71	Yugoslav First League	26	1
Vojvodina	1971–72	Yugoslav First League	31	0
Vojvodina	Total		200	5
DSV Alpine	1972–73	Austrian Football Championship	21	5
DSV Alpine	1973–74	Austrian Football Championship	32	1
DSV Alpine	Total		53	6
VÖEST Linz	1974–75	Austrian Football Bundesliga	34	1
VÖEST Linz	1975–76	Austrian Football Bundesliga	31	0
VÖEST Linz	1976–77	Austrian Football Bundesliga	16	1
VÖEST Linz	Total		81	2
Career total			425	13

=== International ===
Appearances and goals by national team and year
National team	Year	Apps	Goals
Yugoslavia	1966	1	0
Total		1	0

== Honours ==
=== Player ===
Novi Sad

- Yugoslav Second League: 1960–61

Vojvodina

- Yugoslav First League: 1965–66

Yugoslavia

- UEFA European Championship runner-up: 1968

=== Manager ===
Universitario

- Torneo Descentralizado: 1992
