= Herbert Feurer =

Austrian footballer

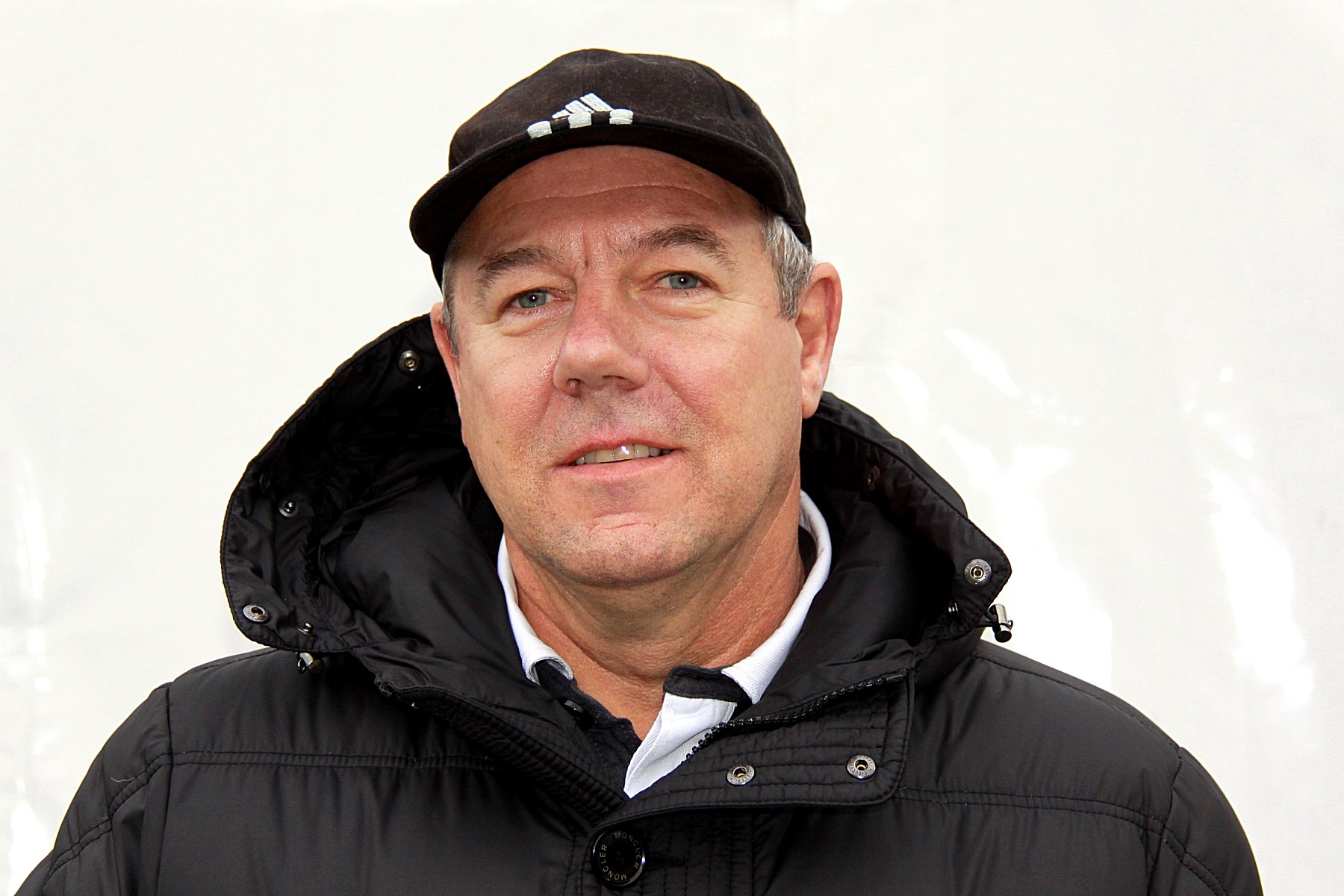

Personal information
- Full name: Herbert Feurer
- Date of birth: 14 January 1954 (age 72)
- Place of birth: Aspang, Austria
- Position: Goalkeeper

Senior career*
Years	Team	Apps	(Gls)
1975–1976	1. Wiener Neustädter SC		
1976–1989	Rapid Wien	289	(0)

International career
1980–1982	Austria	7	(0)
- * Club domestic league appearances and goals

Herbert Feurer (born 14 January 1954) is a retired football goalkeeper from Austria.

== Career ==
Born in Aspang, Feurer played professional football with 1. Wiener Neustädter SC and Rapid Wien. Feuer played 13 seasons with Rapid, winning the league (1981-82, 1982-83, 1986-87 and 1987-88) and cup four times with the club. He helped Rapid reach the final of the 1984–85 European Cup Winners' Cup. Feurer was voted Austria's football player of the year in 1980 and 1981.

He also appeared seven times for the Austria national team, featuring in the 1982 FIFA World Cup squad in Spain.
