= Božo Bakota =

Croatian footballer (1950–2015)

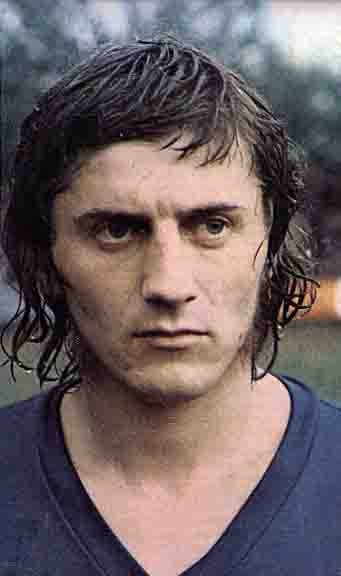
- Bakota in 1978

Personal information
- Date of birth: 5 October 1950
- Place of birth: Zagreb, PR Croatia, FPR Yugoslavia
- Date of death: 1 October 2015 (aged 64)
- Positions: Midfielder; forward

Senior career*
Years	Team	Apps	(Gls)
1970–1971	NK Mladost Buzin		
1971–1980	NK Zagreb	195	(53)
1980–1986	Sturm Graz	167	(86)
1986–1987	FC Fürstenfeld		
1988–1990	Toronto Croatia		
1990–1991	SV Wildon		
Total		362	(139)

International career
1978	Yugoslavia	1	(0)
- * Club domestic league appearances and goals

Božo Bakota (5 October 1950 – 1 October 2015) was a Croatian footballer who throughout his entire professional football career played only for two football clubs, NK Zagreb and SK Sturm Graz. He played as a midfielder for NK Zagreb and as a forward for SK Sturm Graz during a career spanning from 1971 to 1986.

== Club career ==
=== NK Zagreb ===
Bakota started his career with NK Zagreb and played there for the first nine seasons of his career, at a time when the club was struggling to establish themselves as a stable top flight side. At the beginning of his career, he participated in one of the most notable matches NK Zagreb ever played. It was a second leg of qualifying match between NK Zagreb and NK Osijek for entering the first league. The first one in Osijek ended 0–0. Match, known as "Great drama in Maksimir", took place on 19 July 1973 at Maksimir stadium because of great demand for tickets. The attendance was 64.138 which broke the stadium record and stands to this day. He came in the game later on as a substitute for another notable NK Zagreb player, Željko Smolek. NK Zagreb eventually won the match, after a penalty shoot-out (4–3) which allowed them to play in season 1973–74 with the best clubs in top division. He stayed with the club after they were relegated from first division at the end of the 1973–74 season, and helped them return to top division the following years. In season 1974–75, which was the best season from Bakota in Zagreb jersey as he scored 11 goals in 34 appearances NK Zagreb finished second in Group West of Yugoslav Second League behind Borac from Banja Luka with no promotion to top division. Next season, NK Zagreb finally achieved promotion to first division by winning the Group West of Yugoslav Second League. Bakota scored 6 goals in 17 appearances. His second best season with NK Zagreb was 1977–78 when he scored 10 goals in 28 appearances, playing as their starting line-up midfielder. However, in 1979 they were relegated again.

=== Sturm Graz ===
After staying at the club for one more season, Bakota decided to re-join his former manager Otto Barić at Austrian side SK Sturm Graz in 1980. He flourished there, forming an attacking partnership with Gernot Jurtin, and helping the club finish as league runners-up in the 1980–81 season, as well as becoming the league's top scorer in the 1981–82 season with 24 goals in 36 appearances. In European competitions, his greatest achievement was reaching the 1983–84 UEFA Cup quarter-finals with Sturm, before they were knocked out by England's Nottingham Forest 1–2 on aggregate. Bakota retired in 1986, having scored a total of 86 goals in 167 Austrian Bundesliga appearances for Sturm.

His retirement was short lived as he played at the regional levels with FC Fürstenfeld, and SV Wildon. In 1988, he played abroad in the National Soccer League with Toronto Croatia.

== International career ==
His good games at NK Zagreb were also noticed by the national team manager Dražan Jerković who called him up to the national side in 1978. Bakota debuted and earned his single national cap on 15 November 1978, in a Balkan Cup 4–1 win against Greece held in Skopje (in a match which saw Vahid Halilhodžić scoring a hat-trick).

== Personal life ==
Bakota owned a popular cafe the center of Graz as well as gas stations, but the businesses failed and he moved back to his birthplace of Buzin, a village near Zagreb. He died on 1 October 2015.
