= 1985–86 Austrian Football Bundesliga =

68th season of top-tier football league in Austria

Austrian Bundesliga
- Season: 1985–86
- Champions: FK Austria Wien

Statistics of Austrian Football Bundesliga in the 1985–86 season.

== Overview ==
The fall season is performed in 12 teams, and the higher eight teams proceed to the Meister playoff. The lower four teams fight in the Mittlere Playoff with the higher four teams of the Austrian Football First League.

FK Austria Wien won the championship.

=== Teams and location ===
Location of teams in the 1985–86 Austrian Football Bundesliga

Teams of 1985–86 Austrian Football Bundesliga

- FC Admira/Wacker
- Austria Wien
- Donawitzer SV Alpine
- Eisenstadt
- Grazer AK
- Kärnten
- LASK
- Rapid Wien
- Salzburger AK
- Sturm Graz
- VÖEST Linz
- Wacker Innsbruck

== Autumn season ==
=== Table ===
Pos	Team	Pld	W	D	L	GF	GA	GD	Pts
1	Austria Wien	22	19	1	2	67	12	+55	39
2	Rapid Wien	22	16	5	1	73	15	+58	37
3	Austria Klagenfurt	22	7	9	6	33	34	−1	23
4	Grazer AK	22	9	5	8	37	41	−4	23
5	Linzer ASK	22	8	6	8	33	31	+2	22
6	Sturm Graz	22	5	12	5	25	33	−8	22
7	Admira/Wacker	22	7	6	9	38	34	+4	20
8	Wacker Innsbruck	22	7	6	9	43	43	0	20
9	VOEST Linz	22	7	6	9	23	41	−18	20
10	Eisenstadt	22	4	10	8	19	45	−26	18
11	Donawitzer SV Alpine	22	3	7	12	27	53	−26	13
12	Salzburger AK 1914	22	0	7	15	16	52	−36	7

Source: rsssf.com

=== Results ===
Home \ Away	ADM	KLA	AWI	DON	EIS	GAK	LIN	RWI	SAL	STU	VOE	WKR
Admira/Wacker		0–0	0–1	2–2	2–2	1–1	1–2	1–3	2–0	1–2	2–0	1–4
Austria Klagenfurt	0–4		0–2	2–1	1–1	2–1	1–1	2–2	2–2	1–1	0–0	2–3
Austria Wien	3–1	0–2		1–2	2–0	5–1	3–1	0–0	2–0	5–0	7–1	3–1
Donawitzer SV Alpine	1–1	1–1	1–4		1–1	0–7	1–3	0–3	4–2	0–0	2–3	2–5
Eisenstadt	2–2	0–5	0–4	1–0		1–1	1–0	0–6	3–2	0–0	0–2	1–1
Grazer AK	4–0	2–5	0–5	3–1	3–1		3–1	0–10	3–0	0–0	0–0	1–1
Linzer ASK	1–5	3–0	1–4	3–1	6–0	2–0		0–5	4–0	1–0	0–0	1–1
Rapid Wien	2–0	4–0	1–5	3–2	0–0	3–0	0–0		3–2	2–2	7–0	6–0
Salzburger AK 1914	0–3	1–2	0–5	1–1	1–1	1–3	0–0	0–4		0–0	1–1	0–2
Sturm Graz	0–3	2–2	0–2	2–2	0–0	2–1	2–1	0–3	2–2		3–1	1–1
VOEST Linz	2–1	2–1	0–2	0–1	0–2	0–1	2–1	0–4	3–1	2–2		3–3
Wacker Innsbruck	2–5	1–2	0–2	5–1	6–2	0–2	1–1	1–2	2–0	3–4	1–1	

Legend: Blue = home team win; Yellow = draw; Red = away team win.

== Spring season ==
=== Championship playoff ===
==== Table ====
Pos	Team	Pld	W	D	L	GF	GA	GD	Pts
1	Austria Wien	36	26	6	4	99	28	+71	58
2	Rapid Wien	36	23	10	3	101	34	+67	56
3	Wacker Innsbruck	36	14	11	11	69	57	+12	39
4	Linzer ASK	36	13	12	11	50	44	+6	38
5	Sturm Graz	36	9	17	10	45	50	−5	35
6	Grazer AK	36	13	9	14	53	60	−7	35
7	Admira/Wacker	36	9	11	16	54	66	−12	29
8	Austria Klagenfurt	36	8	12	16	41	67	−26	28

Source: rsssf.com

==== Results ====
Home \ Away	ADM	KLA	AWI	GAK	LIN	RWI	STU	WKR
Admira/Wacker		2–1	1–6	0–0	1–1	0–4	1–1	0–1
Austria Klagenfurt	1–0		0–6	0–2	0–3	2–2	1–4	1–1
Austria Wien	2–2	2–0		4–1	0–0	0–2	2–2	2–2
Grazer AK	4–1	2–1	0–2		0–1	0–1	0–0	3–1
Linzer ASK	2–2	1–0	0–1	1–1		0–3	1–0	1–1
Rapid Wien	5–3	1–1	3–1	3–1	2–2		0–0	0–2
Sturm Graz	1–2	5–0	2–3	1–1	2–1	1–2		0–3
Wacker Innsbruck	3–1	2–0	1–1	3–1	3–0	3–3	0–1	

Legend: Blue = home team win; Yellow = draw; Red = away team win.

=== Promotion/relegation playoff ===
==== Table ====
Pos	Team	Pld	W	D	L	GF	GA	GD	Pts
1	First Vienna (Note: Belongs to Austrian Football First League)	14	7	4	3	20	19	+1	18
2	VOEST Linz	14	7	3	4	22	15	+7	17
3	Wiener SC	14	6	3	5	21	14	+7	15
4	Eisenstadt	14	7	1	6	18	15	+3	15
5	Donawitzer SV Alpine	14	6	2	6	22	19	+3	14
6	Spittal an der Drau	14	5	3	6	15	18	−3	13
7	Vorwärts Steyr	14	4	5	5	14	18	−4	13
8	Salzburger AK 1914	14	2	3	9	8	22	−14	7

Source: rsssf.com

==== Results ====
Home \ Away	DON	EIS	FIR	SAL	SPI	VOE	VOR	WIE
Donawitzer SV Alpine		0–2	0–1	1–1	3–0	2–0	4–0	4–1
Eisenstadt	3–0		2–0	0–1	1–2	1–2	3–0	1–0
First Vienna	3–1	4–1		3–1	1–0	1–1	1–1	1–0
Salzburger AK 1914	1–2	1–2	0–3		0–1	0–2	0–0	0–1
Spittal an der Drau	0–1	2–0	1–1	1–2		2–0	2–1	1–1
VOEST Linz	3–2	0–1	5–0	2–0	2–2		3–1	2–0
Vorwärts Steyr	3–1	1–1	0–0	1–1	1–0	3–0		2–0
Wiener SC	1–1	2–0	6–1	3–0	4–1	0–0	2–0	

Legend: Blue = home team win; Yellow = draw; Red = away team win.
