= Helmut Köglberger =

Austrian footballer (1946–2018)

Personal information
- Date of birth: 12 January 1946
- Place of birth: Steyr, Allied-occupied Austria
- Date of death: 23 September 2018 (aged 72)
- Place of death: Linz, Second Austrian Republic
- Height: 1.73 m (5 ft 8 in)
- Position: Striker

Senior career*
Years	Team	Apps	(Gls)
1962–1964	SK Amateure Steyr		
1964–1968	LASK	70	(40)
1968–1974	Austria/WAC	171	(96)
1975–1981	LASK	219	(99)

International career
1965–1976	Austria	28	(6)

Managerial career
- 2011–2012: LASK II
- * Club domestic league appearances and goals

Helmut Köglberger (12 January 1946 – 23 September 2018) was an Austrian professional footballer who played as a striker. He was the first black player to play for and captain the Austria national team.

Köglberger was the Austrian league top scorer in the 1968–69 and 1974–75 seasons.

== Early life ==
Köglberger was born on 12 January 1946 in Steyr to an African American father and Austrian mother.
