= 1971–72 Austrian football championship =

54th season of top-tier football league in Austria

Austrian Nationalliga
- Season: 1971–72
- Champions: FC Wacker Innsbruck

Statistics of Austrian Nationalliga in the 1971–72 season.

== Overview ==
It was contested by 15 teams, and FC Wacker Innsbruck won the championship.

== League standings ==
Pos	Team	Pld	W	D	L	GF	GA	GD	Pts
1	FC Wacker Innsbruck	28	15	9	4	49	20	+29	39
2	FK Austria Wien	28	17	4	7	49	34	+15	38
3	VÖEST Linz	28	15	5	8	52	26	+26	35
4	SV Austria Salzburg	28	12	11	5	47	29	+18	35
5	SK Rapid Wien	28	12	9	7	39	23	+16	33
6	Donawitzer SV Alpine	28	10	10	8	31	28	+3	30
7	SK Sturm Graz	28	13	4	11	37	39	−2	30
8	Grazer AK	28	9	10	9	32	42	−10	28
9	First Vienna FC	28	9	7	12	30	31	−1	25
10	Wiener Sportclub	28	10	5	13	27	43	−16	25
11	SC Eisenstadt	28	9	6	13	29	30	−1	24
12	Linzer ASK	28	8	8	12	37	39	−2	24
13	FC Admira/Wacker	28	6	12	10	31	39	−8	24
14	1. Simmeringer SC	28	8	6	14	23	48	−25	22
15	SK Bischofshofen	28	1	6	21	22	64	−42	8

Source: rsssf.com

== Results ==
Home \ Away	ADM	ASZ	AWI	BIS	DON	EIS	FIR	GAK	LIN	RWI	SIM	STU	VOE	WKR	WIE
Admira/Wacker		4–3	0–2	0–1	4–0	1–1	1–2	0–0	1–4	0–0	1–1	0–1	0–2	3–2	0–1
Austria Salzburg	1–3		2–0	3–1	1–1	2–0	2–1	1–1	2–2	0–0	6–1	2–1	1–1	1–3	5–0
Austria Wien	1–0	1–1		2–1	2–2	4–1	2–1	3–3	1–3	1–0	1–0	1–3	2–1	0–1	3–2
Bischofshofen	0–1	2–2	1–4		1–3	1–1	2–2	1–1	3–3	0–1	0–1	1–2	2–5	0–2	0–2
Donawitzer SV Alpine	2–2	0–0	2–1	1–0		0–2	1–1	0–0	3–0	0–0	1–0	2–1	2–1	1–0	4–0
Eisenstadt	1–1	0–1	0–2	6–0	0–0		0–1	1–2	3–0	0–3	0–2	1–1	1–0	0–0	0–1
First Vienna	2–2	0–1	1–2	4–1	0–1	1–0		0–1	2–0	2–1	1–2	1–4	0–2	1–0	4–0
Grazer AK	1–1	1–0	0–4	1–0	1–0	0–2	1–1		3–0	2–2	1–2	1–1	3–1	1–2	1–4
Linzer ASK	1–2	1–1	0–0	3–1	1–1	1–2	1–0	3–0		0–1	3–0	0–1	0–3	1–1	1–3
Rapid Wien	1–1	1–1	1–2	3–1	2–2	2–0	0–0	0–1	2–1		1–0	1–0	0–3	1–2	6–1
Simmeringer SC	2–2	1–4	1–3	0–0	1–0	0–4	0–0	0–0	1–1	0–4		1–2	0–3	2–1	3–0
Sturm Graz	1–0	2–2	1–2	1–0	1–0	0–2	0–2	4–3	0–4	3–1	0–1		0–4	2–2	1–0
VÖEST Linz	5–0	0–1	2–3	2–1	2–1	3–0	2–0	3–0	1–0	0–3	3–1	0–2		1–1	1–1
Wacker Innsbruck	1–1	1–0	2–0	5–0	3–1	1–0	2–0	6–1	1–1	0–0	4–0	3–1	0–0		3–1
Wiener SC	0–0	0–1	2–0	3–1	1–0	0–1	0–0	0–2	0–2	0–2	2–0	2–1	1–1	0–0	

Legend: Blue = home team win; Yellow = draw; Red = away team win.
