= 1973–74 Austrian football championship =

56th season of top-tier football league in Austria

Austrian Nationalliga
- Season: 1973–74
- Champions: VÖEST Linz

Statistics of Austrian Nationalliga in the 1973–74 season.

== Overview ==
It was contested by 17 teams, and VÖEST Linz won the championship.

From 1973–74 season, Wiener AC formed a joint team with FK Austria Wien, which was called FK Austria WAC Wien until 1976–77 season when Austria Wien decided to revert to their own club's traditional name. The results of the joint team are part of the Austria Wien football history.

== League standings ==
Pos	Team	Pld	W	D	L	GF	GA	GD	Pts
1	VÖEST Linz	32	18	11	3	51	28	+23	47
2	FC Wacker Innsbruck	32	19	8	5	57	21	+36	46
3	SK Rapid Wien	32	18	9	5	74	33	+41	45
4	FK Austria WAC Wien	32	16	7	9	59	37	+22	39
5	SK Sturm Graz	32	14	6	12	28	35	−7	34
6	Donawitzer SV Alpine	32	13	7	12	51	48	+3	33
7	FC Admira/Wacker	32	11	9	12	50	48	+2	31
8	SV Austria Salzburg	32	10	11	11	35	35	0	31
9	Linzer ASK	32	11	8	13	38	48	−10	30
10	Wiener Sportclub	32	10	9	13	43	60	−17	29
11	1. Simmeringer SC	32	10	8	14	49	47	+2	28
12	Grazer AK	32	9	10	13	31	41	−10	28
13	SC Eisenstadt	32	11	6	15	36	52	−16	28
14	Austria Klagenfurt	32	8	11	13	33	44	−11	27
15	Radenthein/Villacher SV	32	6	14	12	33	40	−7	26
16	First Vienna FC	32	8	8	16	38	54	−16	24
17	FC Vorarlberg	32	5	8	19	31	66	−35	18

Source: rsssf.com

== Results ==
Home \ Away	ADM	KLA	ASZ	AWI	DON	EIS	FIR	GAK	LIN	RAD	RWI	SIM	STU	VOE	VOR	WKR	WIE
Admira/Wacker		1–2	0–3	3–2	3–1	0–0	1–2	4–1	2–1	1–1	2–4	1–7	0–1	4–0	2–1	2–2	1–2
Austria Klagenfurt	0–3		0–1	2–2	2–3	4–1	1–0	0–2	2–2	1–0	2–3	2–1	0–1	1–1	1–0	2–4	0–0
Austria Salzburg	1–1	1–1		2–4	1–2	1–0	3–0	2–1	2–1	0–0	1–3	3–0	0–1	1–1	0–1	0–2	2–2
Austria WAC Wien	0–0	2–0	0–0		2–0	2–0	4–1	1–1	0–0	2–2	3–1	2–1	1–2	0–1	3–0	2–1	2–0
Donawitzer SV Alpine	1–3	1–0	3–0	4–1		3–1	0–2	0–1	1–0	1–1	4–6	1–1	0–1	1–4	5–0	0–0	3–1
Eisenstadt	0–3	2–1	0–1	0–3	2–1		2–0	2–1	2–1	1–6	1–1	0–1	0–1	1–3	4–2	1–3	2–1
First Vienna	2–0	0–0	4–0	1–2	2–2	3–2		0–5	0–2	4–1	1–2	1–1	0–1	1–1	1–1	0–1	0–4
Grazer AK	1–0	1–2	1–1	0–2	0–0	1–1	1–1		1–0	1–1	1–1	0–0	0–0	0–2	1–2	0–3	3–1
Linzer ASK	1–1	0–0	1–1	0–6	2–0	0–3	4–2	4–1		0–0	2–1	2–1	1–3	0–2	1–0	1–5	3–0
Radenthein/Villacher SV	2–2	0–0	1–0	0–1	0–4	2–3	2–2	0–1	1–1		0–0	3–1	2–0	0–2	0–0	1–4	1–1
Rapid Wien	1–0	4–0	0–3	4–0	1–1	4–0	3–0	2–0	6–0	1–0		1–1	4–0	0–2	1–1	0–0	4–2
Simmeringer SC	1–2	3–4	1–0	2–1	4–1	1–1	1–2	3–1	2–0	2–0	1–2		2–0	0–3	4–0	1–4	2–2
Sturm Graz	1–1	0–0	1–0	0–4	0–1	0–1	2–0	0–0	0–2	0–3	1–0	3–2		0–1	0–3	0–2	1–2
VÖEST Linz	3–2	3–3	1–1	3–2	1–1	0–0	2–0	1–0	0–3	0–0	2–2	1–0	0–0		1–0	3–0	5–0
Vorarlberg	2–4	1–0	1–1	2–2	2–3	1–2	1–5	1–2	3–2	1–3	1–6	0–0	1–3	0–1		0–4	2–2
Wacker Innsbruck	1–0	0–0	1–1	2–1	0–2	1–0	0–0	0–2	0–1	1–0	0–0	2–0	0–0	4–0	2–1		6–0
Wiener SC	1–1	1–0	0–2	2–0	4–1	0–2	2–1	4–0	0–0	2–0	1–6	2–2	2–5	1–1	1–0	0–2	

Legend: Blue = home team win; Yellow = draw; Red = away team win.
