= 1919–20 Austrian First Class =

9th season of top-tier football league in Austria

Austrian First Class
- Season: 1919–20
- Champions: SK Rapid Wien (6th Austrian title)
- Matches played: 132
- Goals scored: 453 (3.43 per match)
- Top goalscorer: Ernst Winker (23 goals)

The 1919–20 Austrian First Class season was the ninth season of top-tier football in Austria. With the league expanded to a twelve team competition, it was won by SK Rapid Wien by goal average over SV Amateure.

== League standings ==
Pos	Team	Pld	W	D	L	GF	GA	GD	Pts
1	SK Rapid Wien	22	15	3	4	71	29	+42	33
2	SV Amateure	22	14	5	3	55	24	+31	33
3	Wiener Sportclub	22	13	4	5	37	28	+9	30
4	Floridsdorfer AC	22	11	6	5	36	24	+12	28
5	SC Rudolfshügel	22	11	3	8	42	30	+12	25
6	Wiener AC	22	8	6	8	31	36	−5	22
7	1. Simmeringer SC	22	8	5	9	39	44	−5	21
8	SC Wacker	22	6	5	11	27	48	−21	17
9	ASV Hertha	22	6	4	12	24	33	−9	16
10	First Vienna FC	22	4	7	11	36	47	−11	15
11	Wiener AF	22	4	5	13	30	43	−13	13
12	SK Admira Wien	22	3	5	14	25	67	−42	11

Source: rsssf.com

== Results ==
Home \ Away	ADM	AMA	FIR	FLO	HER	RAP	RUD	SIM	WAK	WAC	WAF	SPO
SK Admira Wien		1–4	1–4	0–4	1–2	2–5	0–3	1–0	0–0	1–2	2–1	0–2
SV Amateure	4–2		3–2	2–2	3–1	2–3	6–0	4–1	2–0	3–0	2–0	2–2
First Vienna	2–2	1–3		1–1	2–2	1–1	1–5	3–3	2–3	3–0	0–2	2–3
Floridsdorfer AC	0–0	1–1	1–2		1–0	1–0	1–0	4–1	3–1	4–0	4–2	1–2
ASV Hertha	3–1	0–2	1–0	1–1		1–2	0–2	0–1	3–0	1–1	4–0	2–1
SK Rapid Wien	11–2	1–2	1–1	2–0	4–1		3–1	2–1	9–2	4–2	4–2	1–0
SC Rudolfshügel	0–2	1–1	4–2	5–0	1–0	4–2		2–0	2–2	1–2	1–1	0–1
Simmeringer SC	1–1	1–0	1–4	1–0	3–1	2–5	4–2		6–1	1–0	3–3	0–3
SC Wacker	6–1	2–4	4–1	1–2	0–0	0–4	0–2	1–1		0–2	1–0	0–0
Wiener AC	4–1	1–0	4–1	2–2	3–1	0–0	0–4	2–2	0–2		1–1	3–1
Wiener AF	7–2	0–3	1–1	0–1	3–0	2–0	1–2	1–3	0–1	2–2		0–1
Wiener Sportclub	2–2	2–2	1–0	0–2	1–0	0–7	1–0	4–3	4–0	1–0	5–1	

Legend: Blue = home team win; Yellow = draw; Red = away team win.
