= 1982–83 Austrian Football Bundesliga =

65th season of top-tier football league in Austria

Austrian Bundesliga
- Season: 1982–83
- Champions: SK Rapid Wien

Statistics of Austrian Football Bundesliga in the 1982–83 season.

== Overview ==
It was contested by 16 teams, and SK Rapid Wien won the championship.

=== Teams and location ===
Location of teams in the 1982–83 Austrian Football Bundesliga

Teams of 1982–83 Austrian Football Bundesliga

- 1. Simmeringer
- FC Admira/Wacker
- Austria Salzburg
- Austria Wien
- Eisenstadt
- First Vienna
- Grazer AK
- Kärnten
- LASK
- Neusiedl
- Rapid Wien
- Sturm Graz
- Union Wels
- VÖEST Linz
- Wacker Innsbruck
- Wiener Sport-Club

== League standings ==
Pos	Team	Pld	W	D	L	GF	GA	GD	Pts
1	SK Rapid Wien	30	20	8	2	72	18	+54	48
2	FK Austria Wien	30	22	4	4	76	27	+49	48
3	FC Wacker Innsbruck	30	13	12	5	55	36	+19	38
4	SK Sturm Graz	30	16	5	9	50	33	+17	37
5	SV Austria Salzburg	30	14	6	10	45	34	+11	34
6	Austria Klagenfurt	30	13	6	11	52	49	+3	32
7	Grazer AK	30	12	8	10	40	40	0	32
8	VÖEST Linz	30	12	8	10	41	42	−1	32
9	SC Eisenstadt	30	8	13	9	41	48	−7	29
10	FC Admira/Wacker	30	9	9	12	42	47	−5	27
11	Wiener Sportclub	30	10	7	13	44	60	−16	27
12	Linzer ASK	30	9	7	14	42	49	−7	25
13	SC Neusiedl	30	7	7	16	29	49	−20	21
14	Union Wels	30	6	8	16	27	46	−19	20
15	First Vienna FC	30	7	5	18	25	61	−36	19
16	1. Simmeringer SC	30	2	7	21	20	62	−42	11

Source: rsssf.com

== Results ==
Home \ Away	ADM	KLA	ASZ	AWI	EIS	FIR	GAK	LIN	NEU	RWI	SIM	STU	WEL	VOE	WKR	WIE
Admira/Wacker		1–1	1–0	1–4	1–1	3–0	0–0	3–0	1–0	0–0	3–1	4–0	4–2	1–1	2–2	3–0
Austria Klagenfurt	2–1		5–2	1–2	0–0	2–1	2–0	3–1	0–0	1–3	4–0	3–2	2–0	1–3	3–1	5–0
Austria Salzburg	3–0	2–1		0–2	6–2	1–0	2–0	4–1	3–0	0–0	3–0	2–0	0–0	1–1	1–0	5–0
Austria Wien	4–1	1–0	0–1		2–2	5–1	1–0	1–0	8–0	0–3	2–2	4–2	4–0	5–1	6–1	3–1
Eisenstadt	1–1	2–3	0–0	0–1		0–0	1–0	3–1	1–1	0–4	3–1	1–2	2–2	0–0	3–3	1–2
First Vienna	1–0	3–0	1–1	1–3	0–0		0–1	1–0	2–1	0–3	0–0	1–4	2–1	1–0	0–4	2–1
Grazer AK	3–2	2–4	2–0	3–0	0–2	7–0		5–2	2–1	0–4	0–0	2–1	1–0	1–0	0–0	0–0
Linzer ASK	3–0	1–1	1–0	1–5	2–3	2–0	3–3		2–0	3–0	4–2	0–0	2–0	4–0	1–2	2–1
Neusiedl	1–1	4–0	0–2	0–1	1–3	4–0	1–2	2–2		2–1	4–1	0–4	1–0	3–1	1–1	2–1
Rapid Wien	2–0	2–2	5–2	0–0	5–1	2–1	2–0	0–0	4–0		3–0	2–1	1–0	4–0	1–1	5–1
Simmeringer SC	2–3	0–1	1–0	0–4	2–3	1–1	0–1	1–1	1–0	1–4		0–2	0–0	0–1	1–2	0–2
Sturm Graz	4–1	3–1	4–1	0–1	4–0	2–1	1–0	1–0	1–0	0–0	1–0		3–1	2–0	1–1	0–0
Union Wels	3–0	3–0	0–1	1–2	0–0	3–1	1–1	3–1	1–0	0–3	1–1	0–1		1–1	2–2	2–0
VOEST Linz	3–2	3–1	3–0	1–3	1–1	3–1	1–1	2–0	0–0	0–3	4–1	2–1	3–0		2–0	1–1
Wacker Innsbruck	0–0	4–1	3–1	1–1	1–0	3–0	2–2	1–1	3–0	2–2	1–0	3–1	4–0	3–1		3–0
Wiener SC	3–2	2–2	1–1	2–1	2–5	4–3	7–1	2–1	0–0	0–4	4–1	2–2	3–0	0–2	2–1	

Legend: Blue = home team win; Yellow = draw; Red = away team win.
