= 1916–17 Austrian First Class =

6th season of top-tier football league in Austria

Austrian First Class
- Season: 1916–17
- Champions: SK Rapid Wien (4th Austrian title)
- Matches played: 90
- Goals scored: 414 (4.6 per match)
- Top goalscorer: Eduard Bauer; Leopold Neubauer (21 goals)

The 1916–17 Austrian First Class season was the sixth season of top-tier football in Austria. It was won by SK Rapid Wien who would finish two points ahead of second place Floridsdorfer AC.

== League standings ==
Pos	Team	Pld	W	D	L	GF	GA	GD	Pts
1	SK Rapid Wien	18	13	3	2	64	28	+36	29
2	Floridsdorfer AC	18	12	3	3	55	17	+38	27
3	SC Rudolfshügel	18	12	3	3	49	30	+19	27
4	Wiener AF	18	11	3	4	61	32	+29	25
5	SC Wacker	18	7	4	7	36	38	−2	18
6	Wiener AC	18	7	4	7	34	40	−6	18
7	Wiener Sportclub	18	6	2	10	36	42	−6	14
8	SV Amateure	18	3	3	12	34	47	−13	9
9	1. Simmeringer SC	18	3	1	14	25	64	−39	7
10	ASV Hertha	18	1	4	13	20	76	−56	6

Source: rsssf.com

== Results ==
Home \ Away	AMA	FLO	HER	RAP	RUD	SIM	WAK	WAC	WAF	SPO
SV Amateure		0–4	2–2	1–2	2–4	7–2	1–2	2–2	1–2	7–0
Floridsdorfer AC	8–0		6–0	2–1	4–0	1–0	0–0	2–2	1–1	6–1
ASV Hertha	2–1	1–2		1–7	1–1	0–5	4–4	0–0	2–8	1–7
SK Rapid Wien	4–1	2–1	8–0		2–4	6–3	4–0	3–1	1–1	2–0
SC Rudolfshügel	2–0	2–1	6–1	3–3		3–0	3–2	3–1	0–0	3–1
Simmeringer SC	1–0	1–2	3–1	2–5	1–3		1–2	0–2	1–8	1–1
SC Wacker	5–4	0–1	5–1	4–4	0–4	3–1		0–1	1–2	2–1
Wiener AC	1–1	1–5	4–2	0–4	4–3	4–1	2–3		5–2	3–0
Wiener AF	2–3	1–7	3–0	3–4	7–3	7–0	3–2	6–0		2–0
Wiener Sportclub	2–1	4–2	4–1	1–2	0–2	9–2	1–1	3–1	1–3	

Source: Almanacco Illustrato del Calcio - La Storia 1898-2004, Panini Edizioni, Modena, September 2005 (in Italian)
Legend: Blue = home team win; Yellow = draw; Red = away team win.
