= 1992–93 Austrian Football Bundesliga =

75th season of top-tier football league in Austria

Austrian Bundesliga
- Season: 1992–93
- Champions: FK Austria Wien

Statistics of Austrian Football Bundesliga in the 1992–93 season.

== Overview ==
The fall season was contested by 12 teams, and the top eight teams went to the Meister playoff. The last four teams fought in the Mittlere Playoff with the top four Austrian Football First League teams.

FK Austria Wien won the championship.

=== Teams and location ===
Location of teams in the 1992–93 Austrian Football Bundesliga

Teams of 1992–93 Austrian Football Bundesliga

- FC Admira/Wacker
- Austria Salzburg
- Austria Wien
- LASK
- VfB Mödling
- Rapid Wien
- Sankt Pölten
- Stahl Linz
- Sturm Graz
- Vorwärts Steyr
- Wiener Sport-Club
- Wacker Innsbruck

== Autumn season ==
=== Table ===
Pos	Team	Pld	W	D	L	GF	GA	GD	Pts
1	Austria Salzburg	22	11	7	4	45	27	+18	29
2	Wacker Innsbruck	22	10	8	4	45	22	+23	28
3	Austria Wien	22	12	4	6	47	25	+22	28
4	Wiener SC	22	11	5	6	31	33	−2	27
5	Rapid Wien	22	9	8	5	34	26	+8	26
6	Admira/Wacker	22	11	3	8	47	33	+14	25
7	VSE St. Pölten	22	6	10	6	34	37	−3	22
8	Vorwärts Steyr	22	8	6	8	30	34	−4	22
9	VfB Mödling	22	8	3	11	39	41	−2	19
10	Linzer ASK	22	4	6	12	21	46	−25	14
11	Stahl Linz	22	3	6	13	20	43	−23	12
12	Sturm Graz	22	3	6	13	23	49	−26	12

Source: rsssf.com

=== Results ===
Home \ Away	ADM	ASZ	AWI	LIN	RWI	STA	STU	MÖD	VOR	StP	WKR	WIE
Admira/Wacker		1–2	3–1	1–0	4–3	3–1	6–0	3–1	3–1	3–0	4–0	1–3
Austria Salzburg	4–1		2–1	1–1	2–2	4–0	3–0	3–0	2–1	2–2	1–1	0–1
Austria Wien	3–2	3–2		5–1	1–2	4–0	3–0	5–0	4–1	1–3	2–2	3–1
Linzer ASK	2–2	1–3	1–0		0–1	0–2	0–2	1–0	2–2	0–3	1–2	1–1
Rapid Wien	2–1	2–2	0–0	5–1		2–1	1–0	1–0	0–1	4–1	4–2	1–2
Stahl Linz	1–3	0–1	0–0	0–1	1–1		3–3	1–3	2–0	1–1	2–1	0–0
Sturm Graz	0–0	1–2	1–1	1–2	2–0	3–3		1–1	1–3	3–1	1–3	0–3
VfB Mödling	4–1	4–2	0–3	5–0	1–1	3–1	1–1		3–1	5–2	0–5	5–0
Vorwärts Steyr	2–1	1–1	0–1	2–0	0–0	3–1	3–1	3–2		0–2	0–0	1–0
VSE St. Pölten	1–1	1–1	1–3	2–2	1–1	3–0	3–2	1–0	3–3		0–0	0–0
Wacker Innsbruck	2–0	2–0	1–2	3–3	0–0	3–0	4–0	3–0	4–1	1–1		6–0
Wiener SC	0–3	1–5	2–1	3–1	3–1	1–0	3–0	2–1	1–1	4–2	0–0	

Legend: Blue = home team win; Yellow = draw; Red = away team win.

== Spring season ==
=== Championship playoff ===
==== Table ====
Pos	Team	Pld	W	D	L	GF	GA	GD	Pts
1	Austria Wien	36	22	6	8	81	35	+46	36
2	Austria Salzburg	36	20	10	6	69	33	+36	36
3	Admira/Wacker	36	17	6	13	72	54	+18	28
4	Rapid Wien	36	15	10	11	53	51	+2	27
5	Wacker Innsbruck	36	14	12	10	63	43	+20	26
6	VSE St. Pölten	36	9	16	11	51	61	−10	23
7	Wiener SC	36	14	8	14	47	67	−20	23
8	Vorwärts Steyr	36	10	9	17	37	53	−16	18

Source: rsssf.com

==== Results ====
Home \ Away	ADM	ASZ	AWI	RWI	VOR	StP	WKR	WIE
Admira/Wacker		2–2	0–3	1–2	1–1	2–0	0–0	4–1
Austria Salzburg	1–0		1–3	1–0	2–0	1–0	5–0	4–0
Austria Wien	1–3	0–0		4–0	1–0	7–1	2–0	4–1
Rapid Wien	4–0	1–0	1–5		3–1	2–2	2–3	1–1
Vorwärts Steyr	0–3	0–2	1–0	0–1		1–2	0–2	2–0
VSE St. Pölten	0–4	0–0	0–0	5–0	1–0		3–3	3–3
Wacker Innsbruck	2–4	0–2	0–1	2–0	0–0	0–0		5–0
Wiener SC	4–1	0–3	2–3	0–2	1–1	1–0	2–1	

Legend: Blue = home team win; Yellow = draw; Red = away team win.

=== Promotion/relegation playoff ===
==== Table ====
Pos	Team	Pld	W	D	L	GF	GA	GD	Pts
1	VfB Mödling	14	11	2	1	26	6	+20	24
2	Sturm Graz	14	8	2	4	26	12	+14	18
3	Linzer ASK	14	5	6	3	11	8	+3	16
4	Grazer AK (Note: Belongs to Austrian Football First League)	14	4	7	3	20	13	+7	15
5	Leoben	14	3	5	6	14	18	−4	11
6	Stahl Linz	14	3	4	7	12	16	−4	10
7	Ried	14	4	1	9	14	26	−12	9
8	Favoritner AC	14	3	3	8	10	34	−24	9

Source: rsssf.com

==== Results ====
Home \ Away	FAV	GAK	LEO	LIN	RIE	STA	STU	MÖD
Favoritner AC		1–1	1–1	0–1	2–0	0–3	0–2	0–3
Grazer AK	1–1		2–2	1–1	2–0	1–1	2–0	0–0
Leoben	1–1	2–2		3–1	1–2	1–1	1–0	0–2
Linzer ASK	1–0	1–1	1–3		1–0	2–0	0–0	0–1
Ried	0–2	0–2	2–1	0–1		0–2	1–3	0–1
Stahl Linz	3–0	1–1	1–1	0–2	2–0		2–0	0–1
Sturm Graz	2–0	0–2	0–1	0–0	3–1	3–1		0–1
VfB Mödling	3–0	0–0	2–0	1–0	1–0	1–0	1–0	

Legend: Blue = home team win; Yellow = draw; Red = away team win.
