= 1974–75 Austrian Football Bundesliga =

57th season of top-tier football league in Austria

Austrian Bundesliga
- Season: 1974–75
- Champions: FC Wacker Innsbruck
- Relegated: SC Eisenstadt
- European Cup: FC Wacker Innsbruck
- Cup Winners' Cup: SK Sturm Graz
- UEFA Cup: VÖEST Linz; SK Rapid Wien
- Matches: 180
- Goals: 493 (2.74 per match)
- Top goalscorer: Helmut Köglberger (22 goals)

The 1974–75 Austrian Football Bundesliga was the 1st season of the Bundesliga, Austria's premier football league. It was contested by 10 teams, and Wacker Innsbruck won the championship for its fourth time in history.

== Teams and locations ==
Location of teams in the 1974–75 Austrian Football Bundesliga
- FC Admira/Wacker
- Austria Salzburg
- Austria Wien
- Kärnten
- LASK
- Rapid Wien
- SC Eisenstadt
- Sturm Graz
- VÖEST Linz
- Wacker Innsbruck

== Standings ==
| Pos | Team | Pld | W | D | L | GF | GA | GD | Pts |
|---|---|---|---|---|---|---|---|---|---|
| 1 | Wacker Innsbruck | 36 | 24 | 3 | 9 | 76 | 36 | +40 | 51 |
| 2 | VÖEST Linz | 36 | 16 | 10 | 10 | 51 | 33 | +18 | 42 |
| 3 | Rapid Wien | 36 | 16 | 9 | 11 | 57 | 41 | +16 | 41 |
| 4 | FK Austria WAC Wien | 36 | 14 | 9 | 13 | 59 | 52 | +7 | 37 |
| 5 | Sturm Graz | 36 | 13 | 10 | 13 | 46 | 45 | +1 | 36 |
| 6 | Linzer ASK | 36 | 12 | 10 | 14 | 50 | 55 | −5 | 34 |
| 7 | Austria Salzburg | 36 | 12 | 9 | 15 | 41 | 54 | −13 | 33 |
| 8 | FC Admira/Wacker | 36 | 11 | 9 | 16 | 46 | 55 | −9 | 31 |
| 9 | Austria Klagenfurt | 36 | 11 | 6 | 19 | 32 | 57 | −25 | 28 |
| 10 | SC Eisenstadt | 36 | 8 | 11 | 17 | 35 | 65 | −30 | 27 |

== Results ==
Teams played each other four times in the league. In the first half of the season each team played every other team twice (home and away), and then did the same in the second half of the season.

=== First half of season ===
| Home \ Away | ADM | KLA | ASZ | AWI | EIS | LIN | RWI | STU | VOE | WKR |
|---|---|---|---|---|---|---|---|---|---|---|
| Admira/Wacker | | 1–2 | 1–1 | 3–2 | 6–1 | 3–1 | 0–3 | 3–1 | 1–1 | 4–1 |
| Austria Klagenfurt | 2–0 | | 2–1 | 2–2 | 3–1 | 2–1 | 0–1 | 1–0 | 2–1 | 0–1 |
| Austria Salzburg | 1–0 | 2–1 | | 1–1 | 1–0 | 1–1 | 0–0 | 1–0 | 0–0 | 0–4 |
| Austria WAC Wien | 6–1 | 3–1 | 4–0 | | 1–0 | 1–0 | 1–3 | 2–2 | 1–0 | 4–1 |
| Eisenstadt | 0–0 | 1–0 | 0–5 | 1–1 | | 2–2 | 0–1 | 3–1 | 1–1 | 3–2 |
| Linzer ASK | 0–1 | 2–0 | 3–3 | 2–2 | 2–1 | | 2–1 | 1–2 | 1–2 | 1–5 |
| Rapid Wien | 0–0 | 2–1 | 5–0 | 2–0 | 5–1 | 5–0 | | 5–0 | 2–1 | 1–1 |
| Sturm Graz | 3–1 | 2–2 | 2–0 | 3–0 | 1–2 | 1–1 | 1–1 | | 2–1 | 1–0 |
| VÖEST Linz | 1–1 | 3–1 | 1–2 | 3–1 | 2–2 | 2–0 | 2–1 | 2–0 | | 1–0 |
| Wacker Innsbruck | 3–2 | 1–0 | 6–0 | 3–0 | 1–0 | 2–0 | 2–0 | 2–0 | 1–2 | |

Legend: Blue = home team win; Yellow = draw; Red = away team win.

=== Second half of season ===
| Home \ Away | ADM | KLA | ASZ | AWI | EIS | LIN | RWI | STU | VOE | WKR |
|---|---|---|---|---|---|---|---|---|---|---|
| Admira/Wacker | | 3–1 | 2–1 | 1–0 | 0–1 | 0–3 | 1–1 | 2–0 | 0–0 | 2–3 |
| Austria Klagenfurt | 1–0 | | 0–2 | 1–0 | 1–0 | 0–1 | 1–1 | 1–1 | 1–0 | 1–4 |
| Austria Salzburg | 0–0 | 4–0 | | 0–1 | 3–1 | 1–0 | 1–0 | 0–2 | 1–1 | 0–2 |
| Austria WAC Wien | 3–0 | 3–1 | 3–2 | | 1–2 | 2–3 | 1–0 | 2–4 | 0–0 | 2–2 |
| Eisenstadt | 1–1 | 0–0 | 2–1 | 1–1 | | 2–0 | 0–3 | 1–1 | 0–3 | 1–4 |
| Linzer ASK | 2–1 | 1–0 | 3–1 | 3–3 | 3–0 | | 1–1 | 3–0 | 2–2 | 1–1 |
| Rapid Wien | 0–3 | 1–1 | 2–1 | 1–3 | 3–3 | 0–1 | | 2–1 | 0–3 | 3–2 |
| Sturm Graz | 4–1 | 2–0 | 0–0 | 2–0 | 1–1 | 0–0 | 4–0 | | 1–0 | 0–2 |
| VÖEST Linz | 2–1 | 6–0 | 3–2 | 0–2 | 1–0 | 2–1 | 0–1 | 0–0 | | 0–1 |
| Wacker Innsbruck | 3–0 | 3–0 | 1–2 | 1–0 | 3–0 | 3–2 | 2–0 | 2–1 | 1–2 | |

Legend: Blue = home team win; Yellow = draw; Red = away team win.

== Bundesliga teams in Europe ==
| Club | Competition | GP | W | D | L | Note |
|---|---|---|---|---|---|---|
| VÖEST Linz | European Cup | 2 | 0 | 1 | 1 | Eliminated in the first round. |
| Austria Wien | European Cup Winners' Cup | 4 | 1 | 1 | 2 | Eliminated in second round. |
| Wacker Innsbruck | UEFA Cup | 2 | 1 | 0 | 1 | Eliminated in the first round. |
| Sturm Graz | UEFA Cup | 2 | 1 | 0 | 1 | Eliminated in the first round on away goals. |
| Rapid Wien | UEFA Cup | 4 | 1 | 1 | 2 | Eliminated in second round. |
| Total | UEFA Cup | 8 | 3 | 1 | 4 | 3 clubs in UEFA Cup. |
| Total | | 14 | 4 | 3 | 7 | 5 teams in Europe. |
