= Lazar Lemić =

Yugoslav footballer (1937–2014)

Personal information
- Full name: Lazar Lemić
- Date of birth: 20 September 1937
- Place of birth: Bačka Palanka, Kingdom of Yugoslavia
- Date of death: 16 February 2014 (aged 76)
- Height: 1.75 m (5 ft 9 in)
- Position: Midfielder

Youth career
- Bačka

Senior career*
Years	Team	Apps	(Gls)
1959–1964	Novi Sad	98	(20)
1964–1966	Željezničar Sarajevo	31	(3)
1966–1967	Fenerbahçe	16	(2)
1967–1969	Bačka	29	(5)
Total		174	(30)

International career
1964	Yugoslavia	2	(0)
- * Club domestic league appearances and goals

Lazar Lemić (Serbian Cyrillic: Лазар Лемић; 20 September 1937 – 16 February 2014) was a Yugoslav professional footballer who played as a midfielder.

== Club career ==
After starting out at Bačka, Lemić spent most of his career with Novi Sad, helping the club win promotion to the Yugoslav First League in 1961. He also played for Željezničar Sarajevo from 1964 to 1966, before moving abroad to Turkey. Following his stint at Fenerbahçe, Lemić returned to his parent club Bačka, competing for two seasons in the Yugoslav Second League.

== International career ==
At international level, Lemić was capped twice for Yugoslavia. He represented the nation at the 1964 Summer Olympics.

== Career statistics ==
=== Club ===
Appearances and goals by club, season and competition
Club	Season	League		
Club	Season	Division	Apps	Goals
Novi Sad	1959–60	Yugoslav Second League	19	3
Novi Sad	1960–61	Yugoslav Second League	13	4
Novi Sad	1961–62	Yugoslav First League	22	3
Novi Sad	1962–63	Yugoslav First League	24	6
Novi Sad	1963–64	Yugoslav First League	20	4
Novi Sad	Total		98	20
Željezničar Sarajevo	1964–65	Yugoslav First League	17	1
Željezničar Sarajevo	1965–66	Yugoslav First League	14	2
Željezničar Sarajevo	Total		31	3
Fenerbahçe	1966–67	Turkish First Football League	16	2
Bačka	1967–68	Yugoslav Second League	22	4
Bačka	1968–69	Yugoslav Second League	7	1
Bačka	Total		29	5
Career total			174	30

=== International ===
Appearances and goals by national team and year
National team	Year	Apps	Goals
Yugoslavia	1964	2	0
Total		2	0

== Honours ==
Novi Sad

- Yugoslav Second League: 1960–61
