= 1969–70 Austrian football championship =

52nd season of top-tier football league in Austria

Austrian Nationalliga
- Season: 1969–70
- Champions: FK Austria Wien

Statistics of Austrian Nationalliga in the 1969–70 season.

== Overview ==
It was contested by 16 teams, and FK Austria Wien won the championship.

== League standings ==
Pos	Team	Pld	W	D	L	GF	GA	GD	Pts
1	FK Austria Wien	30	19	7	4	63	31	+32	45
2	Wiener Sportclub	30	16	6	8	63	34	+29	38
3	SK Sturm Graz	30	14	8	8	43	34	+9	36
4	Linzer ASK	30	13	8	9	41	27	+14	34
5	FC Wacker Innsbruck	30	14	5	11	52	38	+14	33
6	SK Rapid Wien	30	12	7	11	52	35	+17	31
7	SV Wattens	30	12	7	11	45	35	+10	31
8	SV Austria Salzburg	30	12	7	11	45	38	+7	31
9	First Vienna FC	30	8	14	8	35	43	−8	30
10	SK Admira Wien Energie	30	11	6	13	38	45	−7	28
11	SC Wacker	30	11	6	13	55	69	−14	28
12	VÖEST Linz	30	11	6	13	31	48	−17	28
13	Grazer AK	30	8	11	11	37	35	+2	27
14	SC Eisenstadt	30	7	8	15	40	63	−23	22
15	Austria Klagenfurt	30	5	11	14	26	51	−25	21
16	FC Dornbirn	30	4	9	17	23	63	−40	17

Source: rsssf.com

== Results ==
Home \ Away	ADM	KLA	ASZ	AWI	DOR	EIS	FIR	GAK	LIN	RWI	STU	VOE	WIN	WAK	WAT	WIE
Admira Wien Energie		2–3	0–4	0–0	1–0	1–1	1–2	3–0	0–2	1–1	3–1	0–2	2–0	2–4	3–1	0–4
Austria Klagenfurt	1–1		0–4	1–2	4–1	1–1	0–0	0–0	2–2	0–0	1–1	1–2	1–2	1–1	1–4	0–0
Austria Salzburg	1–2	1–0		0–3	4–0	2–1	0–0	0–4	0–2	2–1	0–2	2–0	0–1	5–2	1–0	0–3
Austria Wien	1–0	5–1	1–1		0–1	1–0	4–1	3–1	2–0	6–0	3–6	0–0	2–1	1–0	3–2	2–0
Dornbirn	1–0	1–0	1–1	1–3		0–1	1–2	2–0	1–1	0–6	1–1	1–3	1–3	1–3	1–1	2–4
Eisenstadt	3–3	2–0	1–6	2–4	1–1		0–0	0–3	0–1	0–5	2–0	0–1	0–4	5–2	0–1	1–5
First Vienna	1–1	2–0	1–3	1–1	1–1	1–0		0–0	2–5	1–0	2–3	1–1	1–3	4–3	0–1	1–4
Grazer AK	5–0	1–2	0–1	2–1	3–0	5–3	0–0		0–0	0–2	1–1	2–0	1–1	3–1	0–0	1–1
Linzer ASK	1–0	2–0	1–0	0–0	1–1	1–3	0–0	4–2		0–1	0–1	5–0	0–1	2–0	1–1	0–2
Rapid Wien	1–2	6–0	4–1	2–2	1–1	3–0	0–0	1–1	1–0		2–1	0–1	1–3	2–2	2–1	1–2
Sturm Graz	1–0	2–0	0–0	0–1	4–1	1–3	2–2	0–0	1–1	2–0		2–0	1–0	1–4	1–0	1–1
VÖEST Linz	0–1	0–2	1–1	1–1	0–0	2–2	0–1	1–0	1–4	1–6	1–2		0–5	1–4	1–3	1–0
Wacker Innsbruck	1–2	0–3	1–1	1–4	5–0	2–3	1–1	1–0	1–0	2–0	0–1	0–3		0–0	0–1	3–1
Wacker Wien	0–4	0–0	2–1	2–4	2–1	2–2	4–4	4–1	1–2	2–1	1–3	1–4	3–2		0–6	1–0
Wattens	2–1	0–0	3–2	0–1	3–0	4–2	3–0	1–1	0–3	0–2	2–1	1–2	3–3	0–1		0–1
Wiener SC	1–2	6–1	1–1	4–2	4–0	1–1	1–3	2–0	3–0	1–0	2–0	0–1	2–5	6–3	1–1	

Legend: Blue = home team win; Yellow = draw; Red = away team win.
