= 1984–85 Austrian Football Bundesliga =

67th season of top-tier football league in Austria

Austrian Bundesliga
- Season: 1984–85
- Champions: FK Austria Wien

Statistics of Austrian Football Bundesliga in the 1984–85 season.

== Overview ==
It was contested by 16 teams, and FK Austria Wien won the championship.

=== Teams and location ===
Location of teams in the 1984–85 Austrian Football Bundesliga

Teams of 1984–85 Austrian Football Bundesliga

- FC Admira/Wacker
- Austria Salzburg
- Austria Wien
- Donawitzer SV Alpine
- Eisenstadt
- Favoritner AC
- First Vienna
- Grazer AK
- Kärnten
- LASK
- Rapid Wien
- Spittal/Drau
- Sturm Graz
- VÖEST Linz
- Wacker Innsbruck
- Wiener Sport-Club

== League standings ==
Pos	Team	Pld	W	D	L	GF	GA	GD	Pts
1	FK Austria Wien	30	25	4	1	85	17	+68	54
2	SK Rapid Wien	30	18	9	3	85	30	+55	45
3	Linzer ASK	30	17	4	9	49	37	+12	38
4	FC Wacker Innsbruck	30	12	8	10	51	44	+7	32
5	FC Admira/Wacker	30	11	10	9	49	42	+7	32
6	SK Sturm Graz	30	13	6	11	51	52	−1	32
7	Austria Klagenfurt	30	10	11	9	39	38	+1	31
8	SC Eisenstadt	30	9	10	11	29	31	−2	28
9	VÖEST Linz	30	10	8	12	39	43	−4	28
10	Grazer AK	30	8	12	10	31	35	−4	28
11	Donawitzer SV Alpine	30	11	5	14	38	47	−9	27
12	Wiener Sportclub	30	10	5	15	40	55	−15	25
13	SV Spittal/Drau	30	9	6	15	28	55	−27	24
14	Favoritner AC	30	7	7	16	26	62	−36	21
15	SV Austria Salzburg	30	7	4	19	35	69	−34	18
16	First Vienna FC	30	4	9	17	33	51	−18	17

Source: rsssf.com

== Results ==
Home \ Away	ADM	KLA	ASZ	AWI	DON	EIS	FAV	FIR	GAK	LIN	RWI	SPI	STU	VOE	WKR	WIE
Admira/Wacker		4–0	3–1	0–1	2–0	0–0	2–1	2–1	5–0	1–1	1–4	3–1	2–1	1–0	1–2	2–2
Austria Klagenfurt	1–1		2–2	4–2	2–0	1–1	3–1	4–1	3–0	1–0	1–1	0–0	0–2	2–0	2–1	2–1
Austria Salzburg	0–1	0–0		2–7	0–1	0–3	2–0	2–2	3–1	0–1	0–2	1–1	3–0	1–3	2–3	3–0
Austria Wien	2–0	2–0	4–0		3–0	2–1	6–0	2–0	3–0	2–0	1–0	3–0	4–1	4–0	2–0	5–0
Donawitzer SV Alpine	2–4	2–0	2–0	1–1		4–0	4–1	3–1	1–0	1–1	1–1	3–0	0–0	1–2	1–1	3–0
Eisenstadt	2–0	0–1	1–3	0–1	2–3		2–0	1–1	0–0	2–1	1–1	1–2	5–2	0–0	1–2	1–0
Favoritner AC	2–1	0–0	1–0	0–4	0–1	1–2		0–0	1–1	1–1	2–6	3–0	0–2	4–0	2–2	2–1
First Vienna	1–1	2–2	7–2	1–1	3–0	0–0	0–2		0–0	0–2	0–1	4–0	5–1	0–1	0–1	0–4
Grazer AK	2–0	1–1	4–1	0–3	3–0	0–1	1–1	2–0		4–0	3–3	0–0	0–0	3–1	2–1	2–0
Linzer ASK	2–1	4–3	3–1	0–3	3–0	2–0	3–0	0–0	2–0		0–3	4–0	1–0	3–1	4–0	3–1
Rapid Wien	3–1	2–0	4–0	2–2	2–1	1–1	7–0	5–0	2–1	7–1		4–0	2–2	7–2	1–1	2–0
Spittal an der Drau	1–1	1–0	1–3	1–5	3–1	0–1	0–1	2–1	0–0	3–1	1–0		3–1	0–4	2–0	2–0
Sturm Graz	1–1	2–2	0–1	4–5	4–1	2–0	3–0	4–0	1–1	2–0	2–1	3–2		3–2	2–1	3–2
VOEST Linz	1–1	2–0	4–0	0–1	1–0	0–0	6–0	2–1	0–0	0–1	2–2	0–0	2–1		0–1	1–1
Wacker Innsbruck	3–3	1–1	4–2	0–4	5–0	0–0	0–0	2–1	0–0	0–2	2–4	4–1	5–0	4–1		1–2
Wiener SC	4–4	2–1	4–0	0–0	2–1	1–0	2–0	2–1	2–0	0–3	1–5	3–1	1–2	1–1	1–4	

Legend: Blue = home team win; Yellow = draw; Red = away team win.
