= 1979–80 Austrian Football Bundesliga =

62nd season of top-tier football league in Austria

Austrian Bundesliga
- Season: 1979–80
- Champions: FK Austria Wien

Statistics of Austrian Football Bundesliga in the 1979–80 season.

== Overview ==
It was contested by 10 teams, and FK Austria Wien won the championship.

=== Teams and location ===
Location of teams in the 1979–80 Austrian Football Bundesliga

Teams of 1979–80 Austrian Football Bundesliga

- FC Admira/Wacker
- Austria Salzburg
- Austria Wien
- First Vienna
- Grazer AK
- LASK
- Rapid Wien
- Sturm Graz
- VÖEST Linz
- Wiener Sport-Club

== League standings ==
Pos	Team	Pld	W	D	L	GF	GA	GD	Pts
1	FK Austria Wien	36	20	10	6	84	39	+45	50
2	VÖEST Linz	36	17	9	10	63	41	+22	43
3	Linzer ASK	36	13	17	6	51	34	+17	43
4	Grazer AK	36	15	12	9	45	40	+5	42
5	SK Rapid Wien	36	11	13	12	46	40	+6	35
6	SV Austria Salzburg	36	12	8	16	37	61	−24	32
7	FC Admira/Wacker	36	9	13	14	34	53	−19	31
8	Wiener Sportclub	36	9	11	16	52	59	−7	29
9	SK Sturm Graz	36	8	13	15	41	60	−19	29
10	First Vienna FC	36	10	6	20	40	66	−26	26

Source: rsssf.com

== Results ==
Teams played each other four times in the league. In the first half of the season each team played every other team twice (home and away), and then did the same in the second half of the season.

=== First half of season ===
Home \ Away	ADM	ASZ	AWI	FIR	GAK	LIN	RWI	STU	VOE	WIE
Admira/Wacker		1–1	0–2	3–0	1–1	1–1	2–2	2–0	1–1	1–0
Austria Salzburg	0–1		3–3	3–2	3–1	1–1	0–0	2–1	2–1	1–0
Austria Wien	3–0	3–1		3–1	2–0	1–2	0–0	6–1	2–1	3–2
First Vienna	4–1	0–1	1–6		0–2	1–0	1–0	2–0	3–2	0–0
Grazer AK	2–0	1–0	2–2	2–1		0–0	2–0	1–0	1–1	2–2
Linzer ASK	4–1	2–0	3–2	2–1	1–2		4–1	4–1	3–1	0–0
Rapid Wien	3–0	5–0	0–0	0–0	2–0	0–0		3–0	2–0	1–1
Sturm Graz	3–1	0–2	0–0	2–0	0–1	2–1	0–1		2–1	2–2
VOEST Linz	0–0	2–0	3–1	3–0	3–1	1–2	4–0	0–0		4–1
Wiener SC	0–0	6–0	2–2	2–1	2–3	4–1	3–0	0–3	1–2	

Legend: Blue = home team win; Yellow = draw; Red = away team win.

=== Second half of season ===
Home \ Away	ADM	ASZ	AWI	FIR	GAK	LIN	RWI	STU	VOE	WIE
Admira/Wacker		1–0	2–0	0–0	1–2	1–1	1–1	1–2	1–3	3–2
Austria Salzburg	1–0		2–1	3–1	1–2	1–3	2–1	0–0	1–2	2–1
Austria Wien	5–0	7–0		3–0	2–0	0–0	3–2	3–1	2–1	2–1
First Vienna	0–1	1–1	1–6		4–3	4–2	4–0	1–1	1–3	1–0
Grazer AK	1–1	2–0	1–1	1–0		0–0	1–1	1–1	0–1	2–0
Linzer ASK	4–1	0–0	1–1	1–0	0–0		0–0	2–2	0–0	3–0
Rapid Wien	1–2	4–1	1–1	0–1	3–1	0–0		3–0	5–0	0–0
Sturm Graz	2–2	1–1	0–2	3–0	1–1	1–1	3–1		1–1	2–4
VOEST Linz	0–0	2–1	4–0	3–0	3–1	1–1	1–0	5–1		1–2
Wiener SC	1–0	2–0	0–4	3–3	0–2	2–1	2–3	2–2	2–2	

Legend: Blue = home team win; Yellow = draw; Red = away team win.

== Attendances ==
#	Football club	Average attendance
1	Linzer ASK	9,306
2	Rapid Wien	8,128
3	Austria Wien	7,946
4	Grazer AK	7,861
5	Austria Salzburg	6,989
6	VÖEST Linz	6,522
7	First Vienna	6,111
8	Sturm Graz	5,750
9	Wiener SC	4,956
10	Admira	3,056
