= 1968–69 Austrian football championship =

51st season of top-tier football league in Austria

Austrian Nationalliga
- Season: 1968–69
- Champions: FK Austria Wien

Statistics of Austrian Nationalliga in the 1968–69 season.

== Overview ==
It was contested by 15 teams, and FK Austria Wien won the championship.

== League standings ==
Pos	Team	Pld	W	D	L	GF	GA	GD	Pts
1	FK Austria Wien	28	19	8	1	80	35	+45	46
2	Wiener Sportclub	28	13	12	3	62	21	+41	38
3	SK Rapid Wien	28	15	5	8	64	34	+30	35
4	Linzer ASK	28	12	7	9	38	33	+5	31
5	SK Sturm Graz	28	12	7	9	33	29	+4	31
6	SV Austria Salzburg	28	10	10	8	41	28	+13	30
7	FC Wacker Innsbruck	28	12	5	11	46	43	+3	29
8	SK Admira Wien Energie	28	11	6	11	43	45	−2	28
9	Austria Klagenfurt	28	10	8	10	38	41	−3	28
10	Grazer AK	28	10	6	12	37	54	−17	26
11	SC Wacker	28	9	6	13	39	51	−12	24
12	SV Wattens	28	7	8	13	32	55	−23	22
13	SC Eisenstadt	28	6	9	13	33	42	−9	21
14	Schwarz-Weiß Bregenz	28	8	5	15	30	49	−19	21
15	WSV Donawitz	28	3	4	21	26	82	−56	10

Source: rsssf.com

== Results ==
Home \ Away	ADM	KLA	ASZ	AWI	DON	EIS	GAK	LIN	RWI	BRE	STU	WIN	WAK	WAT	WIE
Admira Wien Energie		0–3	0–2	1–4	4–2	2–2	3–0	0–2	1–1	1–0	1–0	4–1	2–2	3–0	0–2
Austria Klagenfurt	1–4		1–0	0–0	4–0	0–2	2–2	1–2	3–2	2–3	2–0	0–1	2–0	4–1	0–4
Austria Salzburg	0–0	1–1		3–3	4–2	1–1	0–1	0–2	0–2	2–1	1–2	0–0	2–0	1–1	2–1
Austria Wien	2–1	2–2	1–1		3–2	3–1	3–1	2–0	4–3	2–1	1–1	1–0	0–0	4–0	2–1
Donawitz	2–4	0–2	0–4	1–6		0–2	0–1	1–2	0–5	0–0	0–4	1–5	3–1	2–1	2–2
Eisenstadt	1–1	2–2	1–3	1–2	2–1		1–3	1–0	2–2	1–2	0–0	0–2	0–2	2–0	0–0
Grazer AK	2–2	2–0	0–6	2–5	4–1	1–0		0–0	1–4	0–4	1–1	0–4	4–1	3–1	1–1
Linzer ASK	0–1	1–1	0–2	3–2	5–0	3–2	0–0		0–1	2–1	2–1	4–2	0–1	3–2	0–0
Rapid Wien	5–1	6–0	1–1	0–2	3–2	2–1	2–1	1–1		4–1	5–2	2–0	4–0	5–0	2–2
Bregenz	0–3	0–0	1–1	3–0	1–2	0–3	0–2	1–0	1–0		0–1	1–2	4–1	1–1	0–2
Sturm Graz	1–0	0–2	2–1	1–1	1–1	1–0	3–1	3–0	2–1	0–1		0–0	1–0	3–1	0–0
Wacker Innsbruck	3–1	1–2	1–2	1–4	2–0	4–1	1–3	1–1	1–0	3–0	0–2		0–2	3–3	0–5
Wacker Wien	5–2	4–1	1–0	1–6	4–1	3–3	2–1	2–2	0–1	2–3	3–1	0–1		1–1	0–2
Wattens	2–0	1–0	1–1	1–4	0–0	1–0	1–0	0–2	2–0	4–0	2–0	1–4	1–1		2–2
Wiener SC	0–1	0–0	1–0	3–3	6–0	1–1	6–0	4–1	3–0	0–0	2–0	3–3	3–0	6–1	

Legend: Blue = home team win; Yellow = draw; Red = away team win.
