= Alfred Eisele =

Austrian footballer

Personal information
- Date of birth: 26 April 1947
- Date of death: 28 February 2014 (aged 66)
- Position: Midfielder

International career
Years	Team	Apps	(Gls)
1969	Austria	2	(0)

Alfred Eisele (26 April 1947 – 28 February 2014) was an Austrian footballer. He played in two matches for the Austria national football team in 1969.
