= 1986–87 Austrian Football Bundesliga =

69th season of top-tier football league in Austria

Austrian Bundesliga
- Season: 1986–87
- Champions: SK Rapid Wien

Statistics of Austrian Football Bundesliga in the 1986–87 season.

== Overview ==
Fall season was contested by 12 teams, and higher eight teams go into Meister playoff. Lower four teams fought in Mittlere Playoff with higher four teams of Austrian Football First League.

SK Rapid Wien won the championship.

=== Teams and location ===
Location of teams in the 1986–87 Austrian Football Bundesliga

Teams of 1986–87 Austrian Football Bundesliga

- FC Admira/Wacker
- Austria Wien
- Eisenstadt
- First Vienna
- Grazer AK
- Kärnten
- LASK
- Rapid Wien
- Swarovski Tirol
- Sturm Graz
- VÖEST Linz
- Wiener Sport-Club

== Autumn season ==
=== Table ===
Pos	Team	Pld	W	D	L	GF	GA	GD	Pts	
1	Austria Wien	22	14	5	3	57	28	+29	33	Qualification to Championship playoffs
2	Rapid Wien	22	12	6	4	65	31	+34	30	Qualification to Championship playoffs
3	Swarovski Tirol	22	13	4	5	50	31	+19	30	Qualification to Championship playoffs
4	Admira/Wacker	22	9	4	9	42	34	+8	22	Qualification to Championship playoffs
5	VOEST Linz	22	9	4	9	35	37	−2	22	Qualification to Championship playoffs
6	Linzer ASK	22	9	4	9	31	39	−8	22	Qualification to Championship playoffs
7	Wiener SC	22	9	3	10	48	40	+8	21	Qualification to Championship playoffs
8	Sturm Graz	22	8	5	9	28	32	−4	21	Qualification to Championship playoffs
9	First Vienna	22	9	2	11	27	40	−13	20	Qualification to Promotion/relegation playoffs
10	Eisenstadt	22	7	5	10	32	46	−14	19	Qualification to Promotion/relegation playoffs
11	Grazer AK	22	6	4	12	26	41	−15	16	Qualification to Promotion/relegation playoffs
12	Austria Klagenfurt	22	1	6	15	14	56	−42	8	Qualification to Promotion/relegation playoffs

Source: bundesliga.at

=== Results ===
Home \ Away	ADM	KLA	AWI	EIS	FIR	GAK	LIN	RWI	STU	SWA	VOE	WIE
Admira/Wacker		4–1	1–3	5–1	1–0	5–0	4–1	0–3	5–2	2–0	2–2	3–0
Austria Klagenfurt	1–2		1–1	0–0	1–2	1–3	0–1	1–0	0–0	1–1	0–0	2–2
Austria Wien	2–0	4–1		6–3	1–0	1–1	5–1	1–1	2–0	1–2	3–0	4–1
Eisenstadt	2–0	2–0	1–5		2–0	2–1	1–1	0–0	0–0	3–5	2–1	2–0
First Vienna	1–0	3–1	4–2	1–4		1–0	0–2	1–1	1–0	3–1	3–1	3–1
Grazer AK	0–0	5–1	2–0	4–2	0–0		1–4	0–4	2–3	0–2	2–0	2–1
Linzer ASK	1–1	3–0	1–2	3–1	2–1	1–1		1–1	2–1	1–0	2–3	0–2
Rapid Wien	4–4	8–1	2–2	4–2	4–1	2–0	7–1		3–1	2–1	4–1	2–3
Sturm Graz	2–0	2–0	0–2	0–0	3–0	1–0	1–0	3–5		2–2	2–0	2–2
Swarovski Tirol	4–1	4–1	2–4	2–1	5–0	1–0	4–2	3–1	4–1		1–0	3–2
VOEST Linz	2–1	3–0	1–1	3–1	4–1	4–2	0–1	4–3	1–0	2–2		2–4
Wiener SC	2–1	6–0	3–5	5–0	4–1	5–0	3–0	0–4	1–2	1–1	0–1	

Legend: Blue = home team win; Yellow = draw; Red = away team win.

== Spring season ==
=== Championship playoffs ===
==== Table ====
Pos	Team	Pld	W	D	L	GF	GA	GD	Pts	Qualification or relegation
1	Rapid Wien	36	22	8	6	94	43	+51	52	Qualification to European Cup first round
2	Austria Wien	36	21	10	5	86	40	+46	52	Qualification to UEFA Cup first round
3	Swarovski Tirol	36	20	5	11	78	57	+21	45	Qualification to Cup Winners' Cup first round
4	Linzer ASK	36	17	6	13	56	59	−3	40	Qualification to UEFA Cup first round
5	Admira/Wacker	36	13	7	16	63	55	+8	33	
6	Wiener SC	36	13	6	17	74	64	+10	32	
7	Sturm Graz	36	11	8	17	45	67	−22	30	
8	VOEST Linz	36	11	7	18	46	73	−27	29	

Source: bundesliga.at
Rules for classification: 1) points; 2) goal difference; 3) number of goals scored.

==== Results ====
Home \ Away	ADM	AWI	LIN	RWI	STU	SWA	VOE	WIE
Admira/Wacker		1–1	1–2	1–2	0–1	2–2	0–1	4–1
Austria Wien	1–1		1–1	3–1	1–1	5–1	0–1	2–1
Linzer ASK	2–1	1–1		2–0	3–1	3–0	1–0	3–2
Rapid Wien	2–1	1–3	0–2		3–1	4–0	2–0	1–1
Sturm Graz	1–0	1–1	1–3	1–3		3–1	1–7	1–0
Swarovski Tirol	2–2	1–5	0–3	0–4	1–3		0–1	2–2
VOEST Linz	1–0	1–0	0–1	0–2	7–1	1–0		2–4
Wiener SC	1–4	1–2	2–3	1–1	0–1	2–2	4–2	

Legend: Blue = home team win; Yellow = draw; Red = away team win.

=== Promotion/relegation playoffs ===
==== Table ====
Pos	Team	Pld	W	D	L	GF	GA	GD	Pts
1	VfB Mödling (Note: Belongs to Austrian Football First League)	14	6	6	2	19	9	+10	18
2	First Vienna	14	6	5	3	29	18	+11	17
3	Grazer AK	14	7	3	4	16	12	+4	17
4	Austria Klagenfurt	14	6	4	4	12	17	−5	16
5	Vorwärts Steyr	14	4	6	4	16	15	+1	14
6	Austria Salzburg	14	4	4	6	11	19	−8	12
7	Eisenstadt	14	3	4	7	14	22	−8	10
8	Donawitzer SV Alpine	14	2	4	8	11	16	−5	8

Source: rsssf.com

==== Results ====
Home \ Away	KLA	ASZ	DON	EIS	FIR	GAK	MÖD	VOR
Austria Klagenfurt		1–0	2–1	0–1	1–1	2–1	0–0	2–0
Austria Salzburg	1–1		0–0	3–1	0–4	0–2	0–0	0–4
Donawitzer SV Alpine	0–1	1–2		0–0	0–2	0–1	0–2	1–1
Eisenstadt	0–1	2–0	1–6		2–3	1–1	1–0	2–2
First Vienna	5–0	1–0	1–1	2–2		2–2	5–4	1–2
Grazer AK	4–0	0–1	2–0	1–0	1–0		2–0	1–0
VfB Mödling	2–0	3–1	0–2	1–0	2–2	4–0		0–0
Vorwärts Steyr	1–1	1–1	1–0	2–1	1–0	0–0	1–1	

Legend: Blue = home team win; Yellow = draw; Red = away team win.
