= 1980–81 Austrian Football Bundesliga =

63rd season of top-tier football league in Austria

Austrian Bundesliga
- Season: 1980–81
- Champions: FK Austria Wien

Statistics of Austrian Football Bundesliga in the 1980–81 season.

== Overview ==
It was contested by 10 teams, and FK Austria Wien won the championship.

=== Teams and Location ===
Location of teams in the 1980–81 Austrian Football Bundesliga

Teams of 1980–81 Austrian Football Bundesliga

- FC Admira/Wacker
- Austria Salzburg
- Austria Wien
- Grazer AK
- LASK
- Rapid Wien
- SC Eisenstadt
- Sturm Graz
- VÖEST Linz
- Wiener Sport-Club

== League standings ==
Pos	Team	Pld	W	D	L	GF	GA	GD	Pts
1	FK Austria Wien	36	20	6	10	77	46	+31	46
2	SK Sturm Graz	36	17	11	8	58	39	+19	45
3	SK Rapid Wien	36	18	7	11	69	43	+26	43
4	FC Admira/Wacker	36	17	8	11	56	52	+4	42
5	Grazer AK	36	13	12	11	52	49	+3	38
6	VÖEST Linz	36	12	12	12	44	40	+4	36
7	Linzer ASK	36	11	12	13	42	51	−9	34
8	Wiener Sportclub	36	12	8	16	46	49	−3	32
9	SV Austria Salzburg	36	10	3	23	40	61	−21	23
10	SC Eisenstadt	36	6	9	21	25	59	−34	21

Source: rsssf.com

== Results ==
Teams played each other four times in the league. In the first half of the season each team played every other team twice (home and away), and then did the same in the second half of the season.

=== First half of season ===
Home \ Away	ADM	ASZ	AWI	EIS	GAK	LIN	RWI	STU	VOE	WIE
Admira/Wacker		3–2	3–0 (Note: Match awarded.)	1–0	2–1	2–2	0–2	0–2	3–5	3–2
Austria Salzburg	2–3		0–2	4–1	1–2	1–0	1–4	0–2	0–0	3–1
Austria Wien	2–0	1–4		2–0	3–2	1–1	3–1	1–2	1–0	2–0
Eisenstadt	1–3	2–1	0–2		0–2	2–0	0–2	0–0	1–1	2–2
Grazer AK	3–1	2–0	1–1	0–0		3–1	3–1	2–1	0–0	1–1
Linzer ASK	1–1	0–0	2–1	3–1	0–0		3–1	2–4	2–0	2–0
Rapid Wien	0–0	2–1	2–5	4–0	0–2	0–1		4–1	4–2	0–1
Sturm Graz	1–1	1–0	1–1	1–0	2–1	2–0	3–1		4–1	0–1
VOEST Linz	0–1	3–0	1–0	3–0	0–0	4–1	1–1	0–1		1–1
Wiener SC	1–1	2–0	1–5	2–0	1–1	1–1	1–0	2–1	2–1	

Legend: Blue = home team win; Yellow = draw; Red = away team win.

=== Second half of season ===
Home \ Away	ADM	ASZ	AWI	EIS	GAK	LIN	RWI	STU	VOE	WIE
Admira/Wacker		1–0	0–2	3–2	3–5	3–2	2–1	0–2	2–2	3–2
Austria Salzburg	1–2		0–2	2–0	0–0	3–1	2–3	1–4	1–0	4–1
Austria Wien	3–2	2–0		4–0	1–0	2–0	2–0	3–1	1–1	1–4
Eisenstadt	0–2	1–0	0–0		1–1	2–2	1–3	0–2	2–0	2–1
Grazer AK	0–0	0–0	2–1	3–1		1–1	3–1	3–1	3–1	2–0
Linzer ASK	0–0	3–1	2–4	0–0	2–0		1–1	3–1	2–0	0–0
Rapid Wien	0–2	4–0	4–1	3–1	4–2	0–1		0–0	0–1	2–1
Sturm Graz	2–1	1–0	3–1	1–1	4–1	0–1	1–1		2–0	1–0
VOEST Linz	0–0	3–0	0–1	1–0	4–1	1–1	0–1	1–1		3–0
Wiener SC	1–1	2–0	2–1	4–1	2–1	2–0	1–1	1–0	1–1	

Legend: Blue = home team win; Yellow = draw; Red = away team win.
