= Austrian Football Bundesliga =

National league club competition in Austrian football

- Organising body: Österreichische Fußball Bundesliga
- Founded: 1974; 52 years ago
- Country: Austria
- Confederation: UEFA
- Chairman: Philip Thonhauser
- Chief executive officer: Christian Ebenbauer
- Number of clubs: 12 (since 2018–19)
- Level on pyramid: 1
- Relegation to: 2. Liga
- Domestic cup: Austrian Cup
- International cup(s): UEFA Champions League; UEFA Europa League; UEFA Conference League
- Current champions: LASK (2nd title) (2025–26)
- Most championships: Rapid Wien (32 titles)
- Most appearances: Heribert Weber (581)
- Top scorer: Hans Krankl (270)
- Broadcasters: Domestic; ORF; Sky Sport Austria; International; OneFootball (Selected international markets)
- Website: www.bundesliga.at
- Current: 2026–27 Austrian Bundesliga

The Bundesliga (German pronunciation: [ˈbʊndəsˌliːɡa], lit. 'Federal League'), also known as Admiral Bundesliga for sponsorship reasons, is a professional association football league in Austria and the highest level of the Austrian football league system. The competition decides the Austrian national football champions, as well the country's entrants for the various European cups run by UEFA.

The Austrian Bundesliga, which began in the 1974–75 season, has been a separate registered association since 1 December 1991. It has been won the most by the two Viennese giants Austria Wien, who were national champions 24 times, and Rapid Wien, who won the national title 32 times. The current champions are LASK. Phillip Thonhauser is president of the Austrian Bundesliga. The Austrian Football Bundesliga is currently known as Admiral Bundesliga for sponsorship reasons.

== History ==
=== 1900–1938 ===
Football has been played in Austria since around 1890. Around the turn of the twentieth century two attempts were made to start a national championship. From 1900 onwards, a cup competition was played in Vienna, the Neues Wiener Tagblatt Pokal. This cup was actually played in league format. The efforts to create a football league succeeded in 1911, with the introduction of the first Austrian football championship. The competition for this championship, the 1. Klasse (First Class), was created and organised by the Niederösterreichischer Fußball-Verband (the Lower Austrian Football Federation), and the participants played for the title of Niederösterreichische Landesmeister (Lower Austrian National Champion). From 1924, the league was considered professional and changed its name to I. Liga (First League). In 1929, an all-Austrian amateur championship was first played, won by Grazer AK. Clubs from the professional league in Vienna were not part of this competition. Teams from the other states of Austria were first allowed to join the highest division with the introduction of the Nationalliga (National League) in the season of 1937–38.

=== 1938–1945 ===
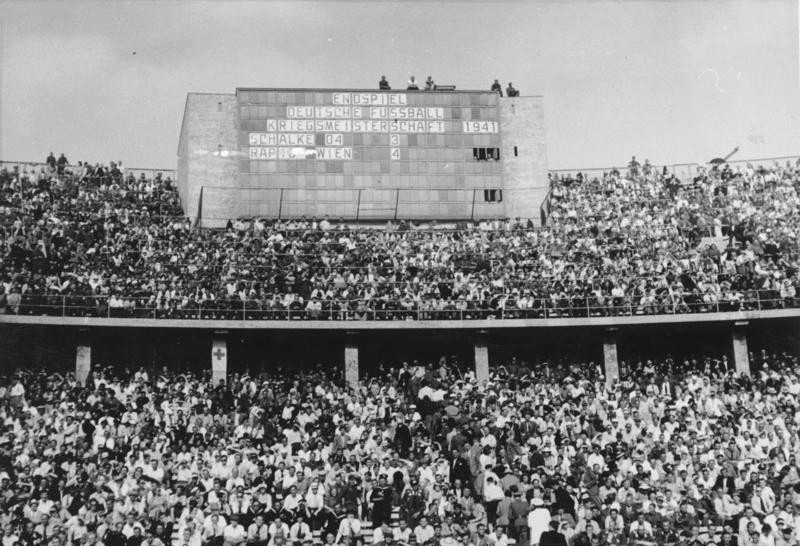
In 1941 Rapid Wien won the German championship final against Schalke 04 4–3

Austria's annexation by Germany in 1938 brought the Austrian Nationalliga to an early end. Numerous teams were disbanded and some players fled out of the country. The Austrian Nationalliga was integrated into the system of the NSRL, the Sports office of the Third Reich as the Gau XVII section under Gaufachwart Hans Janisch. Despised by Nazis as unworthy of a true German, professionalism in sports was outlawed in May 1938. "Innovations" like the Hitler salute were introduced as compulsory before and after every game. Teams, like Hakoah Wien were banned and others, like Austria Wien were first closed and then renamed. Finally, the operation of the junior teams was handed over to the local Hitlerjugend units. The new highest league in what had been Austria, the Gauliga Ostmark, was an amateur league and covered the whole of the former country except Tyrol and Vorarlberg, which were added to the Bavarian league system. The league champions now qualified for the German football championship, which Rapid Wien won in 1941. From 1941, the league was renamed Gauliga Donau-Alpenland to further eradicate the memory of Austria as an independent country. Following Nazi Germany's defeat in World War II and the disbandment of the NSRL, Austria's teams were excluded again from the German league.

=== 1945–1974 ===
The league returned to a Vienna-only format in 1945, briefly named 1. Klasse once more before changing to just Liga in 1946. Only upon the introduction of the all-Austrian Staatsliga A in 1949 did teams from the whole federal territory finally play for the Austrian Championship. However, the road to organising the Staatsliga proved difficult. A conflict between the representatives of the amateur and the professional aspects of the sport led to the separation of the Viennese league from the football federation, and to the establishment of its own competition on 30 June 1949. At the statutory Presidential Election Council of the Austrian Football Association only a few days later a surprising turn took place – upon the request of Lower Austria, the introduction of the Staatsliga was finally and unanimously confirmed. The organisation was in the hands of the Fußballstaatsliga Österreich, created for this purpose. A Staatsliga B, the second division of national league football, was formed in 1950. This league, however, was disbanded again in 1959, whereby the Staatsliga A dropped the A from its name, the need for differentiating having been gone. In 1965, however, the Austrian Football Association again took over the organisation of the top division, with the (second) introduction of the Nationalliga. On 21 April 1974, against the vote of the Vorarlberg association, the introduction of the Bundesliga was decided. The Nationalliga remained as the second division, for now.

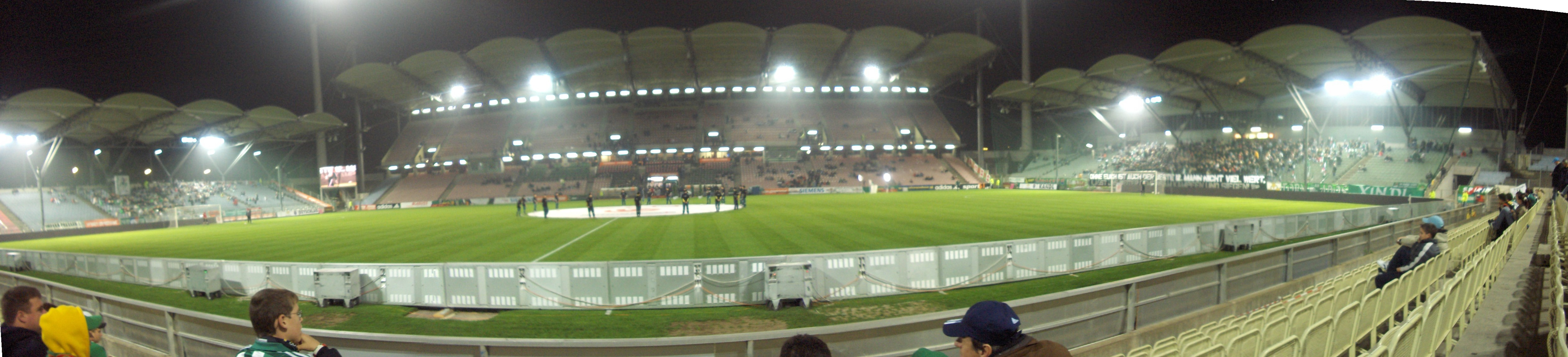
Gerhard-Hanappi-Stadion, Rapid Wien

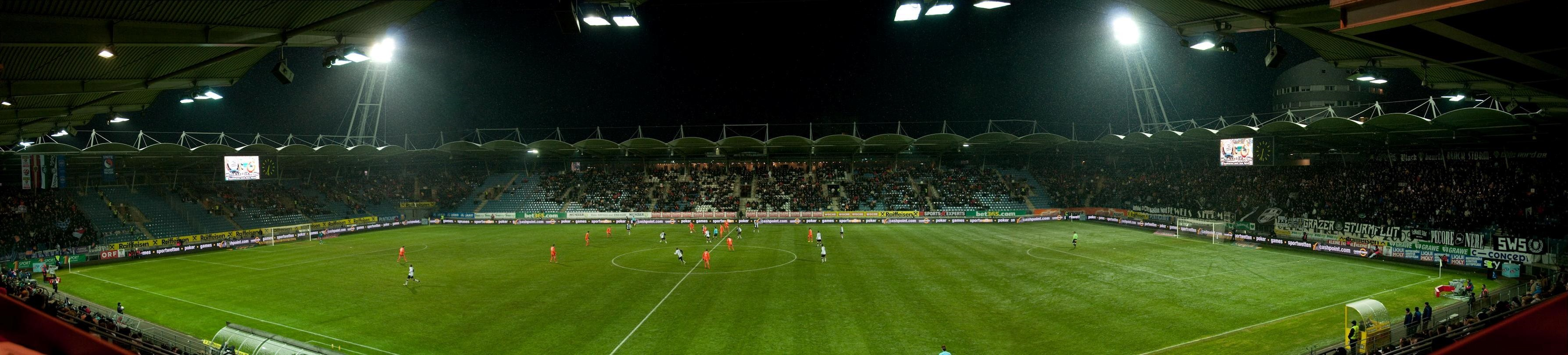
UPC-Arena, Sturm Graz

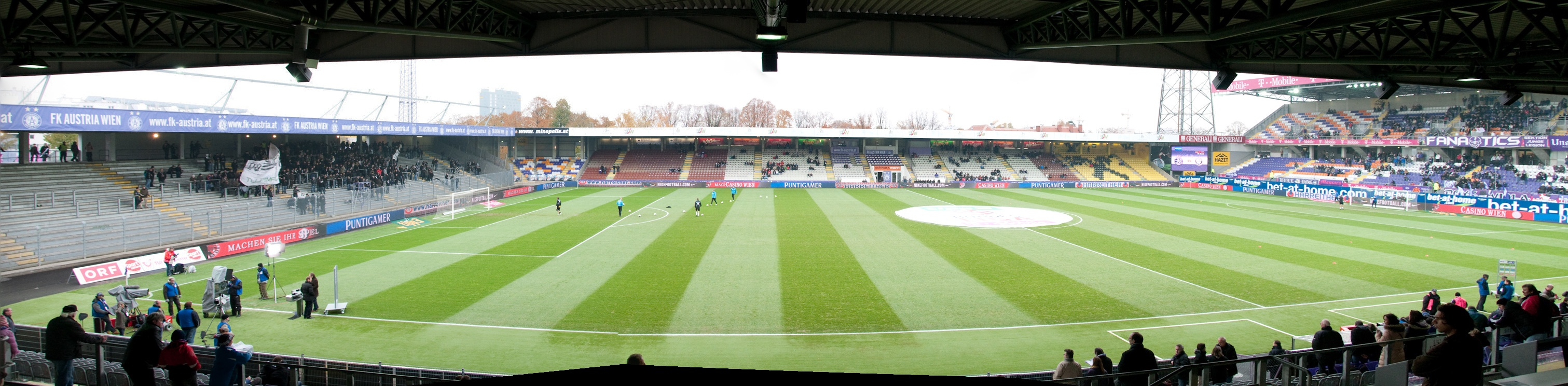
Generali Arena, Austria Wien

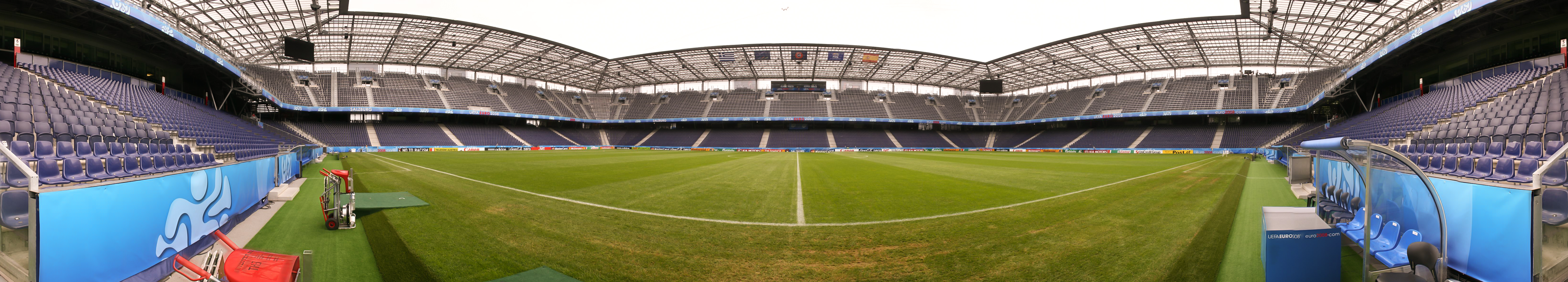
Red Bull Arena, FC Salzburg

=== 1974 to current ===
In the 1974–75 season the Bundesliga was introduced which, still led by the Austrian Football Association, aligned both of the highest divisions in Austria. In 1976, the Nationalliga was renamed to Bundesliga – Second Division while the Bundesliga was now called Bundesliga – First Division. From 1974 to 1982 the league operated with ten clubs with each club playing the other four times during the season. From 1982 to 1985 it played with sixteen clubs with each club playing the others twice. The league's modus was changed in 1985 to a twelve team league which played a home -and away round in autumn. The top eight clubs then advanced to the championship round (Officially: Oberes Play-off) who again played each other twice. The bottom four of the autumn round played the top four of the First League to determine the four teams to play in the Bundesliga in the following season. This modus was used for the next eight seasons until 1993 when the league returned to the ten team format it originally operated in. 26 years after dissolution of the independent Staatsliga on 17 November 1991, the Austrian Football Bundesliga was reconstituted as a federation and admitted on 1 December 1991 to the Austrian Football Association as its 10th member. Beginning with the 2018-19 season the league expanded from its current 10 teams to 12 teams.

=== Tasks and legal form ===
Since 1991 the Bundesliga has carried its own responsibility as a separate association, and organises the championships of the two highest divisions in Austria. Both are named after their sponsors; since 2014 the Bundesliga is named after sports-betting company, Tipico. The second division, called the "Erste Liga" or "First League," is sponsored by Sky Go. In addition the Bundesliga is responsible for the Toto Jugendliga, leagues for under 15/17/19 teams of professional clubs and academies. The Bundesliga also represents professional football in Austria, in co-operation with the football clubs themselves. The Bundesliga is legally a non-profit organisation. The twenty teams of the Tipico Bundesliga and the Sky Go Erste Liga constitute the members of the Bundesliga. The Bundesliga is represented by an acting executive committee, which supports a supervisory board. Each association of the two professional leagues is represented in presidential conferences; these have advisory function in all affairs concerning the Bundesliga.

=== Scopes of responsibility of the senates ===
The 'senates' are organising committees which consist of honorary and committee-members independent of the clubs. The first senate is responsible for suspensions and for the running of championship games. The second senate functions as an arbitration board for financial disagreements, the third senate is responsible for all financial concerns and the fourth senate is the panel of referees for the Bundesliga. The evaluation of a club's economic competency which is required in order to obtain a playing licence for the two professional leagues takes place at the fifth senate, the Bundesliga licence committee.

== Bundesliga ==
=== Format ===
In the Bundesliga, twelve teams play a double round-robin schedule, with each team playing every other once at home and away during the regular season. The league table is then separated into two parts, with the teams ranked first through sixth continuing into the Championship Round, and the remaining teams ranked seventh to twelfth competing in the Relegation Round. The points obtained during the regular season are then halved (and rounded down) before the start of the two playoffs. Each group of six teams play another double round robin schedule, with one home and one away game against each of their five opponents. At the end of the season, the team finishing top of the Championship Round is crowned champion of the Bundesliga. The team finishing in last place in the table in the Relegation Round is demoted to the Admiral 2. Liga, the champion of which is promoted in their place. Teams in the Admiral Bundesliga first division thus play 32 games in a league season between August and May.

=== Tiebreakers ===
In the event of two teams having the same number of points, tiebreakers to determine league position are as follows:

1. Head-to-Head Match Statistics (Number of points, Goal difference, goals scored) If several teams are equal on points, an internal table of all head-to-head matches will be created.
2. Higher Goal Difference
3. Higher Number of Goals Scored
4. Higher Number of Victories
5. Higher Number of Away Victories
6. Higher Number of Goals Scored in Away Games

=== Qualification for European Competitions ===
- The Bundesliga champion qualifies for the group stage of the UEFA Champions League
- The Runner-Up enters the UEFA Champions League in the 2nd Qualifying Round (League Path)
- The 3rd Place team enters the UEFA Europa League in the 2nd Qualifying Round
- The winner of the Europa Conference League Playoffs qualifies for the 2nd Qualifying Round of the UEFA Europa Conference League

The winner of the Austrian Cup competition qualifies for the Playoff Round of the UEFA Europa League. In the event that the Bundesliga champion is also the Austrian Cup winner, the fourth-placed team in the Bundesliga enters the UEFA Europa League in the 2nd Qualifying Round, and the 3rd Place team enters in the Playoff Round.

== Current clubs ==
Location of teams in the 2024–25 Austrian Football Bundesliga

Team	Location	Venue	Capacity
Austria Wien	Vienna	Generali Arena	17,656
Blau-Weiß Linz	Linz	Hofmann Personal Stadion	5,595
Grazer AK	Graz	Merkur-Arena	16,364
LASK	Linz	Raiffeisen Arena	19,080
Rapid Wien	Vienna	Allianz Stadion	28,000
Red Bull Salzburg	Wals-Siezenheim	Red Bull Arena	17,218 (30,188) (Note: upper stand remains closed during league matches)
SV Ried	Ried im Innkreis	BWT X Upper Austrian Arena	7,680
Rheindorf Altach	Altach	Stadion Schnabelholz	8,500
Sturm Graz	Graz	Merkur-Arena	16,364
TSV Hartberg	Hartberg	Profertil Arena Hartberg	4,635
Wolfsberger AC	Wolfsberg	Lavanttal-Arena	7,300
WSG Tirol	Innsbruck	Tivoli Stadion Tirol	16,008

== Seasons by club ==
This is the complete list of the clubs that have taken part in at least one Austrian Football Bundesliga season, founded in 1974, until the 2025–26 season. Teams that currently play are indicated in bold.

- 52 season: **FK Austria Wien**, **SK Rapid Wien**, **SK Sturm Graz** (2026)
- 47 season: **FC Red Bull Salzburg** (2026)
- 41 season: Admira Wacker Mödling (2022)
- 35 season: FC Wacker Innsbruck/ FC Swarovski Tirol/ FC Tirol Innsbruck/FC Wacker Innsbruck (2019)
- 35 season: **LASK** (2026)
- 29 season: **Grazer AK** (2026)
- 24 season: **SV Ried** (2026)
- 18 season: VÖEST Linz/VOEST Linz/FC Stahl Linz/FC Linz (1997)
- 15 season: Wiener Sport-Club (1994), SV Mattersburg (2020), FC Kärnten/SK Austria Klagenfurt (2025), **SC Rheindorf Altach** (2026)
- 14 season: **Wolfsberger AC** (2026)
- 12 season: First Vienna FC (1992)
- 11 season: VSE Sankt Pölten/SKN St. Pölten (2021)
- 9 season: SK Vorwärts Steyr (1999)
- 8 season: ASKÖ Pasching/SK Austria Kärnten (2010), **TSV Hartberg** (2026)
- 7 season: SC Eisenstadt (1987), **WSG Tirol** (2026)
- 6 season: Schwarz-Weiß Bregenz (2005)
- 5 season: 1. Wiener Neustadter SC (2015), SC Austria Lustenau (2024)
- 4 season: DSV Leoben (1992), VfB Mödling (1995), Kapfenberger SV (2012)
- 3 season: Kremser SC (1992), SV Grödig (2016), **FC Blau-Weiß Linz** (2026)
- 2 season: SC Neusiedl am See 1919 (1984), FC Union Wels (1984), Favoritner AC (1985)
- 1 season: 1. Simmeringer SC (1983), FC St. Veit (1984), SV Spittal (1985), Salzburger AK 1914 (1986)

== List of champions ==
Season	Champions	Runners-up	Top scorer(s) (goals)
1974–75	Wacker Innsbruck	VÖEST Linz	(Austria) Helmut Köglberger (LASK) (22)
1975–76	Austria Wien	Wacker Innsbruck	Johann Pirkner (Austria Wien) (21)
1976–77	Wacker Innsbruck	Rapid Wien	(Austria) Hans Krankl (Rapid Wien) (32)
1977–78	Austria Wien	Rapid Wien	(Austria) Hans Krankl (Rapid Wien) (41)
1978–79	Austria Wien	Wiener Sport-Club	Walter Schachner (Austria Wien) (24)
1979–80	Austria Wien	VOEST Linz	Walter Schachner (Austria Wien) (34)
1980–81	Austria Wien	Sturm Graz	(Austria) Gernot Jurtin (Sturm Graz) (22)
1981–82	Rapid Wien	Austria Wien	(Socialist Federal Republic of Yugoslavia) Božo Bakota (Sturm Graz) (24)
1982–83	Rapid Wien	Austria Wien	(Austria) Hans Krankl (Rapid Wien) (23)
1983–84	Austria Wien	Rapid Wien	(Hungary) Tibor Nyilasi (Austria Wien) (26)
1984–85	Austria Wien	Rapid Wien	Toni Polster (Austria Wien) (24)
1985–86	Austria Wien	Rapid Wien	Toni Polster (Austria Wien) (33)
1986–87	Rapid Wien	Austria Wien	Toni Polster (Austria Wien) (39)
1987–88	Rapid Wien	Austria Wien	(Socialist Federal Republic of Yugoslavia) Zoran Stojadinović (Rapid Wien) (27)
1988–89	Swarovski Tirol	Admira/Wacker Wien	(Austria) Peter Pacult (Swarovski Tirol) (26)
1989–90	Swarovski Tirol	Austria Wien	(Austria) Gerhard Rodax (Admira/Wacker) (35)
1990–91	Austria Wien	Swarovski Tirol	(Czechoslovakia) Václav Daněk (Swarovski Tirol) (29)
1991–92	Austria Wien	Austria Salzburg	(Austria) Christoph Westerthaler (Swarovski Tirol) (17)
1992–93	Austria Wien	Austria Salzburg	(Czechoslovakia) Václav Daněk (Tirol Innsbruck) (24)
1993–94	Austria Salzburg	Austria Wien	(Croatia) Nikola Jurčević (Austria Salzburg); Heimo Pfeifenberger (Austria Salzburg) (14)
1994–95	Austria Salzburg	Sturm Graz	(Senegal) Souleymane Sané (Tirol Innsbruck) (20)
1995–96	Rapid Wien	Sturm Graz	(Austria) Ivica Vastić (Sturm Graz) (20)
1996–97	Austria Salzburg	Rapid Wien	(Czech Republic) René Wagner (Rapid Wien) (28)
1997–98	Sturm Graz	Rapid Wien	(Norway) Geir Frigård (LASK) (23)
1998–99	Sturm Graz	Rapid Wien	Edi Glieder (Austria Salzburg) (22)
1999–2000	Tirol Innsbruck	Sturm Graz	(Austria) Ivica Vastić (Sturm Graz) (32)
2000–01	Tirol Innsbruck	Rapid Wien	(Poland) Radosław Gilewicz (Tirol Innsbruck) (22)
2001–02	Tirol Innsbruck	Sturm Graz	(Austria) Ronald Brunmayr (Grazer AK) (27)
2002–03	Austria Wien	Grazer AK	(Belgium) Axel Lawarée (Schwarz-Weiß Bregenz) (21)
2003–04	Grazer AK	Austria Wien	(Austria) Roland Kollmann (Grazer AK) (27)
2004–05	Rapid Wien	Grazer AK	(Austria) Christian Mayrleb (ASKÖ Pasching) (21)
2005–06	Austria Wien	Red Bull Salzburg	Sanel Kuljić (SV Ried); Roland Linz (Austria Wien)(15)
2006–07	Red Bull Salzburg	SV Ried	(Germany) Alexander Zickler (Red Bull Salzburg) (22)
2007–08	Rapid Wien	Red Bull Salzburg	(Germany) Alexander Zickler (Red Bull Salzburg) (16)
2008–09	Red Bull Salzburg	Rapid Wien	(Austria) Marc Janko (Red Bull Salzburg) (39)
2009–10	Red Bull Salzburg	Austria Wien	(Germany) Steffen Hofmann (Rapid Wien) (20)
2010–11	Sturm Graz	Red Bull Salzburg	Roland Linz (Austria Wien) (21)
2011–12	Red Bull Salzburg	Rapid Wien	(Austria) Jakob Jantscher (Red Bull Salzburg) (Austria) Stefan Maierhofer (Red Bull Salzburg) (14)
2012–13	Austria Wien	Red Bull Salzburg	Philipp Hosiner (Admira Wacker Mödling/Austria Wien) (32)
2013–14	Red Bull Salzburg	Rapid Wien	(Spain) Jonathan Soriano (Red Bull Salzburg) (31)
2014–15	Red Bull Salzburg	Rapid Wien	(Spain) Jonathan Soriano (Red Bull Salzburg) (31)
2015–16	Red Bull Salzburg	Rapid Wien	(Spain) Jonathan Soriano (Red Bull Salzburg) (21)
2016–17	Red Bull Salzburg	Austria Wien	(Nigeria) Olarenwaju Kayode (Austria Wien) (17)
2017–18	Red Bull Salzburg	Sturm Graz	(Israel) Mu'nas Dabbur (Red Bull Salzburg) (22)
2018–19	Red Bull Salzburg	LASK	(Israel) Mu'nas Dabbur (Red Bull Salzburg) (20)
2019–20	Red Bull Salzburg	Rapid Wien	(Israel) Shon Weissman (Wolfsberger AC) (30)
2020–21	Red Bull Salzburg	Rapid Wien	(Zambia) Patson Daka (Red Bull Salzburg) (27)
2021–22	Red Bull Salzburg	Sturm Graz	(Germany) Karim Adeyemi (Red Bull Salzburg) (19)
2022–23	Red Bull Salzburg	Sturm Graz	(Austria) Guido Burgstaller (Rapid Wien) (21)
2023–24	Sturm Graz	Red Bull Salzburg	(Ivory Coast) Karim Konaté (Red Bull Salzburg) (20)
2024–25	Sturm Graz	Red Bull Salzburg	(Brazil) Ronivaldo (Blau-Weiß Linz) (14)
2025–26	LASK	Sturm Graz	(Georgia (country)) Otar Kiteishvili (Sturm Graz) (15)

== Performance ==
=== Performance by club ===
Club	Winners	Runners-up	Winning Seasons
Rapid Wien	32	29	1911–12, 1912–13, 1915–16, 1916–17, 1918–19, 1919–20, 1920–21, 1922–23, 1928–29, 1929–30, 1934–35, 1937–38, 1939–40, 1940–41, 1945–46, 1947–48, 1950–51, 1951–52, 1953–54, 1955–56, 1956–57, 1959–60, 1963–64, 1966–67, 1967–68, 1981–82, 1982–83, 1986–87, 1987–88, 1995–96, 2004–05, 2007–08
Austria Wien	24	19	1923–24, 1925–26, 1948–49, 1949–50, 1952–53, 1960–61, 1961–62, 1962–63, 1968–69, 1969–70, 1975–76, 1977–78, 1978–79, 1979–80, 1980–81, 1983–84, 1984–85, 1985–86, 1990–91, 1991–92, 1992–93, 2002–03, 2005–06, 2012–13
Red Bull Salzburg ‡	17	8	1993–94, 1994–95, 1996–97, 2006–07, 2008–09, 2009–10, 2011–12, 2013–14, 2014–15, 2015–16, 2016–17, 2017–18, 2018–19, 2019–20, 2020–21, 2021–22, 2022–23
Wacker Innsbruck (5) (4); Swarovski Tirol (2) (1); Tirol Innsbruck (3) (–) †	10	5	1970–71, 1971–72, 1972–73, 1974–75, 1976–77, 1988–89, 1989–90, 1999–00, 2000–01, 2001–02
SK Admira Wien (8) (5); SC Wacker Wien (1) (7); Admira Wacker Wien (–) (1) *	9	13	1926–27, 1927–28, 1931–32, 1933–34, 1935–36, 1936–37, 1938–39, 1946–47, 1965–66
First Vienna	6	6	1930–31, 1932–33, 1941–42, 1942–43, 1943–44, 1954–55
Sturm Graz	5	9	1997–98, 1998–99, 2010–11, 2023–24, 2024–25
Wiener SC	3	7	1921–22, 1957–58, 1958–59
LASK	2	2	1964–65, 2025–26
Floridsdorfer AC	1	3	1917–18
Wiener AF	1	2	1913–14
VÖEST Linz	1	2	1973–74
Grazer AK	1	2	2003–04
Wiener AC	1	1	1914–15
Hakoah Vienna	1	1	1924–25
SpC Rudolfshügel	–	1	–
Brigittenauer AC	–	1	–
FC Wien	–	1	–
SV Ried	–	1	–

Notes:

- † All teams are defunct clubs from Innsbruck, Tirol. Wacker Innsbruck (1915–99), Swarovski Tirol (1986–92) and Tirol Innsbruck (1993–02). They are considered to be the continuation of the each other.
- ‡ The Red Bull company bought the club on 6 April 2005 and rebranded it. Prior to 2005 the team was known as SV Austria Salzburg or Casino Salzburg. They also changed the colours from white-violet to red-white. The Violet-Whites ultimately formed a new club, Austria Salzburg.
  - Admira Wacker Mödling was formed after the merger of SK Admira Wien and SC Wacker Wien in 1971, under the name of Admira Wacker Wien, the merge with VfB Mödling in 1997 and the merge with SK Schwadorf in 2008. The new team play in Mödling.

=== Performance by city ===
City	Clubs	Winners	Runners-up
Vienna	Rapid Wien (32) (29), Austria Wien (24) (19), First Vienna (6) (6), Wiener SK (3) (7), Floridsdorfer AC (1) (3), Wiener AF (1) (2), Wiener AC (1) (1), Hakoah Vienna (1) (1), SpC Rudolfshügel (–) (1), Brigittenauer AC (–) (1), FC Wien (–) (1)	69	71
Salzburg	Red Bull Salzburg (17) (8) ‡	17	8
Innsbruck	Wacker Innsbruck (5) (4), Swarovski Tirol (2) (1), Tirol Innsbruck (3) (–) †	10	5
Mödling	SK Admira Wien (8) (5), SC Wacker Wien (1) (7), Admira Wacker Wien (–) (1) *	9	13
Graz	Sturm Graz (5) (9), Grazer AK (1) (2)	6	11
Linz	LASK Linz (2) (2), VÖEST Linz (1) (2)	3	4
Ried im Innkreis	SV Ried (–) (1)	–	1

== Top scorers in Bundesliga ==
Season	Player	Goals	Club
1974–75	(Austria) Helmut Köglberger	22	LASK
1975–76	(Austria) Johann Pirkner	21	Austria Wien
1976–77	(Austria) Hans Krankl	32	Rapid Wien
1977–78	(Austria) Hans Krankl	41	Rapid Wien
1978–79	(Austria) Walter Schachner	24	Austria Wien
1979–80	(Austria) Walter Schachner	34	Austria Wien
1980–81	(Austria) Gernot Jurtin	20	Sturm Graz
1981–82	(Socialist Federal Republic of Yugoslavia) Božo Bakota	24	Sturm Graz
1982–83	(Austria) Hans Krankl	23	Rapid Wien
1983–84	(Hungary) Tibor Nyilasi	26	Austria Wien
1984–85	(Austria) Toni Polster	24	Austria Wien
1985–86	(Austria) Toni Polster	33	Austria Wien
1986–87	(Austria) Toni Polster	39	Austria Wien
1987–88	(Socialist Federal Republic of Yugoslavia) Zoran Stojadinović	27	Rapid Wien
1988–89	(Austria) Peter Pacult	26	Swarovski Tirol
1989–90	(Austria) Gerhard Rodax	35	Admira Wacker
1990–91	(Czechoslovakia) Václav Daněk	29	Swarovski Tirol
1991–92	(Austria) Christoph Westerthaler	17	Swarovski Tirol
1992–93	(Czechoslovakia) Václav Daněk	24	Tirol Innsbruck
1993–94	(Croatia) Nikola Jurčević (Austria) Heimo Pfeifenberger	14	SV Salzburg; SV Salzburg
1994–95	(Senegal) Souleyman Sané	20	Tirol Innsbruck
1995–96	(Austria) Ivica Vastić	22	Sturm Graz
1996–97	(Czech Republic) René Wagner	21	Rapid Wien
1997–98	(Norway) Geir Frigård	23	LASK
1998–99	(Austria) Eduard Glieder	22	SV Salzburg

Season	Player	Goals	Club
1999–2000	(Austria) Ivica Vastić	32	Sturm Graz
2000–01	(Poland) Radosław Gilewicz	22	Tirol Innsbruck
2001–02	(Austria) Ronald Brunmayr	27	Grazer AK
2002–03	(Belgium) Axel Lawarée	21	Schwarz-Weiß Bregenz
2003–04	(Austria) Roland Kollmann	27	Grazer AK
2004–05	(Austria) Christian Mayrleb	21	SV Pasching
2005–06	(Austria) Sanel Kuljić (Austria) Roland Linz	15	SV Ried; Austria Wien
2006–07	(Germany) Alexander Zickler	22	Red Bull Salzburg
2007–08	(Germany) Alexander Zickler	16	Red Bull Salzburg
2008–09	(Austria) Marc Janko	39	Red Bull Salzburg
2009–10	(Germany) Steffen Hofmann	20	Rapid Wien
2010–11	(Austria) Roland Linz (Austria) Roman Kienast	21	Austria Wien; Sturm Graz
2011–12	(Austria) Jakob Jantscher (Austria) Stefan Maierhofer	14	Red Bull Salzburg
2012–13	(Austria) Philipp Hosiner	32	Austria Wien
2013–14	(Spain) Jonathan Soriano	31	Red Bull Salzburg
2014–15	(Spain) Jonathan Soriano	31	Red Bull Salzburg
2015–16	(Spain) Jonathan Soriano	21	Red Bull Salzburg
2016–17	(Nigeria) Olarenwaju Kayode	17	Austria Wien
2017–18	(Israel) Mu'nas Dabbur	22	Red Bull Salzburg
2018–19	(Israel) Mu'nas Dabbur	20	Red Bull Salzburg
2019–20	(Israel) Shon Weissman	30	Wolfsberg
2020–21	(Zambia) Patson Daka	27	Red Bull Salzburg
2021–22	(Germany) Karim Adeyemi (Albania) Giacomo Vrioni	17	Red Bull Salzburg; WSG Tirol
2022–23	(Austria) Guido Burgstaller	21	Rapid Wien
2023–24	(Ivory Coast) Karim Konaté	21	Red Bull Salzburg
2024–25	(Ivory Coast) Karim Konaté	20	Red Bull Salzburg
2025–26	(Georgia (country)) Otar Kiteishvili	15	Sturm Graz

=== All-time top scorers ===
As of 31 July 2023

Rank	Name	Goals	Apps	Ratio	Years	Club(s)
1	(Austria) Hans Krankl	270	361	0.75	1970–1989	Rapid Wien, Wiener SK, First Vienna
2	(Austria) Ivica Vastić	187	441	0.42	1991–2009	Sturm Graz, Austria Wien, Admira Wacker, LASK, VSE St. Pölten, First Vienna
3	(Austria) Peter Pacult	186	396	0.47	1980–1996	Rapid Wien, Wacker Innsbruck, Austria Wien, Wiener SK, Blau-Weiß Linz
3	(Austria) Christian Mayrleb	186	494	0.38	1992–2006	Wacker Innsbruck, Austria Wien, Admira Wacker, LASK, Austria Salzburg, SV Pasching
5	(Austria) Alfred Drabits	155	365	0.42	1978–1991	Austria Wien, Wiener SK, First Vienna
6	(Austria) Mario Haas	145	451	0.32	1992–2012	Sturm Graz
7	(Austria) Christoph Westerthaler	131	378	0.35	1983–1997	Wacker Innsbruck, LASK, Vorwärts Steyr
8	(Austria) Christian Keglevits	129	405	0.32	1979–1993	Rapid Wien, LASK, Austria Salzburg, Wiener SK
9	(Austria) Walter Knaller	127	333	0.38	1980–1992	Admira Wacker, Blau-Weiß Linz
10	(Austria) Toni Polster	122	158	0.77	1982–2000	Austria Wien, FC Salzburg

== Statistics ==
=== UEFA coefficients ===
The following data indicates Austrian coefficient rankings between European football leagues.

View chart definition.

Country ranking

UEFA League Ranking as of 15 March 2019:

- 9. (11) (Scotland) Scottish Football Association (29.000)
- 10. (10) (Austria) Austrian Football Bundesliga (28.450)
- 11. (12) (Ukraine) Ukrainian Association of Football (28.400)
- 12. (9) (Belgium) Royal Belgian Football Association (24.800)
- 13. (16) Football Association of Serbia (23.875)

Club ranking

UEFA 5-year Club Ranking as of 8 July 2021:

- 22. ▲ Red Bull Salzburg (57.000)
- 54. ▲LASK (23.000)
- 93. ▼ Rapid Wien (14.500)
- 111. ▲ Wolfsberger AC (11.000)
- 138. ▲FK Austria Wien (7.500)

== See also ==
- Football in Austria
- Austrian Footballer of the Year
- Austrian Cup
- Gauliga Ostmark – the highest division in Austria from 1938 to 1945
