= 1975–76 Austrian Football Bundesliga =

58th season of top-tier football league in Austria

Austrian Bundesliga
- Season: 1975–76
- Champions: FK Austria WAC Wien

Statistics of Austrian Football Bundesliga in the 1975–76 season.

== Overview ==
It was contested by 10 teams, and Austria Wien / WAC won the championship.

=== Teams and locations ===
Location of teams in the 1975–76 Austrian Football Bundesliga

Teams of 1975–76 Austrian Football Bundesliga

- FC Admira/Wacker
- Austria Salzburg
- Austria Wien
- Grazer AK
- Kärnten
- LASK
- Rapid Wien
- Sturm Graz
- VÖEST Linz
- Wacker Innsbruck

== League standings ==
Pos	Team	Pld	W	D	L	GF	GA	GD	Pts
1	FK Austria WAC Wien	36	21	10	5	77	29	+48	52
2	FC Wacker Innsbruck	36	18	9	9	68	38	+30	45
3	SK Rapid Wien	36	17	6	13	55	50	+5	40
4	SV Austria Salzburg	36	14	11	11	47	48	−1	39
5	FC Admira/Wacker	36	13	10	13	51	54	−3	36
6	VÖEST Linz	36	13	9	14	44	44	0	35
7	Linzer ASK	36	10	11	15	46	55	−9	31
8	SK Sturm Graz	36	11	8	17	38	51	−13	30
9	Grazer AK	36	9	11	16	39	60	−21	29
10	Austria Klagenfurt	36	6	11	19	30	66	−36	23

Source: rsssf.com

== Results ==
Teams played each other four times in the league. In the first half of the season each team played every other team twice (home and away), and then did the same in the second half of the season.

=== First half of season ===
Home \ Away	ADM	KLA	ASZ	AWI	GAK	LIN	RWI	STU	VOE	WKR
Admira/Wacker		5–1	0–1	0–3	3–2	3–1	0–1	2–1	4–0	1–3
Austria Klagenfurt	1–1		0–3	2–1	2–0	1–0	1–0	0–2	1–1	1–2
Austria Salzburg	0–3 (Note: Match awarded.)	1–1		1–1	0–0	1–1	3–1	2–0	0–0	2–2
Austria WAC Wien	0–0	4–0	5–0		4–0	5–0	1–1	0–0	3–1	3–0
Grazer AK	0–0	0–0	4–2	0–2		1–0	1–0	4–4	2–1	0–0
Linzer ASK	3–0	1–1	0–2	1–1	3–0		0–1	2–2	1–4	1–1
Rapid Wien	2–3	3–0	2–1	1–1	4–3	4–0		1–0	2–0	1–0
Sturm Graz	1–1	1–0	3–0	1–2	0–0	1–0	0–0		1–2	2–1
VÖEST Linz	2–0	1–1	2–2	1–1	3–0	1–1	0–0	2–1		0–0
Wacker Innsbruck	4–2	3–1	5–2	2–1	6–0	1–1	1–0	3–0	2–1	

Legend: Blue = home team win; Yellow = draw; Red = away team win.

=== Second half of season ===
Home \ Away	ADM	KLA	ASZ	AWI	GAK	LIN	RWI	STU	VOE	WKR
Admira/Wacker		1–0	4–3	2–1	1–1	2–2	0–0	2–0	2–1	0–1
Austria Klagenfurt	2–2		0–4	0–0	4–2	0–0	4–3	1–1	0–0	0–1
Austria Salzburg	1–1	3–1		0–0	1–0	2–0	0–1	1–0	2–0	1–1
Austria WAC Wien	5–1	2–0	3–0		5–0	1–0	4–1	3–1	3–2	2–1
Grazer AK	2–0	3–0	2–2	1–2		0–0	4–0	0–1	1–0	1–0
Linzer ASK	1–1	2–0	0–1	4–2	1–0		2–3	4–1	2–0	2–0
Rapid Wien	2–0	4–1	0–1	4–1	4–3	4–3		2–0	0–2	0–4
Sturm Graz	1–3	3–0	1–0	0–1	1–1	2–4	2–0		2–0	0–3
VÖEST Linz	3–0	3–2	3–0	0–3	3–0	0–2	2–1	0–1		1–0
Wacker Innsbruck	2–1	3–1	1–2	1–1	1–1	6–1	2–2	4–1	1–2	

Legend: Blue = home team win; Yellow = draw; Red = away team win.
