= 1976–77 Austrian Football Bundesliga =

59th season of top-tier football league in Austria

Austrian Bundesliga
- Season: 1976–77
- Champions: FC Wacker Innsbruck
- Relegated: SV Austria Salzburg
- European Cup: FC Wacker Innsbruck
- Cup Winners' Cup: FK Austria Wien
- UEFA Cup: SK Rapid Wien; LASK Linz
- Matches: 180
- Goals: 473 (2.63 per match)
- Top goalscorer: Hans Krankl (32)

Statistics of Austrian Football Bundesliga in the 1976–77 season.

== Overview ==
It was contested by 10 teams, and FC Wacker Innsbruck won the championship.

=== Teams and locations ===
Location of teams in the 1976–77 Austrian Football Bundesliga

Teams of 1976–77 Austrian Football Bundesliga

- FC Admira/Wacker
- Austria Salzburg
- Austria Wien
- First Vienna
- Grazer AK
- LASK
- Rapid Wien
- Sturm Graz
- VÖEST Linz
- Wacker Innsbruck

== League standings ==
Pos	Team	Pld	W	D	L	GF	GA	GD	Pts
1	FC Wacker Innsbruck	36	21	11	4	51	22	+29	53
2	SK Rapid Wien	36	18	11	7	72	39	+33	47
3	FK Austria WAC Wien	36	19	7	10	72	44	+28	45
4	Linzer ASK	36	12	11	13	47	48	−1	35
5	VÖEST Linz	36	10	14	12	46	47	−1	34
6	FC Admira/Wacker	36	11	12	13	43	52	−9	34
7	First Vienna FC	36	9	13	14	34	40	−6	31
8	Grazer AK	36	9	12	15	34	62	−28	30
9	SK Sturm Graz	36	9	10	17	40	55	−15	28
10	SV Austria Salzburg	36	9	5	22	34	64	−30	23

Source: rsssf.com

== Results ==
Teams played each other four times in the league. In the first half of the season each team played every other team twice (home and away), and then did the same in the second half of the season.

=== First half of season ===
Home \ Away	ADM	ASZ	AWI	FIR	GAK	LIN	RWI	STU	VOE	WKR
Admira/Wacker		2–0	4–6	2–0	0–0	1–0	0–1	3–0	1–1	2–2
Austria Salzburg	1–2		1–2	1–1	0–1	0–5	4–2	4–1	1–0	2–0
Austria Wien	1–1	2–0		0–2	4–0	3–1	3–2	2–0	1–1	1–1
First Vienna	2–2	1–0	2–1		0–1	0–0	0–3	0–0	1–2	0–1
Grazer AK	0–1	3–1	3–2	1–1		3–0	0–1	0–3	0–0	1–1
Linzer ASK	4–1	2–0	0–1	2–1	1–1		2–2	5–0	1–0	2–2
Rapid Wien	2–0	2–1	0–1	0–0	5–3	4–2		1–1	0–0	0–1
Sturm Graz	1–1	1–0	5–2	0–0	2–1	3–1	1–2		3–1	0–4
VÖEST Linz	3–1	1–2	0–2	1–1	5–0	5–1	2–2	1–0		2–1
Wacker Innsbruck	1–0	0–0	2–0	1–0	2–1	3–0	1–1	2–1	4–0	

Legend: Blue = home team win; Yellow = draw; Red = away team win.

=== Second half of season ===
Home \ Away	ADM	ASZ	AWI	FIR	GAK	LIN	RWI	STU	VOE	WKR
Admira/Wacker		4–1	1–3	0–0	2–0	1–1	2–2	1–0	1–1	0–1
Austria Salzburg	1–2		0–3	1–0	2–1	0–1	1–2	1–1	2–1	2–0
Austria Wien	4–1	5–1		3–4	3–1	0–1	1–1	3–0	1–3	1–1
First Vienna	3–0	2–1	1–2		0–1	4–2	0–1	2–1	3–1	1–1
Grazer AK	0–0	3–0	0–5	1–1		1–1	1–0	0–0	1–1	1–1
Linzer ASK	0–0	2–0	1–1	2–0	1–0		2–1	0–0	1–1	0–1
Rapid Wien	3–1	5–0	1–0	1–1	11–1	3–0		3–0	5–4	1–1
Sturm Graz	6–2	2–2	0–2	2–0	0–1	2–2	0–0		3–1	0–1
VÖEST Linz	1–0	1–1	1–1	0–0	1–1	2–1	1–2	1–0		0–2
Wacker Innsbruck	0–1	1–0	1–0	2–0	4–1	1–0	1–0	3–1	0–0	

Legend: Blue = home team win; Yellow = draw; Red = away team win.
