= 1981–82 Austrian Football Bundesliga =

64th season of top-tier football league in Austria

Austrian Bundesliga
- Season: 1981–82
- Champions: SK Rapid Wien

Statistics of Austrian Football Bundesliga in the 1981–82 season.

== Overview ==
It was contested by 10 teams, and SK Rapid Wien won the championship.

=== Teams and location ===
Location of teams in the 1981–82 Austrian Football Bundesliga

Teams of 1981–82 Austrian Football Bundesliga

- FC Admira/Wacker
- Austria Salzburg
- Austria Wien
- Grazer AK
- LASK
- Rapid Wien
- Sturm Graz
- VÖEST Linz
- Wacker Innsbruck
- Wiener Sport-Club

== League standings ==
Pos	Team	Pld	W	D	L	GF	GA	GD	Pts
1	SK Rapid Wien	36	18	11	7	69	43	+26	47
2	FK Austria Wien	36	18	8	10	54	32	+22	44
3	Grazer AK	36	16	6	14	40	47	−7	38
4	FC Admira/Wacker	36	14	8	14	52	59	−7	36
5	FC Wacker Innsbruck	36	14	7	15	60	52	+8	35
6	SK Sturm Graz	36	14	5	17	53	62	−9	33
7	Wiener Sportclub	36	12	9	15	49	61	−12	33
8	VÖEST Linz	36	12	8	16	38	41	−3	32
9	SV Austria Salzburg	36	11	9	16	48	55	−7	31
10	Linzer ASK	36	12	7	17	36	47	−11	31

Source: rsssf.com

== Results ==
Teams played each other four times in the league. In the first half of the season each team played every other team twice (home and away), and then did the same in the second half of the season.

=== First half of season ===
Home \ Away	ADM	ASZ	AWI	GAK	LIN	RWI	STU	VOE	WKR	WIE
Admira/Wacker		4–2	2–2	2–1	2–0	2–3	3–1	1–0	2–4	4–3
Austria Salzburg	0–1		2–0	2–0	1–1	1–1	2–2	0–0	2–0	4–1
Austria Wien	2–0	4–1		1–1	2–0	0–1	2–1	3–0	3–0	0–1
Grazer AK	1–1	2–0	0–0		2–0	0–3	0–2	0–0	3–1	2–0
Linzer ASK	3–1	0–0	1–4	2–1		2–0	3–0	1–0	0–0	3–1
Rapid Wien	2–0	3–1	1–1	2–1	3–1		2–2	1–1	2–0	6–1
Sturm Graz	5–0	3–1	1–2	4–1	2–1	4–2		2–1	3–1	1–1
VOEST Linz	1–3	3–2	0–2	3–0	2–0	1–2	4–0		3–1	2–0
Wacker Innsbruck	0–0	2–1	0–0	2–3	3–1	0–3	5–0	1–0		5–0
Wiener SC	1–2	2–2	1–3	2–2	2–0	0–0	3–0	1–0	0–3	

Legend: Blue = home team win; Yellow = draw; Red = away team win.

=== Second half of season ===
Home \ Away	ADM	ASZ	AWI	GAK	LIN	RWI	STU	VOE	WKR	WIE
Admira/Wacker		0–0	0–1	4–1	1–0	2–2	2–0	2–2	1–0	0–0
Austria Salzburg	3–0		2–1	5–0	1–0	0–3	0–1	3–0	2–3	3–0
Austria Wien	2–1	1–0		3–0	1–1	0–3	6–1	2–0	4–1	0–5
Grazer AK	1–0	2–1	1–0		2–0	1–0	2–3	1–0	2–1	1–0
Linzer ASK	0–2	2–0	2–0	0–0		0–0	1–0	1–2	0–3	2–0
Rapid Wien	4–4	2–2	0–2	2–1	1–2		2–1	1–1	5–0	4–3
Sturm Graz	5–2	0–0	1–0	0–1	1–2	0–1		2–0	2–1	0–2
VOEST Linz	1–0	0–2	0–0	0–3	1–1	1–0	1–0		3–0	4–0
Wacker Innsbruck	2–0	9–0	1–0	0–1	3–1	3–0	2–2	1–1		1–1
Wiener SC	4–1	2–0	0–0	1–0	3–2	2–2	3–1	2–0	1–1	

Legend: Blue = home team win; Yellow = draw; Red = away team win.
