= 1960–61 Yugoslav Second League =

Yugoslav Second League
- Season: 1960–61
- Champions: Borac Banja Luka (West Division); Novi Sad (East Division)
- Promoted: Borac Banja Luka; Novi Sad
- Relegated: NK Zagreb; Triglav; Bačka; Pobeda

The 1960–61 Yugoslav Second League season was the 15th season of the Second Federal League (Serbo-Croatian: Druga savezna liga), the second level association football competition of SFR Yugoslavia, since its establishment in 1946. The league was contested in two regional groups (West Division and East Division), with 12 clubs each.

== West Division ==
=== Teams ===
A total of twelve teams contested the league, including nine sides from the 1959–60 season, one club relegated from the 1959–60 Yugoslav First League and two sides promoted from the third tier leagues played in the 1959–60 season. The league was contested in a double round robin format, with each club playing every other club twice, for a total of 22 rounds. Two points were awarded for wins and one point for draws.

Sloboda were relegated from the 1959–60 Yugoslav First League after finishing in the 12th place of the league table. The two clubs promoted to the second level were Čelik and Karlovac.

Locations of teams' home cities in the 1960–61 Yugoslav Second League West

| Team | Location | Federal subject | Position in 1959–60 |
|---|---|---|---|
| Borac Banja Luka | Banja Luka | SR Bosnia and Herzegovina | 3rd |
| Čelik | Zenica | SR Bosnia and Herzegovina | —N/a |
| Karlovac | Karlovac | SR Croatia | —N/a |
| Lokomotiva | Zagreb | SR Croatia | 8th |
| Proleter Osijek | Osijek | SR Croatia | 6th |
| Sloboda | Tuzla | SR Bosnia and Herzegovina | —N/a |
| Šibenik | Šibenik | SR Croatia | 5th |
| Trešnjevka | Zagreb | SR Croatia | 2nd |
| Odred / Triglav Ljubljana^{1} | Ljubljana | SR Slovenia | 10th |
| Varteks | Varaždin | SR Croatia | 7th |
| NK Zagreb | Zagreb | SR Croatia | 9th |
| Željezničar Sarajevo | Sarajevo | SR Bosnia and Herzegovina | 4th |

^{1 Odred renamed to Triglav on 22 December 1960.}

=== League table ===
| Pos | Team | Pld | W | D | L | GF | GA | GD | Pts | Promotion or relegation |
|---|---|---|---|---|---|---|---|---|---|---|
| 1 | Borac Banja Luka (C, P) | 22 | 14 | 6 | 2 | 51 | 22 | +29 | 34 | Promotion to Yugoslav First League |
| 2 | Željezničar | 22 | 14 | 4 | 4 | 44 | 21 | +23 | 32 | |
| 3 | Trešnjevka | 22 | 10 | 5 | 7 | 36 | 30 | +6 | 25 | |
| 4 | Čelik | 22 | 9 | 5 | 8 | 31 | 27 | +4 | 23 | |
| 5 | Sloboda Tuzla | 22 | 8 | 7 | 7 | 31 | 30 | +1 | 23 | |
| 6 | Varteks | 22 | 9 | 3 | 10 | 32 | 38 | −6 | 21 | |
| 7 | Lokomotiva | 22 | 8 | 4 | 10 | 38 | 40 | −2 | 20 | |
| 8 | Šibenik | 22 | 8 | 4 | 10 | 38 | 41 | −3 | 20 | |
| 9 | Proleter Osijek | 22 | 8 | 4 | 10 | 29 | 34 | −5 | 20 | |
| 10 | Karlovac | 22 | 8 | 4 | 10 | 41 | 52 | −11 | 20 | |
| 11 | NK Zagreb (R) | 22 | 7 | 3 | 12 | 43 | 54 | −11 | 17 | Relegation to Third Level |
| 12 | Triglav (R) | 22 | 1 | 7 | 14 | 22 | 47 | −25 | 9 | Relegation to Third Level |

Source: fsgzrenjanin.com
Rules for classification: 1) points; 2) goal difference; 3) number of goals scored.
(C) Champions; (P) Promoted; (R) Relegated

== East Division ==
=== Teams ===
A total of twelve teams contested the league, including nine sides from the 1959–60 season, one club relegated from the 1959–60 Yugoslav First League and two sides promoted from the third tier leagues played in the 1959–60 season. The league was contested in a double round robin format, with each club playing every other club twice, for a total of 22 rounds. Two points were awarded for wins and one point for draws.

Budućnost were relegated from the 1959–60 Yugoslav First League after finishing in the 11th place of the league table. The two clubs promoted to the second level were Bačka and Rudar.

Locations of teams' home cities in the 1960–61 Yugoslav Second League East

| Team | Location | Federal subject | Position in 1959–60 |
|---|---|---|---|
| Bačka | Bačka Palanka | (Socialist Republic of Serbia) SAP Vojvodina | —N/a |
| Budućnost | Titograd | SR Montenegro | —N/a |
| Mačva Šabac | Šabac | SR Serbia | 6th |
| Novi Sad | Novi Sad | (Socialist Republic of Serbia) SAP Vojvodina | 2nd |
| Pobeda | Prilep | SR Macedonia | 4th |
| Radnički Kragujevac | Kragujevac | SR Serbia | 10th |
| Radnički Niš | Niš | SR Serbia | 9th |
| Radnički Sombor | Sombor | (Socialist Republic of Serbia) SAP Vojvodina | 7th |
| Rudar | Kosovska Mitrovica | (Socialist Republic of Serbia) SAP Kosovo | —N/a |
| Spartak Subotica | Subotica | (Socialist Republic of Serbia) SAP Vojvodina | 5th |
| Srem | Sremska Mitrovica | (Socialist Republic of Serbia) SAP Vojvodina | 8th |
| Sutjeska | Nikšić | SR Montenegro | 3rd |

=== League table ===
| Pos | Team | Pld | W | D | L | GF | GA | GD | Pts | Promotion or relegation |
|---|---|---|---|---|---|---|---|---|---|---|
| 1 | Novi Sad (C, P) | 22 | 15 | 2 | 5 | 48 | 21 | +27 | 32 | Promotion to Yugoslav First League |
| 2 | Budućnost | 22 | 12 | 5 | 5 | 39 | 21 | +18 | 29 | |
| 3 | Radnički Sombor | 22 | 12 | 3 | 7 | 43 | 30 | +13 | 27 | |
| 4 | Srem | 22 | 9 | 5 | 8 | 37 | 35 | +2 | 23 | |
| 5 | Radnički Niš | 22 | 8 | 7 | 7 | 36 | 36 | 0 | 23 | |
| 6 | Spartak Subotica | 22 | 5 | 11 | 6 | 21 | 22 | −1 | 21 | |
| 7 | Sutjeska Nikšić | 22 | 7 | 5 | 10 | 28 | 35 | −7 | 19 | |
| 8 | Radnički Kragujevac | 22 | 8 | 3 | 11 | 30 | 39 | −9 | 19 | |
| 9 | Rudar | 22 | 7 | 5 | 10 | 27 | 43 | −16 | 19 | |
| 10 | Mačva Šabac | 22 | 6 | 6 | 10 | 21 | 32 | −11 | 18 | |
| 11 | Bačka (R) | 22 | 6 | 5 | 11 | 33 | 38 | −5 | 17 | Relegation to Third Level |
| 12 | Pobeda (R) | 22 | 7 | 3 | 12 | 28 | 39 | −11 | 17 | Relegation to Third Level |

Source: fsgzrenjanin.com
Rules for classification: 1) points; 2) goal difference; 3) number of goals scored.
(C) Champions; (P) Promoted; (R) Relegated

== See also ==
- 1960–61 Yugoslav First League
- 1960–61 Yugoslav Cup
