= SC Eisenstadt =

- Full name: SportClub Eisenstadt
- Founded: 1907 (refounded in 2018)
- Ground: Lindenstadion
- Capacity: 14,000
- Chairman: Michael Billes
- League: 1. Klasse Nord
- 2021–22: 3rd (2. Klasse Nord; promoted)

SC Eisenstadt was an Austrian association football club based in Eisenstadt. Established in 1907, it played in the Austrian Football Bundesliga. It folded in 2008. In 2018, SC Eisenstadt started again in the lowest league (2. Klasse Nord) in Burgenland.

They last played in the Bundesliga in the 1986–87 season.

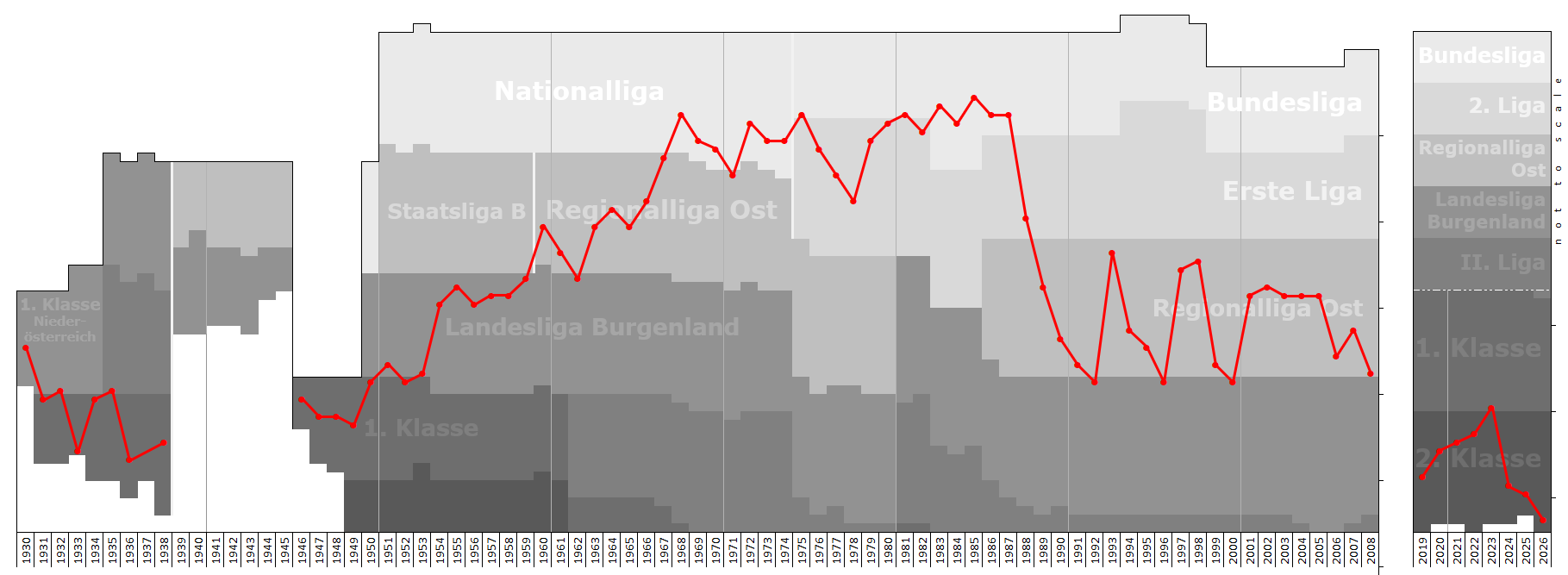
Historical chart of the club's league performance

== Honours ==
- Mitropa Cup (1): 1984
- Austrian Football First League (1): 1980
- Austrian Regional League East (2): 1967, 1971

== Past managers ==
- Alfred Günthner (1972–73)
- Horst Franz (1973–75)
- Sepp Schneider (1976–77)
- Günter Kaltenbrunner (1978–81)
- Anton Malatinský (1981–82)
- Sepp Schneider (1982–83)
- Felix Latzke (1984–85)
- Ernst Weber (1985–86)
- Alfred Eisele (1986)
- Hermann Krenn (1987)
- Alfred Eisele (1988–89)
- Hermann Stessl (1989)
- Andreas Hackstock (1990)
- Johann Schöll (1991–92)
- Johann Füzi (1992–94)
- Johann Krejcirik (1995)
- Christian Janitsch (2002–04)
- Kurt Garger (2004–05)
- Felix Latzke (2006)
- Fritz Satorina (2006)
- Ilija Sormaz (2007)
- Norbert Barisits (2007–08)
