= 1931 Mitropa Cup =

Tournament details
- Dates: 27 June – 12 November 1931
- Teams: 8

Final positions
- Champions: (Austria) First Vienna (1st title)
- Runners-up: (Austria) Wiener AC

Tournament statistics
- Matches played: 16
- Top scorer: (Austria) Heinrich Hiltl (7 goals)

The 1931 season of the Mitropa Cup football club tournament was won by First Vienna FC in an all Austrian two-legged final against Wiener Athletiksport Club. This was the fifth edition of the tournament.

The holders, SK Rapid Wien, were unable to defend the cup as two other clubs from Vienna were Austria's representatives.

The final, between the two Vienna clubs, was played on 8 and 12 November 1931 in Zurich and Vienna. First Vienna won both matches, 3–2 in Zürich and 2–1 in Vienna, to become the second Austrian club to win this event after Rapid the previous year, and the only team to win the Mitropa Cup undefeated. Henri Hiltl from Wiener Athletiksport Club was top scorer in the tournament with seven goals. Walter Hanke of Wiener AC scored a goal in each leg of the final, whilst Franz Erdl of First Vienna scored both his team's goals in the second leg.

== Quarterfinals ==
Team 1	Agg.	Team 2	1st leg	2nd leg
First Vienna (Austria)	7–0	(Hungary) Bocskai	3–0	4–0
Slavia Prague (Czechoslovakia)	2–3	(Italy) Roma	1–1	1–2
Wiener AC (Austria)	6–4	(Hungary) Hungária MTK	5–1	1–3
Juventus (Italy)	2–2^{a}	(Czechoslovakia) Sparta Prague	2–1	0–1

- ^{a} Match decided by play off.

=== Play-off ===
Team 1	Score	Team 2
Juventus (Italy)	2–3	(Czechoslovakia) Sparta Prague

== Semifinals ==
Team 1	Agg.	Team 2	1st leg	2nd leg
First Vienna (Austria)	6–3	(Italy) Roma	3–2	3–1
Sparta Prague (Czechoslovakia)	6–6^{b}	(Austria) Wiener AC	3–2	3–4

- ^{b} Match decided by play off.

=== Play-off ===
Team 1	Score	Team 2
Sparta Prague (Czechoslovakia)	0–2	(Austria) Wiener AC

== Finals ==
Team 1	Agg.	Team 2	1st leg	2nd leg
First Vienna (Austria)	5–3	(Austria) Wiener AC	3–2	2–1

=== 1st leg ===
8 November 1931

Wiener AC	2 – 3	First Vienna
Hanke 2'; Müller 22'		Tögel 30'; Adelbrecht 63'; Becher 87' (o.g.)

Hardturm (Zurich)
Attendance: 20,000
Referee: Francesco Mattea (Italy)

WIENER AC:
GK	(Austria) Rudolf Hiden
DF	(Austria) Johann Becher
DF	(Austria) Karl Sesta
MF	(Austria) Georg Braun
MF	(Austria) Ernst Löwinger
MF	(Austria) Rudolf Kubesch
FW	(Austria) Franz Cisar
FW	(Austria) Heinrich Müller
FW	(Austria) Heinrich Hiltl
FW	(Germany) Walter Hanke
FW	(Austria) Karl Huber (c)
Manager:
Karl Geyer

FIRST VIENNA FC:
GK	(Austria) Karl Horeschovsky
DF	(Austria) Karl Rainer
DF	(Austria) Josef Blum (c)
MF	(Austria) Willibald Schmaus
MF	(Austria) Leopold Hofmann
MF	(Austria) Leonhard Machu
FW	(Austria) Anton Brosenbauer
FW	(Austria) Josef Adelbrecht
FW	(Austria) Fritz Gschweidl
FW	(Austria) Gustav Tögel
FW	(Austria) Franz Erdl
Manager:
Ferdinand Frithum

=== 2nd leg ===
12 November 1931

First Vienna	2 – 1	Wiener AC
Erdl 6', 41'		Hanke 65'

Hohe Warte (Wien)
Attendance: 25,000
Referee: Rinaldo Barlassina (Italy)

FIRST VIENNA FC:
GK	(Austria) Karl Horeschovsky
DF	(Austria) Karl Rainer
DF	(Austria) Josef Blum (c)
MF	(Austria) Willibald Schmaus
MF	(Austria) Leopold Hofmann
MF	(Austria) Leonhard Machu
FW	(Austria) Anton Brosenbauer
FW	(Austria) Josef Adelbrecht
FW	(Austria) Fritz Gschweidl
FW	(Austria) Gustav Tögel
FW	(Austria) Franz Erdl
Manager:
Ferdinand Frithum

WIENER AC:
GK	(Austria) Rudolf Hiden
DF	(Austria) Johann Becher
DF	(Austria) Karl Sesta
MF	(Austria) Georg Braun
MF	(Austria) Ernst Löwinger
MF	(Austria) Rudolf Kubesch
FW	(Austria) Wilhelm Cutti
FW	(Austria) Heinrich Müller
FW	(Austria) Heinrich Hiltl
FW	(Germany) Walter Hanke
FW	(Austria) Karl Huber (c)
Manager:
Karl Geyer

1931 Mitropa Cup Champions

First Vienna
1st Title

== Top goalscorers ==
Rank	Player	Team	Goals
1	(Austria) Heinrich Hiltl	(Austria) Wiener AC	7
2	(Germany) Walter Hanke	(Austria) Wiener AC	5
3	(Austria) Franz Erdl	(Austria) First Vienna	4
3	(Czechoslovakia) Oldřich Nejedlý	(Czechoslovakia) Sparta Prague	4
