= Leopold Sax =

Austrian sportsperson (1881–1915)

Personal information
- Date of death: 2 June 1915

International career
Years	Team	Apps	(Gls)
1904	Austria	1	(0)

Leopold Sax (26 February 1881 – 12 June 1915) was an Austrian track and field athlete specializing in long-distance running, a footballer, and a coach.

== Career ==
Leopold Sax was one of the early figures in Austrian athletics. He became known primarily as a long-distance runner but also competed in the emerging sport of football, along with his contemporary rival Felix Kwieton. Sax won the prestigious Nicholson Prize in the races of 1901 and 1904.

He initially competed for Sportclub Union but moved to the Währinger Bicycle Club between 1900 and 1902. From 1903 he was a member of Wiener AC, where he also regularly played as a right midfielder in the football team. With Wiener AC he won the Challenge Cup, the competition for Austrian–Hungarian teams, in 1903 and 1904.

On 2 June 1904, he appeared with the Vienna city selection against a Budapest selection, losing 3–0 at the Millenáris Sporttelep cycling track before 800 spectators. These encounters are today recognized as international matches of the Austrian and Hungarian national teams.

When he was no longer included in Wiener AC’s first athletics squad, Sax returned to Währing in 1908 and joined the Wiener Sport-Club. There he became head of the athletics section, while also turning out for the football team. At the end of 1909 he moved to Prague for a year, joining DFC Prag. Reports suggest he played as a forward in their football side. After returning to Wiener Sport-Club, he made several more appearances up to 1911 but focused mainly on coaching athletics.

With the outbreak of the First World War, Sax was drafted in March 1915 as a member of the Landsturm militia. He was killed in action on 12 June 1915 on the “northern front.” He left behind a widow and four children.

As early as 1916, a commemorative race was held in his honor at an athletics meeting organized by the Vienna Association Football Club. Further annual races in his memory were held until 1926.

=== Clubs ===
- –1900: Sportclub Union
- 1900–1902: Währinger Bicycle Club
- 1900–1908: Wiener AC
- 1908–1909: Wiener Sport-Club
- 1909–1910: DFC Prag
- 1910–1915: Wiener Sport-Club

== Honours ==
- Challenge Cup: 1903, 1904
