= List of oldest football competitions =

This is a list of the oldest documented football competitions, played at school, club, national and international levels. The first list contains competitions that have been played continuously. The second is a list of competitions that are now defunct.

== Current competitions ==
=== Association football ===
Year	Competition	Type	First Trophy, Years	Original code	Location	Notes & references
1871	FA Cup	club trophy	FA Cup; Original FA Cup trophy 1871–1895; Second FA Cup trophy 1895–1910; Current FA cup Trophy 1911–	Association football	England	The Oldest association football competition in the world.
1873	Scottish Cup	club trophy	Scottish Cup 1874–	Association football	Scotland	Oldest association football trophy in the world.
1876	Birmingham Senior Cup	county cup	1876–	Association Football	West Midlands, England	Oldest regional trophy in the world.
1876	Sheffield & Hallamshire Senior Cup	county cup	1876–	Association Football	South Yorkshire, England	Also includes some clubs from Derbyshire, Nottinghamshire and West Yorkshire.
1877	Welsh Cup	club trophy	Welsh Cup, 1877–	Association football	Wales	
1877	Shropshire Senior Cup	county cup	Shropshire Premier County Cup, 1877-	Association football	Shropshire, England	
1878	Berks & Bucks Senior Cup	county cup	1879–	Association Football	Berkshire and Buckinghamshire, England	
1880	Lancashire Senior Cup	county cup	1880–	Association Football	Lancashire, England	Also includes teams from Greater Manchester and Merseyside
1880	Cheshire Senior Cup	county cup	1880–	Association football	Cheshire, England	Also includes teams from Greater Manchester and Merseyside, many from the historical boundaries of Cheshire.
1881	Irish Cup	club trophy	1881–	Association football	Ireland (1881–1921); Northern Ireland (1921–)	Originally created as the national club trophy for all of Ireland, it now serves as the national club trophy for Northern Ireland after the Republic of Ireland was created in 1921.
1882	Oxford University Cuppers	intercollegiate trophy		Association football	Oxford, England	University claims is its the 2nd oldest [association] football competition (after the FA Cup), but also documents 1882/83 as the first season.
1882	Cambridge University Cuppers	intercollegiate trophy		Association football	Cambridge, England	
1883	Stirlingshire Cup	Regional Cup	1883/84-	Association Football	Stirlingshire, Scotland	
1884	Lincolnshire FA County Senior Trophy	county cup	1884–	Association Football	Lincolnshire, England	
1886	Scottish Junior Cup	club trophy (non-league)	Scottish Junior Cup 1886–	Association football	Scotland	
1887	Aberdeenshire Cup	regional cup	1888	Association football	Aberdeenshire, Scotland	Claims to be second oldest association football tournament in the world.
1888	Medaille Fodbold Konkurrence	regional cup	April 29th, 1888	Pre-association	Denmark	Oldest football league outside of Great Britain and Ireland.
1888	English Football League	club league		Association football	England	Oldest association football league. The Premier League was later created and is now the top-flight English league.
1888	Durand Cup	club trophy	Durand Cup, 1888–	Association football	India	Oldest football tournament in Asia.
1889	Northern Football League	club league		Association football	North East England	Second-oldest association football league in the world.
1889	Trades Cup	regional cup		Association football	Kolkata, India	
1890	Border Cup	regional cup		Association football	Scottish Borders; Scotland	Originally played for by senior clubs, has been contested by Border Amateur Football Association clubs since 1960.
1891	Argentine Primera División	club league	Copa Campeonato (1896)	Association football	Argentina	Oldest top division association football league in the world and oldest league outside Great Britain.
1892	Brown Shield	interprovincial tournament	Brown Shield, 1892	Association football	New Zealand	Originally the country's premier football trophy, now only contested sporadically.
1892	Singapore FA Cup	national cup competition	SFA Cup, 1892	Association football	Singapore	Originally the country's premier cup competition, now only contested by clubs at levels 2 to 4 of the Singapore football league system.
1893	IFA Shield	club trophy	IFA Shield	Association football	Kolkata, India	
1894	Bedfordshire Senior Cup	county cup	1894–	Association Football	Bedfordshire, England	
1895	Belgian First Division A	club league	National Championships 1895–	Association football	Belgium	Oldest association football league in continental Europe.
1896	Hong Kong Shield	club trophy		Association football	Hong Kong	
1897	Montagu Cup	regional cup (amateur)	1897–	Association football	Mexborough, England	Oldest football cup regularly played at its original venue.
1898	Serie A	club league	National Championships 1898–	Association football	Italy	
1898	Calcutta Football League	club league		Association football	Kolkata, India	Oldest association football league in Asia.
1898	Swiss Super League	club league	1898–1929 Serie A 1931–1944 Nationalliga/Ligue Nationale/Lega Nazionale; 1944–2003 Nationalliga A/Ligue Nationale A/Lega Nazionale A 2003– Super League	Association football	Switzerland	Longest continuously running top-flight national league
1899	KNVB Cup	club trophy	1899–	Association football	Netherlands	
1900	Uruguayan Primera División	club league	1900–	Association football	Uruguay	
1901	Ontario Cup	club trophy	1901–	Association football	Canada	Oldest association football competition in North America.
1901	Nemzeti Bajnokság	club league		Association football	Hungary	
1902	Hampshire Colleges Sixes	6-a-side tournament	1902-	Association football	England	Probably the oldest small-sided football tournament/competition in the world with King Edwards School first winning in 1902.
1902	Norwegian Football Cup	club trophy		Association football	Norway	First played as an invitational tournament consisting of 5 teams and arranged by Kristiania Idrætsforening. First time as a national tournament 1963
1902 (3 May)	Campeonato Paulista	club league		Association football	São Paulo state, Brazil	
1902	Mumbai Football League	club league		Association football	Mumbai, India	
1903	Primera División de la Asociación de Football de Santiago	club league		Association football	Santiago, Chile	
1903	Copa del Rey	club trophy		Association football	Spain	
1905 (9 April)	Campeonato Baiano	club league		Association football	Bahia, Brazil	
1906 (3 May)	Campeonato Carioca	club league		Association football	Rio de Janeiro, Brazil	
1906 (8 July)	Paraguayan Primera División	club league		Association football	Paraguay	
1907	Federation Cup	club trophy		Association football	South Australia, Australia	Second oldest knockout competition in Australia.
1908	Milne Cup	annual challenge match	1908–	Association football	Shetland and Orkney (Scotland)	Oldest football competition between two islands.
1908	Hong Kong First Division League	club league		Association football	Hong Kong	
1908	Nadkarni Cup	regional cup	Nadkarni Cup	Association football	Mumbai, India	
1908 (19 October)	Football at the Summer Olympics	International tournament	1908–	Association football	various	Oldest nations association football competition in the world.
1909 (6 December)	Liga I	club league		Association football	Romania	
1911	Belgian Cup	club trophy	1911–	Association football	Belgium	
1912	Peruvian Primera División	club league		Association football	Peru	League (under the denomination of Escudo Dewar) was exclusively played by teams from Lima. However, older, less-important tournaments were previously held in Callao.
1912	Úrvalsdeild	club league		Association football	Iceland	
1913	Challenge Trophy	club trophy (today amateur)	Connaught Cup 1913–1925; Challenge Trophy 1926–1954; Challenge Trophy & Carling Cup 1954–1961; Challenge Trophy 1962-	Association football	Canada	Strictly amateur since 1962.
1914	Collingwood Cup	university trophy	1914–	Association football	Northern Ireland, Republic of Ireland	
1914	Manning Cup	schools fixture	Manning Cup, 1914–	Association football	Jamaica	annual contest among Secondary High Schools in the Kingston, St. Andrew and St. Catherine parishes of Jamaica.
1914	Lamar Hunt U.S. Open Cup	club trophy	National Challenge Cup (1914); Lamar Hunt U.S. Open Cup (1999–)	Association football	United States	Oldest association football competition in the United States of America.
1916	Copa América	national team trophy	South American Football Championship (1916–1967); Copa América (1975–)	Association football	South America	Oldest non-European association football competition in the world.
1917	All Japan High School Soccer Tournament	high school tournament	—	Association football	Japan	
1917	Coupe de France	club trophy	—	Association football	France	
1921	Kentish Cup	international (services)		Association football	Europe	Inter-Services. Oldest international military association football tournament.
1921	FAI Cup	club trophy	1921–	Association football	Republic of Ireland	
1921	Egypt Cup	club trophy	1921–	Association football	Egypt	Oldest association football competition in Africa.
1921	Malaysia Cup	club trophy	1921– southern champ, Singapore FA and the northern champ, Selangor FA	Association football	Malaysia	Oldest football competition in the ASEAN
1921	Emperor's Cup	club trophy		Association football	Japan	
1922	Coppa Italia	club trophy	—	Association football	Italy	
1923	Totty Cup	primary school tournament	post-1947 for primary schools	Association football	England	
1925	Swiss Cup	club trophy		Association football	Switzerland	
1925	Polish Cup	club trophy	1925; 1951–	Association football	Poland	
1929	La Liga	club League	National Championships 1929 –	Association football	Spain	
1930	FIFA World Cup	national team trophy	1930 (Jules Rimet trophy); 1974 (Current trophy)	Association Football	FIFA	
1935	DFB-Pokal	club trophy	1935; 1952 (resume after Second world war)	Association football	Germany	
1955	UEFA Champions League	club continental trophy	1955 (Old Trophy); 1967 (Current "big ears" trophy)	Association Football	Europe	The oldest club's continental competition still exist. Formerly known as European Cup before 1992.
1956	AFC Asian Cup	national team trophy	—	Association football	Asia	The second-oldest continental championship after Copa America
1960	UEFA European Championship	national team trophy	—	Association football	Europe	
1960	Copa Libertadores	club continental trophy	–	Association football	South America	
1963	Bundesliga	club league	—	Association football	Germany	
1964	Jaturamitr Samakkee	high school traditional match	—	Association football	Thailand	The competition consists of 4 oldest boys school in Bangkok: Assumption College, Bangkok Christian College, Suankularb Wittayalai School and Debsirin School.
1967	AFC Champions League Elite	club continental trophy	—	Association football	Asia	

=== Australian rules football ===
Year (Date)	Competition	Type	First Trophy, Years	Original code	Location	Notes & references
1858 (7 August)	Melbourne Grammar School-Scotch College Cordner-Eggleston Cup, 1989–	schools fixture	Cordner-Eggleston Cup	experimental rules	Melbourne, Australia	
1877 (30 April)	South Australian Football Association	club league	Thomas Seymour Hill Premiership Trophy	Australian rules football	Adelaide, South Australia	Oldest Australian rules football league and earliest governing body. The most influential footballing body in South Australia.
1877 (17 May)	Victorian Football Association	club league		Victorian rules	Melbourne, Australia	Most influential early governing body for Australian rules football in Victoria. Known as the Victorian Football League since 1996.
1879 (12 June)	Tasmanian Football League	club league		Victorian rules	Hobart, Tasmania, Australia	Some discontinuity, most recently dormant between 2001 and 2008.
1881 (10 June)	Bendigo Football League	club league		Victorian rules	Bendigo, Australia	Includes the Castlemaine football club, second oldest football club in Australia.
1883	Black Diamond Football League	club league	Black Diamond Challenge Cup, 1888–	Australian rules football	Newcastle, New South Wales, Australia	Trophy donated to the league by Newcastle's Richmond Tobacco Co., claims to be the longest running football trophy in Australia.
1885	West Australian Football League	club league		Australian rules football	Perth, Western Australia	
1888	Broken Hill Football League	club league		Australian rules football	Broken Hill, New South Wales, Australia	
1893	Ballarat Football Association	club league		Australian rules football	Ballarat, Victoria	
1896	Goldfields Football League	club league		Australian rules football	Kalgoorlie, Western Australia	
1896	Victorian Football League/Australian Football League	club league	Flag 1895-; AFL Premiership Cup, 1959–	Australian rules football	Victoria, Australia (national since 1990)	Now the game's premier competition and highest governing body.
1903	Sydney AFL	club league		Australian rules football	Sydney, Australia	
1904	AFL Queensland State League	club league		Australian rules football	Brisbane, Australia	

=== Rugby ===
Year (Date)	Competition	Type	First Trophy, Years	Original code	Location	Notes & references
1858 (11 December)	Edinburgh Academy vs Merchiston Castle School	schools fixture		Rugby football	Edinburgh, Scotland	
1872	The Varsity Match	University fixture	Bowring Bowl	Rugby football	England	The Varsity Match is an annual rugby union fixture played between the universities of Oxford and Cambridge in England.
1874	United Hospitals Challenge Cup	club trophy	United Hospitals Challenge Cup – 1874–	Rugby football	Surrey, England	Oldest rugby football competition in the world.
1875	Bromsgrove–KES	schools fixture	Siviter-Smith Cup, 1935–	Rugby football	Bromsgrove/Birmingham, England	Later trophy donated by Paul Siviter-Smith, a Birmingham businessman, who had sons at both schools.
1876 (17 March)	Ulster Schools Cup	cup tournament	Schools Cup 1876–	Rugby football	Ravenhill, Belfast, Northern Ireland	
1878	Army Navy Match	Inter-Services Competition	The Babcock Trophy	Rugby football	England	
1879 (10 March)	Calcutta Cup	international challenge		Rugby football	England/Scotland	Competed for by the England and Scotland international rugby teams annually.
1883	Home Nations Championship	international tournament		Rugby football	Home Nations	It is an annual international Rugby union competition between Home nations. It is also the oldest international sport tournament ever competed between Home Nations. But now, It became the Six Nations Championship with the addition of France and Italy.
1883	Auckland Premier	club league		Rugby football	Auckland, New Zealand	The winner of the competition has been awarded the Gallaher Shield since 1922.
1889	Currie Cup	provincial tournament	Currie Cup, 1889–	Rugby football	South Africa	Oldest provincial rugby union competition in the world, and oldest national rugby union competition in the southern hemisphere.
1901	New South Wales Suburban Rugby Union	club league		Rugby union	Sydney, Australia	
1904	Ranfurly Shield	provincial challenge	Ranfurly Shield, 1902	Rugby union	New Zealand	First won by Auckland in 1902, and first challenged for in 1904.

=== Rugby league ===
Year (Date)	Competition	Type	First Trophy, Years	Original code	Location	Notes & references
1895	Rugby Football League/Super League	club league	Rugby Football League Championship 1895–	Rugby league	England	
1896	Challenge Cup	club league		Rugby league	Europe	
1908	NSWRL/National Rugby League	club league		Rugby league	Sydney, Australia	
1908	Queensland Rugby League	club league		Rugby league	Brisbane, Australia	
1908	The Ashes	international challenge		Rugby league	Australia & Great Britain	
1910	New Zealand Rugby League	club league	Rugby League Shield 1910–	Rugby league	Auckland, New Zealand	
1910	Newcastle Rugby League	club league		Rugby league	Newcastle, New South Wales, Australia	
1911	Illawarra Rugby League	club league		Rugby league	Illawarra, New South Wales, Australia	

=== Other ===
Year (Date)	Competition	Type	First Trophy, Years	Original code	Current Code	Location	Notes & references
1875 (13 November)	The Game	Interscholastic match	1875	modified Rugby union	American football	United States	
1887	All-Ireland Senior Football Championship	inter-county cup	1928	Gaelic football	Gaelic football		
1893 (Boxing Day/ Christmas Day (1893–98))	Scarborough Fisherman v Fireman football match	Cup	The Silver Cup, 1901	Experimental Rules	Experimental Rules	Scarborough, England	Organised as a charity football match to raise money for the Evelyn and Maud that sank. Still played annually today to raise money for the Fisherman and Fireman fund.
1898	Yates Cup	college league		Canadian football	Canadian football	Ontario, Canada	The Ontario University Athletics football trophy and oldest football trophy in North America.
1902 (1 or 2 January)	Rose Bowl Game	bowl game		American football	American football	Pasadena, California, United States	
1909	Grey Cup	Originally national club trophy; now national league		"Rugby football" (early form of Canadian football)	Canadian football	Canada	Now the championship trophy of the Canadian Football League.

== Defunct competitions ==
Years	Date	Competition	Type	First trophy awarded, years	Original code	Location	Notes
1851 only	25 January	93rd Regiment v. Edinburgh University FC	one-off match	Medallion, 1851 only	unknown	Edinburgh	Medallion was given by the losing side (Edinburgh) to the winning side (93rd Regiment).
1860 – c. 1968		House Football Cup	intramural competition	House Football Cup, 1860 – c. 1968	Eton field game	Eton College	
1861–1876	December	Caledonian Challenge Cup	club trophy	Caledonian Challenge Cup, 1861–1864	Melbourne Rules	Melbourne, Australia	
1867 only		Youdan Cup	club trophy	Youdan Cup, 1867	Sheffield rules	Sheffield, England	
1868 only		Cromwell Cup	club trophy	Cromwell Cup, 1868	Sheffield rules	Sheffield, England	
1880–1890		Queensland Football Association	club league	1880	Victorian rules	Brisbane, Queensland	
1880–1893		New South Wales Football Association	club league	1880	Victorian rules	Sydney, New South Wales	
1882–?		Northern Football Association	club league	?	Victorian rules	Launceston, Tasmania	
1884–1984		British Home Championship	international tournament	British International Championship trophy, 1936–1984	Association football	Home Nations (UK)	oldest international association football tournament in the world, and held until the 1983–84 season
1884–1924		American Cup	club trophy		Association football	United States	
1888–1956		Netherlands Football League Championship	club league	?	Association football		Replaced with Eredivisie for the 1956–1957 season
1890–2013		Scottish Football League	club league	?	Association football	Scotland	
1891–2001		Rovers Cup	club trophy	Rovers Cup	Association football	Mumbai, India	Third oldest football tournament in Asia (opened only for British army teams until 1911); organized by the WIFA from 1911 to 2001.
1894 only		Taça D. Carlos I	club trophy		Association football	Portugal	The first football cup played on the Iberian Peninsula.
1897–1911		Challenge Cup	club trophy		Association football	Austria-Hungary	
1900–1903		Copa Macaya	club trophy		Association football	Catalonia	Replaced with Catalan championship for the 1903–1904 season
1900–1904		Tagblatt Pokal	club trophy		Association football	Lower Austria, Austria-Hungary	
1900–1907		Coupe Van der Straeten Ponthoz	club trophy		Association football	Europe	Replaced with Coupe Jean Dupuich for the 1907–1908 season
1914–2007		Lila Devi Shield	primary school tournament		Association football	Mymensingh, Bangladesh	
1914–c. 2000		Surya Kanta Shield	club trophy		Association football	Mymensingh, Bangladesh	
1914–1950		Dutch East Indies Championship	club league		Association football	Dutch East Indies (now Indonesia)	
1916–2016	—	Kor Royal Cup	club trophy	—	Association football	Thailand	
1955 — 1971	—	Inter-Cities Fairs Cup	Club continental competition	1958	Association football	Europe	UEFA Abolished it and merge with UEFA Cup (Europa League)
1960 — 1999	—	UEFA Cup Winners' Cup	club continental competition	—	Association football	Europe	Qualification of only domestic cup winners.

== See also ==
- List of association football competitions
- Timeline of association football
