= Georg Braun (footballer) =

Austrian footballer (1907–1963)

Personal information
- Date of birth: 22 February 1907
- Place of birth: Vienna, Austria-Hungary
- Date of death: 22 September 1963 (aged 56)
- Place of death: Linz, Austria
- Height: 1.72 m (5 ft 8 in)
- Position: Forward

Youth career
- 1922–1923: Daunaustadt

Senior career*
Years	Team	Apps	(Gls)
1923–1925	SV Straßenbahn Wien		
1925–1935	Wiener AC		
1935	SC Wacker Wien		
1935–1939	Rennes	124	(6)
1939	LASK		

International career
1928–1935	Austria	13	(1)

Managerial career
- 1946–1952: LASK Linz
- Öberösterreichischer Fußballverband
- Ethiopia
- 1956–1957: SK VÖEST Linz
- SV Grün-Weiß Micheldorf
- * Club domestic league appearances and goals

Georg Braun (22 February 1907 – 22 September 1963) was an Austrian football player and coach who played the 1934 FIFA World Cup with Austria.

== Club career ==
Born and raised in Vienna, in the vicinity of the Prater, Braun played 10 years for local side Wiener AC, with whom he reached the 1931 Mitropa Cup Final, which they lost to city rivals First Vienna. He once won the league title with WAC.

== International career ==
Nicknamed Schurl, Braun was part of Austria national team at the 1934 FIFA World Cup and played the match for the third place.

He earned 13 caps between 1928 and 1935, scoring one goal against Hungary on 2 October 1932

== Honours ==
Wiener AC

- Austrian Cup: 1931
