= 1914–15 Austrian First Class =

4th season of top-tier football league in Austria

Austrian First Class
- Season: 1914–15
- Champions: Wiener AC (1st Austrian title)
- Matches played: 45
- Goals scored: 213 (4.73 per match)
- Top goalscorer: Franz Heinzl (12 goals)

The 1914–15 Austrian First Class season was the fourth season of top-tier football in Austria. It was won by Wiener AC.

== League standings ==
Pos	Team	Pld	W	D	L	GF	GA	GD	Pts
1	Wiener AC	9	8	0	1	46	9	+37	16
2	Wiener AF	9	7	1	1	30	14	+16	15
3	SK Rapid Wien	9	4	2	3	23	16	+7	10
4	SV Amateure	9	4	1	4	15	11	+4	9
5	ASV Hertha	9	4	1	4	15	22	−7	9
6	Floridsdorfer AC	9	3	3	3	22	22	0	9
7	SC Rudolfshügel	9	4	0	5	21	26	−5	8
8	Wiener Sportclub	9	2	2	5	13	26	−13	6
9	SC Wacker	9	1	3	5	13	22	−9	5
10	1. Simmeringer SC	9	1	1	7	15	45	−30	3

Source: rsssf.com

== Results ==
Home \ Away	AMA	FLO	HER	RAP	RUD	SIM	WAK	WAC	WAF	SPO
SV Amateure		0–0	0–2		3–0			2–0		1–0
Floridsdorfer AC					4–2	2–1		5–7	3–6	
ASV Hertha		0–4				4–2		0–5	2–3	1–1
SK Rapid Wien	4–1	3–1	3–1		2–3	7–3	2–2	0–2	2–2	0–1
SC Rudolfshügel			1–2							6–1
Simmeringer SC	2–7						4–2			2–2
SC Wacker	1–0	0–0	3–3		3–4			1–4	1–4	4–2
Wiener AC					3–0	15–0				9–1
Wiener AF	2–1				7–1	2–0		0–1		
Wiener Sportclub		3–3							3–4	

Legend: Blue = home team win; Yellow = draw; Red = away team win.
