= Karl Geyer =

Austrian footballer and coach (1899–1998)

Personal information
- Date of birth: 24 March 1899
- Date of death: 21 February 1998 (aged 98)
- Position: Striker

Senior career*
Years	Team	Apps	(Gls)
1914–1919	SC Donaustadt		
1919–1920	Wiener AC		
1920–1929	Amateure/Austria Wien		

International career
1921–1928	Austria	17	(0)

Managerial career
- 1931–1933: Wiener AC
- 1934–1935: SV Donau Wien
- 1935–1936: SC Wacker Wien
- 1936–1938: SC Diana
- 1938–1939: SK Brann
- 1945: FK Austria Wien
- 1955–1956: Austria
- * Club domestic league appearances and goals

Karl "Vogerl" Geyer (24 March 1899 – 21 February 1998) was an Austrian international footballer and coach. He was the coach of the Austria national football team from 1955–1956.
