= Richard Hanke =

German footballer

Walter Hanke
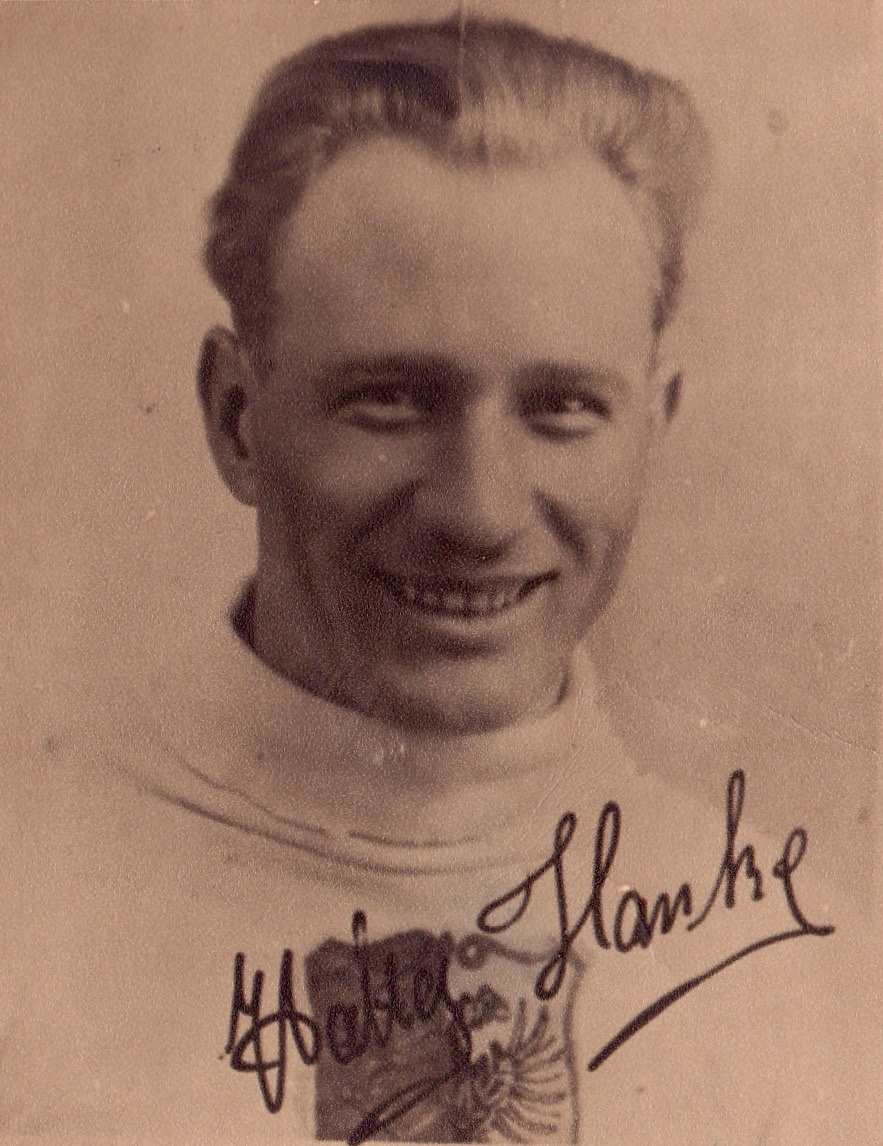
- Walter Hanke, in 1978

Personal information
- Date of birth: 18 March 1910
- Place of birth: Breslau, German Empire
- Date of death: 2 September 1980 (aged 70)
- Position: Forward

Senior career*
Years	Team	Apps	(Gls)
(...)–1931	Breslau 06		
1931	Wiener AC		
1932–1934	DSV Saaz		
1934–35	SK Prostějov		
1935–1937	FC Metz	49	(15)
1937–1939	Stade Rennes	52	(15)

International career
1930	Germany	1	(1)
- * Club domestic league appearances and goals

Richard (real name: Walter) Hanke (18 March 1910 – 2 September 1980) was a German international footballer. He left Germany and went professional in 1931 which was most unusual at the time, spending eight seasons in Austria, Czechoslovakia and France.

Soon after joining Wiener AC he was in the team that finished runners-up in the 1931 Mitropa Cup. He scored in both finals but asked for a transfer only a few weeks later. Hanke subsequently joined DSV Saaz during that same season. He also played for DSV Saaz for several years in a league organized by the German Football Association for Bohemia Deutscher Fußball-Verband für Böhmen, which was a football league primarily for German clubs in the Sudetenland. In the 1932/33 season, he even became the second top scorer in the league. Unfortunately, the number of goals is not recorded—only the ranking of the scorers. In later years, he was with SK Prostějov for a while and then, during the second half of the 1930s, found success in France.

Hanke has signed autograph pictures as Walter Hanke. For unknown reasons, he was mistakenly referred to as Richard in later years.

Some sources have confused Walter and Josef Hanke, an Austrian player who was with a couple of (different) French clubs at the same time.
