= Tagblatt Pokal =

The Tagblatt-Pokal was the first football competition in Austria played in a league format. It was founded by the Neue Wiener Tagblatt, and was restricted to clubs in Vienna. Nevertheless, and despite the existence of the Challenge Cup, which was open to all football clubs in Austria-Hungary, it is regarded as a forerunner of the Austrian football championship. The trophy was awarded permanently to Wiener AC in 1903 after they had won it three times.

== Divisions ==
It was organised in a first division (Erste Klasse) and two parallel second divisions (Zweite Klasse A and Zweite Klasse B). It was planned that the bottom two clubs from the top division should be relegated, and that the winners of the two second divisions should be promoted.

== Seasons ==
=== 1900–01 ===
Pl.	Club	P	W	D	L	goals	diff.	points
1.	Wiener AC	12	7	2	3	26-15		16
2.	Vienna Cricket & FC	12	6	3	3	21-17		14
3.	First Vienna FC 1894	12	5	3	4	31-18		13
4.	Wiener FC 1898	12	1	2	9	6-34		4

Promoted:

- SK Graphia Wien
- Hernalser F.u.AC Vorwärts

AC Viktoria Wien was also placed in the top division, but after turning down the participation joined the competition in Spring 1901 and played at the second level, and were relegated to that level for the 1901-02 season.

=== 1901–02 ===
Pl.	Club	P	W	D	L	goals	diff.	points
1.	Wiener AC	8	6	2	0	19- 2		14
2.	First Vienna FC 1894	8	5	2	1	22- 4		12
3.	Wiener FC 1898	8	2	3	3	11- 9		7
4.	SK Graphia Wien	8	1	2	5	1-26		4
5.	Hernalser F.u.AC Vorwärts	8	0	3	5	3-15		3

=== 1902–03 ===
Pl.	Club	P	W	D	L	goals	diff.	points
1.	Wiener AC	8	6	1	1	32- 6		13
2.	First Vienna FC 1894	8	5	2	1	19-11		12
3.	Wiener FC 1898	8	2	2	4	12-23		6
4.	SK Graphia Wien	8	2	1	5	13-25		5
5.	Deutscher SV Wien	8	0	0	8	4-15		0

Play-off: SK Rapid Wien – Deutscher Sportverein 3-0

Promoted: SK Rapid Wien

=== 1903–04 ===
- Wiener AC - First Vienna FC 1894 2-0
- SK Graphia Wien - Deutscher SV 4-0
- Wiener AC - SK Rapid Wien 15-2

apparent later results

- SK Rapid Wien - Vienna Cricket & FC 2-1
- First Vienna FC 1894 - SK Rapid Wien 2-2

First Vienna and Vienna Cricket left the Fußball-Union and joined the ÖFV, Olympia followed them, and the championship was abandoned.

== Tagblatt Pokal winners ==
- 1901 Wiener AC
- 1902 Wiener AC
- 1903 Wiener AC
