= Karl Rainer =

Austrian footballer and coach (1901–1987)

Personal information
- Date of birth: 1 July 1901
- Date of death: 9 June 1987 (aged 85)
- Position: Defender

Senior career*
Years	Team	Apps	(Gls)
- FC Sturm 07
–1938	Vienna		
1940	Vienna		

International career
1924–1935	Austria	39	(0)

Managerial career
- SC Wacker Wien
- Wiener AC
- 1948–1949: Vienna
- * Club domestic league appearances and goals

Karl Rainer (1 July 1901 – 9 June 1987) was an Austrian international footballer and coach.
