= Mitropa Cup =

- The trophy awarded to champions
- Organiser(s): List: (Austria) AFL; (Czechoslovakia) CFA; (Hungary) HFF; (Socialist Federal Republic of Yugoslavia) FAY
- Founded: 1927
- Abolished: 1992; 34 years ago
- Region: Central Europe
- Teams: 4 (1992)
- Related competitions: Latin Cup; Balkans Cup
- Last champions: (Socialist Federal Republic of Yugoslavia) (Bosnia and Herzegovina) Borac Banja Luka (1992)
- Most championships: (Hungary) Vasas (6 titles)

The Mitropa Cup, officially called Coupe d'Europe Centrale, Mitteleuropäischer Pokal or Central European Cup, was one of the first international major European football cups for club sides. It was contested by teams from the successor states of Austria-Hungary. After World War II in 1951 the tournament was renamed Zentropa Cup just for one season; in 1958 the name was changed to Danube Cup, again only for one season. The tournament was discontinued after 1992.

The most successful club is Vasas with six titles.

== History ==
Nations which participated in the Mitropa Cup (1927–1940)

This "International" competition for football clubs was founded in 1897 in Vienna. The Challenge Cup was invented by John Gramlick Sr., a co-founder of the Vienna Cricket and Football-Club. In this cup competition all clubs of the Austro-Hungarian Empire that normally would not meet could take part, though actually almost only clubs from the Empire's three major cities Vienna, Budapest and Prague participated. The Challenge Cup was carried out until the year 1911 and is today seen as the predecessor to the Mitropa Cup and consequently the European Cup and Champions League. The last winner of the cup was Wiener Sport-Club, one of the oldest and most traditional football clubs of Austria where the cup still remains.

The idea of a European cup competition was shaped after World War I which brought the defeat and collapse of the Austro-Hungarian Empire. The centre of this idea were the Central European countries that, at this time, were still leading in continental football. In the early 1920s they introduced professional leagues, the first continental countries to do so. Austria started in 1924, followed by Czechoslovakia in 1925 and Hungary in 1926. In order to strengthen the dominance of these countries in European football and to financially support the professional clubs, the introduction of the Mitropa Cup was decided at a meeting in Venice on 17 July, following the initiative of the head of the Austrian Football Association (ÖFB), Hugo Meisl. Moreover, the creation of a European Cup for national teams – that unlike the Challenge Cup and the Mitropa Cup would not be annual – was also part of the agreement. The first matches were played on 14 August 1927. The competition was between the top professional teams of Central Europe.

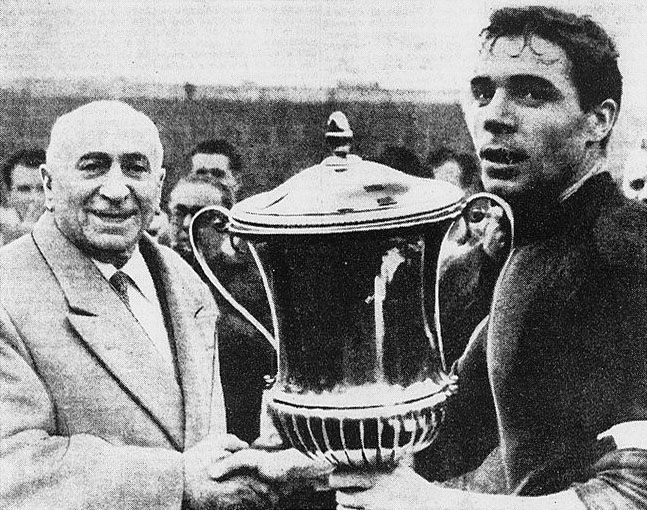
The president and the captain of Bologna, Renato Dall'Ara (left) and Mirko Pavinato (right), with the trophy of the 1961 season.

Initially two teams each from Austria, Hungary, Czechoslovakia and Yugoslavia entered, competing in a knock-out competition. The countries involved could either send their respective league winners and runners-up, or league winners and cup winners to take part. The first winners were the Czech side, AC Sparta Prague. In 1929 Italian teams replaced the Yugoslavian ones. The competition was expanded to four teams from each of the competing countries in 1934. Other countries were invited to participate – Switzerland in 1936, and Romania, Switzerland and Yugoslavia in 1937. Austria was withdrawn from the competition following the Anschluss in 1938. In 1939, prior to the start of World War II, the cup involved only eight teams (two each from Hungary, Czechoslovakia and Italy and one each from Romania and Yugoslavia). The level of the competing nations is clearly shown by Italy's two World Cup titles (1934 & 1938), Czechoslovakia's (1934) and Hungary's (1938) World Cup final, and Austria's (1934) and Yugoslavia's (1930) semi-finals. Of the eleven different national teams that reached the semi-finals of the first three World Cups, five were nations that participated in the Mitropa Cup.

A tournament was started in 1940, but abandoned before the final match due to World War II. Again, only eight teams competed, three each from Hungary and Yugoslavia and two from Romania. Hungarian Ferencváros and Romanian Rapid (which had won on lots after three draws) qualified for the final, but did not meet because the northern part of Transylvania (lost shortly after World War I) was ceded to Hungary from Romania.

== Champions ==
=== Finals ===
Season	Country	Champions	Result	Runners-up	Country
1927	Czechoslovakia	Sparta Prague	6–2	Rapid Wien	Austria
1927	Czechoslovakia	Sparta Prague	1–2	Rapid Wien	Austria
1928	Hungary	Ferencváros	7–1	Rapid Wien	Austria
1928	Hungary	Ferencváros	3–5	Rapid Wien	Austria
1929	Hungary	Újpest	5–1	Slavia Prague	Czechoslovakia
1929	Hungary	Újpest	2–2	Slavia Prague	Czechoslovakia
1930	Austria	Rapid Wien	2–0	Sparta Prague	Czechoslovakia
1930	Austria	Rapid Wien	2–3	Sparta Prague	Czechoslovakia
1931	Austria	First Vienna	3–2	Wiener AC	Austria
1931	Austria	First Vienna	2–1	Wiener AC	Austria
1932	Italy	Bologna	—N/a	None (Note: The final was scratched and Bologna were awarded the cup after Slavia Prague and Juventus were both ejected from the competition.)	
1933	Austria	Austria Wien	1–2	Ambrosiana-Inter	Italy
1933	Austria	Austria Wien	3–1	Ambrosiana-Inter	Italy
1934	Italy	Bologna	2–3	Admira Wien	Austria
1934	Italy	Bologna	5–1	Admira Wien	Austria
1935	Czechoslovakia	Sparta Prague	1–2	Ferencváros	Hungary
1935	Czechoslovakia	Sparta Prague	3–0	Ferencváros	Hungary
1936	Austria	Austria Wien	0–0	Sparta Prague	Czechoslovakia
1936	Austria	Austria Wien	1–0	Sparta Prague	Czechoslovakia
1937	Hungary	Ferencváros	4–2	Lazio	Italy
1937	Hungary	Ferencváros	5–4	Lazio	Italy
1938	Czechoslovakia	Slavia Prague	2–2	Ferencváros	Hungary
1938	Czechoslovakia	Slavia Prague	2–0	Ferencváros	Hungary
1939	Hungary	Újpest	4–1	Ferencváros	Hungary
1939	Hungary	Újpest	2–2	Ferencváros	Hungary
1940	None (Note: The final between Rapid București and Ferencváros was scheduled to take place in July 1940. However, due to the beginning of World War II, including the Soviet occupation of Bessarabia and Northern Bukovina in June and July of 1940, it was cancelled.)		N/A	Rapid București; Ferencváros	Romania; Hungary
1941–50	Not held				
1951 (Note: The 1951 edition of Mitropa Cup was unofficial and only for this tournament was named Zentropa Cup.)	Austria	Rapid Wien	3–2	Admira Wien	Austria
1952–54	Not held				
1955	Hungary	Vörös Lobogó	6–0	ÚDA Prague	Czechoslovakia
1955	Hungary	Vörös Lobogó	2–1	ÚDA Prague	Czechoslovakia
1956	Hungary	Vasas	3–3	Rapid Wien	Austria
1956	Hungary	Vasas	1–1	Rapid Wien	Austria
1956	Hungary	Vasas	9–2	Rapid Wien	Austria
1957	Hungary	Vasas	4–0	Vojvodina	Yugoslavia
1957	Hungary	Vasas	1–2	Vojvodina	Yugoslavia
1958 (Note: The 1958 edition of Mitropa Cup was unofficial and only for this tournament was named Danube Cup.)	Yugoslavia	Red Star Belgrade	4–1	Rudá Hvězda Brno	Czechoslovakia
1958	Yugoslavia	Red Star Belgrade	3–2	Rudá Hvězda Brno	Czechoslovakia
1959	Hungary	Honvéd	4–3	MTK	Hungary
1959	Hungary	Honvéd	2–2	MTK	Hungary
1960	Hungary (Note: It was contested as a competition between countries and there was no elimination. The five competing countries each sent six teams each to the competition and their aggregate results counted toward their country's tally.)				
1961	Italy	Bologna	2–2	Slovan Nitra	Czechoslovakia
1961	Italy	Bologna	3–0	Slovan Nitra	Czechoslovakia
1962	Hungary	Vasas	5–1	Bologna	Italy
1962	Hungary	Vasas	1–2	Bologna	Italy
1963	Hungary	MTK Budapest	2–1	Vasas	Hungary
1963	Hungary	MTK Budapest	1–1	Vasas	Hungary
1964	Czechoslovakia	Sparta Prague	0–0	Slovan Bratislava	Czechoslovakia
1964	Czechoslovakia	Sparta Prague	2–0	Slovan Bratislava	Czechoslovakia
1965	Hungary	Vasas	1–0	Fiorentina	Italy
1966	Italy	Fiorentina	1–0	Jednota Trenčín	Czechoslovakia
1966–67	Czechoslovakia	Spartak Trnava	2–3	Újpesti Dózsa	Hungary
1966–67	Czechoslovakia	Spartak Trnava	3–1	Újpesti Dózsa	Hungary
1967–68	Yugoslavia	Red Star Belgrade	0–1	Spartak Trnava	Czechoslovakia
1967–68	Yugoslavia	Red Star Belgrade	4–1	Spartak Trnava	Czechoslovakia
1968–69	Czechoslovakia	Inter Bratislava	4–1	Sklo Union Teplice	Czechoslovakia
1968–69	Czechoslovakia	Inter Bratislava	0–0	Sklo Union Teplice	Czechoslovakia
1969–70	Hungary	Vasas	1–2	Inter Bratislava	Czechoslovakia
1969–70	Hungary	Vasas	4–1	Inter Bratislava	Czechoslovakia
1970–71	Yugoslavia	Čelik Zenica	3–1	Austria Salzburg	Austria
1971–72	Yugoslavia	Čelik Zenica	0–0	Fiorentina	Italy
1971–72	Yugoslavia	Čelik Zenica	1–0	Fiorentina	Italy
1972–73	Hungary	Tatabányai Bányász	2–1	Čelik Zenica	Yugoslavia
1972–73	Hungary	Tatabányai Bányász	2–1	Čelik Zenica	Yugoslavia
1973–74	Hungary	Tatabányai Bányász	3–2	ZVL Zilina	Czechoslovakia
1973–74	Hungary	Tatabányai Bányász	2–0	ZVL Zilina	Czechoslovakia
1974–75	Austria	Wacker Innsbruck	3–1	Honvéd	Hungary
1974–75	Austria	Wacker Innsbruck	2–1	Honvéd	Hungary
1975–76	Austria	Wacker Innsbruck	3–1	Velež Mostar	Yugoslavia
1975–76	Austria	Wacker Innsbruck	3–1	Velež Mostar	Yugoslavia
1976–77	Yugoslavia	Vojvodina	RR	Vasas	Hungary
1977–78	Yugoslavia	Partizan	1–0	Honvéd	Hungary
1978–79	Not played				
1979–80	Italy	Udinese	RR	Čelik Zenica	Yugoslavia
1980–81	Czechoslovakia	Tatran Prešov	RR	Csepel SC	Hungary
1981–82	Italy	Milan	RR	TJ Vítkovice	Czechoslovakia
1982–83	Hungary	Vasas	RR	ZVL Zilina	Czechoslovakia
1983–84	Austria	SC Eisenstadt	RR	Prishtina	Yugoslavia
1984–85	Yugoslavia	Iskra Bugojno	RR	Atalanta	Italy
1985–86	Italy	Pisa	2–0	Debrecen	Hungary
1986–87	Italy	Ascoli	1–0	Bohemians Prague	Czechoslovakia
1987–88	Italy	Pisa	3–0	Váci Izzó	Hungary
1988	Czechoslovakia	Baník Ostrava	2–1	Bologna	Italy
1988	Czechoslovakia	Baník Ostrava	2–1	Bologna	Italy
1990	Italy	Bari	1–0	Genoa	Italy
1991	Italy	Torino	2–1 (a.e.t)	Pisa	Italy
1992	Bosnia and Herzegovina	Borac Banja Luka	1–1 (a.e.t); 5–3 (p)	BVSC	Hungary

== Performances ==
Note: The 1960 edition is not included in the list because it was won by a nation rather than club.

=== By club ===
Club	Winners	Runner-up	Winning seasons	Runners-up seasons
(Hungary) Vasas	6	2	1956, 1957, 1962, 1965, 1970, 1983	1963, 1977
(Italy) Bologna	3	2	1932, 1934, 1961	1962, 1988
(Czechoslovakia) Sparta Prague	3	2	1927, 1935, 1964	1930, 1936
(Hungary) Ferencváros	2	4	1928, 1937	1935, 1938, 1939, 1940
(Austria) Rapid Wien	2	3	1930, 1951	1927, 1928, 1956
(Socialist Federal Republic of Yugoslavia) Čelik Zenica	2	2	1971, 1972	1973, 1980
(Hungary) MTK Budapest	2	1	1955, 1963	1959
(Hungary) Újpest	2	1	1929, 1939	1967
(Italy) Pisa	2	1	1986, 1987–88	1991
(Socialist Federal Republic of Yugoslavia) Red Star Belgrade	2	–	1958, 1968	–
Austria Wien	2	–	1933, 1936	–
(Austria) Wacker Innsbruck	2	–	1975, 1976	–
(Hungary) Tatabányai Bányász	2	–	1973, 1974	–
(Hungary) Budapest Honvéd	1	2	1959	1975, 1978
(Italy) Fiorentina	1	2	1966	1965, 1972
(Czechoslovakia) Spartak Trnava	1	1	1967	1968
(Czechoslovakia) Inter Bratislava	1	1	1969	1970
(Czechoslovakia) Slavia Prague	1	1	1938	1929
(Socialist Federal Republic of Yugoslavia) Vojvodina	1	1	1977	1957
(Socialist Federal Republic of Yugoslavia) Borac Banja Luka	1	–	1992	–
(Socialist Federal Republic of Yugoslavia) Iskra Bugojno	1	–	1985	–
(Socialist Federal Republic of Yugoslavia) Partizan	1	–	1978	–
(Italy) Milan	1	–	1982	–
(Italy) Torino	1	–	1991	–
(Italy) Udinese	1	–	1980	–
(Italy) Ascoli	1	–	1987	–
(Italy) Bari	1	–	1990	–
(Austria) SC Eisenstadt	1	–	1984	–
(Austria) First Vienna	1	–	1931	–
(Czechoslovakia) Baník Ostrava	1	–	1988	–
(Czechoslovakia) Tatran Prešov	1	–	1981	–
(Czechoslovakia) ZVL Zilina	–	2	–	1974, 1983
(Austria) SK Admira Wien	–	2	–	1934, 1951
(Austria) Wiener AC	–	1	–	1931
Austria Salzburg	–	1	–	1971
(Italy) Ambrosiana Inter	–	1	–	1933
(Italy) Lazio	–	1	–	1937
(Italy) Atalanta	–	1	–	1985
(Italy) Genoa	–	1	–	1990
(Czechoslovakia) ÚDA Prague	–	1	–	1955
(Czechoslovakia) Slovan Nitra	–	1	–	1961
(Czechoslovakia) Slovan Bratislava	–	1	–	1964
(Czechoslovakia) Jednota Trenčín	–	1	–	1966
(Czechoslovakia) Sklo Union Teplice	–	1	–	1969
(Czechoslovakia) TJ Vítkovice	–	1	–	1982
(Czechoslovakia) Bohemians Prague	–	1	–	1987
(Socialist Federal Republic of Yugoslavia) Velež Mostar	–	1	–	1976
(Socialist Federal Republic of Yugoslavia) Prishtina	–	1	–	1984
(Hungary) Csepel SC	–	1	–	1981
(Hungary) Debreceni MVSC	–	1	–	1986
(Hungary) Váci Izzó	–	1	–	1987–88
(Hungary) BVSC	–	1	–	1992
(Romania) Rapid București	–	1	–	1940

=== Titles by country ===
Country	Titles
Hungary	16
Italy	11
Czechoslovakia	8
Yugoslavia	8
Austria	7

== Top scorers (1927–1940) ==
=== By year ===
Year	Player	Goals	Played	Average
1927	(Czechoslovakia) Josef Silný	5	6	0.83
1928	(Hungary) Jozsef Takács II	10	6	1.66
1929	(Hungary) István Avar	10	7	1.42
1930	(Italy) Giuseppe Meazza	7	6	1.16
1931	(Austria) Heinrich Hiltl	7	7	1.00
1932	(Argentina) Renato Cesarini	5	4	1.25
1933	(Argentina) Raimundo Orsi	5	4	1.25
1933	(Czechoslovakia) František Kloz	5	4	1.25
1933	(Italy) Giuseppe Meazza	5	6	0.83
1933	(Austria) Matthias Sindelar	5	6	0.83
1934	(Italy) Carlo Reguzzoni	10	8	1.28
1935	(Hungary) György Sárosi	9	8	1.12
1936	(Italy) Giuseppe Meazza (3)	10	6	1.66
1937	(Hungary) György Sárosi	12	9	1.33
1938	(Czechoslovakia) Josef Bican	10	8	1.25
1939	(Hungary) Gyula Zsengellér	9	6	1.50
1940	(Hungary) György Sárosi (3)	6	2	3.00

=== All-time top scorers (1927–1940) ===
Rank	Player	Goals	Played	Average
1	(Hungary) György Sárosi	50	42	1.19
2	(Italy) Giuseppe Meazza	29	27	1.07
3	(Hungary) Gyula Zsengellér	24	19	1.26
4	(Austria) Matthias Sindelar	24	31	0.77
5	(Hungary) István Avar	19	24	0.79

== Top scorers (1951–1992) ==
=== By season ===
Season	Player	Club	Goals
1951	(Austria) Erich Probst	(Austria) Rapid Wien	5
1955	(Hungary) János Molnár	(Hungary) Vörös Lobogó	9
1955	(Hungary) Nándor Hidegkuti	(Hungary) Vörös Lobogó	9
1956	(Hungary) Lajos Csordás	(Hungary) Vasas	8
1957	(Austria) Johann Riegler	(Austria) Rapid Wien	5
1957	(Hungary) Dezső Bundzsák	(Hungary) Vasas	5
1959	(Hungary) Lajos Tichy	(Hungary) Budapest Honvéd	9
1960	(Socialist Federal Republic of Yugoslavia) Sulejman Rebac	(Socialist Federal Republic of Yugoslavia) Velez Mostar	4
1961	(Czechoslovakia) Milan Dolinský	(Czechoslovakia) Red Star Bratislava	7
1961	(Czechoslovakia) Viliam Hrnčár	(Czechoslovakia) Slovan Nitra	7
1962	(Denmark) Harald Nielsen	(Italy) Bologna	11
1963	(Hungary) Ferenc Machos	(Hungary) Vasas	7
1964	(Czechoslovakia) Václav Mašek	(Czechoslovakia) Sparta Prague	7
1965	(Hungary) Lajos Puskás	(Hungary) Vasas	3
1966	(Austria) Friedrich Rafreider	(Austria) Wiener Sport-Club	5
1966–67	(Hungary) Antal Dunai	(Hungary) Újpest	9
1967–68	(Socialist Federal Republic of Yugoslavia) Vojin Lazarević	(Socialist Federal Republic of Yugoslavia) Red Star Belgrade	5
1968–69	(Czechoslovakia) Pavel Stratil	(Czechoslovakia) Sklo Union Teplice	7
1969–70	(Hungary) János Farkas	(Hungary) Vasas	6
1970–71	(Socialist Federal Republic of Yugoslavia) Alojz Renić	(Socialist Federal Republic of Yugoslavia) Čelik Zenica	5
1971–72	(Italy) Luciano Chiarugi	(Italy) Fiorentina	5
1972–73	(Socialist Federal Republic of Yugoslavia) Alojz Renić (2)	(Socialist Federal Republic of Yugoslavia) Čelik Zenica	4
1973–74	(Hungary) Mihai Kyomyuves	(Hungary) FC Tatabánya	6
1974–75	(Czechoslovakia) Jaroslav Melichar	(Czechoslovakia) Sklo Union Teplice	3
1975–76	(Austria) Kurt Welzl	(Austria) FC Wacker Innsbruck	6
1976–77	(Hungary) István Kovács	(Hungary) Vasas	4
1977–78	(Socialist Federal Republic of Yugoslavia) Momčilo Vukotić	(Socialist Federal Republic of Yugoslavia) Partizan	3
1979–80	(Italy) Nerio Ulivieri	(Italy) Udinese	4
1980–81	(Hungary) László Lazsányi	(Hungary) Csepel SC	3
1981–82	(Czechoslovakia) Jiří Šourek	(Czechoslovakia) Vítkovice	3

== Mitropa Super Cup ==
Additionally, a "Mitropa Super Cup" was contested in 1989 between the winners of 1988 and 1989. Ostrava won the first leg 3–0 on 12 April 1989.

Year	Champion	Result	Runner-up
1989	(Czechoslovakia) Baník Ostrava	3–0	(Italy) Pisa
1989	(Czechoslovakia) Baník Ostrava	1–3 (a.e.t.)	(Italy) Pisa

== See also ==
- Latin Cup
- Balkans Cup
