= Ferdinand Frithum =

Austrian footballer and coach

Personal information
- Position: Forward

Senior career*
Years	Team	Apps	(Gls)
- Vienna

International career
1919	Austria	1	(0)

Managerial career
- 1926–1935: Vienna
- 1936–1937: Metz
- * Club domestic league appearances and goals

Ferdinand "Fritz" Frithum was an Austrian international footballer and coach.
