= Henri Hiltl =

Austrian footballer (1910–1982)

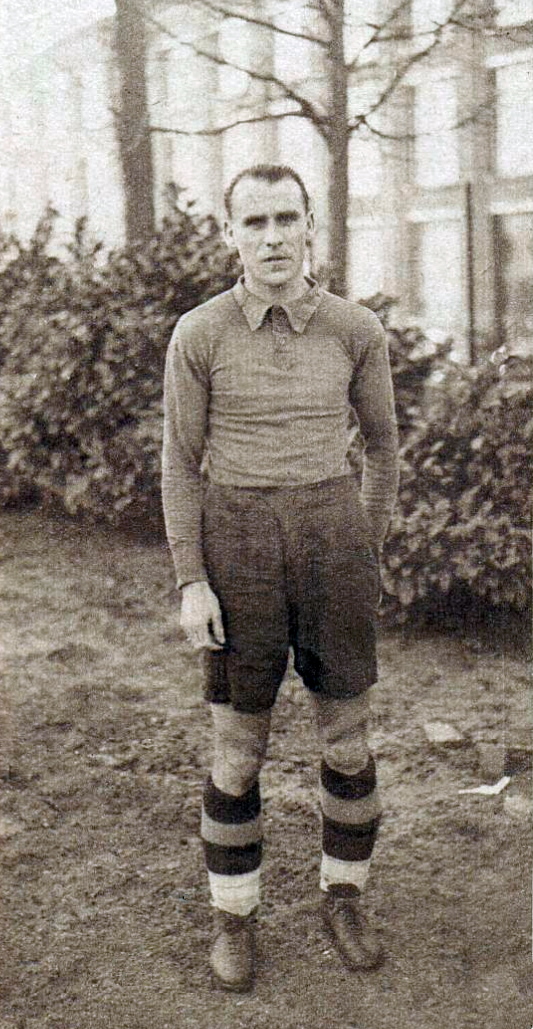

Personal information
- Date of birth: 8 October 1910
- Place of birth: Vienna, Austria-Hungary
- Place of death: 25 November 1982 (aged 72)
- Position: Striker

Senior career*
Years	Team	Apps	(Gls)
1925–1929	Brigittenauer AC	17	(5)
1929–1934	Wiener AC	82	(68)
1934–1939	Excelsior AC Roubaix	154	(82)
1939–1940	RC Paris		
1944–1948	CO Roubaix-Tourcoing	98	(49)
Total		351	(204)

International career
1931	Austria	1	(0)
1940–1944	France	2	(0)
- * Club domestic league appearances and goals

Henri Hiltl (born Heinrich Hiltl; 8 October 1910 – 25 November 1982) was an Austrian, naturalized French footballer who played as a forward.
