= Anton Brosenbauer =

Austrian footballer

Personal information
- Date of birth: 11 April 1909
- Position: Forward

Senior career*
| Years | Team | Apps | (Gls) |
| –1927 | Brigittenauer AC | | |
| 1928–1935 | Vienna | | |

International career
| 1930–1933 | Austria | 4 | (0) |
- * Club domestic league appearances and goals

Anton Brosenbauer (born 11 April 1909, date of death unknown) was an Austrian international footballer.
