= Challenge Cup (Austria-Hungary) =

- Founded: 1897
- Abolished: 1911; 114 years ago
- Region: Austro-Hungarian Empire
- Last champions: Wiener Sport-Club (1911)
- Most championships: Wiener AC (3 titles)

The Challenge Cup (German: Challenge-Cup, Hungarian: Challenge Kupa) was an international competition for football clubs of the Austro-Hungarian Empire that ran from 1897 to 1911.

== History ==
It was conceived in 1897 in Vienna by John Gramlick, who was one of the founders of Vienna Cricket and Football-Club. The competition was open for all clubs in the Austro-Hungarian Empire, but practically all the participating teams came from the three major cities Vienna, Budapest and Prague. It was played in a knockout format.

The trophy was to be kept by the first team to win it in three consecutive seasons. In 1903 the rule was changed and the trophy is now in the possession of its last winner Wiener Sport-Club. The Challenge Cup ceased in 1911. Today it is seen as the predecessor to the Austrian Cup (first held in 1918) and the Mitropa Cup, established in 1927.

== Champions ==
=== List of finals ===
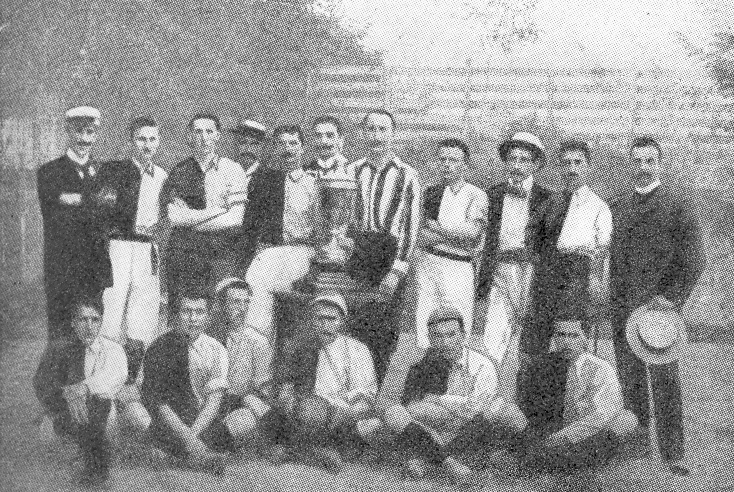
First Vienna FC, 1898–99 winners

Season	Champion	Score	Runner-up
1897–98	(Austria) Vienna Cricket	7–0	(Austria) Wiener FC 1898
1898–99	(Austria) First Vienna	4–1	(Austria) AC Viktoria Wien
1899–1900	(Austria) First Vienna	2–0	(Austria) Vienna Cricket
1900–01	(Austria) Wiener AC	1–0	(Bohemia) SK Slavia Prague
1901–02	(Austria) Vienna Cricket	2–1	(Hungary) Budapesti TC
1902–03	(Austria) Wiener AC	w/o	(Bohemia) ČAFC Královské
1903–04	(Austria) Wiener AC	7–0	(Austria) Vienna Cricket
1904–05	(Austria) Wiener SC	2–1	(Hungary) Magyar AC
1905–06	(Not held)		
1906–07	(Not held)		
1907–08	(Not held)		
1908–09	(Hungary) Ferencváros	2–1	(Austria) Wiener Sport-Club
1909–10	Not Held		
1910–11	(Austria) Wiener SC	3–0	(Hungary) Ferencváros

=== Titles by club ===
Country	Club	Titles	Winning season
Austria	Wiener AC	3	1900–01, 1902–03, 1903–04
Austria	Vienna Cricket FC	2	1897–98, 1901–02
Austria	Wiener Sport-Club	2	1904–05, 1910–11
Austria	First Vienna FC	2	1898–99, 1899–1900
Hungary	Ferencváros	1	1908–09

=== Titles by country ===
Country	Titles
Austria	9
Hungary	1

== See also ==
- Austrian Cup
- Mitropa Cup
- Balkans Cup
- Latin Cup
- European Railways Cup
