= Wiener AC =

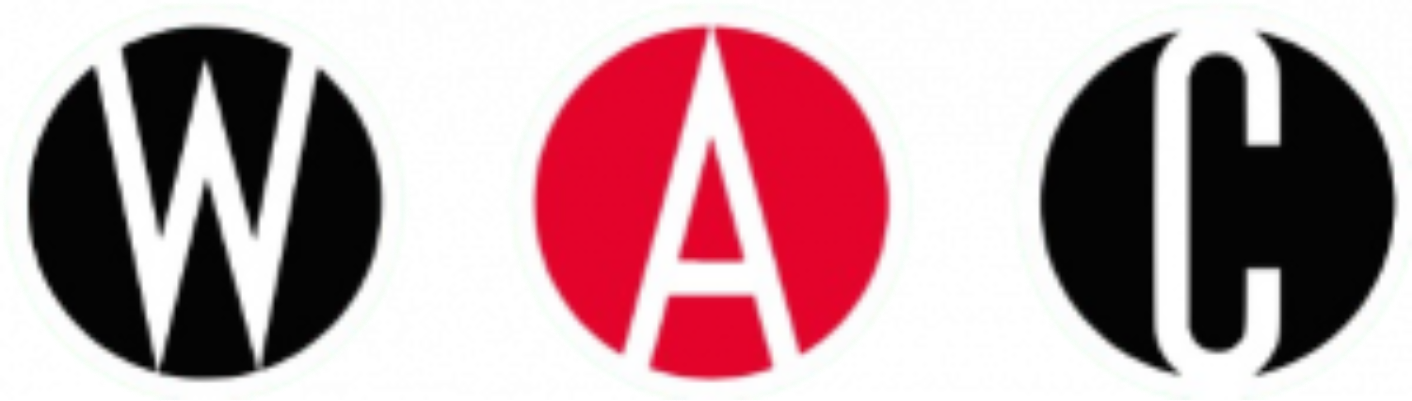
- Full name: Wiener Athletiksport Club
- Short name: WAC
- Founded: 1897; 1983
- Dissolved: No longer competes in football competitions.
- Ground: WAC Sportanlage, Vienna
- Website: http://www.wac.at/
Home colours	Away colours

Wiener Athletiksport Club, also known as Wiener AC or WAC, is an Austrian sports club in Vienna. It is particularly noted for its hockey team, which was established in 1900.

Its football team won the Austrian Championships and was Runner-up in the Mitropa Cup.

== History ==
The football section of the club was founded on 14 October 1897. By 1904, it had won the Challenge Cup and the Wiener Tagblatt Pokal three times each. They were the most important trophies in Austrian football at the time.

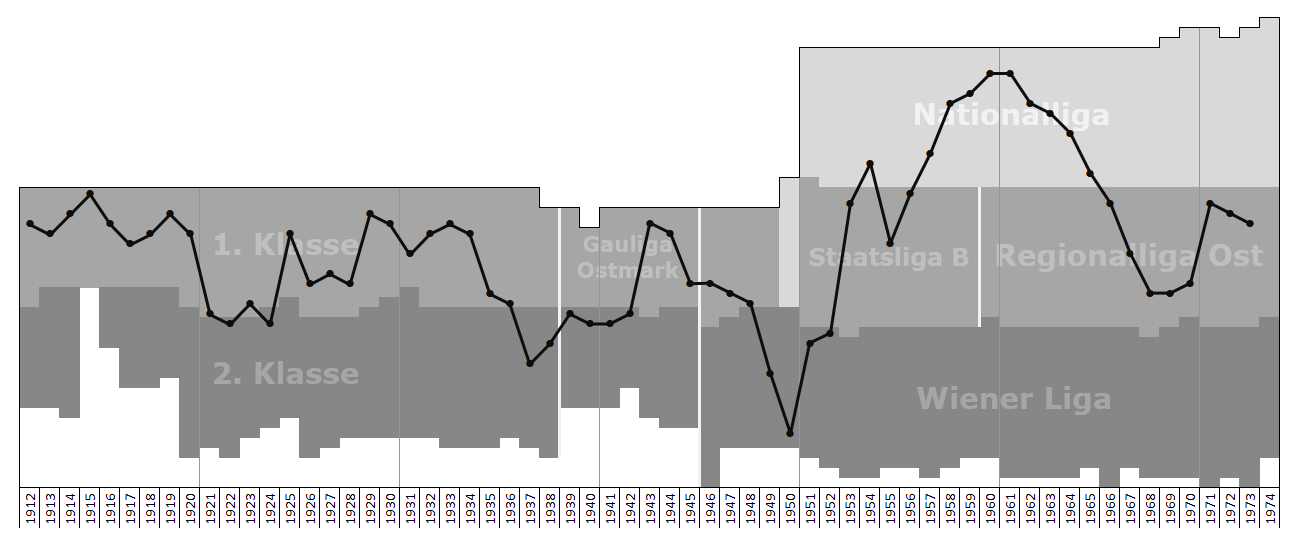
Historical chart of WAC league performance

In September 1910, most of the first team left the club to found a new club, Wiener AF. Despite this, Wiener AC finished fourth in the Austrian football championship 1910–11, although the new club finished higher.

The club won the Austrian football championship 1914–15, in which the ten clubs, due to the war, only played each other once each. Wiener AF finished in second place.

In 1928, the club reached the Austrian Cup final, losing 2–1 to SK Admira Wien.

In the 1930–31 season, Wiener AC won the Austrian Cup, which was played in a league format as the Wiener Winter Cup. As the winner of this competition, the club was qualified for the Mitropa Cup.

The club reached the final of the 1931 Mitropa Cup, but lost both legs of the final to First Vienna FC.

From 1936 to 1945, the club was also known as Schwarz-Rot Wien, name under which they won the 1937–38 Austrian Cup.

From 1942 to 1945, the club played in the Gauliga Ostmark (I).

In 1959, the club again won the Austrian Cup, beating SK Rapid Wien 2–0 in the final.

== FK Austria WAC Wien ==
From 1973–74 season, Wiener AC merged and formed a joint team with FK Austria Wien, which was called FK Austria WAC Wien until 1976–77 season, when Austria Wien decided to revert to their own club's traditional name. The results of the joint team are part of the Austria Wien football history.

In 1983, Wiener AC reactivated its football section, but never came back to Austrian Football Bundesliga and the club was taken over in 2002 by its sponsor, which changed its name to FK Rad Friendly Systems and then to FC Fireball United.

The club still has a football section, but it no longer competes in competitions.

== Honours ==
Challenge Cup

- Winners (3): 1900–01, 1902–03, 1903–04

Tagblatt Pokal

- Winners (3): 1900–01, 1901–02, 1902–03

Austrian Champions

- Winners (1): 1914–15

Austrian Cup

- Winners (3): 1930–31, 1937–38, 1958–59

Mitropa Cup

- Finalists (1): 1931

In 1938, the Austrian Cup was won by Schwarz-Rot Wien, which split off from Wiener AC and rejoined a few years later.

== Seasons in the top league of Austria ==
38 seasons: 1912–21, 1923, 1925–36, 1943–44, 1946–48, 1954 and 1957–65.

In addition, the Wiener AC competed in all three seasons from 1901 to 1903 in the Tagblatt Pokal, which was a forerunner of the Austrian football championship.

== Leading goalscorers ==
- (Austria) Johann Studnicka – Austrian League leading goalscorer in 1913 with 13 goals.
- (Austria) Johann Neumann – Austrian League leading goalscorer in 1913 with 13 goals and 1914 with 25 goals.
- (Austria) Leopold Deutsch – Austrian League leading goalscorer in 1915 with 12 goals.
- (Austria) Friedrich "Fritz" Cejka – Austrian League leading goalscorer in 1960 with 28 goals.
- Hans Pirkner – Austrian League leading goalscorer in 1976 with 28 goals in the joint team with FK Austria Wien.

== Notable players ==
- (Austria) Dr. Otto Herschmann, saber fencer, Olympic silver; 100-m freestyle in swimming, Olympic silver
- (Austria) Rodolphe Hiden
- (Austria) Ernst Kaltenbrunner
- (Germany) Richard Hanke

== Other sports ==
=== Hockey ===
- Men

19 times national field hockey champions.
15 times national indoor hockey champions.

- Women

16 times national field hockey champions.
7 times national indoor hockey champions.

The club has competed 30 times in the European Hockey Cup, which is more than any other Austrian club. Wiener AC finished third on two occasions in the European Champions League in indoor hockey.

=== Basketball ===
The club won the Austrian Basketball Championship in 1946-47, the first year in which it was held.
