= Rogers Commission Report =

Space Shuttle Challenger disaster report

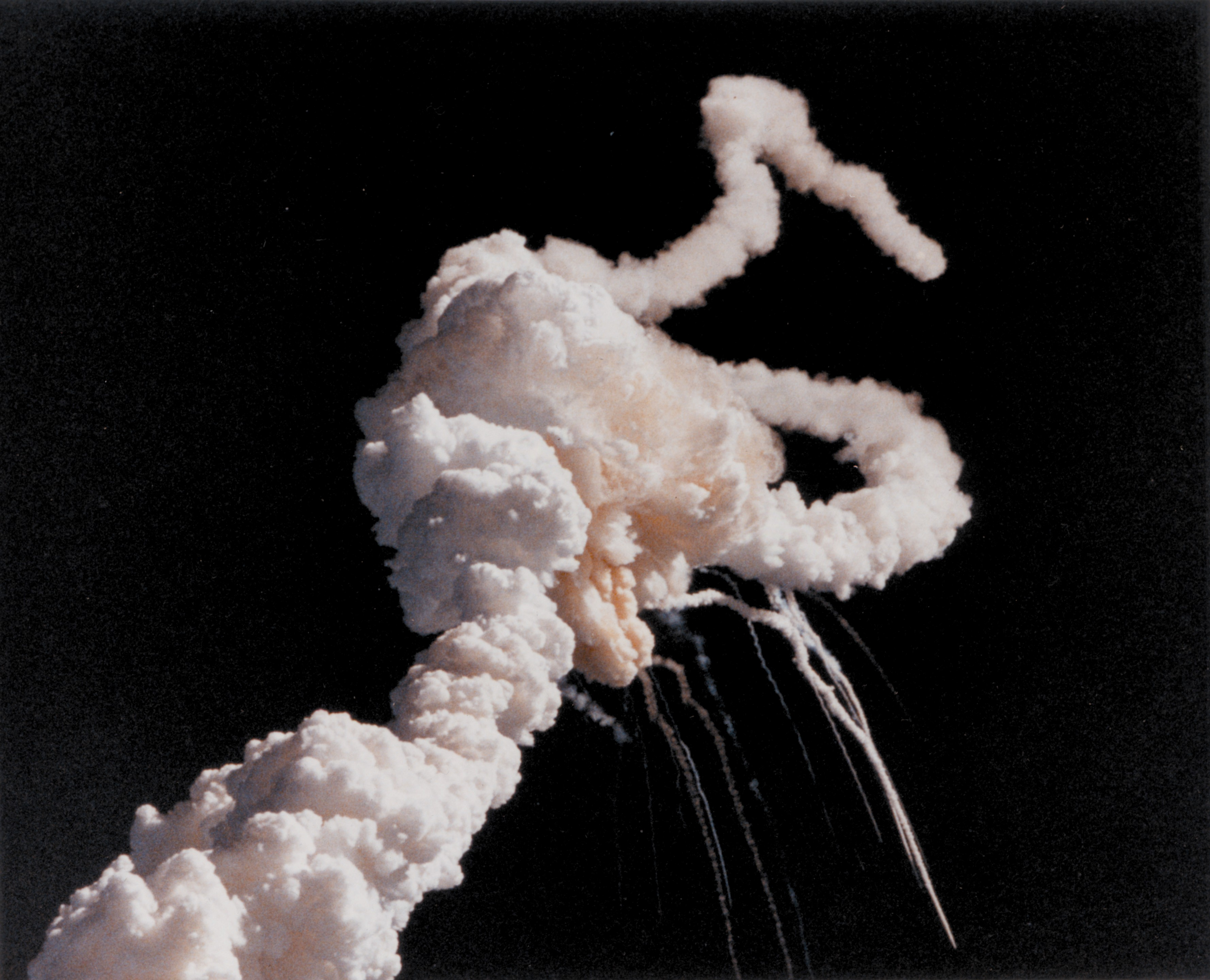
Shuttle-stack destruction that subsequently resulted of the loss of the Space Shuttle Challenger and all seven crewmembers aboard, January 28, 1986.

The Rogers Commission Report was written by a presidential commission charged with investigating the Space Shuttle Challenger disaster during its 10th mission, STS-51-L. The report, released and submitted to President Ronald Reagan on June 9, 1986, determined the cause of the disaster that took place 73 seconds after liftoff, and urged the National Aeronautics and Space Administration (NASA) to improve and install new safety features on the shuttles and in its organizational handling of future missions.

== Findings ==
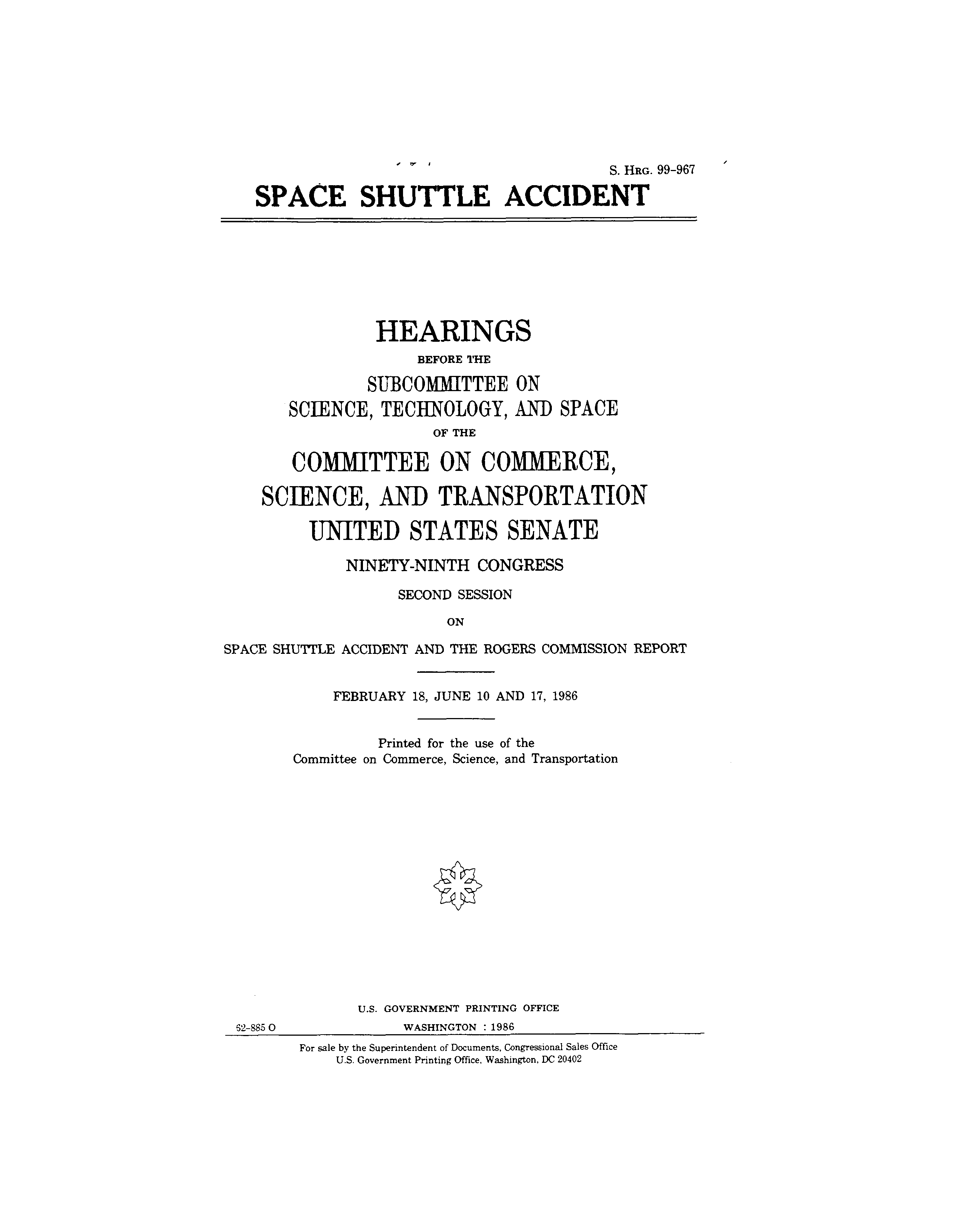
Front page of the Commission Report to Congress

The commission found that the immediate cause of the Challenger accident was a failure in the O-rings sealing the aft field joint on the right solid rocket booster, causing pressurized hot gases and eventually flame to "blow by" the O-ring and contact the adjacent external tank, causing structural failure. The failure of the O-rings was attributed to a design flaw, as their performance could be too easily compromised by factors including the low temperature on the day of launch.

=== "An accident rooted in history" ===
More broadly, the report also determined the contributing causes of the accident. Most salient was the failure of both NASA and its contractor, Morton Thiokol, Inc., to respond adequately to the design flaw. The Commission found that as early as 1977, NASA managers had not only known about the flawed O-ring, but that it had the potential for catastrophe. This led the Rogers Commission to conclude that the Challenger disaster was "an accident rooted in history".

=== Flawed launch decision ===
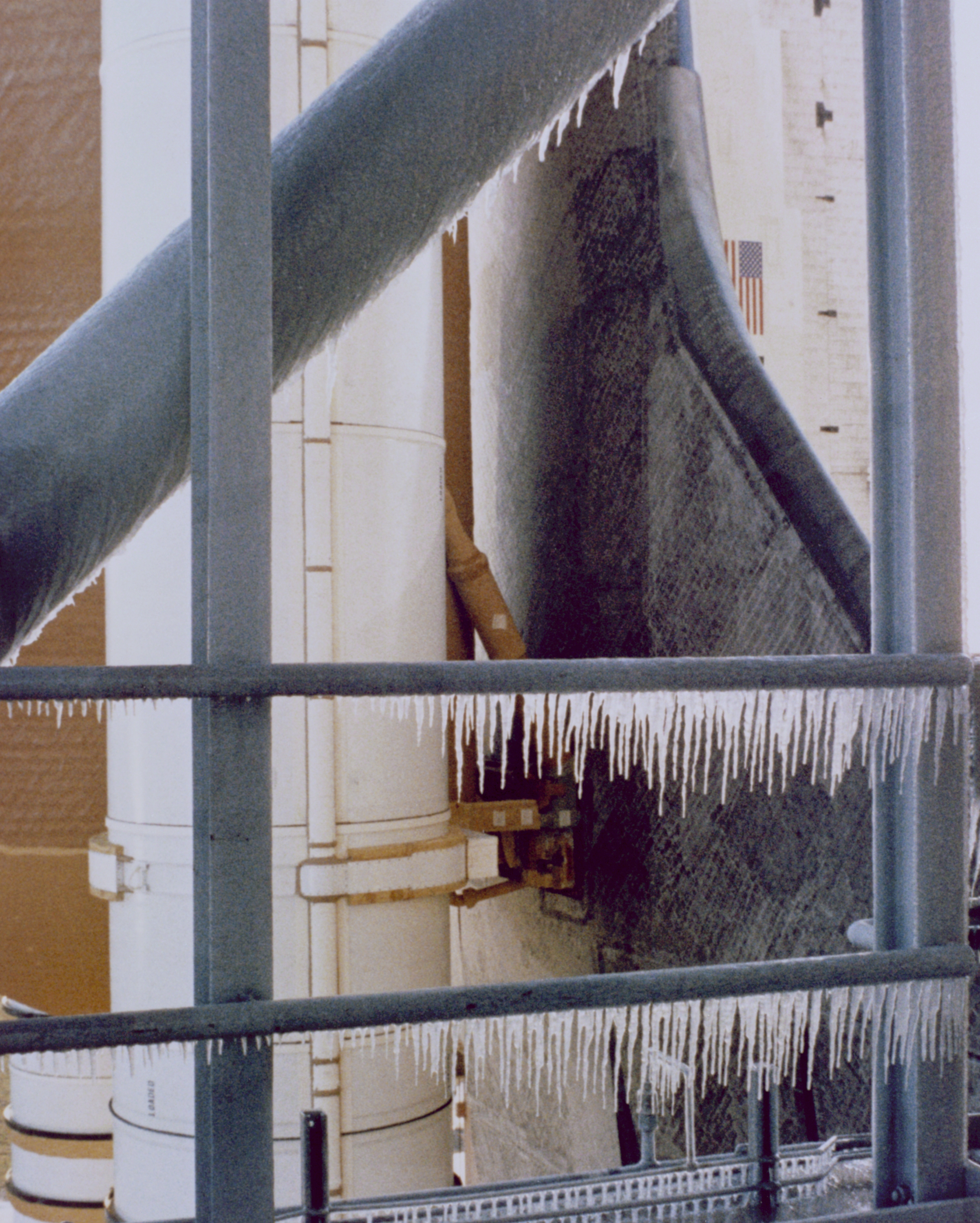
Ice on the launch tower hours before Challenger launch.

The report also strongly criticized the decision-making process that led to the launch of Challenger, saying that it was seriously flawed. Morton Thiokol called a meeting the night before the launch to raise concerns over the forecast temperature in regards to the O-rings. During the meeting, Morton Thiokol's engineers issued a recommendation "not to launch below 53°F", the previous lowest temperature of a launch, STS-51-C, a year earlier. The NASA managers challenged this and after a 30-minute offline caucus, Morton Thiokol's senior management overruled their engineers' decision and gave the launch the go-ahead. The concerns were not communicated beyond the Level III Flight Readiness Review (FRR). It is certain that even though members of higher FRR teams knew about the issues, there were plenty of members who could have stopped the launch but decided not to. This was done in large part because of the management structure at NASA and the lack of major checks and balances, which proved to be fatal in this scenario. The report concluded that:

... failures in communication ... resulted in a decision to launch 51-L based on incomplete and sometimes misleading information, a conflict between engineering data and management judgments, and a NASA management structure that permitted internal flight safety problems to bypass key Shuttle managers.

=== Role of Richard Feynman ===
I took this stuff that I got out of your seal and I put it in ice water, and I discovered that when you put some pressure on it for a while and then undo it, it maintains, it doesn't stretch back. It stays the same dimension. In other words, for a few seconds at least and more seconds than that, there's no resilience in this particular material when it's at a temperature of 32 degrees [Fahrenheit]. I believe that has some significance to our problem.

— Richard Feynman,

One of the commission's best-known members was physicist Richard Feynman. His style of investigating with his direct methods, rather than following the commission schedule, put him at odds with Rogers, who commented, "Feynman is becoming a real pain." During a televised hearing, Feynman demonstrated how the O-rings became less resilient and subject to seal failures at low temperatures by compressing a sample of the material in a clamp and immersing it in a glass of ice water. Feynman's investigation revealed a disconnect between NASA's engineers and executives that was more striking than he expected. His interviews of NASA's high-ranking managers revealed startling misunderstandings of elementary concepts. One was the determination of a safety factor.

In one example, early tests resulted in some of the booster rocket's O-rings burning a third of the way through. These O-rings provided the gas-tight seal needed between the vertically stacked cylindrical sections that made up the solid fuel booster. NASA managers recorded this as demonstrating that the O-rings had a "safety factor" of 3. Feynman incredulously explains the magnitude of this error: A "safety factor" refers to the practice of building an object to be capable of withstanding more force than the force to which it will conceivably be subjected. To paraphrase Feynman's example, if engineers built a bridge that could bear 3,000 pounds without any damage, even though it was never expected to bear more than 1,000 pounds in practice, the safety factor would be 3. If a 1,000-pound truck drove across the bridge and a crack appeared in a beam, even just a third of the way through a beam, the safety factor is now zero: The bridge is defective, there was no safety factor at all, even though the bridge did not actually collapse.

1987 VHS recording scan of the finalized Space Shuttle Challenger Accident Presidential Commission report findings.

Feynman was disturbed that NASA management not only misunderstood, but inverted it by using a term denoting an extra level of safety to describe a part that was actually defective and unsafe. Feynman investigated lack of communication between NASA's management and its engineers, and was struck by management's claim that the risk of catastrophic malfunction on the shuttle was 1 in 10^{5}, i.e., 1 in 100,000. Feynman realized that this claim was risible; as he described, this assessment of risk would entail that NASA could expect to launch a shuttle every day for the next 274 years while suffering, on average, only one accident. Feynman discovered that the 1 in 10^{5} figure was stating what they claimed the failure rate ought to be, given that it was a crewed vehicle, and working backward to generate the failure rate of components.

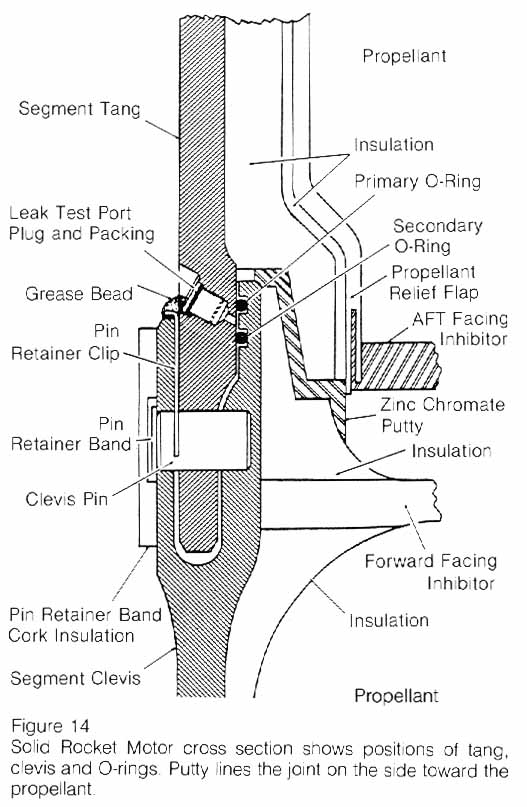
The Space Shuttle solid rocket booster field joint assembly (from the Rogers Commission report)

Feynman was disturbed by two aspects of this practice. First, NASA management assigned a probability of failure to each individual bolt, sometimes claiming a probability of 1 in 10^{8}, i.e., one in one hundred million. Feynman pointed out that it is impossible to calculate such a remote possibility with any rigor. Secondly, Feynman was bothered not just by this sloppy science, but that NASA claimed the risk of catastrophic failure was "necessarily" 1 in 10^{5}. As the very figure was beyond belief, Feynman questioned exactly what "necessarily" meant in this context, whether it meant that the figure followed logically from other calculations or that it reflected NASA management's desire to make the numbers fit.

Feynman suspected that the 1 in 10^{5} figure was fantastical, and made a rough estimate that the true likelihood of shuttle disaster was closer to 1 in 100. He then decided to poll the engineers, asking them to write down an anonymous estimate of the odds of shuttle explosion. Feynman found most estimates fell between 1 in 50 and 1 in 200 (At the time of retirement, the Shuttle suffered two catastrophic failures across 135 flights, a failure rate of 1 in 68.) This showed management had clearly failed to communicate with their engineers. He was upset NASA presented its fantastical figures as fact to convince a member of the public, Christa McAuliffe, to join the crew. Feynman was not uncomfortable with the concept of a 1/100 risk factor, but felt the recruitment of laypeople required an honest portrayal of the true risk involved.

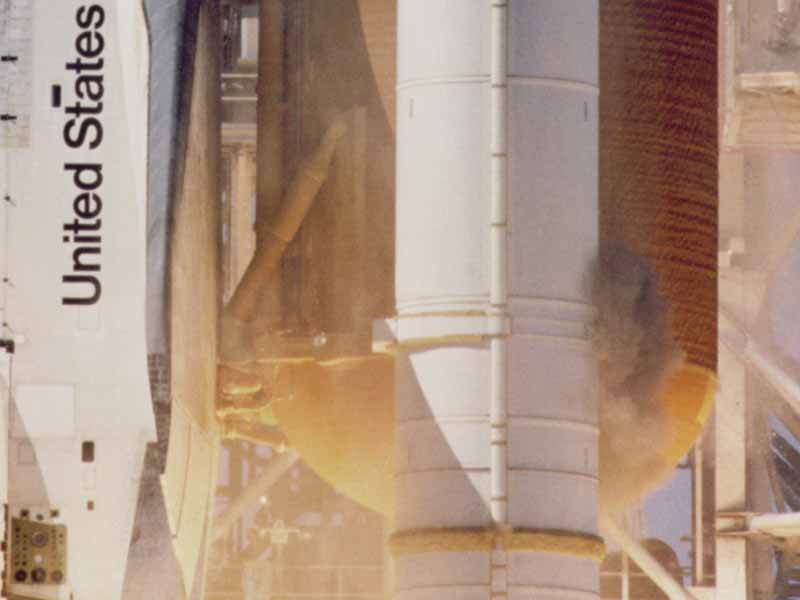
Gray smoke escaping from the right-side solid rocket booster

Feynman's investigation suggested the cause of the Challenger disaster was the part to which NASA management so mistakenly assigned a safety factor. The O-rings were rubber rings designed to form a seal in the shuttle's solid rocket boosters, preventing the rockets' hot gas from escaping and damaging other parts of the vehicle. Feynman suspected that despite NASA's claims, the O-rings were unsuitable at low temperatures and lost their resilience when cold, thus failing to maintain a tight seal when rocket pressure distorted the structure of the solid fuel booster. Feynman's suspicions were corroborated by General Kutyna, who cunningly provided Feynman with a hint by asking about the effect of cold on O-ring seals after mentioning the temperature on the day of the launch was far lower than had been the case with previous launches — below freezing at 28 to 29 °F (−2.2 to −1.7 °C). Previously, the coldest launch had been at 53 °F (12 °C). In 2013, the BBC film The Challenger revealed that the O-ring insight had in fact come to Kutyna from astronaut and fellow commission member Sally Ride, who had secretly provided him with NASA test results showing the O-rings became stiff when they were too cold. Feynman's investigations revealed there had been serious doubts raised about the O-ring seals by engineers at Morton Thiokol, which made the solid fuel boosters, but communication failures had led to their concerns being ignored by NASA management. He found similar failures in procedure in other areas, but singled out NASA software development for praise due to its rigorous and effective quality control procedures — then under threat from management, which wished to reduce testing to save money, given that the tests had always been passed.

Plume on right SRB at T+58.788 seconds. O-Ring sealant failure resulting in visible SRB thrust gas impinging against, penetrating, and then detonating the LH2 reservoir of the ET.

Feynman concluded that deficiencies in NASA management's scientific understanding, lack of communication between the two camps, and gross misrepresentation of the dangers, required NASA take a hiatus from Shuttle launches until it could resolve its internal inconsistencies and present an honest picture of the shuttle's reliability. Feynman found that, while he respected the intellects of his fellow Commission members, they universally finished their criticisms of NASA with affirmations that the Challenger disaster should be addressed by NASA internally, but there was no need for NASA to suspend its operations or receive less funding. Feynman felt the commission's conclusions misrepresented its findings, and he could not in good conscience recommend that such a flawed organization should continue without a suspension of operations and a major overhaul. His fellow commission members were alarmed by Feynman's dissent, and it was only after much petitioning that Feynman's minority report was included at all. Feynman was so critical of flaws in NASA's "safety culture" that he threatened to remove his name from the report unless it included his observations on the reliability of the shuttle, which appeared as Appendix F. In the appendix, he stated:

It appears that there are enormous differences of opinion as to the probability of a failure with loss of vehicle and of human life. The estimates range from roughly 1 in 100 to 1 in 100,000. The higher figures come from the working engineers, and the very low figures from management. What are the causes and consequences of this lack of agreement? Since 1 part in 100,000 would imply that one could put a Shuttle up each day for 300 years expecting to lose only one, we could properly ask "What is the cause of management's fantastic faith in the machinery? ... It would appear that, for whatever purpose, be it for internal or external consumption, the management of NASA exaggerates the reliability of its product, to the point of fantasy.

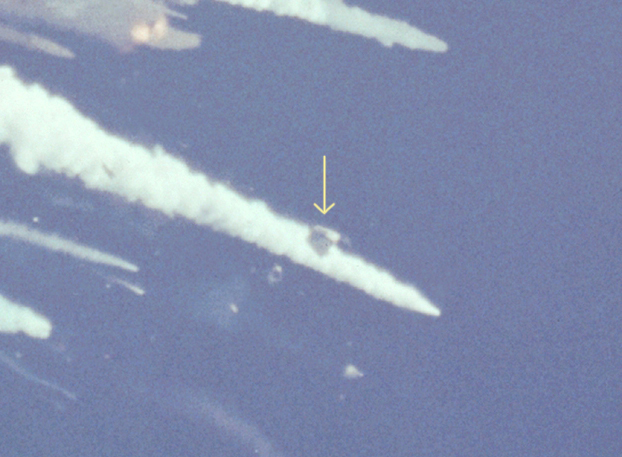
Forward section of the fuselage after breakup, as indicated by arrow.

"For a successful technology," Feynman concluded, "reality must take precedence over public relations, for nature cannot be fooled." Feynman later wrote about the investigation in his 1988 book What Do You Care What Other People Think?. The second half of the book covers the investigation and the issues between science and politics, and includes the appendix he wrote. Feynman reported that, though he had believed he was making discoveries about the problems at NASA on his own, he realized that either NASA or contractor personnel, in an effort to anonymously focus attention on these problem areas, had carefully led him to the evidence which would support the conclusions on which he would later report.

== Results ==
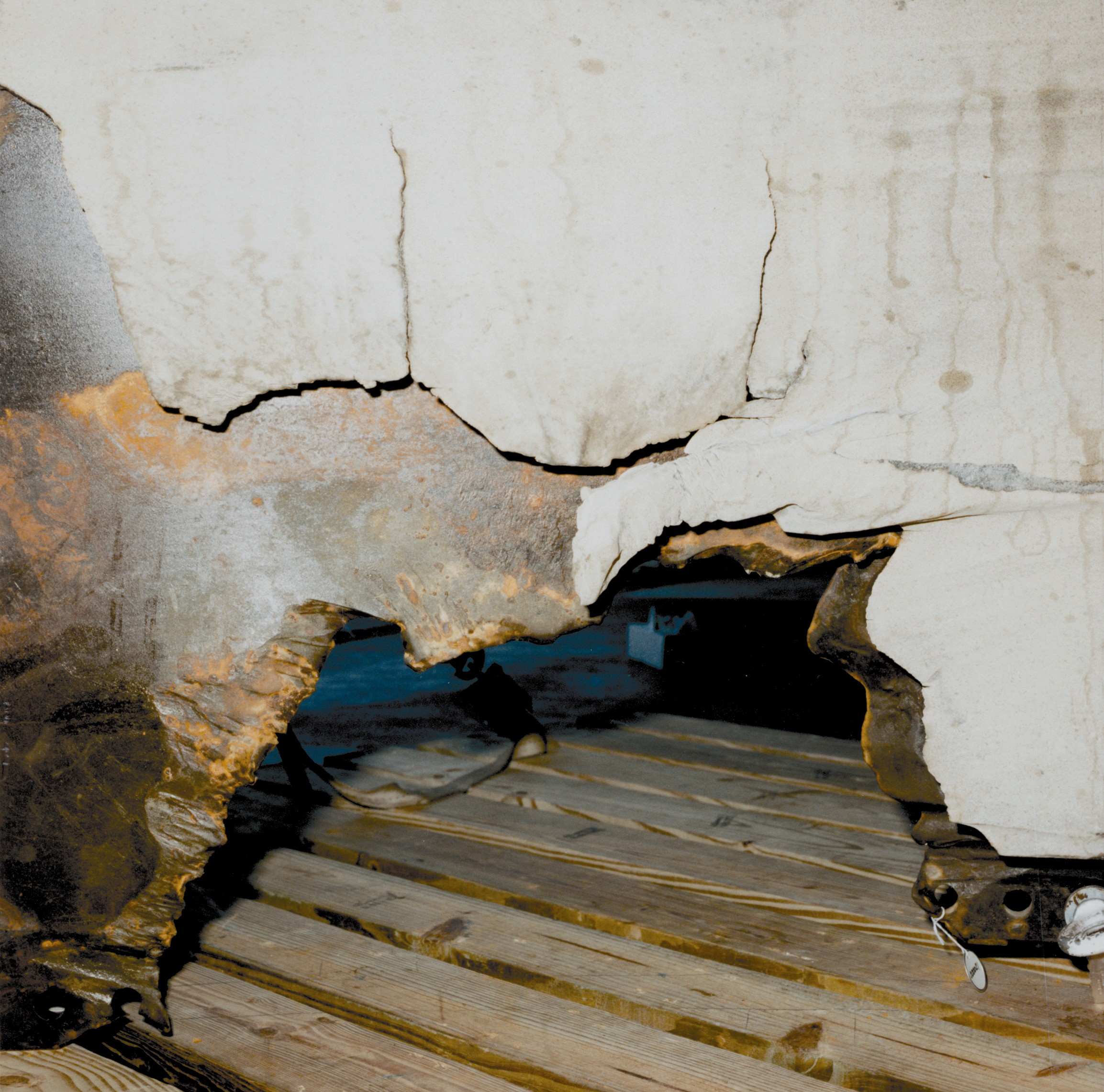
Right SRB debris showing the hole caused by the plume

The Rogers Commission offered nine recommendations on improving safety in the space shuttle program and NASA was directed by President Reagan to report back within thirty days as to how it planned to implement those recommendations. This is a summary of the chapter of Recommendations:

1. Design and Independent Oversight
2. Shuttle Management Structure, Astronauts in Management and Shuttle Safety Panel
3. Criticality Review and Hazard Analysis
4. Safety Organization
5. Improved Communications
6. Landing Safety
7. Launch Abort and Crew Escape
8. Flight Rate
9. Maintenance Safeguards

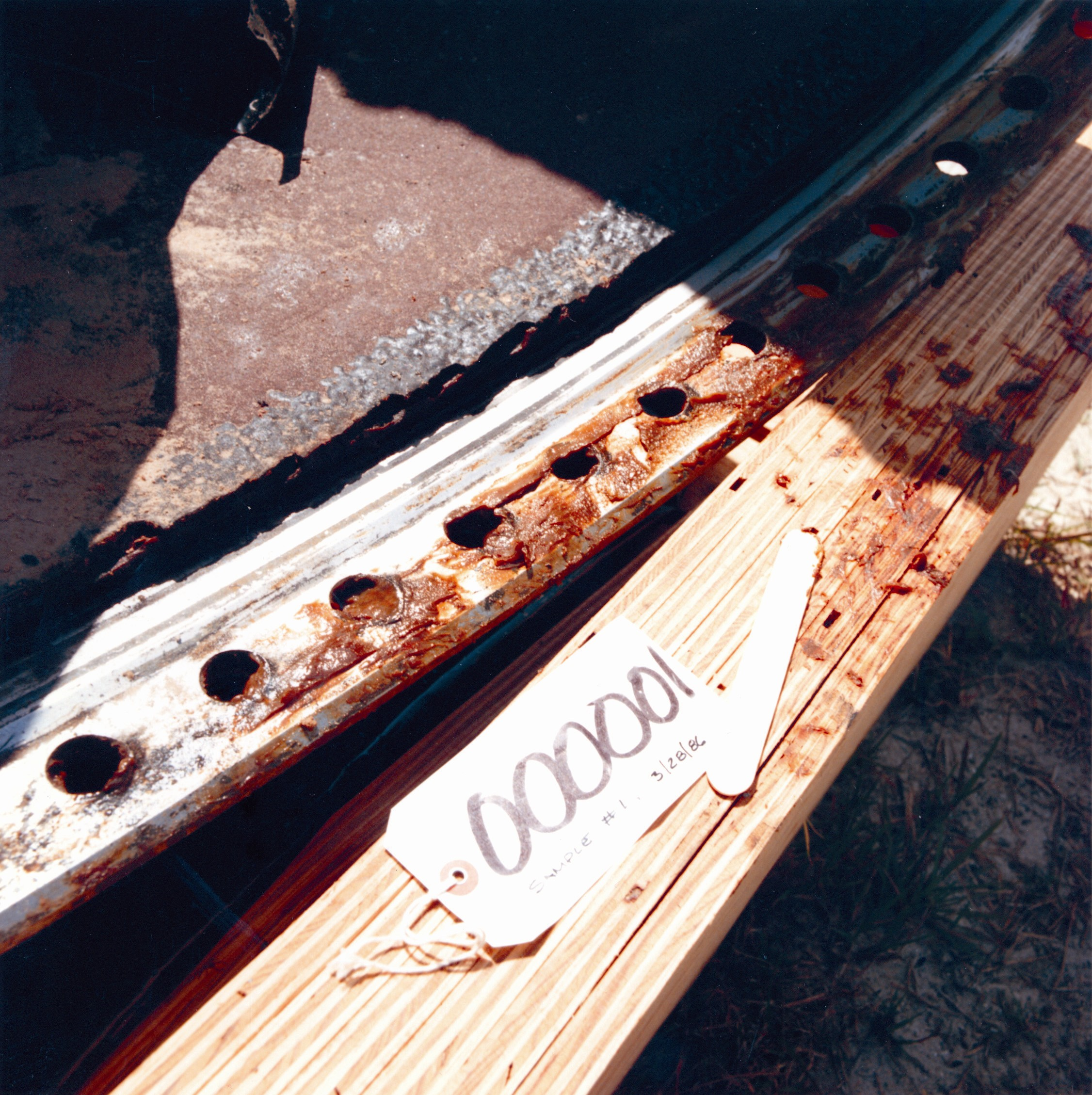
Recovered remains of an SRB, displaying O-Ring tracks.

In response to the commission's recommendation, NASA initiated a total redesign of the space shuttle's solid rocket boosters, which was watched over by an independent oversight group as stipulated by the commission. NASA's contract with Morton Thiokol, the contractor responsible for the solid rocket boosters, included a clause stating that in the event of a failure leading to "loss of life or mission," Thiokol would forfeit $10 million of its incentive fee and formally accept legal liability for the failure. After the Challenger accident, Thiokol agreed to "voluntarily accept" the monetary penalty in exchange for not being forced to accept liability. NASA also created a new Office of Safety, Reliability and Quality Assurance, headed as the commission had specified by a NASA associate administrator who reported directly to the NASA administrator. George Rodney, formerly of Martin Marietta, was appointed to this position. Former Challenger flight director Jay Greene became chief of the Safety Division of the directorate.

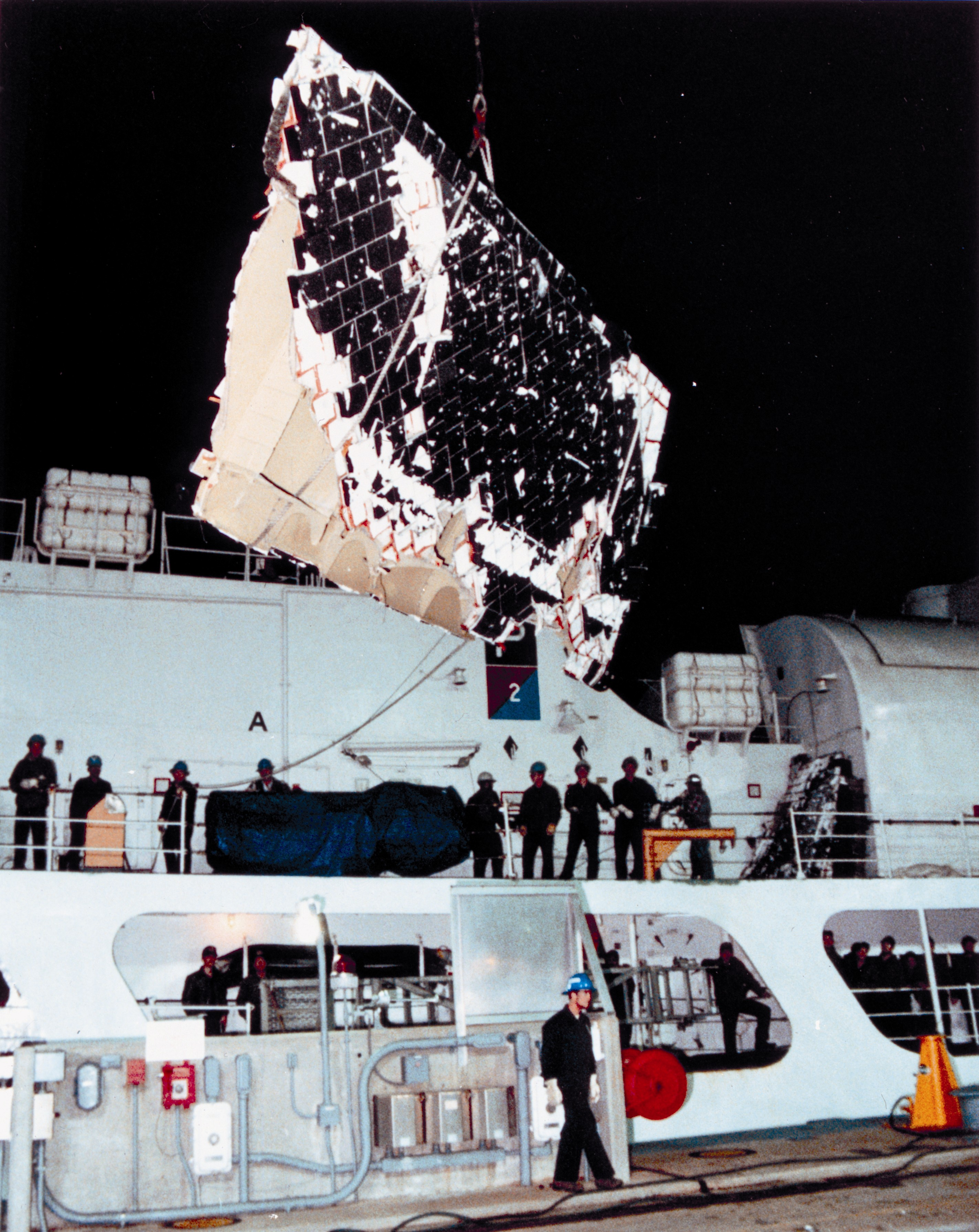
Recovery of Challenger debris from aboard USGS Cutter Dallas.

The unrealistically optimistic launch schedule pursued by NASA had been criticized by the Rogers Commission as a possible contributing cause to the accident. After the accident, NASA attempted to aim at a more realistic shuttle flight rate: it added another orbiter, Endeavour, to the space shuttle fleet to replace Challenger, and it worked with the Department of Defense to put more satellites in orbit using expendable launch vehicles, rather than the shuttle. In August 1986, President Reagan also announced that the shuttle would no longer carry commercial satellite payloads. After a 32-month hiatus, the next shuttle mission, STS-26, was launched on September 29, 1988.

After the Space Shuttle Columbia disaster in 2003, attention once again focused on the attitude of NASA management towards safety issues. The Columbia Accident Investigation Board (CAIB) concluded that NASA had failed to learn many of the lessons of Challenger. In particular, the agency had not set up a truly independent office for safety oversight; the CAIB felt that in this area, "NASA's response to the Rogers Commission did not meet the Commission's intent". The CAIB believed that "the causes of the institutional failure responsible for Challenger have not been fixed," saying that the same "flawed decision-making process" that had resulted in the Challenger accident was responsible for Columbia's destruction seventeen years later.

== Commission members ==
- William P. Rogers, chairman and former United States secretary of state (under Richard Nixon) and United States attorney general (under Dwight D. Eisenhower)
- Neil Armstrong (vice-chairman), retired astronaut and first person to walk on the Moon (Apollo 11)
- David Campion Acheson, diplomat and son of former secretary of state Dean Acheson
- Eugene E. Covert, aeronautics expert and former chief scientist of the United States Air Force
- Richard P. Feynman, theoretical physicist and winner of the 1965 Nobel Prize in Physics
- Robert B. Hotz, editor, Aviation Week and Space Technology
- Donald J. Kutyna, Air Force general with experience in ICBMs and shuttle management
- Sally K. Ride, engineer, astrophysicist and first female American astronaut in space, flew on Challenger as part of missions STS-7 and STS-41-G. Later, she served on the Columbia Accident Investigation Board in the Columbia disaster
- Robert W. Rummel, Trans World Airlines executive and aviation consultant to NASA
- Joseph F. Sutter, Boeing senior vice president and engineering program director on the Boeing 747 aircraft
- Arthur B. C. Walker Jr., solar physicist and Stanford University professor
- Albert D. Wheelon, physicist and developer of Central Intelligence Agency's aerial surveillance program
- Charles E. "Chuck" Yeager, retired Air Force general and the first person to break the sound barrier in level flight
- Alton G. Keel Jr., executive director of the commission

== Commission witnesses ==
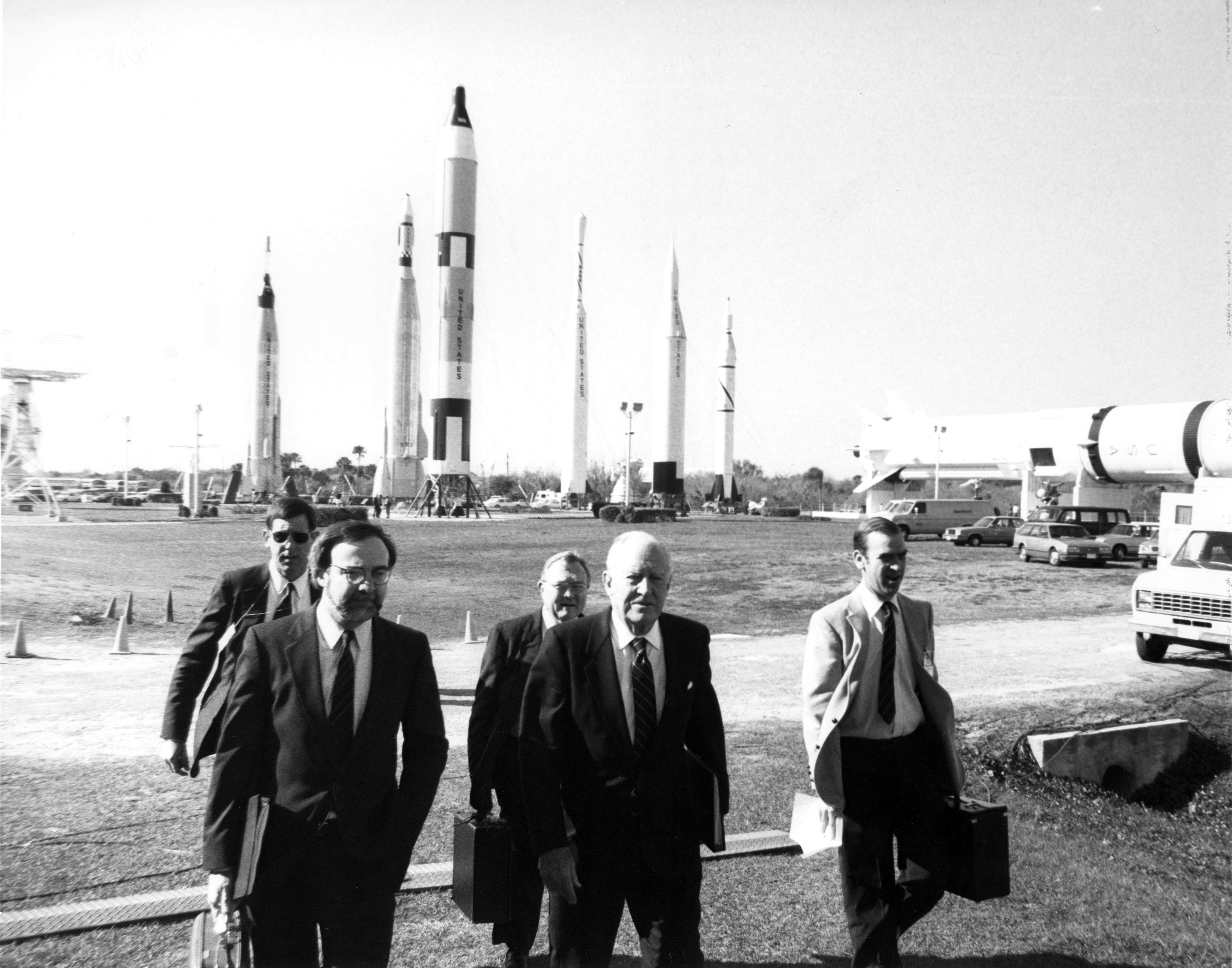
Members of the Rogers Commission arrive at Kennedy Space Center.

Day 1, February 6, 1986

- Dr. William R. Graham, Acting Administrator, NASA
- Jesse W. Moore, Associate Administrator for space flight, NASA, and chairman, 51L Data Design and Analysis Test Task Force
- Arnold D. Aldrich, Manager, National space transportation systems program, Johnson Space Center
- Dr. Judson A. Lovingood, Deputy Manager, Shuttle Projects office, Marshall Space Flight Center
- Robert Sieck, Director of Shuttle operations, Kennedy Space Center
- Richard G. Smith, Director, Kennedy Space Center
- Thomas L. Moser, Director, Engineering, Johnson Space Center
- Richard H. Kohrs, Deputy Manager, National Space transportation systems program, Johnson Space Center

Day 2, February 7, 1986

- Marv Jones
- Stanley Klein, Federal Bureau of Investigation
- Jesse W. Moore, Associate Administrator for space flight, NASA, and chairman, 51L Data Design and Analysis Test Task Force
- Arnold Aldrich, Manager, National Space Transportation Systems Program, Johnson Space Center

Day 3, February 10, 1986

- Mr L. Michael Weeks, Deputy Associate Administrator for Space Flight, NASA
- Irvin Davids, Shuttle propulsion Division
- Lawrence B. Mulloy, Project Manager, Solid Rocket Boosters, Marshall Space Flight Center

Day 4, February 11, 1986

- Dr. William R. Graham, Acting Administrator of NASA
- Jesse W. Moore, Associate Administrator for space Flight, NASA
- Lawrence B. Mulloy, Project Manager, Solid Rocket Boosters, Marshall Space Flight Center, NASA
- Richard C. Cook
- Michael B. Mann, Chief, STS Resources Analysis Branch, Office of The Comptroller, NASA
- Mr. David Winterhalter, acting director, Shuttle Propulsion Group, NASA

Day 5, February 13, 1986

- Dick Kohrs, Deputy Manager, NST Program office, Johnson Space Center
- Charlie Stevenson, Photographic Team Analysis, Kennedy Space Center
- William R. Lucas
- Jesse W. Moore
- Milton Silveira
- Horace Lamberth
- Jim Harrington
- T. Jack Lee, deputy director, Marshall Space Flight Center, and Head, Marshall Contingency Investigative Team
- Mr. George Hardy
- Rick Bachtol
- T. Moser, Head, Failure Scenario Team, Johnson Space Center

Day 6, February 14, 1986

- Larry Mulloy
- Jerry E. Mason, Senior Vice President, Wasatch Operations, Morton Thiokol, Inc.
- Robert Lund, Morton Thiokol, Inc.
- Roger Boisjoly, Structures Section, Morton Thiokol, Inc.
- Arnold Thompson, Design Engineer, Morton Thiokol, Inc.
- Allan J. McDonald, Morton Thiokol, Inc.

Day 7, February 25, 1986

- Allan J. McDonald, Manager, SRM Project, Morton Thiokol, Inc.
- Jerry E. Mason, Senior Vice President, Wasatch Division, Morton Thiokol, Inc.
- Roger Boisjoly, Seal Task Force, Morton Thiokol, Inc.
- Arnie Thompson, Supervisor, Structures, Morton Thiokol, Inc.
- Robert Lund, Vice President, Engineering, Morton Thiokol, Inc.
- Joe Kilminster, Vice President, Shuttle Project, Huntsville
- Brian G. Russell

Day 8, February 26, 1986

- Larry Mulloy, Manager, Space Shuttle Solid Rocket Booster Program, Marshall Space Flight Center
- George C. Hardy, deputy director, Science and Engineering, Marshall Space Flight Center
- Stanley Reinarz, Manager, Marshall Shuttle projects Office
- Dr. Judson A. Lovingood, Deputy Manager, Marshall Shuttle Projects Office
- Charles Stevenson, Ice Team member
- B. K. Davis, Ice Team member
- Lieutenant Colonel Edward F. Kolczynski, Commander, Detachment 11, 2d Weather Squadron, Patrick Air Force Base

Day 9, February 27, 1986

- Charles Stevenson
- B. K. Davis
- Lieutenant Colonel Edward F. Kolczynski
- Rocco Petrone, President, Space Transportation Systems Division, North American Space Operations, Rockwell International
- Al Martin, Site Director, Launch Support Operations, Kennedy Space Center, Rockwell International
- Bob Glaysher, Vice President and Program Manager, Orbiter Operations Support, Rockwell International
- Martin Cioffoletti, Vice President, Space Transportation Systems Integration, Rockwell International
- Arnie Aldrich, Manager, National Space Transportation Systems, Johnson Space Center
- William R. Lucas, Director, Marshall Space Flight Center, Huntsville, Alabama
- Jesse W. Moore, Associate Administrator for Space Flight, National Aeronautics and Space Administration Headquarters
- Richard G. Smith, Director, Kennedy Space Center
- Gene Thomas, Director, Launch and Landing Operations, Kennedy Space Center
- Ben Powers, Engineer, Structures and Propulsion Laboratory, Marshall Space Flight Center

Day 10, March 7, 1986

- Colonel Edward O'Connor Jr., USAF, Director of Operations, 6655TH ASTG, ESMC
- Robert Lang, Shuttle Operations, Mechanical Systems Division, Kennedy Space Center
- Carver Kennedy, Director, VAB Operations, Morton-Thiokol, Inc.
- Bill Barsh, Engineering Manager, External Tank/Solid Rocket Booster Operations, Lockheed Space Operations Company, KSC
- Thomas L. Moser, Deputy Associate Administrator for Space Flight, NASA
- Dr. J. Wayne Littles, associate director for Engineering, Marshall Space Flight Center
- T. Jack Lee, deputy director, MSFC
- Gary Coultas, Assistant Manager, Orbiter Projects, Johnson Space Center
- George Hopson, Director, Systems Analysis and Integration Laboratory, Marshall Space Flight Center

Day 11, March 21, 1986

- James R. Thompson Jr., Vice Chairman, STS-51L, Data and Design and Analyst Task force, Cape Canaveral, Florida
- Col. Edward O'Connor Jr., chairman, Search, Recovery and Reconstruction, Cape Canaveral, Florida
- Dan M. Germany, chairman, photo and television support team, Cape Canaveral, and Deputy Manager, Space Station Project Office, Johnson Flight Space Center, Houston, Texas
- Charles Stevenson
- George McDonough
- John Erickson
- J. Wayne Littles, associate director for Engineering, Marshall Space Flight Center
- Harold N. Scofield, Chief, Control Systems Division, Marshall Space Flight Center
- Robert S. Ryan, Chief, Structural Dynamics Division Systems Dynamics Laboratory, Marshall Space Flight Center
- Garry M. Lyles, Propulsion Analysis Branch, Structures and Propulsion Laboratory, Marshall Space Flight Center
- Fredrick D. Bachtel, Thermal Engineering Branch, Structures and Propulsion Laboratory, Marshall Space Flight Center

Day 12, April 3, 1986

- George Abbey, Director of Flight Crew Operations
- John Young, Chief, Astronaut Office
- Paul J. Weitz, Deputy Chief, Astronaut Office
- Bob Crippen, astronaut
- Hank Hartsfield, astronaut
- Rear Admiral Richard H. Truly, Associate Administrator for space flight
- Arnold D. Aldrich, manager of the space transportation systems
- Clifford E. Charlesworth, director of space operations

Day 13, May 3, 1986

- Lawrence B. Mulloy, Manager, Solid Rocket Booster Project Office
- Lawrence O. Wear, Manager, Solid Rocket Motor Project, Marshall Space Flight Center
- Brian G. Russell, Program Manager, Department of solid rocket motor and Final Assembly
- Robert Ebeling, Department of solid rocket motor igniter and Final Assembly
- J.C. Kilminster, Vice President, Space Booster Programs
- Roger Boisjoly, Seal Task Force, Morton-Thiokol, Inc.
- George B. Hardy, deputy director, Science and Engineering, former Manager, Solid Rocket Booster office
- James E. Kingsbury, Science and Engineering
- Robert G. Eudy, former Chief Engineer, Solid Rocket Motor, Office of Associate Director For Engineering
- John O. Miller, Technical Assistant to Solid Rocket Motor Manager
- William L. Ray, Solid Rocket Motor Branch, Propulsion Division, Engineering Directorate
- L. Michael Weeks, Associate Administrator, (technical) for space flight, NASA
- Glynn Lunney|Glynn S. Lunney, former Manager, National Space Transportation Systems Program Office
- John R. Stocker, Assistant General counsel, corporate offices, Rockwell International, corporation

== See also ==
- Columbia Accident Investigation Board —NASA Internal commission re 2003 Shuttle Columbia loss
- Apollo 1 — Planned United States spaceflight destroyed by accidental fire (1967)
