= 1968–69 SK Rapid Wien season =

Rapid Wien
1968–69 season
- Coaches: Rudolf Vytlacil, Karl Decker, Robert Körner
- Stadium: Pfarrwiese, Vienna, Austria
- Nationalliga: 3rd
- Cup: Winner (7th title)
- European Cup: Quarterfinals
- Top goalscorer: League: Johnny Bjerregaard (20); All: Johnny Bjerregaard (26)
- Average home league attendance: 8,700

The 1968–69 SK Rapid Wien season was the 71st season in club history.

== Squad ==
=== Squad statistics ===
Nat.	Name	Age	League		Cup		European Cup		Total	
Nat.	Name	Age	Apps	Goals	Apps	Goals	Apps	Goals	Apps	Goals
Goalkeepers
(Austria)	Gerald Fuchsbichler	24	24		5		6		35	
(Austria)	Josef Reisinger	19	4		0+1				4+1	
Defenders
(Austria)	Hans Eigenstiller	25	13+1		4				17+1	
(Austria)	Erich Fak	23	26		5		6		37	
(Austria)	Roland Gareis	20			0+1				0+1	
(Austria)	Walter Gebhardt	22	21		3		6		30	
(Austria)	Walter Glechner	29	24		3		6		33	
(Austria)	Stefan Vasgyura	18	5+2	2	1				6+2	2
Midfielders
(Sweden)	Sven Lindman	26	14	1	3+1	2	2+1	2	19+2	5
(Austria)	Alfred Traxler	20	3+5		1				4+5	
(Austria)	Ewald Ullmann	25	21	2	4+1		3		28+1	2
Forwards
(Denmark)	Johnny Bjerregaard	25	26	20	5	4	6	2	37	26
(Austria)	Rudolf Flögel	28	17+1	8	4	1	5		26+1	9
(Austria)	Toni Fritsch	22	20+4	1	4		6		30+4	1
(Austria)	Leopold Grausam	25	23+1	12	4+1	1	6	1	33+2	14
(Austria)	Günter Kaltenbrunner	24	25	13	4	2	5+1	3	34+1	18
(Austria)	Walter Skocik	27	25	2	4	1	3		32	3
(Denmark)	Tom Søndergaard	24	16	1	1	1	6		23	2
(Austria)	Michael Zimmermann	24	1						1	

== Fixtures and results ==
Win Draw Loss

=== League ===
Rd	Date	Venue	Opponent	Res.	Att.	Goals and discipline
1	17.08.1968	A	Austria Salzburg	1-1	12,000	Bjerregaard 82'
2	25.08.1968	H	SW Bregenz	4-1	9,200	Bjerregaard 26', Grausam 30', Wirth 63' (o.g.), Ullmann 77'
3	31.08.1968	A	GAK	2-1	9,000	Fritsch 49', Bjerregaard 80'
4	07.09.1968	A	Admira	5-1	20,000	Bjerregaard 11', Kaltenbrunner G. 40', Flögel 67', Grausam 76' 85'
5	14.09.1968	H	Wacker Innsbruck	2-0	12,000	Grausam 6', Kaltenbrunner G. 52'
7	05.10.1968	H	Wiener SC	0-3	5,000	
8	19.10.1968	A	LASK	1-1	18,000	Bjerregaard 75'
9	26.10.1968	H	Austria Klagenfurt	6-0	7,000	Skocik, Kaltenbrunner G., Bjerregaard
10	02.11.1968	A	Leoben	3-2	5,000	Flögel 61' 84', Grausam 67'
11	16.11.1968	H	Sturm Graz	5-2	10,000	Bjerregaard 7' 14' (pen.), Flögel 41', Grausam 55', Søndergaard 73'
12	24.11.1968	A	Wattens	5-0	6,000	Kaltenbrunner G. 4' 40', Vasgyura 72' 88', Bjerregaard 89'
13	30.11.1968	H	Eisenstadt	2-1	7,000	Kaltenbrunner G. 17', Bjerregaard 65'
14	08.12.1968	A	Wacker Wien	4-0	12,500	Kaltenbrunner G. 40' (pen.), Ullmann 55', Flögel 63', Bjerregaard 78'
15	15.12.1968	H	Austria Wien	3-4	28,000	Flögel 36', Bjerregaard 78', Kaltenbrunner G. 88' (pen.)
16	02.03.1969	H	Austria Salzburg	2-0	7,500	Flögel 48' (pen.), Grausam 62'
17	10.03.1969	A	SW Bregenz	0-1	9,000	
18	15.03.1969	H	GAK	4-1	2,400	Grausam 54', Bjerregaard 60' (pen.), Skocik 69', Flögel 88'
19	22.03.1969	A	Wacker Innsbruck	0-1	12,000	
20	20.05.1969	H	Admira	1-1	6,500	Grausam 54'
22	12.04.1969	A	Wiener SC	2-2	22,000	Kaltenbrunner G. 34', Lindman 87'
23	01.05.1969	H	LASK	1-0	6,500	Kaltenbrunner G. 15'
24	04.05.1969	A	Austria Klagenfurt	2-3	6,000	Kaltenbrunner G. 8', Bjerregaard 74'
25	17.05.1969	H	Leoben	5-0	8,000	Grausam 4' 15' 86', Bjerregaard 46', Zahn 60' (o.g.)
26	23.05.1969	A	Sturm Graz	1-2	5,000	Kaltenbrunner G. 63' (pen.)
27	31.05.1969	H	Wattens	0-2	8,000	
28	11.06.1969	A	Eisenstadt	2-2	6,500	Bjerregaard 38', Kaltenbrunner G. 48'
29	14.06.1969	H	Wacker Wien	1-0	4,500	Bjerregaard 50'
30	20.06.1969	A	Austria Wien	0-2	7,000	

=== Cup ===
Rd	Date	Venue	Opponent	Res.	Att.	Goals and discipline
R1	10.08.1968	A	Leoben	3-0	6,500	Bjerregaard 14' 18', Kaltenbrunner G. 82' (pen.)
R16	19.03.1969	H	VÖEST Linz	3-0	2,000	Søndergaard 39', Flögel 72', Skocik 84'
QF	26.03.1969	H	Wacker Innsbruck	3-0	4,000	Kaltenbrunner G. 3', Lindman 18' 53'
SF	14.05.1969	H	Austria Wien	1-0	16,000	Grausam 58'
F	03.06.1969	N	Wiener SC	2-1	14,000	Bjerregaard 52' 85'

=== European Cup ===
Rd	Date	Venue	Opponent	Res.	Att.	Goals and discipline
R1-L1	18.09.1968	A	Rosenborg (Norway)	3-1	25,000	Bjerregaard 27', Kaltenbrunner G. 65', Grausam 87'
R1-L2	02.10.1968	H	Rosenborg (Norway)	3-3	1,575	Lindman 12' 80', Kaltenbrunner G. 17'
R2-L1	20.11.1968	H	Real Madrid (Spain)	1-0	45,000	Kaltenbrunner G. 55'
R2-L2	04.12.1968	A	Real Madrid (Spain)	1-2	80,000	Bjerregaard 50'
QF-L1	26.02.1969	A	Manchester United (England)	0-3	62,000	
QF-L2	05.03.1969	H	Manchester United (England)	0-0	52,000	
