= William R. Lucas =

American spaceflight administrator (1922–2025)

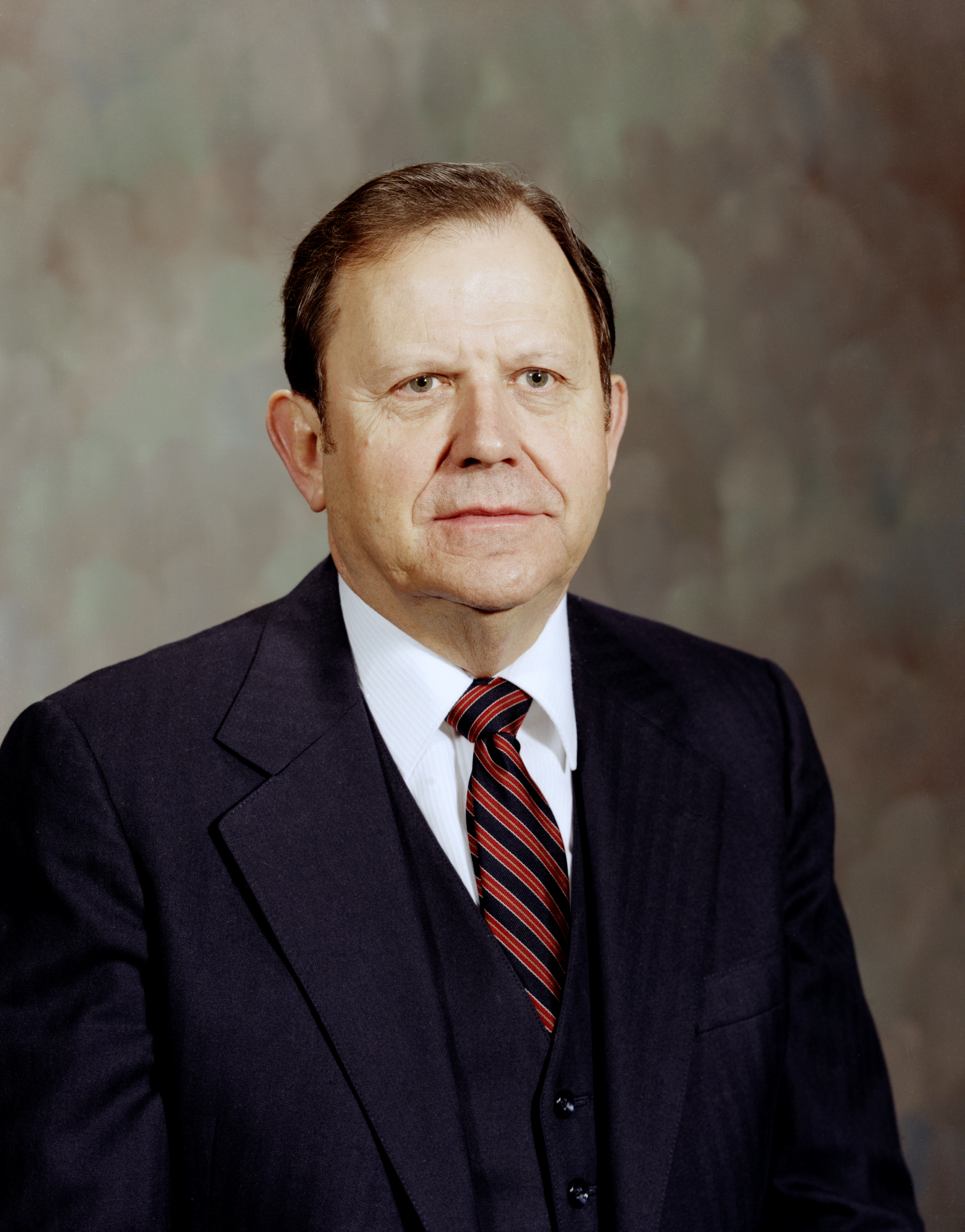
- Official NASA portrait of Dr. William R. Lucas
- Born: William Ray Lucas; March 1, 1922; Newbern, Tennessee, U.S.
- Died: February 10, 2025 (aged 102); Huntsville, Alabama, U.S.
- Education: Memphis State College; Vanderbilt University
- Occupation: NASA administrator
- Title: Director of the Marshall Space Flight Center

William Ray Lucas (March 1, 1922 – February 10, 2025) was the fourth Director of the NASA Marshall Space Flight Center. He served as director from June 15, 1974, to July 3, 1986.

== Early career ==
William Ray Lucas was born in Newbern, Tennessee, on March 1, 1922. He graduated from Memphis State College (now the University of Memphis) in 1943 with a degree in chemistry. He earned a master's degree and a doctorate in metallurgy from Vanderbilt University in Nashville. He briefly interrupted his education to serve in the United States Navy during World War II.

In 1952, Lucas moved to Huntsville, Alabama, to join Wernher von Braun's team at the Army Ballistic Missile Agency, based at the Redstone Arsenal. After serving as a staffer with the Guided Missile Development Group, he became the agency's materials officer in 1956. In this position, Lucas designed the thermal control system for the United States' first space satellite, Explorer 1. He also selected the materials used in the rocket that made Alan Shepard the first American in space, in 1961.

When von Braun's team was transferred to NASA as part of the Marshall Space Flight Center in 1960, Lucas transferred to the new organization. He served in Marshall's Propulsion and Vehicle Engineering Laboratory, eventually becoming its director. While there, he developed the propulsion system for the Saturn V rocket. He also developed the world's second space station, Skylab.

== Director of Marshall ==
After three years as Marshall's deputy director, Lucas was named the center's director in 1974. He took over only two years after the start of the Space Shuttle program. Under his direction, Marshall was responsible for managing the Shuttle's propulsion system, including the solid rocket boosters (SRBs) and the main engines on the Orbiter.

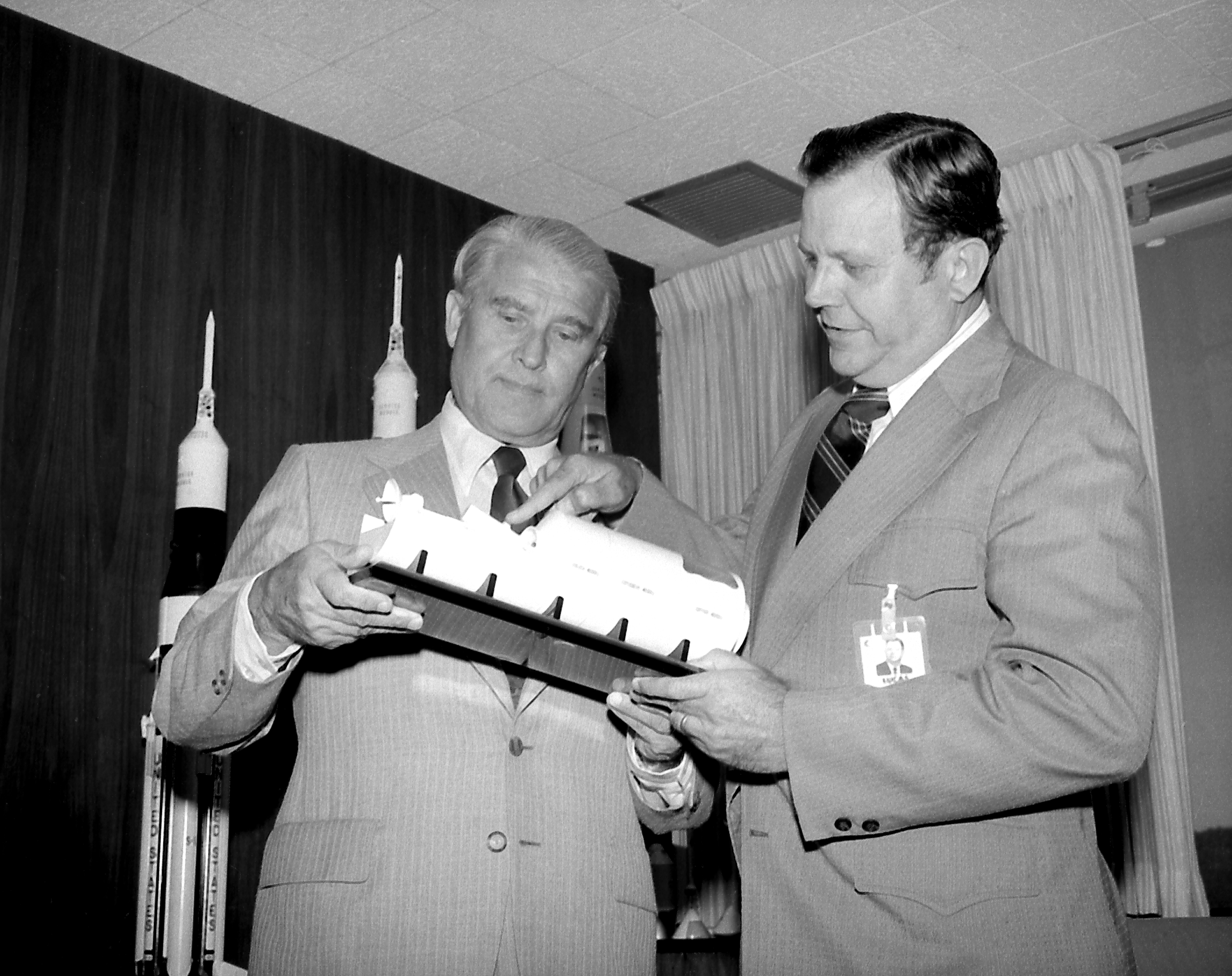
Dr. Wernher von Braun, a former Marshall Space Flight Center Director, and Lucas, a newly appointed MSFC Director, viewing a Space Shuttle model, October 11, 1974.

As director, Lucas soon became known as a harsh taskmaster. Unlike most high-ranking NASA officials, he frequently dressed down his subordinates in public. He also barred employees from jogging during lunch breaks, under penalty of losing time from annual leave. Lucas also had a reputation for dealing only in terms of hard, quantifiable data.

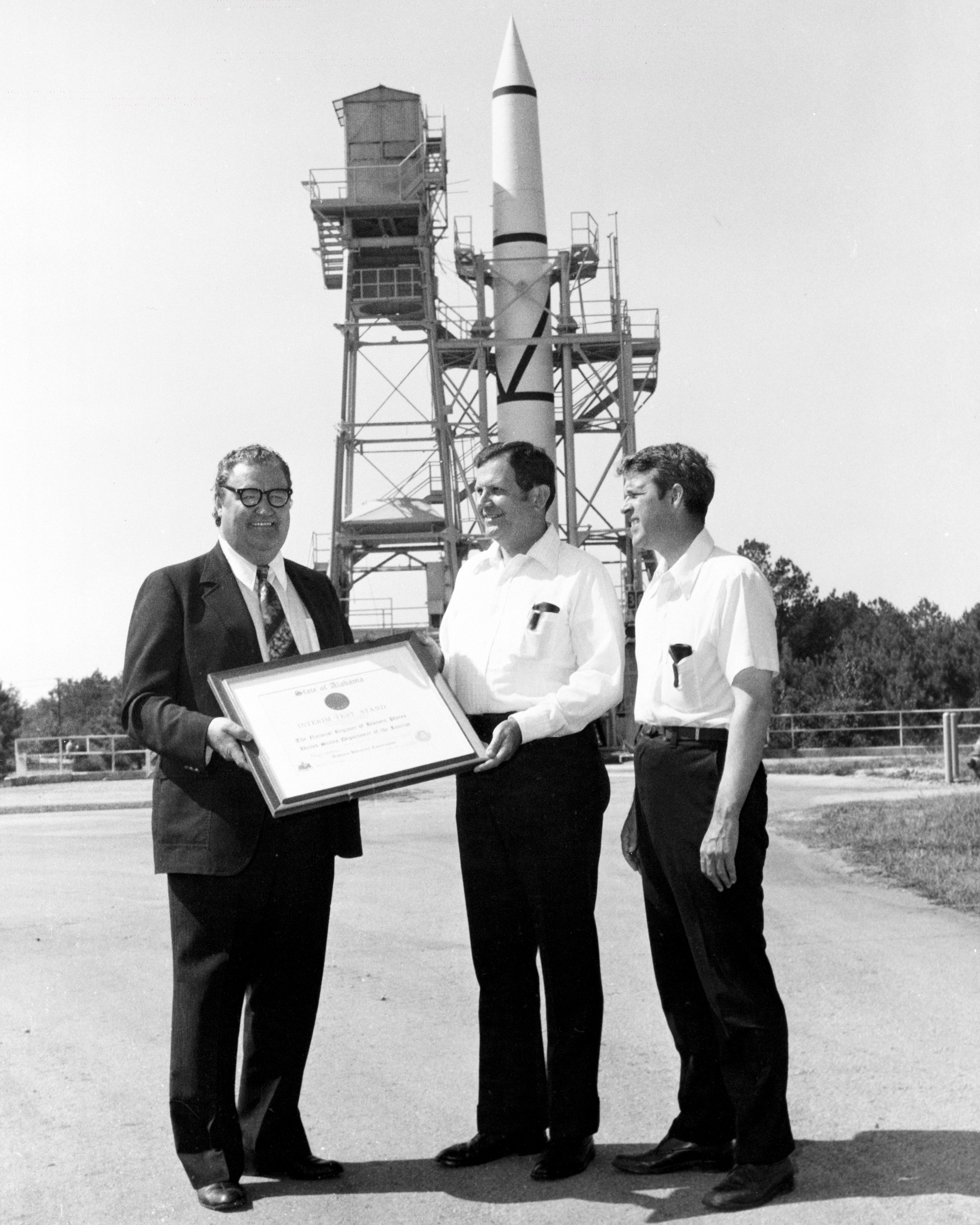
Marshall Space Flight Center director William R. Lucas accepting a certificate from Madison County Commission Chairman James Record and Huntsville architect Harvie Jones (1976)

Despite Lucas' achievements (he received nearly every honor that NASA could bestow), few people outside the aerospace community heard of him prior to the Challenger tragedy. In the aftermath of the incident, it emerged that key personnel at Marshall, including Lucas, knew of a potentially catastrophic design flaw with the SRBs as early as 1977. The SRBs' "field joints" were supposed to close more tightly as a result of forces generated by ignition. Instead, the metal parts of the SRB casing bent away from each other, opening a gap through which hot gases could leak out and erode the O-ring seals. In the event of serious erosion, the booster could burst—which would destroy the shuttle.

Despite his outward image as a stickler for doing things according to regulations, Lucas flagrantly violated them by ordering his managers not to raise any Marshall-related issue during the "Flight Readiness Review" process that could cause a delay in the launch. Lucas had issued a standing order that Marshall was not, under any circumstances, to cause a delay in the flight manifest. As a result, Marshall Center managers did not report evidence of severe O-ring erosion during the second space shuttle mission. Rather, they opted to keep the problem within their reporting channels with the SRBs' contractor, Thiokol. Even after the O-rings were redesignated as "Criticality 1"—meaning that their failure would result in the destruction of the Orbiter—no one at Marshall suggested that the shuttles be grounded until the flaw could be fixed. As a result, no one in NASA's senior management knew about the dimensions of the problem until a NASA auditor discovered a contract for a redesigned SRB in a 1985 budget report.

Following the Challenger tragedy, a longtime Marshall Center manager, known as "Apocalypse," wrote a letter to the center's inspector general detailing Lucas' management style. This letter eventually wound up in the hands of the Rogers Commission, which investigated the accident. Following strong criticism from the commission, Lucas retired in July 1986.

In a YouTube interview published posthumously, Thiokol engineer Roger Boisjoly stated that: "[Lucas] ran [the MSFC] like a Gestapo prison camp! And I'm not exaggerating when I say that. He had his people under him scared to death because he could crush their career in a heartbeat. And he had basically stated that: 'The Marshall Space Flight Center would never, ever be responsible for delaying a launch'. Now that's sick! A guy like that should have been taken out and shot right on the spot!"

== Death ==
Lucas died at his home in Huntsville, Alabama, on February 10, 2025, at the age of 102.

== Honors ==
- In 1978, Lucas was elected a member of the National Academy of Engineering for contributions to research and engineering for space vehicles and the resolution of space flight problems.
- In 1984, Lucas (class of 1943) was given a Distinguished Alumni Award by the University of Memphis. This award is given annually to "publicly recognize alumni for distinguished personal and career accomplishments and for exemplary contributions to society that bring credit to the University of Memphis."
- In 1986, Lucas was given the Elmer A. Sperry Award, an annual award in recognition of a distinguished engineering contribution which has advanced the art of transportation. He shared the award with George W. Jeffs, Dr. George E. Mueller, George F. Page, Robert F. Thompson, and John F. Yardley for their "significant personal and technical contributions to the concept and achievement of a reusable Space Transportation System."
