= Allan J. McDonald =

American engineer (1937–2021)

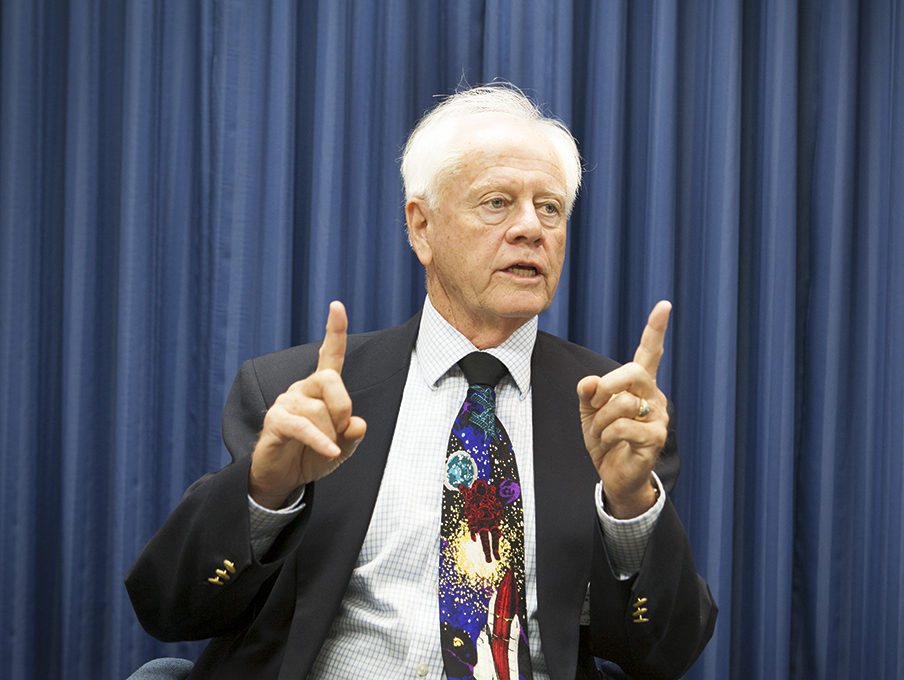
- McDonald in 2012
- Born: Allan James McDonald; July 9, 1937; Cody, Wyoming, U.S.
- Died: March 6, 2021 (aged 83); Ogden, Utah, U.S.
- Education: Montana State University (BS); University of Utah (MS)

Allan James McDonald (July 9, 1937 – March 6, 2021) was an American engineer, aerospace consultant, author and the director of the Space Shuttle Solid Rocket Motor Project for Morton-Thiokol, a NASA subcontractor. In January 1986, he refused to sign off on a launch of the Space Shuttle Challenger which then broke apart 73 seconds into flight; all seven astronauts on board were killed. McDonald had told NASA, after he had refused to sign for the launch authorization, but his boss at Thiokol did:

"...you cannot even accept that recommendation [to launch]. ...you're asking us to fly those solid rocket motors outside a temperature it's been qualified to fly in. And you can't do that. You can't fly any of the shuttle hardware outside of its qualification limits."

Deeply affected by the loss of the Challenger astronauts, McDonald endeavored to reveal the truth about the pressures to stay on launch schedule that led to the tragedy. He co-authored the 2009 book Truth, Lies, and O-Rings: Inside the Space Shuttle Challenger Disaster.

== Personal life and education ==
McDonald was born in Cody, Wyoming, on July 9, 1937, to Eva Marie (née Gingras) and John MacDonald. His father was a grocer and deputy county tax assessor. He grew up in Billings, Montana, and graduated from Montana State University with a degree in chemical engineering. After beginning work, he obtained an M.S. in engineering administration from the University of Utah in 1967. In 1986, Montana State awarded him an honorary doctorate.

McDonald married Linda Rae Zuchetto in 1963; they had three daughters and a son. He died in Ogden, Utah, on March 6, 2021, at the age of 83, following a fall in which he sustained brain damage.

== Career ==
McDonald began working for Morton-Thiokol, Inc in 1959 and was first part of the Minuteman missile program; he assisted in designing its external insulation, and was the group leader at Cape Canaveral during its flight tests. Thiokol was contracted by NASA, and McDonald was placed in charge of the space shuttle's solid rocket booster program for two years, with the job often requiring him to travel to the Kennedy Space Center to assess a shuttle's condition prior to flight.

In the lead-up to the Challenger disaster, McDonald and fellow engineers from Thiokol, including Bob Ebeling, Arnold Thompson and Roger Boisjoly, were concerned that frigid overnight temperatures would affect the O-ring seals in the solid rocket booster joints. McDonald refused to sign the official authorization form for a launch, saying, "If anything happens to this launch, I wouldn't want to be the person that has to stand in front of a board of inquiry to explain why we launched." His team concurred with the decision. NASA officials consulted other Thiokol officials directly and exerted significant pressure on them. Thiokol personnel overruled their engineers; McDonald's supervisors at Thiokol approved the launch in a fax to NASA even though McDonald did not.

During the launch of the Challenger McDonald was at Cape Canaveral as the senior representative for his company. The shuttle disintegrated during launch because of failure of the booster rocket joints, killing all seven astronauts. Deeply traumatized by the deaths of the Challenger crew, McDonald fought to hold those responsible accountable and explain the reasons for the failure, saying that pressure to meet launch schedules led to the loss. According to McDonald, NASA engineers pressured Thiokol into agreeing to the launch over the concerns expressed by Thiokol engineers, and later tried to cover that up.

Testifying before the Presidential Commission on the Space Shuttle Challenger Accident, also known as the Rogers Commission, McDonald's account revealed the coverup. According to Michael J. Neufeld,

McDonald went on to demolish the post-accident cover-up, and risk his livelihood and career, when he interrupted the testimony of NASA officials before the Rogers Commission to give his account of what happened.

After his testimony, McDonald was effectively demoted from his position at Thiokol. Boisjoly reported his and McDonald's demotion to the Rogers Commission, which displeased the company's management. McDonald and Boisjoly met with Thiokol's top executives on May 16, 1986, which involved the executives blaming the two engineers for causing public relations concerns for the company. Neufeld said McDonald "was treated as a traitor and pariah by NASA and his own company, but, thanks in part to congressional pressure, was allowed to redesign the boosters ..." Members of the US Congress introduced a resolution that threatened to prevent Thiokol from acquiring federal contracts unless McDonald's demotion was reversed. McDonald was promoted to vice president of engineering, charged with redesigning the solid rocket motors.

When the Space Shuttle program was restarted in 1988, the new booster rockets designed by McDonald were used until the end of the program in 2011. Antagonism to his testimony within Thiokol hindered his career and he was assigned to less prominent work throughout the 1990s. After he retired from the company in 2001, he became a public speaker on ethics and decision making. With James R. Hansen, he co-authored the 2009 book Truth, Lies, and O-Rings: Inside the Space Shuttle Challenger Disaster.

McDonald donated his personal papers on the accident to Chapman University in 2016 and expressed hope that they would assist in preventing the same mistakes from being made.

== Membership ==
Between 1992 and 2014, McDonald served on the board of directors for Orbital Technologies Corporation (merged in 2014 with Sierra Nevada Corporation). He was a fellow of the American Institute of Aeronautics and Astronautics and a member of Chapman University's Servant Leadership program.

== Publications ==
McDonald published more than 80 papers, a book, and a chapter in the Encyclopedia of Aerospace Engineering.

- McDonald, Allan J.; Hansen, James R. (2009). Truth, Lies, and O-Rings: Inside the Space Shuttle Challenger Disaster. Gainesville: University Press of Florida. ISBN 978-0-8130-3326-6.
- McDonald, Allan J. (2010). "Solid rocket motor failure". Encyclopedia of Aerospace Engineering: Propulsion and Power. Vol. 2. John Wiley & Sons, Ltd. doi:10.1002/9780470686652.eae106. ISBN 978-0-470-75440-5.
