= Kerzner =

Kerzner is a surname. Notable people with the surname include:

- Dave Kerzner, American musician, songwriter, producer and sound designer
- Harold Kerzner (born c. 1940), American engineer, management consultant
- Michael Kerzner, Canadian politician from Ontario
- Liana Kerzner (born 1978), Canadian television host, writer and producer
- Sol Kerzner (1935–2020), South African businessman
