= Roland Gareis =

Austrian economist

Roland Gareis (born March 15, 1948) is an Austrian economist, former professor of Project Management at the Vienna University of Economics and Business, and consultant. He is known for his work on the theory and practice of project management, and is considered co-founder of the "Management by projects" approach.

== Biography ==
=== Youth, education and early academic career ===
Gareis was born in 1948 Vienna, son of Gunter Gareis and Erika Gareis. In his early years he was an active youth player at the Austrian football club SK Rapid Wien. he participated in the 1968–69 SK Rapid Wien season. In 1969 he graduated from the Vienna University of Economics and Business with a thesis on a new structure for the Hotel and Catering Industry, where in 1972 he also obtained his PhD.

Gareis started his academic career at the Institut für Baubetrieb und Bauwirtschaft at the Vienna University of Economics and Business, where in 1979 he obtained his habilitation with a thesis on "Investment planning for the construction company."

=== Further academic career and other activities ===
From 1979 to 1981 Gareis was professor at the Georgia Institute of Technology in Atlanta, Georgia. In 1982 he started his own consultancy firm, which he continued to president during his further career. From 1994 until 2013 he was also university professor for project management at the Vienna University of Economics and Business.

Over the years he was visiting professor at the ETH Zurich (Swiss Federal Institute of Technology) in 1982, at Georgia State University in Atlanta in 1987; and at the Université du Québec in Montreal in 1991. From 1986 to 2002 he was chairman of the Project Management Association Project Management Austria, and in 1990 Research Director of the IPMA and organizer of the IPMA World Congress on "Management by Projects."

== Selected publications ==
- Gareis, Roland, ed. Handbook of management by projects. Manz, 1990.
- Gareis, Roland. Happy projects!. Editura ASE, 2006.
- David I. Cleland, Roland Gareis. Global Project Management Handbook: Planning, Organizing and Controlling International Projects, Second Edition. 2006. p. 24-21

Articles, a selection

- Gareis, Roland. "‘Management by projects’: the management approach for the future." International Journal of Project Management 7.4 (1989): 243-249.
- Gareis, Roland. "Management by projects: the management strategy of the ‘new’project-oriented company." International Journal of Project Management 9.2 (1991): 71–76.
- Gareis, Roland, and Martina Huemann. "Project management competences in the project-oriented organisation." The Gower handbook of project management. Gower: Aldershot (2000): 709–721.
- Gareis, Roland. "Management of the project-oriented company." The Wiley Guide to Project, Program and Portfolio Management (2007): 250–270.
- Gareis, Roland. "Changes of organizations by projects." International Journal of Project Management 28.4 (2010): 314–327.
