= Harold Kerzner =

American engineer and management consultant

Harold Kerzner (born ca 1940) is an American engineer, management consultant, Emeritus Professor of Systems Management at Baldwin Wallace University, and Sr. Executive Director for Project Management at the International Institute for Learning, known for his work in the field of project management.

== Education ==
Kerzner received an MS and PhD at the University of Illinois and an MBA at Utah State University.

== Career ==
Kerzner started as an engineer at the Thiokol Corporation, where he worked in program management and project engineering.

In the early 1980s, he became Professor of Systems Management at Baldwin-Wallace College, now Baldwin Wallace University.

In 1998, Kerzner received the Distinguished Service Award for his contributions to project management from the Utah State University, and the University of Illinois granted him the Distinguished Recent Alumni Award. The Project Management Institute, the Northeast Ohio Chapter, annually grants the Kerzner Award for excellent achievements in project management to a company or individual.

Kerzner is the Executive Director for International Institute for Learning (IIL). With the company, he has authored numerous books about Project Management.

== Selected publications ==
=== Textbooks ===
- 1979. Project management: a systems approach to planning, scheduling, and controlling New York : Van Nostrand Reinhold
- 1980. Project Management for Bankers. Van Nostrand Reinhold
- 1982. Project management for executives. New York : Van Nostrand Reinhold
- 1984. Project Management for the Small and Medium Sized Businesses. With Hans Thamhain. Van Nostrand Reinhold
- 1985, Project Management Policy and Strategy. With David Cleland. Van Nostrand Reinhold Publishers
- 1985. A project management dictionary of terms. With David I. Cleland. New York : Van Nostrand Reinhold
- 1986. Engineering Team Management. With David Cleland. Van Nostrand Reinhold
- 1986. Project Management Operating Guidelines. With Hans Thamhain. Van Nostrand Reinhold
- 1998. In Search of Excellence in Project Management. Van Nostrand Reinhold
- 1999. Project management: strategic design and implementation. With David I. Cleland
- 2002. Strategic planning for project management using a project management maturity model
- 2009. What Functional Managers Need to Know about Project Management. With Frank P. Saladis
- 2009. What Executives Need to Know about Project Management. With Frank P. Saladis
- 2009. Value-Driven Project Management. With Frank P. Saladis
- 2010. Managing Complex Projects.
- 2010. Project Management-Best Practices: Achieving Global Excellence, 2nd Ed.
- 2011. Project Management Metrics, KPIs and Dashboards, 1st Edition; 2nd Ed. 2013
- 2012. Project management case studies
- 2014. Project-Based Problem Solving & Decision Making. With Belack.
- 2014. Project Recovery: Case Studies and Techniques for Overcoming Project Failure
- 2014. Project Management Best Practices, 3rd Ed.
- 2015. PM 2.0
- 2017. Project Management: A Systems Approach to Planning, Scheduling and Controlling, 12th Ed.
- 2017. Project Management Workbook, 12th Ed.
- 2017. Project Management Case Studies, 5th Ed.
- 2017. Project Management Metrics, KPIs and Dashboards, 3rd Ed.
- 2018: Project Management Best Practices, 4th Ed.
- 2018. Defining Project Management Success with Application to Innovation Project Management Practices
- 2018. The Future of Project Management
- 2019. Using the Project Management Maturity Model, 3rd Ed.
- 2019. Innovation Project Management
- 2022. Project Management: A Systems Approach to Planning, Scheduling and Controlling, 13th Ed.

=== Articles ===
- 1987. "In search of excellence in project management" in: Journal of Systems Management, 1987
- 2003. "Strategic planning for a project office" in: Project Management Journal, 2003
- 2014. "Surviving Disasters in Project Management: An Interview with Dr. Harold Kerzner"
