= Judson A. Lovingood =

Former NASA executive (1936-2021)

Dr. Judson Allison Lovingood (July 18 1936 – April 29 2021), was deputy manager of the Shuttle projects office at the Marshall Space Flight Center.

== Early life and education ==
Lovingood was born in Birmingham, Alabama on July 18, 1936.

He received his bachelor of science degree in electrical engineering from the University of Alabama in 1958 and received a master of science degree from the University of Minnesota in applied math.

== Career ==
Upon graduating Lovingood worked at Martin Marietta in Orlando, and then he went to Honeywell in Minneapolis.

Lovingood joined NASA in 1962. Until 1967 he worked in dynamics and flight control, guidance and celestial mechanics, in various positions. In 1967, NASA sent Lovingood to school for one year to complete his doctor of philosophy (Ph.D) at the University of Alabama.

In 1969 Lovingood became chief of the dynamics control division of the aero astrodynamics laboratory. In 1974 he became director of the systems dynamics laboratory. All of the above positions were in the Science and Engineering Directorate of the Marshall Center. The projects supported during this period were primarily the Apollo Program, Skylab, and Space Shuttle.

In 1979 Lovingood became deputy manager of the shuttle projects office, and in February of 1982 he became manager of the shuttle main engine project.

Lovingood was one of the top executives who authorized the launch before the Space Shuttle Challenger disaster in 1986. In 1988 he left NASA for the private industry, taking a job in Huntsville, Alabama for Thiokol, the company that built the solid rocket boosters on the Challenger.

== Retirement and death ==
In 2014 Lovingood sued Discovery Channel and several other producers of a TV movie about the Challenger Disaster, accusing them of defamation for his depiction in the movie. The suit was dismissed by the Court of Appeals for the Eleventh Circuit in February 2020.

Lovingood died at 84 years old on April 29, 2021.
