= J. Wayne Littles =

American space agency executive

Jerroll Wayne Littles
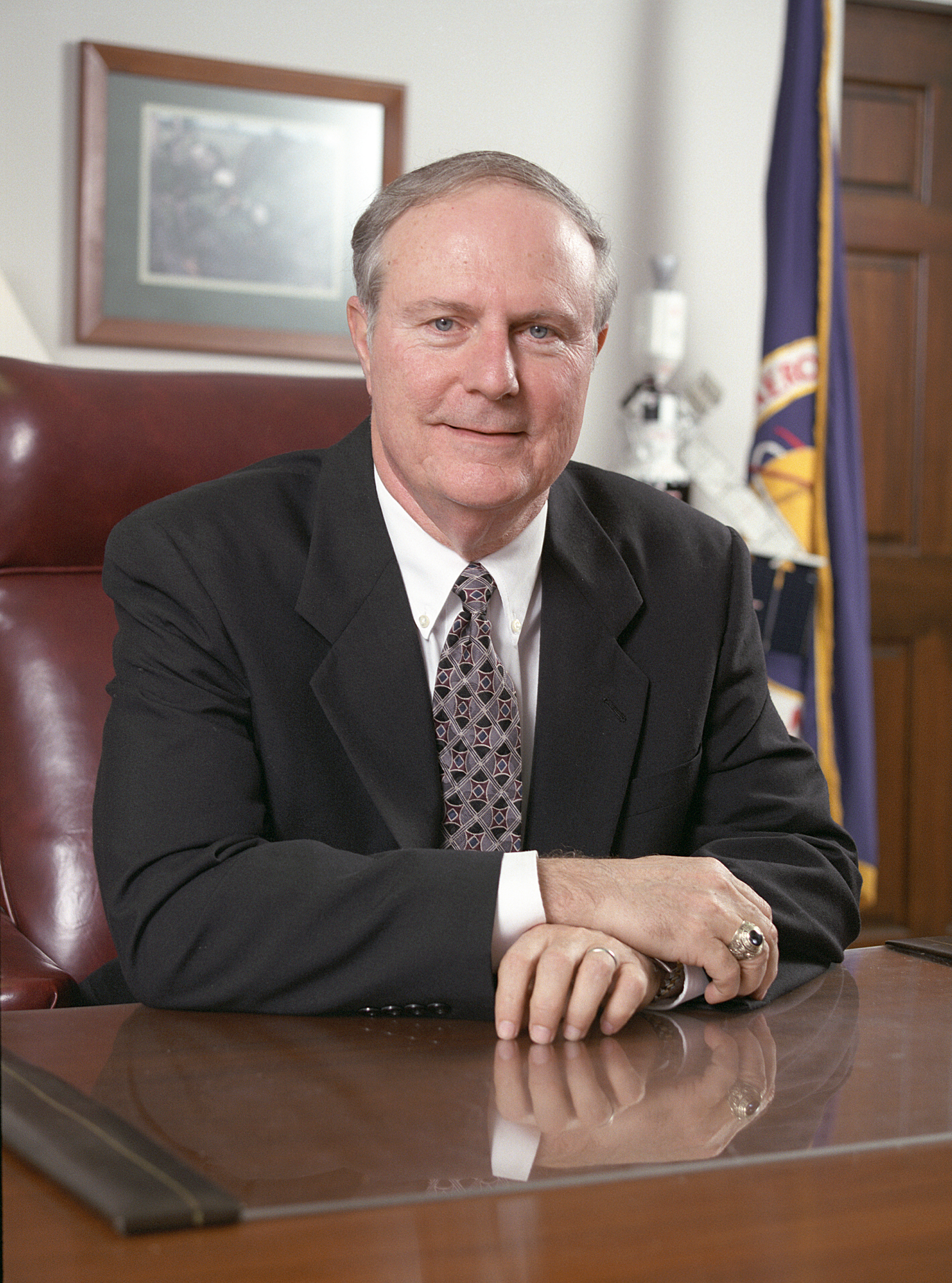
- Official NASA portrait of J. Wayne Littles
- Born: July 14, 1939 (age 87); Moultrie, Georgia, U.S.
- Occupation: NASA executive
- Title: Director of the Marshall Space Flight Center

Jerrol Wayne Littles (born July 14, 1939) was the eighth director of the NASA Marshall Space Flight Center located in Huntsville, Alabama. He served as director from February 3, 1996, to January 3, 1998.

== Early life ==
Littles was born in Moultrie, Georgia, in 1939.

== Education ==
- Attended Moultrie High School, graduating in 1957.
- Graduated from Georgia Tech in 1962 with a BME; Phi Eta Sigma, Pi Tau Sigma, Tau Beta Pi and Briaerean societies.
- Mechanical engineering master's degree from the University of Southern California in 1964.
- Doctorate from the University of Texas at Austin, mechanical engineering, in 1969.
- Harvard University, Boston, MA, six-week Advanced Management Program in 1990.

== Early career ==
- Aerospace Engineer, North American Aviation, 1962
- Rocketdyne in Canoga Park, California, worked in the propulsion area 1962–1964
- Research Engineer, Teledyne Brown Engineering, 1964

== NASA career ==
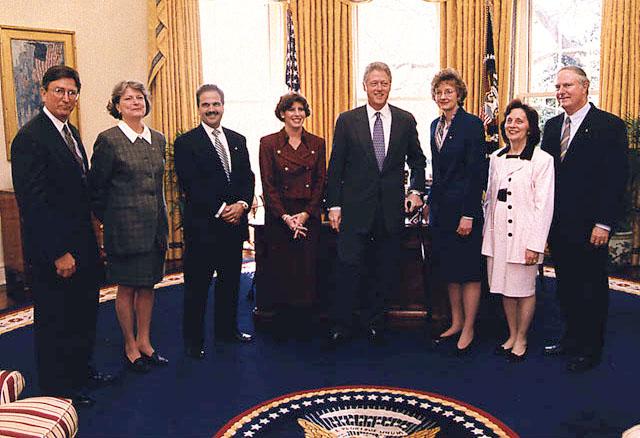
MSFC Director Dr. J. Wayne Littles and his wife with President Bill Clinton in the Oval Office of the White House following the presentation of the Presidential Rank Award for Distinguished Service. Other NASA honorees and their spouses are also pictured.

Prior to his appointment as center director, Littles served as NASA associate administrator for the Office of Space Flight (1994–1996). Littles began his NASA career in 1967 when he worked as an engineer in Marshall's former Propulsion and Vehicle Engineering Directorate. He worked in various capacities at the Marshall Center, including science engineering director (1988–1989) and center deputy director (1989–1994) before transferring to NASA Headquarters in 1994, as chief engineer. Littles was involved in the redesign of the space shuttle solid rocket booster, blamed for the Challenger disaster in 1986. Littles was also a witness for the Rogers Commission, which investigated the challenger Disaster

During his two years as Center Director, Dr. Littles' administration was responsible for the space lab mission, the space science projects, alternative light-weight launch vehicles, and their engine development. He retired from NASA in 1998.

Littles is a Fellow of the American Institute of Aeronautics and Astronautics.
