= David I. Cleland =

American engineer and educator

David Ira Cleland (March 21, 1926 – August 1, 2018) was an American engineer, Educator and professor emeritus in the School of Engineering at the University of Pittsburgh, and was recognized as the "Father of Project Management".

== Biography ==
Cleland received his bachelor's degree from the University of Pittsburgh in 1954, his MBA from the University of Pittsburgh School of Business in 1958, and his Ph.D. from Ohio State University. He started working at Wright-Patterson Air Force Base, Dayton, Ohio as a project manager in the development of weapon systems. He was also very active in Project Management at the Air Force Institute of Technology (AFIT). He eventually retired as Lieutenant Colonel In 1967 he started his academic career, teaching Project Management for 35 years at the Swanson School of Engineering, University of Pittsburgh.

Cleland received the Lifetime Achievement Award in Project Management in 2010 from the Project Management Institute (PMI), where he was a Founding Member.

Cleland also served as consultant for both national and foreign companies. He was co-founder of the University of Pittsburgh’s Manufacturing Assistance Centre (MAC), whose mission was to provide manufacturing systems technology assistance to small and mid-sized manufacturers in Western Pennsylvania.

Until 2010 he divided his time between teaching, writing and occasional speaking engagements.

== Work ==
Cleland was the author or editor of 41 books on project management, including The Project Management handbook (1988), Engineering Management and Manufacturing Management. He was the most published author of project management textbooks in the world.

=== David I. Cleland Project Management Literature Award ===
A longtime member of the Project Management Institute, Cleland was named a Fellow of PMI in 1987 and has received PMI’s Distinguished Contribution to Project Management Award an unprecedented three times. The PMI has named an award in his honor; the PMI David I. Cleland Project Management Literature Award.

Its purpose was to recognize and honor the best project management literature published during the previous calendar year. This award recognizes the author for significant contributions and for advancing the project management knowledge, practices, procedures, concepts, or other advanced techniques that demonstrate the value of using project management. The publication may be on historical, current or future endeavors.

== Publications ==
Books, a selection:

- 1978. Strategic planning and policy. with W. R. King
- 1985. A project management dictionary of terms. With Harold Kerzner. New York : Van Nostrand Reinhold
- 1986. Project stakeholder management Second Edition
- 1988. Project management handbook. with W. R. King
- 1994. Global project management handbook. with Roland Gareis.
- 1999. Project management: strategic design and implementation. With Harold Kerzner

== Death ==
Cleland died on August 1, 2018, while under the care of Passavant Retirement Community in Zelienople, Pennsylvania.
