= Roger Boisjoly =

American aerodynamics engineer (1938–2012)

- Boisjoly testifying at the Rogers Commission panel in February 1986
- Born: Roger Mark Boisjoly; April 25, 1938; Lowell, Massachusetts, U.S.
- Died: January 6, 2012 (aged 73); Nephi, Utah, U.S.
- Education: University of Massachusetts Lowell
- Known for: Attempts to prevent the Challenger disaster
- Awards: AAAS Award for Scientific Freedom and Responsibility (1988)
- Scientific career
- Fields: Mechanical Engineering
- Workplaces: Morton Thiokol

Notes
- Project manager of the solid fuel boosters of the Shuttle Program System

Roger Mark Boisjoly (/ˌboʊʒəˈleɪ/ BOH-zhə-LAY; April 25, 1938 – January 6, 2012) was an American mechanical engineer, fluid dynamicist, and an aerodynamicist. He is best known for having raised strenuous objections to the launch of the Space Shuttle Challenger months before the loss of the spacecraft and its crew in January 1986. Boisjoly correctly predicted, based on earlier flight data, that the O-rings on the rocket boosters would fail if the shuttle launched in cold weather. Morton Thiokol's managers decided to launch the shuttle despite his warnings, leading to the catastrophic failure. He was considered a high-profile whistleblower.

== Early life and education ==
Boisjoly was born on April 25, 1938, in the city of Lowell, Massachusetts to Joseph and Isabel Boisjoly. He was of French-Canadian descent. He grew up in the neighborhood of Belvidere as the son of a mill worker and one of three brothers. During high-school he played tennis.

Boisjoly studied mechanical engineering at the University of Massachusetts Lowell.

== Career ==
Boisjoly started his career at a used-aircraft company in western Massachusetts, before moving to California for work. He subsequently worked for companies in California on lunar module life-support systems and the moon vehicle. He later worked for Morton Thiokol, the manufacturer of the solid rocket boosters (SRBs) for the Space Shuttle program.

=== O-ring safety concerns ===
Simplified cross section of the joints between solid rocket booster segments; outside at left. Legend: A – steel wall 0.5 inches (12.7 mm) thick B – base O-ring, C – backup O-ring, D – Strengthening-Cover band, E – insulation, F – insulation, G – carpeting, H – sealing paste, I – fixed propellant

Boisjoly wrote a memo in July 1985 to his superiors concerning the faulty design of the solid rocket boosters that, if left unaddressed, could lead to a catastrophic event during launch of a Space Shuttle. Such a catastrophic event occurred six months later resulting in the Space Shuttle Challenger disaster.

This memo followed his investigation of a solid rocket booster (SRB) from a shuttle flight in January 1985. During his investigation, he discovered that the first of a system of two O-rings had failed completely and that damage had been caused to the second O-ring.

The O-rings were two rubber rings that formed a seal between two sections of the SRBs. The sections of the boosters were joined using tang and clevis joints and the rings were intended to seal the joint while allowing for the inevitable movement between the sections under flight conditions. By design, pressure from within the booster was to push a fillet of putty into the joint, forcing the O-ring into its seat. The system never functioned as designed. The rings were supposed to sit in a groove and seal the joint between the sections of the booster. It was found, however, that flight dynamics caused the joints in the SRBs to flex during launch, opening a gap through which rocket exhaust could escape. As the joints flexed, the rings would come out of their grooves and move to a new position in the joint, a process called extrusion. The extruded ring would form a seal in this new position, but during the time it took for the ring to shift, the joint was unsealed and hot gases could escape, a process called blow-by. These hot gases damaged the rings until the seal was achieved.

Boisjoly's investigation showed that the amount of damage to the O-ring depended on the length of time it took for the ring to move out of its groove and make the seal, and that the amount of time depended on the temperature of the rings. Cold weather made the rubber hard and less flexible, meaning that extrusion took more time and more blow-by took place. He determined that if the O-rings were damaged enough they could fail.

If the second O-ring had failed, the results would almost certainly have been catastrophic with an almost instantaneous explosion of gargantuan proportions, resulting in the complete loss of the shuttle, the crew and the launch pad facilities seemingly the only outcome. His investigation found that the first O-ring failed because the low temperatures on the night before the flight had compromised the flexibility of the O-ring, reducing its ability to form a seal. The temperature at launch had been only 10 °C (50 °F), the coldest on record (until January 28, 1986). The first rubber O-ring had formed a partial seal, not a complete one; but the second O-ring had held.

Boisjoly sent a memo describing the problem to his managers, but was apparently ignored. Following several further memos, a task force was convened to investigate the matter, but after a month Boisjoly realized that the task force had no power, no resources, and no management support. In late 1985, Boisjoly advised his managers that if the problem was not fixed, there was a distinct chance that a shuttle mission would end in disaster. No action was taken.

=== Challenger disaster ===
Following the announcement that the Challenger mission was confirmed for January 28, 1986, Boisjoly and his colleagues tried to stop the flight. Temperatures were due to fall to −1 °C (30 °F) overnight. Boisjoly felt that this would severely compromise the safety of the O-ring and potentially the flight.

The matter was discussed with Morton Thiokol managers, who agreed that the issue was serious enough to recommend delaying the flight. NASA protocols required all shuttle sub-contractors to sign off on each flight. During the go/no-go telephone conference with NASA management the night before the launch, Morton Thiokol notified NASA of their recommendation to postpone. NASA officials strongly questioned the recommendations, and asked (some say pressured) Morton Thiokol to reverse its decision.

The Morton Thiokol managers asked for a few minutes off the phone to discuss their final position again. The management team held a meeting from which the engineering team, including Boisjoly and others, were deliberately excluded. The Morton Thiokol managers advised NASA that their data was inconclusive. NASA asked if there were objections. Hearing none, NASA decided to launch the STS-51-L Challenger mission.

Historians have noted that this was the first time NASA had ever launched a mission after having received an explicit no-go recommendation from a major contractor, and that questioning the recommendation and asking for a reconsideration was highly unusual. Many have also noted that the sharp questioning of the no-go recommendation stands out in contrast to the immediate and unquestioning acceptance when the recommendation was changed to a go.

The concerns of Boisjoly proved correct. Initially, Boisjoly was relieved when the flight lifted off, as he had predicted that the SRB would explode before lift-off.

Upon ignition, the O-ring was burned to ash, which formed a weak seal in the joint. At 58 seconds after launch, the shuttle was buffeted by high-altitude winds, the ash seal collapsed, and hot gases streamed out of the joint in a visible blowtorch-like plume that burned into the external hydrogen tank. At about 73 seconds, the rear dome of the external fuel tank became weakened enough by the flame that it broke open, dumping all of the liquid hydrogen fuel into the air at once; at about the same time, the adjacent SRB strut gave way, the right rocket booster crashed into the external fuel tank and the right wing of Challenger, and the vehicle quickly disintegrated.

== Later career ==
After President Ronald Reagan ordered a presidential commission to review the disaster, Boisjoly was one of the witnesses called. He gave accounts of how and why he felt the O-rings had failed, and argued that the caucus called by Morton Thiokol managers, which resulted in a recommendation to launch, was an "unethical decision-making forum resulting from intense customer intimidation."

After the disaster, Boisjoly suffered from insomnia, depression, and severe headaches. According to Boisjoly, Thiokol unassigned him from space work, and he was ostracized by his colleagues and managers. One colleague warned him, "If you wreck this company, I’m going to put my kids on your doorstep." He filed two lawsuits against Thiokol that were later dismissed.

After leaving Morton Thiokol, Boisjoly founded a forensic engineering firm and was frequently invited to speak on leadership ethics.

== Personal life ==
For his honesty and integrity both leading up to and directly following the shuttle disaster, Boisjoly received the Award for Scientific Freedom and Responsibility from the American Association for the Advancement of Science in 1988.

When Boisjoly left Morton Thiokol, he took 14 boxes containing every note and paper he received or sent in seven years. On May 13, 2010, he donated his personal memoranda—six boxes of personal papers, including memos and notes from his congressional testimony—to Chapman University in Orange, California. Rand Boyd, the special-collections and archival librarian at Chapman's Leatherby Libraries, said the materials would be catalogued and archived. They can be viewed by library visitors. Boisjoly was followed in 2016 by fellow Challenger whistleblower Allan McDonald, who also donated his documents to Chapman University.

Boisjoly married his wife Roberta in 1963. The couple had two daughters and at the time of his death eight grandchildren. Boisjoly died on January 6, 2012, in Nephi, Utah, shortly after a diagnosis of cancer in the colon, kidneys, and liver. He was 73.

== Depiction in media ==
In the 1990 made-for-television film Challenger, Boisjoly was portrayed by actor Peter Boyle.
