= Robert Sieck =

American space agency official

Robert B. Sieck (born September 1938) is a former NASA official. As director of space shuttle processing at the Kennedy Space Center, he oversaw a large number of shuttle launches.

== Early life ==
Sieck was born in St. Louis, Missouri, in September 1938. He earned his bachelor's degree in electrical engineering at the University of Virginia in 1960. He obtained additional postgraduate credits in mathematics, physics, meteorology, and management at both Texas A&M and the Florida Institute of Technology. He served three years in the U.S. Air Force, attaining the rank of first lieutenant. While in the Air Force, he worked as a meteorologist and was involved in the activation of the LGM-25C Titan II weapon system in Tucson, Arizona.

== Career ==
Sieck joined NASA at the Kennedy Space Center in 1964 as a Gemini Spacecraft systems engineer. He served as an Apollo Spacecraft test team project engineer, Space Shuttle orbiter test team project engineer, and in 1976 was named the Engineering Manager for the Shuttle Approach and Landing tests at Dryden Flight Research Facility in California. Returning to the Kennedy Space Center in 1978, he became the Chief Shuttle Project Engineer for STS-1 through STS-7. He became the first the Kennedy Space Center Shuttle Flow Director in 1983, and in February 1984 was appointed Director, Launch and Landing Operations, where he served as Shuttle Launch Director for eleven missions.

In 1986, Sieck testified before a presidential commission during the investigation into the Space Shuttle Challenger disaster.

Sieck served as deputy director of Shuttle Operations (renamed Shuttle Processing in 1996) from April 1992 until January 1995. He was responsible for assisting with the management and technical direction of the Shuttle program at KSC. He also retained his position as Shuttle Launch Director, a responsibility he had held from February 1984 through August 1985, and then from December 1986 to January 1995. He was Launch Director for STS-26 and all subsequent shuttle missions through STS-63. Sieck served as Launch Director for 52 Space Shuttle launches.

== Personal life ==
Sieck and his wife Nancy live in Titusville and have two adult children.
