= T. Jack Lee =

Thomas Jack Lee
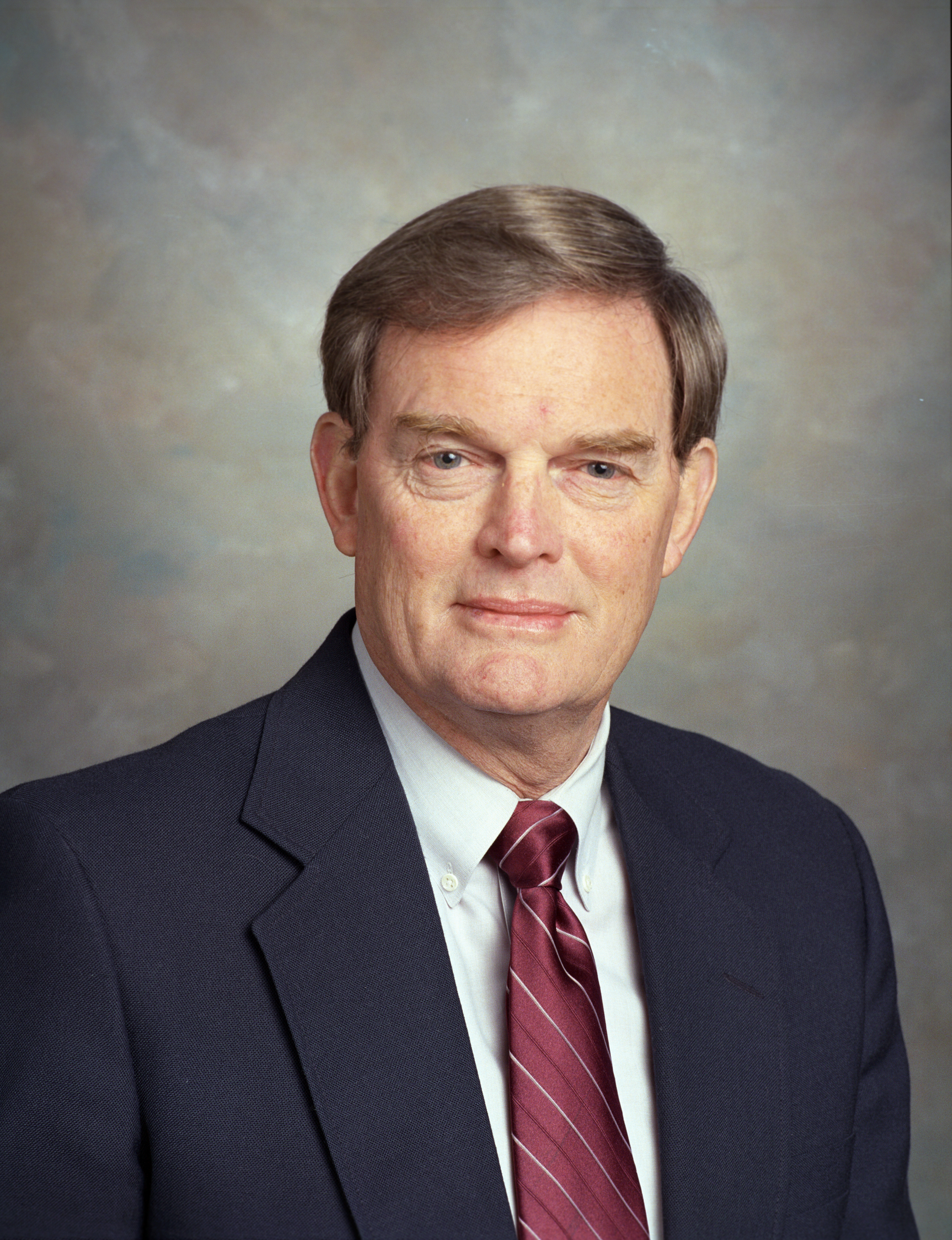
- Official NASA portrait of Thomas Jack Lee
- Born: April 1, 1935; Wedowee, Alabama, U.S.
- Died: February 24, 2019 (aged 83); Birmingham, Alabama, U.S.
- Occupations: Director of the Marshall Space Flight Center

Thomas Jack Lee (April 1, 1935 – February 24, 2019) was the sixth Director of the NASA Marshall Space Flight Center in Huntsville, Alabama, from July 6, 1989 to January 6, 1994.

== Life and career ==
Thomas Jack Lee was born in Wedowee, Alabama on April 1, 1935. Prior to his appointment as Director of the Marshall Center, Lee had been Marshall's deputy director since December 1980, after seven years as manager of the Spacelab program at the Center. From July to September 1986 he was also acting director of the Center.

In addition to his responsibilities as deputy director, Lee was manager of the Heavy Lift Launch Vehicle Definition Office, NASA's effort to define and develop a heavy lift launch vehicle capable of meeting national requirements.

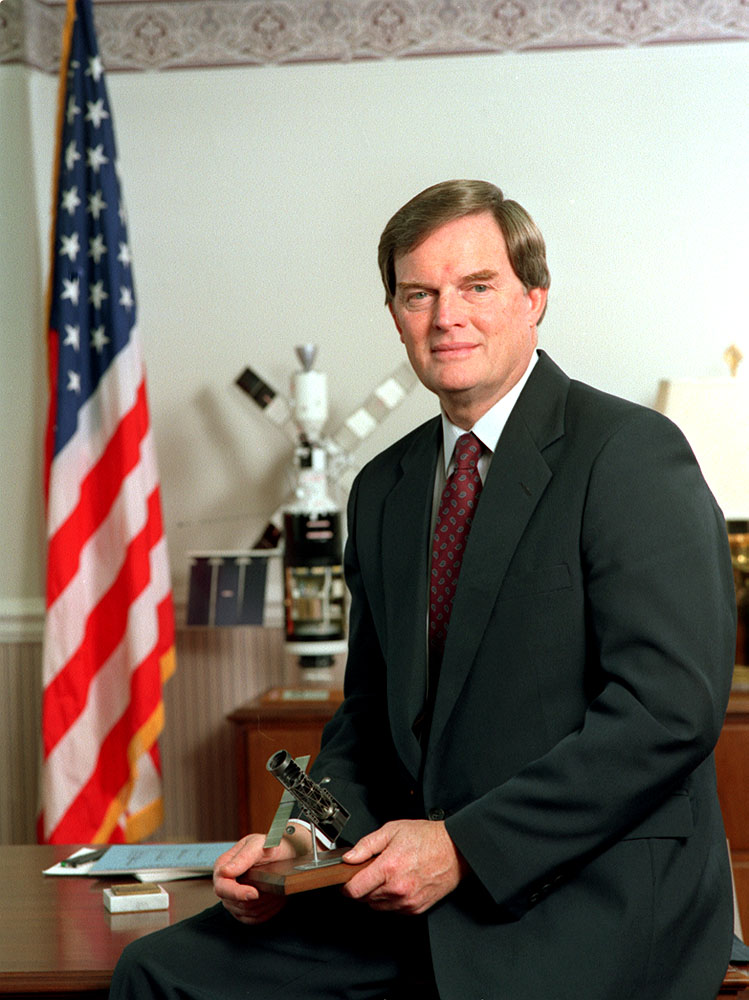
Thomas J. Lee holding a model of the Hubble Space Telescope.

Lee began his professional career in 1958 as an aeronautical research engineer with the U.S. Army Ballistic Missile Agency at the Redstone Arsenal. He transferred to the Marshall Center when it was formed in 1960 as a systems engineer with the Center's Centaur Resident Manager Office in San Diego. From 1963 to 1965 he was Resident Project Manager for the Pegasus Meteoroid Detection Satellite Project in Blandenburg, Maryland, and from 1965 to 1969 was chief of the Center's Saturn Program Resident Office at the Kennedy Space Center in Florida.

From 1969 to 1973 he was assistant to the technical deputy director of the Marshall Center. He then became deputy manager and manager of the Sortie Lab Task Team, and continued as manager when that team became the Spacelab Program Office in 1974.

As manager of the Spacelab Program Office he was responsible for NASA's work with the European Space Agency in the development of Spacelab, a multi-purpose reusable laboratory for Earth orbital science activities.

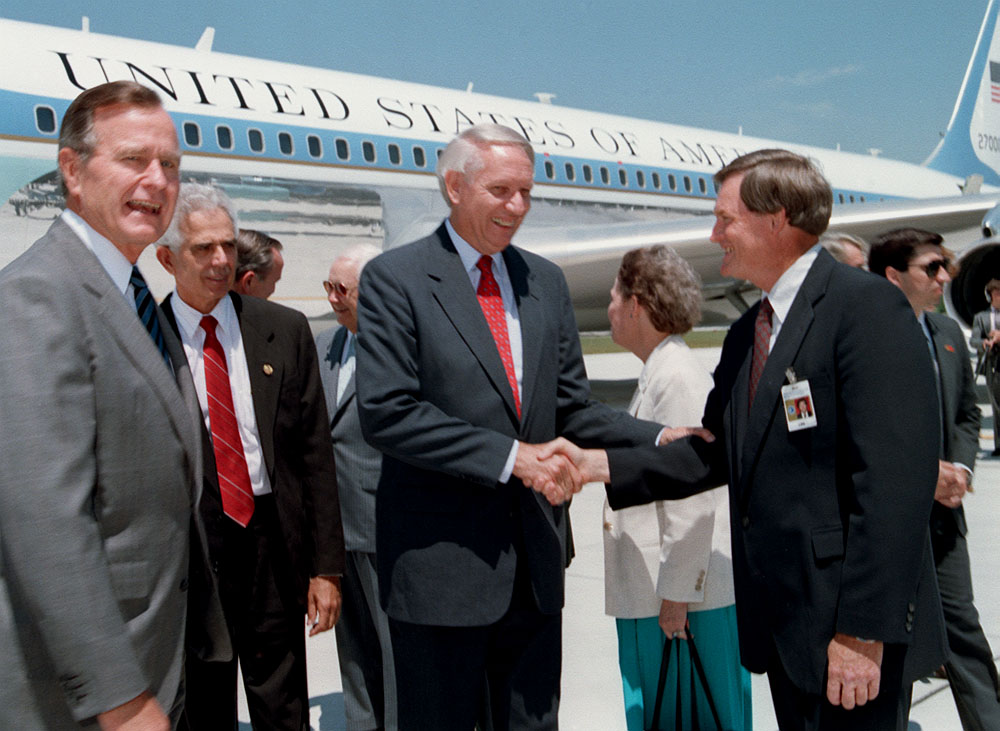
President George H. W. Bush and Alabama Governor H. Guy Hunt are greeted by Thomas J. Lee on their arrival at Redstone Arsenal airfield, June 20, 1990.

Lee died of pancreatic cancer on February 24, 2019, at the age of 83.
