= Johnny Bjerregaard =

Danish footballer and coach (born 1943)

Jørn "Johnny" Bjerregaard
Personal information
- Full name: Jørn Bjerregaard
- Date of birth: 19 January 1943 (age 83)
- Place of birth: Aarhus, Denmark
- Position: Striker

Youth career
- Hasle BK
- 1954–1962: AGF

Senior career*
Years	Team	Apps	(Gls)
1962–1966	AGF	89	(61)
1966–1972	Rapid Wien	151	(96)
1971–1972	SC Eisenstadt	84	(25)

International career
1961	Denmark U19	3	(0)
1962–1966	Denmark U21	5	(2)

Managerial career
- 1976–1977: AGF
- * Club domestic league appearances and goals

Jørn "Johnny" Bjerregaard (born 19 January 1943) is a Danish retired footballer and football coach.

== Career ==
=== AGF ===
Bjerregaard played for AGF between 1962 and 1966, where he was a dangerous striker in the Danish 1. Division. He was most often paired with Henning Enoksen. He won silver medals in the Danish cup in 1964, and bronze medals in 1962. In the 1965 season he was joint top scorer, shared with Per Petersen, who played for B 1903.

=== Rapid Vienna ===
In 1966 he joined Austrian Rapid Vienna, where he turned professional. He won the Austrian championship twice and the Austrian cup three times. In 1968 he was the topscorer in the Austrian Bundesliga, and in 1968 and 1970 he was named as the player of the year in Austrian football.

His grand achievement was an equalising goal against Real Madrid on 20 November 1968 at Estadio Santiago Bernabéu. The Austrians had won the first match 1-0 and was trailing away. Even though Real Madrid won the match, Rapid Vienna advanced on the away goals rule.

== Coaching career ==
In 1976 Bjerregaard had a short stint as the head coach of his former club, AGF. In the Danish 2nd Division (at the time the 2nd highest level) he led the team to promotion. Despite success he quit the job, and moved back to Austria.
