= 1968–69 Austrian Cup =

Tournament details
- Country: Austria

Final positions
- Champions: Rapid Wien
- Runner-up: Wiener Sport-Club

The 1968–69 Austrian Cup (German: ÖFB-Cup) was the 35th season of Austria's nationwide football cup competition. The final was held at the Praterstadion, Vienna on 3 June 1969.

The competition was won by Rapid Wien after beating Wiener Sport-Club 2–1.

== First round ==
Team 1	Score	Team 2
10 August 1968
FC Dornbirn	0–1	SK Austria Klagenfurt
Semperit Traiskirchen	1–3	SV Austria Salzburg
SC Oberwart	0–0 (a.e.t.)	Wolfsberger AC
SK Vorwärts Steyr	2–4	Schwarz-Weiß Bregenz
SK VÖEST Linz	5–0	FC Lustenau
Wacker Wien	2–0	SK Sturm Graz
WSG Wattens	2–1	Linzer ASK
WSV Donawitz	0–3	SK Rapid Wien
11 August 1968
WSV Eisenerz	0–10	Admira-Energie Wien
SC Austria Lustenau	1–3	SC Eisenstadt
1. Simmeringer SC	1–4 (a.e.t.)	FC Wacker Innsbruck
FC ÖMV Stadlau	1–3	Grazer AK
SC Kufstein	1–2	WSG Radenthein
21 August 1968
SK Bischofshofen	0–1	Wiener Sport-Club
11 September 1968
First Vienna FC	3–4	FK Austria Wien
SC Tulln	w/o	Westbahn Linz
Replay: 15 December 1968
Wolfsberger AC	2–0	SC Oberwart

== Second round ==
Team 1	Score	Team 2
29 October 1968
Schwarz-Weiß Bregenz	1–2	FC Wacker Innsbruck
9 November 1968
Grazer AK	1–2	SK Austria Klagenfurt
WSG Wattens	2–0	Wacker Wien
Admira-Energie Wien	4–2	WSG Radenthein
22 December 1968
SC Tulln	1–0	SV Austria Salzburg
15 February 1969
SC Eisenstadt	2–3	FK Austria Wien
Wiener Sport-Club	6–1	Wolfsberger AC
19 March 1969
SK Rapid Wien	3–0	SK VÖEST Linz

== Quarter-finals ==
Team 1	Score	Team 2
22 February 1969
Admira-Energie Wien	0–1	FK Austria Wien
23 February 1969
SC Tulln	0–1	Wiener Sport-Club
9 March 1969
WSG Wattens	1–0	SK Austria Klagenfurt
26 March 1969
SK Rapid Wien	3–0	FC Wacker Innsbruck

== Semi-finals ==
Team 1	Score	Team 2
14 May 1969
FK Austria Wien	0–1	SK Rapid Wien
15 May 1969
Wiener Sport-Club	2–0	WSG Wattens

== Final ==
3 June 1969
19:30

SK Rapid Wien	2–1	Wiener Sport-Club
Bjerregaard 52', 84'	Report	Buzek 90'

Praterstadion, Vienna
Attendance: 14,000
Referee: Franz Wöhrer
