= Günter Kaltenbrunner =

Austrian footballer and manager

Personal information
- Date of birth: 28 July 1943 (age 83)
- Place of birth: Znojmo, Protectorate of Bohemia and Moravia
- Height: 1.78 m (5 ft 10 in)
- Position: Forward

Senior career*
Years	Team	Apps	(Gls)
1960–1961	Wacker Wien	7	(2)
1961–1966	Admira Energie Wien	87	(56)
1966–1967	SW Bregenz	23	(10)
1967–1969	Rapid Wien	22	(14)
1969–1970	Wiener Sport-Club	30	(22)
1970–1972	Nice	52	(12)
1972–1974	Admira Wacker Wien	53	(21)
1974–1975	Wiener Sport-Club		

International career
1962–1968	Austria	4	(0)

Managerial career
- 1978–1981: SC Eisenstadt
- 1981: Wiener Sport-Club
- 1986: Kremser SC
- * Club domestic league appearances and goals

Günter Kaltenbrunner (born 28 July 1943) is a former Austrian football player and manager. He made four appearances for the Austria national football team between 1962 and 1968. He was coach from SC Eisenstadt in the 1980–81 season. Later he worked for the Bank Austria and was President of SK Rapid Wien from 1995 until 1999.
