= Thiokol =

Defunct American rubber, related chemicals and rocket manufacturer (1929–2007)

Thiokol Chemical Corporation
- Industry: Aerospace, Manufacturing, Chemicals
- Founded: December 5, 1929
- Defunct: 2007, succeeded by Orbital ATK; and later acquired by Northrop Grumman
- Fate: Purchased by ATK Launch Systems Group
- Headquarters: Ogden, Utah, US
- Products: Rocket engines, Snowcats
- Number of employees: 15,000
- Parent: Cordant Technologies

Thiokol was an American corporation concerned initially with rubber and related chemicals, and later with rocket and missile propulsion systems. Its name is a portmanteau of the Greek words for sulfur (Greek: θεῖον, romanized: theion) and glue (Greek: κόλλα, romanized: kolla), an allusion to the company's initial product, Thiokol polymer.

The Thiokol Chemical Company was founded in 1929. Its initial business was a range of synthetic rubber and polymer sealants. Thiokol was a major supplier of liquid polymer sealants during World War II. When scientists at the Jet Propulsion Laboratory discovered that Thiokol's polymers made ideal binders for solid rocket fuels, Thiokol moved into the new field, opening laboratories at Elkton, Maryland, and later production facilities at Elkton and at Redstone Arsenal in Huntsville, Alabama. Huntsville produced the XM33 Pollux, TX-18 Falcon, and TX-135 Nike-Zeus systems. It closed in 1996. In the mid-1950s, the company bought extensive lands in Utah for its rocket test range.

Thiokol was involved in two major accidents with loss of life. On February 3, 1971, at a Thiokol chemical plant southeast of Woodbine, Georgia, a fire entered a storage facility holding nearly five tons of ignition pellets, flares, and other highly flammable materials. The facility exploded, killing 29 people and severely wounding more than 50 others, many with severed limbs. Windows were shattered 11 miles (18 km) away and the explosion was heard for 50 miles (80 km) around. Georgia law prevented the employees from suing their employer because they were covered by workers' compensation insurance.

On January 28, 1986, the Space Shuttle Challenger exploded 73 seconds into its flight, killing all seven crew members. An investigation found the cause to be two failed O-ring seals in the Space Shuttle's right solid rocket booster, which had been manufactured by Morton Thiokol. Test data from as early as 1977 had revealed a potentially catastrophic flaw in the O-rings in cold conditions, but neither Morton Thiokol nor NASA assessed or corrected the problem. Shortly before takeoff, several Morton Thiokol engineers recommended delaying the launch until temperatures at Cape Canaveral warmed, but they were overruled by company management.

== Company history ==
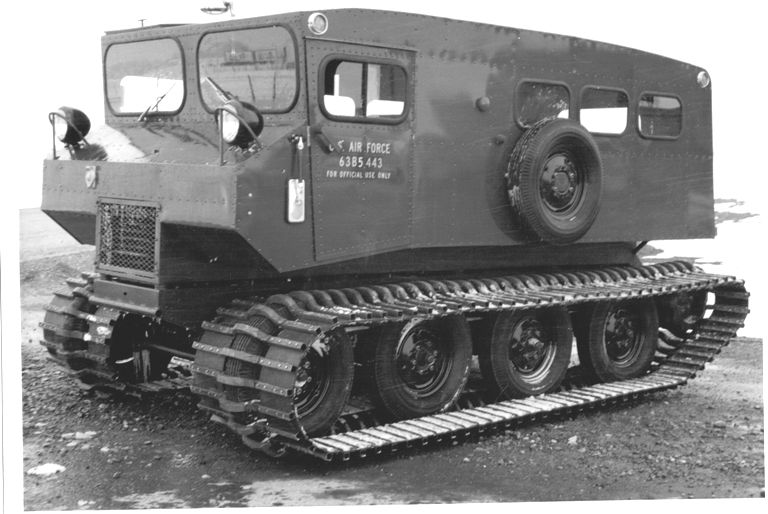
Model 601 U.S.A.F. Thiokol Snowcat

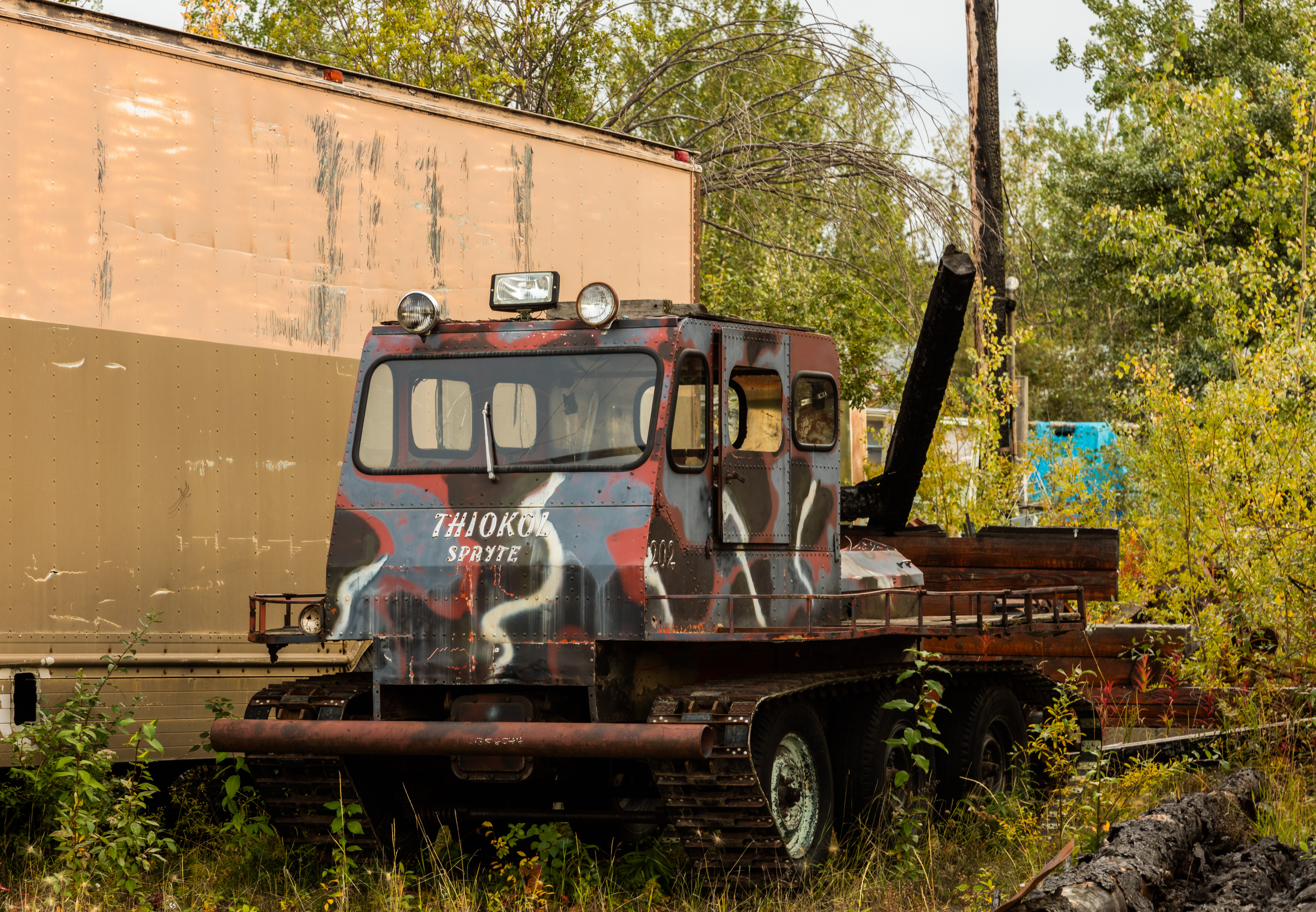
Thiokol Spryte used for winter service

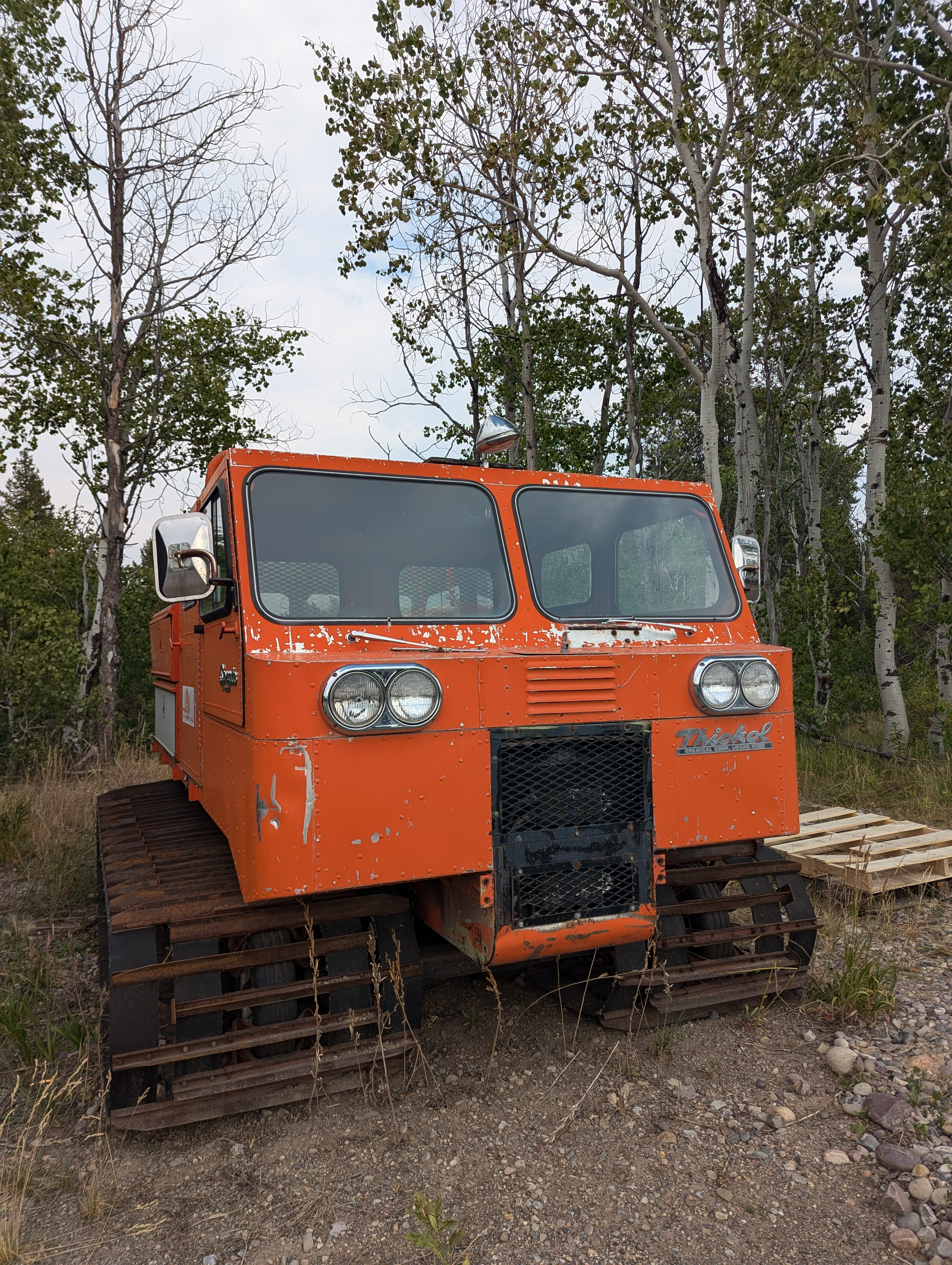
Snowcat in Grand Teton National Park, Wyoming

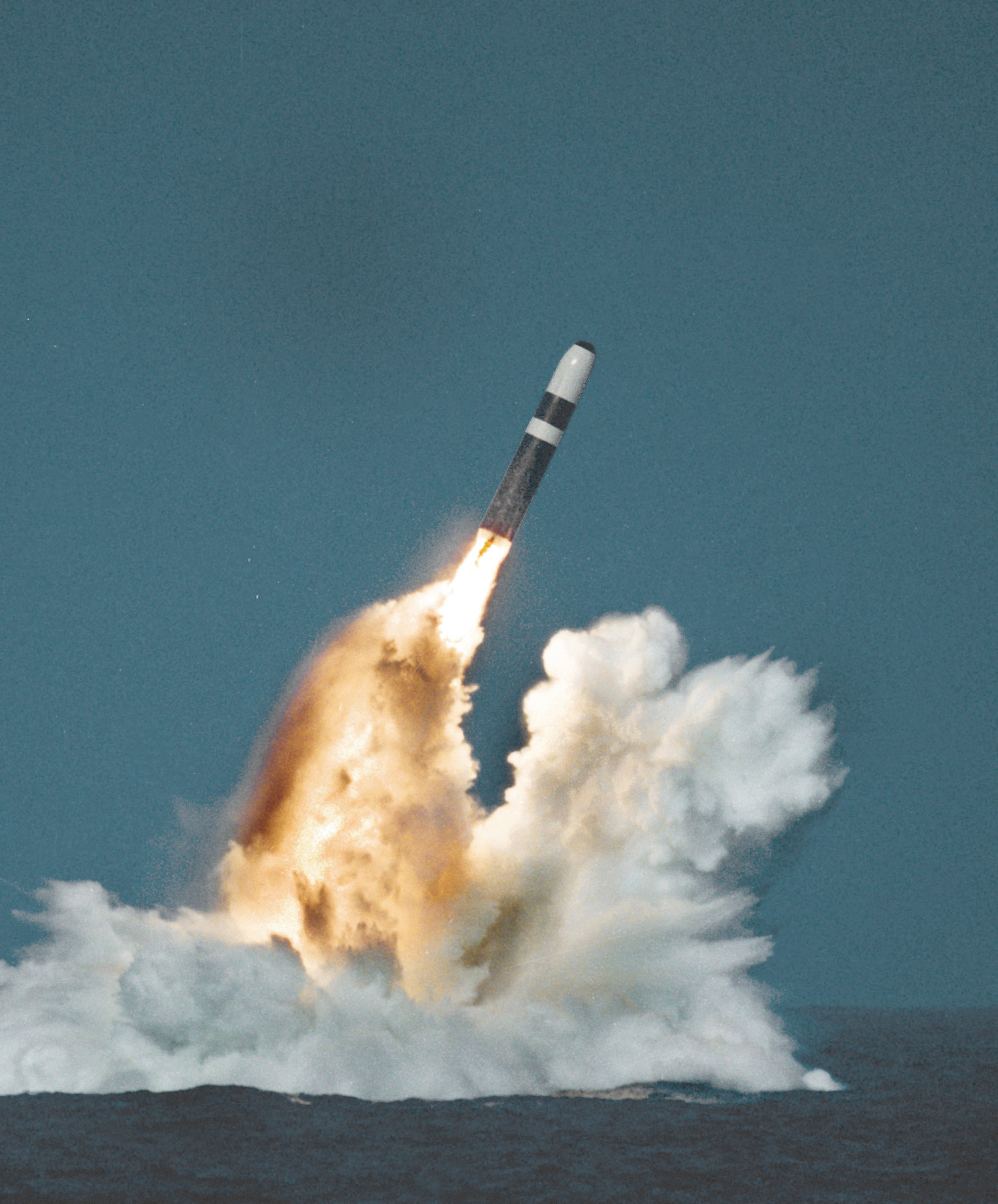
A Trident II (D-5) FBM launches and fires its Thiokol solid rocket first stage.

In 1926, two chemists, Joseph C. Patrick and Nathan Mnookin, were trying to invent an inexpensive antifreeze. In the course of an experiment involving ethylene dichloride and sodium polysulfide, they created a gum whose outstanding characteristic was a terrible odor. The substance clogged a sink in the laboratory, and none of the solvents used to remove it were successful. The frustrated chemists realized that the resistance of the material to any kind of solvent was a useful property. They had invented a synthetic rubber, which they christened "Thiokol". In 1929, Bevis Longstreth, an executive at Morton Salt, founded the Thiokol Corporation in Trenton, New Jersey. He became its president and general manager.

Longstreth died in 1944, leaving the position of president and general manager open. William Crosby became general manager. The next year, in 1945, Charles Bartley, working for the nascent Jet Propulsion Laboratory, discovered the use of thiokol as a stabilizer in solid-fuel rockets. In 1948, a plant in Elkton, Maryland was opened, producing solid rocket motors. In 1949, Thiokol produced the TX-18 Falcon missile, the world's first solid-fueled missile system.

In 1957, anticipating the forthcoming Minuteman contract, the company built its plant west of Brigham City, Utah, near Promontory and Thiokol Huntsville began building XM33 Pollux missiles.

In 1958, Thiokol merged with Reaction Motors Inc. (RMI), makers of liquid propellant rocket motor systems. Also in 1958, Thiokol received a contract to build the TU-122 rocket motor for the first stage of the LGM-30 Minuteman ICBM system. In 1959, Thiokol Huntsville began producing CASTOR strap-on booster rocket, used on the Atlas rocket.

In 1964, the Woodbine, Georgia plant was constructed to build solid propellant motors for NASA, but the agency changed course and used liquid fuel.

In 1969, Thiokol was awarded a U.S. Army contract to manufacture 750,000 Tripflares for use in the Vietnam War. In 1971, an explosion in the magnesium flare assembly facility at the Woodbine plant killed 29 and injured 50. In 1974, Thiokol won the contract to build the solid rocket booster (SRB) for the Space Shuttle. In 1975, Thiokol succeeded Sperry Rand as operator of the large Louisiana Army Ammunition Plant near Minden, Louisiana. In 1978, the company sold its ski lift division to CTEC and its snow equipment division to Logan Manufacturing Company (LMC), owned by John DeLorean.

In 1980, Thiokol acquired Carlisle Chemical Company of Cincinnati, Ohio. In 1982, Thiokol merged with Morton-Norwich products (owners of the Morton Salt concern, the Simoniz automotive products brand, and various chemical concerns) with the merged company called Morton Thiokol Incorporated (MTI).

In 1986, an O-ring fault in an MTI SRB destroyed Space Shuttle Challenger in flight. The company was found at fault for the destruction of Challenger and deaths of the astronauts, as a direct result of pressure from NASA to launch, based on inconclusive evidence of the failure of O-rings on the solid rocket boosters when subject to freezing temperatures. (See Space Shuttle Challenger disaster).

In 1989, Morton Thiokol split, with most of the chemical concern going with Morton but the propulsion systems division became Thiokol Inc. Then in 1998, Thiokol changed its name to Cordant Technologies. Also in 1998, Thiokol branded polymer products purchased by PolySpec L.P., a Houston-based manufacturer of industrial coatings, marine decking, and subsea insulation products.

In 2000, Thiokol merged with two divisions of Alcoa and with Howmet Castings and Huck Fasteners to become AIC Group (Alcoa Industrial Components). In 2001, Alliant Techsystems (ATK) Inc. (a company formed when Honeywell spun off its defense division) spent $2.9 billion buying Thiokol and related businesses from AIC/Alcoa. ATK built the third stage of the Trident missile and had earlier bought Hercules Aerospace Co., builder of the second stage. With the purchase of Thiokol, makers of the missile's first stage, ATK controlled the lion's share of the US solid rocket-fuel market. In 2005, ATK-Thiokol won the contract to produce the Ares I launch vehicle first stage for NASA's Project Constellation.

In 2006, Alliant Techsystems (ATK) Inc. was renamed ATK-Thiokol and then ATK Launch Systems Group. In 2014, Orbital ATK was formed from the merger of Orbital Sciences Corporation and parts of Alliant Techsystems. In 2018, Orbital ATK was purchased by Northrop Grumman.

== Products ==
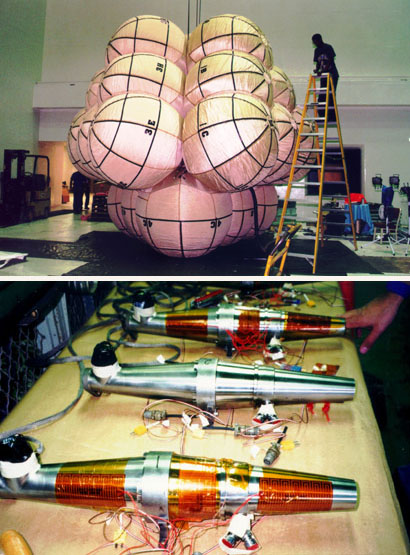
Thiokol gas generators were used in the airbags on Mars Pathfinder. The top photo shows a complete airbag assembly under test, the bottom shows the three titanium Thiokol gas generators used to inflate the airbags.

Products made by the aerospace divisions of RMI and Thiokol include motors used in Subroc, the Pershing missile, the Peacekeeper missile, Poseidon missile, Minuteman missile, and the Trident I and Trident II missiles. Thiokol produces powerplants for numerous U.S. military missile systems, including AIM-9 Sidewinder, AGM-88 HARM, AGM-65 Maverick, AGM-69 SRAM, and AIR-2 Genie.

Thiokol also produced a variety of liquid and solid rocket motors for the US space program, including deorbit motors for the Mercury and Gemini programs, rocket stages and separation rocket motors for the Apollo program, motors for the Pioneer, Surveyor, Viking, Voyager, and Magellan missions, updated CASTOR boosters for the Delta rocket, and the Space Shuttle Solid Rocket Booster. Reaction Motors powerplants propelled the X-1 and X-15 aircraft, and later Thiokol technologies were also used in the private Tier One crewed spaceplane. On March 1, 2006, NASA announced that Thiokol will be the prime contractor for the new Crew Launch Vehicle (CLV), to be known as the Ares I, which will put the Orion spacecraft (formerly known as the "Crew Exploration Vehicle") into low Earth orbit, along with the five-segment SRBs for the heavy-lift Cargo Launch Vehicle (CaLV), known as the Ares V.

In addition to ski lifts, Thiokol produced a range of equipment for ski resorts including snowcats and snow grooming vehicles. These businesses were spun off in 1978 when the company restructured itself to concentrate on its rocket products and related technologies. John Z. DeLorean purchased the Thiokol snowcat operation and renamed it DMC. DMC continued to manufacture snowcats until 1988, when the company was renamed LMC. LMC continued making snowcats for 12 more years but ceased operations in 2000. Thiokol produced snow vehicles with a wide range of capabilities and duties. The company also produced several utility based vehicles based on their snowcat tracked vehicle, in addition to larger snow grooming machines suitable for use on steep ski-slopes. Thiokol machines were used in ski resorts, operated by the USAF in Alaska and other northern regions, and are now popular with private owners as dependable snowcats and for all-terrain transport.

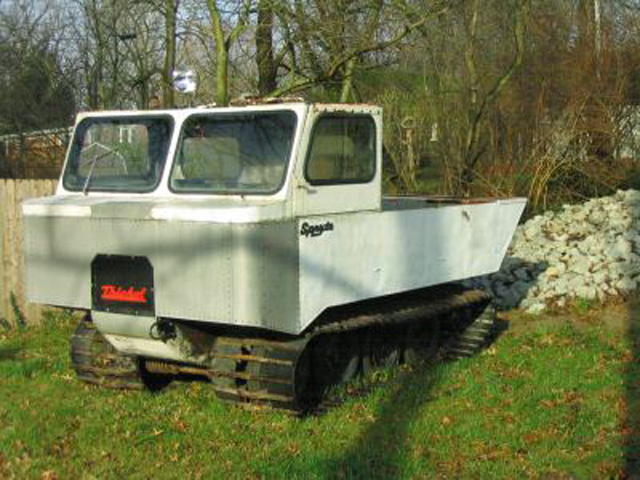
Amphibious Thiokol Swamp Spryte All Terrain Vehicle

Thiokol pioneered the short-burn rocket motors used in aircraft ejection seats. The company also produced a number of the earliest practical airbag systems, building the high-speed sodium azide exothermic gas generators used to inflate the bags. Thiokol bags were first used in U.S. military aircraft, before being adapted to space exploration (Mars Pathfinder bounced down on Mars on Thiokol airbags) and automotive airbags. Thiokol's generators form the core of more than 60% of airbags sold worldwide.
