= Genius: The Life and Science of Richard Feynman =

1992 book by James Gleick

- Author: James Gleick
- Language: English
- Subject: Physics, Biography
- Genre: Nonfiction
- Publisher: Pantheon
- Publication date: 1992
- Publication place: United States
- Media type: Print (hardcover and paperback)
- Pages: 530
- ISBN: 978-0679747048
- Preceded by: Chaos: Making a New Science
- Followed by: Faster: The Acceleration of Just About Everything

Genius: The Life and Science of Richard Feynman (1992) is a biography of the American physicist Richard Feynman by James Gleick.

== Background ==
Feynman's work involved quantum electrodynamics, for which he shared the 1965 Nobel Prize in Physics. Gleick writes that "At least three of his later achievements might also have done so: a theory of superfluidity, the strange frictionless behavior of liquid helium; a theory of weak interactions, the force that works in radioactive decay; and a theory of partons, hypothetical hard particles inside the atom's nucleus, that helped produce the modern understanding of quarks."

In addition to his science, Feynman was famous for The Feynman Lectures on Physics (1964). He achieved popular fame with Surely You're Joking, Mr. Feynman! (1985) and What Do You Care What Other People Think? (1988), consisting of stories told to his friend Ralph Leighton. Gleick said "I have tried not to lean on them too heavily," adding that they are "mostly accurate, but strongly filtered."

== Content ==
Gleick gives the context of Feynman's work, offering a brief history of quantum mechanics: Max Planck's discovery of quanta; Einstein's application of quanta to the photoelectric effect; Niels Bohr's model of the atom. In 1925, Schrödinger presented wave mechanics and Heisenberg presented matrix mechanics, which turned out to be equivalent. In 1928, Paul Dirac published his relativistic wave equation, which predicted the existence of anti-matter. Dirac's The Principles of Quantum Mechanics was an influence on the young Feynman.

He traces Feynman's life from his childhood in Far Rockaway, Queens to his education at MIT; from Princeton to Los Alamos National Laboratory, where his boss Hans Bethe persuaded him to come to Cornell; and finally Caltech. Gleick covers many other physicists, among them Feynman's theses advisor John Archibald Wheeler, his Cornell colleague Freeman Dyson, his competitor (and eventual co-Nobelist) Julian Schwinger and Feynman's sister Joan, an astrophysicist. He includes asides on the nature of genius and the relationship between science and religion.

He describes Feynman's marriage to Arline Greenbaum. She contracted tuberculosis, and they wed against their parents' wishes. When Feynman was at Los Alamos, he wrote to her at an Albuquerque sanitarium. She succumbed to tuberculosis in 1945. While researching the biography, Gleick came across a letter Feynman wrote to Arline after she died. Gleick recalled that "My heart stopped. I have never had an experience like that as a biographer, before or since."

== Reception ==
Philip W. Anderson, in Science, praised Gleick for probing Feynman beyond the "joker and self-created legend" of the Leighton books.

Walter Moore, in The New York Times, criticized Gleick for eschewing equations, concluding: "No written words can convey the depths of Richard Feynman. Mr. Gleick's book at least provides a good introduction for those who were not privileged to know him personally. He was a man of absolute integrity; his understanding of physics was unequaled; he was an inspired teacher; and he once lived a love story that surpasses our understanding."

Alan Lightman wrote: "In describing not only Feynman but the physicists around him, Gleick also succeeds in giving us a rare insight into the scientific community, its values, and its mentality." He compared it favorably to Abraham Pais's Subtle is the Lord: The Science and the Life of Albert Einstein. However, Lightman criticized Gleick for not explaining Feynman's science more clearly.

Freeman Dyson wrote: "Although I am a longtime friend and admirer of Feynman, I feel that I know him better after reading this book than I did before."

Genius was a finalist for the Pulitzer Prize for Biography but lost to Truman by David McCullough. It was also nominated for the National Book Award for Nonfiction but lost to Becoming a Man: Half a Life Story by Paul Monette.

Other Feynman biographies followed: John and Mary Gribbin's Richard Feynman: A Life in Science and The Beat of a Different Drum: The Life and Science of Richard Feynman by Jagdish Mehra.

== See also ==
- The Character of Physical Law (1964), Feynman's Messenger Lectures
- The Feynman Lectures on Physics (1964)
- QED: The Strange Theory of Light and Matter (1985)
- Tuva or Bust! (1991) by Ralph Leighton
