= QED (play) =

Play written by Peter Parnell

QED is a play by American playwright Peter Parnell that chronicles significant events in the life of Nobel Prize-winning physicist Richard Feynman. It presents scenes from a fictional day in Feynman's life, less than two years before his death, interweaving many strands from his biography, from the Manhattan Project to the Challenger disaster inquiry to more personal topics such as the death of Feynman's wife and his own fight with cancer. The play, which grew out of a collaboration between Parnell, actor Alan Alda, and director Gordon Davidson, premiered in 2001. The original production, directed by Davidson and starring Alda as Feynman, was performed first at the Mark Taper Forum in Los Angeles and, from late 2001 to mid-2002, on Broadway.

== Name ==
The name refers to both Quantum ElectroDynamics, a field in particle physics, and Q.E.D. (quod erat demonstrandum), a phrase used at the end of a mathematical proof, to indicate completeness.

== Plot ==
Set in June, 1986, less than two years before Feynman's death, in Feynman's office at the California Institute of Technology in Pasadena, the play follows Feynman through a day of his life. As the real Feynman does in his books What Do You Care What Other People Think? and Surely You're Joking, Mr. Feynman!, the stage character talks directly to the audience; we learn from this and from phone calls with off-stage characters that Feynman is to appear that night playing his bongo drums in a student production of the musical South Pacific, that he is expecting a delegation from the Russian Republic of Tuva, which Feynman is whimsically determined to visit (as detailed in Ralph Leighton's book, Tuva or Bust!), and that he is eager to make his views known in the final report of the Rogers Commission charged with the Challenger disaster. From phone conversations between Feynman and his doctors, we also learn that Feynman's cancer has returned, and that his doctors are urging him to undergo further surgical procedures, which are not without their own risk. Feynman's conversation with the audience also touches on a number of additional topics well-known to readers of his autobiographical writings: the Manhattan Project and safe-cracking, how he learned to draw, his father, as well as musings on physics and, more generally, on the nature of science and knowledge.

In the second act, the play returns to Feynman's study later at night on the same day, after the performance is over. We meet the only other character in addition to the main protagonist: a (fictional) young student by the name of Miriam Field, who has attended one of Feynman's lectures and both witnessed his bongo performance and attended the after-play party. Where Feynman had earlier grown dispirited both by his own condition and by memories of his long-dead wife, Miriam manages to pull him out of his depression. Feynman informs his doctors that he will consent to have surgery, after all; but requests that they awaken him from anesthesia if they determine that he is about to die intraoperatively, because "that would be an interesting experience".

== History and productions ==
In the mid-1990s, Alan Alda, having read Feynman's autobiographical books, became intent on playing Feynman on stage. He consulted director Gordon Davidson at the Mark Taper Forum in Los Angeles, who suggested that playwright Peter Parnell be the play's author. Over the course of more than six years, the three went through many revisions in their combined effort to bring the many facets of Feynman's character to the stage.

The play premiered on March 25, 2001, at the Mark Taper Forum. Later that year, the production went to Broadway, where it was performed 40 times between November 18, 2001 and June 20, 2002 at the Vivian Beaumont Theater. Six years later, Alda briefly revisited his role in a scenic reading at Columbia University's Miller Theatre as part of the 2008 World Science Festival, once more directed by Davidson.

The Chicago area premiere of QED on September 23, 2010, featured Rob Riley as Richard Feynman under the direction of Maureen Payne-Hahner. It was performed at the McCormick School of Engineering and Applied Science of Northwestern University, and was produced by ETOPiA.

It was produced in Athens, Greece in October 2004 with Yorgos Kotanidis as Richard Feynman, directed by Iossif Vardakis. It was a successful run, with a performance attended by Jim Al-Khalili. The production went on to perform the following year at a larger theater. In 2009 it was staged in the virtual reality "Tholos" dome, at the Hellenic Cosmos complex in Athens, once more playing to packed audiences. The show went on a tour of Greece in 2010

The national premiere for Italy of the play was translated and directed by Luca Giberti at the Stabile Theatre in Genoa (Sala Duse), with Andrea Nicolini playing Feynman.

The play was produced in Berkeley, CA by Indra’s Net Theater in Nov/Dec 2013 with Jeff Garrett playing Feynman and Bruce Coughran directing.

QED was produced in Philadelphia, PA by the Lantern Theater in Nov/Dec 2014 with Peter DeLaurier as Richard Feynman and M. Craig Getting directing.

== Bibliography ==
- Alda, Alan (2007), Things I Overheard While Talking to Myself, Random House, ISBN 978-1-4000-6617-9, OCLC 122309367
- Goodstein, David (May 1, 2001), "Feynman returns to centre stage", Physics World, 14 (5): 45, doi:10.1088/2058-7058/14/5/33, archived from the original on June 24, 2008
- Parnell, Peter (2002), QED: A Play, Applause Books, ISBN 978-1-55783-592-5, OCLC 50004999
- A brief excerpt from the play was published as THINK TANK: How Does a Photon Decide Where to Go? That's the Quantum Mystery in The New York Times (April 20, 2002)
