= Infinity (1996 film) =

1996 film by Matthew Broderick

- Theatrical release poster
- Directed by: Matthew Broderick
- Screenplay by: Patricia Broderick
- Based on: Surely You're Joking, Mr. Feynman! and What Do You Care What Other People Think?? by Richard Feynman & Ralph Leighton
- Produced by: Matthew Broderick; Patricia Broderick; Michael Leahy; Joel Soisson
- Starring: Matthew Broderick; Patricia Arquette; Peter Riegert; Željko Ivanek
- Cinematography: Toyomichi Kurita
- Edited by: Bill Johnson
- Music by: Bruce Broughton
- Distributed by: First Look Pictures
- Release date: October 4, 1996
- Running time: 119 minutes
- Country: United States
- Language: English
- Budget: $5 million
- Box office: $195,170

Infinity is a 1996 American biographical film about the romantic life of physicist Richard Feynman. Feynman was played by Matthew Broderick, who also directed and co-produced the film. Broderick's mother, Patricia Broderick, wrote the screenplay, which was based on the books Surely You're Joking, Mr. Feynman! and What Do You Care What Other People Think?, both written by Feynman and Ralph Leighton. It is the only film Broderick has ever directed.

== Plot ==
In 1924, Richard and his father Melville walk through the woods where Melville shows his scientific inspiration for Richard. In 1934, Richard and Arline are in high school and their romantic relationship starts. The story jumps to his college years and Arline getting sick with lymphatic tuberculosis. It continues to his move west to Los Alamos National Laboratory in Los Alamos, New Mexico, where Arline follows him later to a hospital in Albuquerque, New Mexico, where she dies. The film ends with Feynman crying at the sight of the red dress Arline had pointed out.

== Cast ==
- Matthew Broderick as Richard Feynman
  - Jeffrey Force as Young Richard Feynman
- Patricia Arquette as Arline Greenbaum, Feynman's first wife
- Peter Riegert as Melville "Mel" Feynman, Feynman's father
- Željko Ivanek as Bill Price
- Dori Brenner as Tutti Feynman
- Peter Michael Goetz as Dr. Murray Gell-Mann
- Joyce Van Patten as Aunt Ruth
- James LeGros as John Archibald Wheeler, Thesis advisor at Princeton
- David Drew Gallagher as Harold
- Raffi Di Blasio as Robert
- Josh Keaton as David
- James Hong as Abacus Adder
- Emerson Tran as Kid
- Kristin Dattilo as Joan Feynman, Sister of Richard Feynman
  - Melissa DeLizia as Young Joan Feynman
- John Hammil as County Dr. #1
- Mary Pat Gleason as County Dr. #2
- Helene Moore as County Nurse #1
- Jack Lindine as Mr. Greenbaum, Arline's father
- Horton Foote Jr. as Neighborhood Doctor
- Mary Kay Wulf as Aunt Rose
- Laurence Haddon as Family Doctor
- Tom Kurlander as Driver
- Mark Burnham as Passenger #1
- Googy Gress as Passenger #2
- Joshua Goldin as Passenger #3
- Erich Anderson as Gil
- Matt Mulhern as Gate Guard
- Drew Ebersole as Calculator Kid #1
- Damion Scheller as Calculator Kid #2
- Joshua Malina as Calculator Kid #3
- Demetrius Navarro as Calculator Kid #4
- John Patterson as Stan Ivanek
- Cosimo Sherman as Garo
- Geoffrey Nauffts as Rob
- David Barrera as Chepa
- Patrick James Clarke as Strong Fellow
- Kirk Fox as Mechanic
- Marianne Muellerleile as Nurse Gracie
- Michelle Feynman as Sewing Girl on Train
- Bill Bolender as Isidor Isaac Rabi
- Corbitt Smith as Henry

== Production ==
The film follows the 1988 book What Do You Care What Other People Think? fairly closely in terms of the stories told.

In 1994, Broderick said of the project, "The obvious way to structure a film about Feynman would be to open with the Challenger disaster: The crazy old genius comes along and figures everything out, then he drifts into a reverie along the lines of 'A long time ago I met a girl.. . .' We didn't do that, because we want this to be an intimate movie and thought focusing on one period of his life that includes the invention of the bomb and the death of his first wife was enough."

Broderick later said in 1997, "It was a difficult job and took four years from start to finish."

== Reception ==
On Rotten Tomatoes the film has a 62% rating based on reviews from 13 critics. Roger Ebert awarded the film three out of four stars. Leonard Maltin awarded it two and a half stars.

Emanuel Levy of Variety gave the film a negative review and described the film as "a flawed movie that suffers from a weak performance by Patricia Arquette." John Krewson of The A.V. Club gave it a positive review and wrote that "saps, scientific or otherwise, will enjoy it."

== See also ==
- List of films about mathematicians
