= Donald Kutyna =

United States Air Force general

Donald J. Kutyna
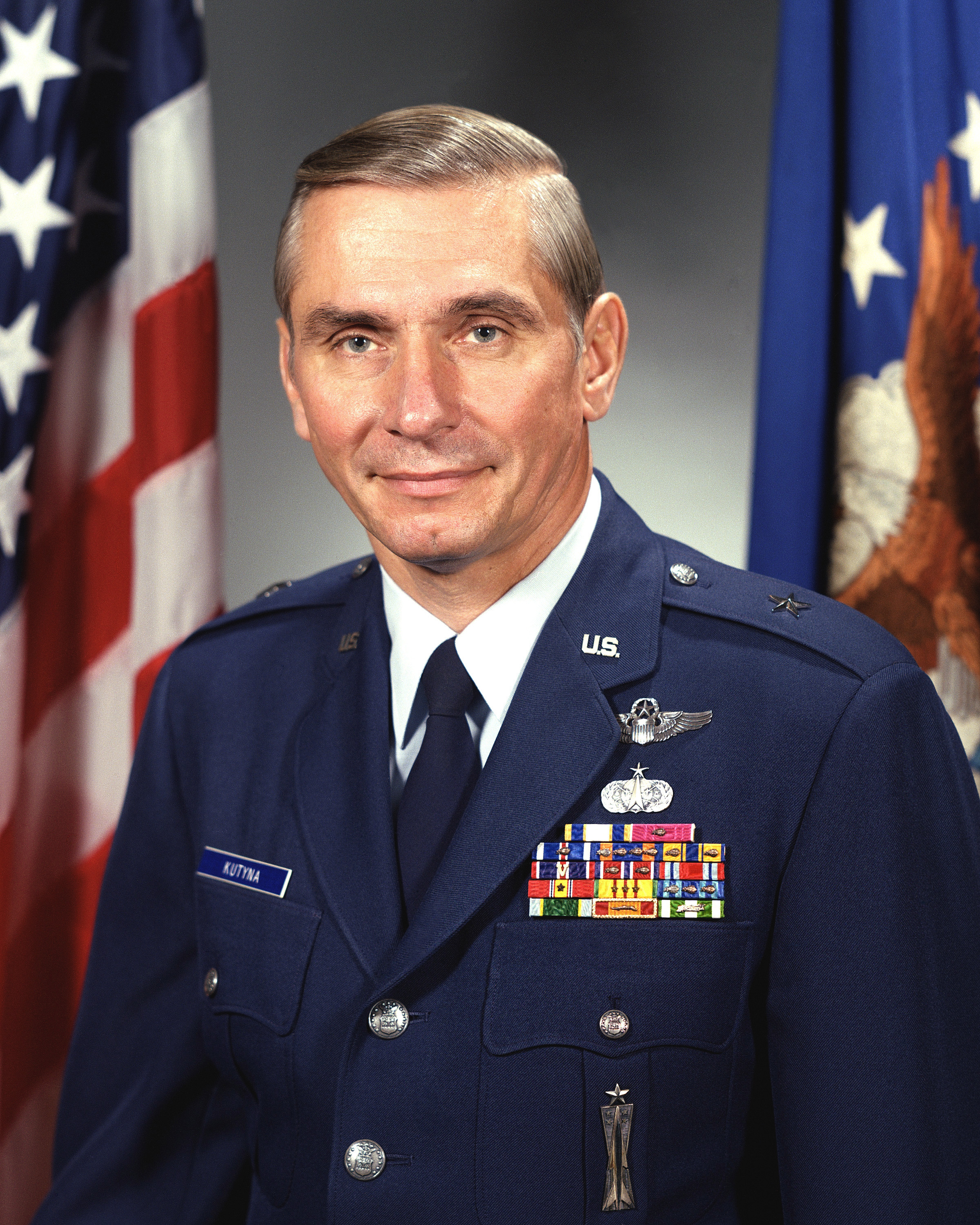
- Brigadier General Donald J. Kutyna in 1985
- Born: December 6, 1933 (age 92); Chicago, Illinois
- Military career
- Allegiance: United States
- Branch: United States Air Force
- Service years: 1957–1992
- Rank: General
- Commands: North American Aerospace Defense Command; United States Space Command; Air Force Space Command
- Conflicts: Vietnam War
- Awards: Defense Distinguished Service Medal (2); Air Force Distinguished Service Medal; Legion of Merit (2); Distinguished Flying Cross (2); Air Medal (9)
- Other work: Rogers Commission Member

General Donald Joseph Kutyna (/kəˈtiːnə/; born December 6, 1933) is a retired United States Air Force officer. He was commander in chief of the North American Aerospace Defense Command (NORAD) and the United States Space Command from 1990 to 1992, and commander of Air Force Space Command at Peterson Air Force Base, Colorado from 1987 to 1990.

== Early years in the Air Force ==
Kutyna attended the University of Iowa for two years and was appointed to the United States Military Academy, graduating with a Bachelor of Science degree in the Class of 1957.

Upon completing pilot training at Vance Air Force Base, Oklahoma, in September 1958, Kutyna was assigned to the 33rd Bombardment Squadron at March Air Force Base, California, serving as a B-47 combat crew commander until June 1963.

In June 1965, Kutyna graduated from the Massachusetts Institute of Technology with a Master of Science degree in aeronautics and astronautics. Afterwards he was assigned to the Aerospace Research Pilot School, Edwards Air Force Base, California, first as a student and then as a staff director, training test pilots, and astronauts for United States aviation and space programs.

From December 1969 to January 1971, Kutyna served a combat tour of duty with the 44th Tactical Fighter Squadron at Takhli Royal Thai Air Force Base, Thailand, completing 120 combat missions in the F-105 tactical fighter. Of Polish ancestry and as a pun on the glide characteristics of the F-105, Kutyna named the aircraft he flew in combat as "The Polish Glider". That aircraft is now in the Polish Aviation Museum in Kraków, Poland; various model kits of it have been manufactured.

Upon his return from Southeast Asia, Kutyna was assigned to Headquarters United States Air Force, Washington, D.C., as a development planner in the Office of the Deputy Chief of Staff for Research and Development. In June 1973, after a tour of duty with the Air Force Scientific Advisory Board, he was assigned as executive officer to the undersecretary of the Air Force.

In August 1975 Kutyna entered the Industrial College of the Armed Forces. After graduation in July 1976, he transferred to Electronic Systems Division, Hanscom Air Force Base, Massachusetts, with duty as assistant deputy for international programs. He then served as program manager for foreign military sales of the E-3A Airborne Warning and Control System aircraft, and later became assistant program director for the overall E-3A program.

In June 1980 Kutyna was appointed deputy for surveillance and control systems, responsible for the development and acquisition of the sensors and command centers used today by NORAD, and by the United States Space Command, in the satisfaction of their world-wide missions.

== Los Angeles Air Force Base and Space Shuttle program ==
In June 1982, Kutyna became deputy commander for space launch and control systems at Space Division, Air Force Systems Command, Los Angeles Air Force Station, California. In this position he managed the Department of Defense Space Shuttle program, including the design and construction of the West Coast space shuttle launch site at Vandenberg Air Force Base, California; the acquisition of space shuttle upper stage boosters; and the operational aspects of launching military payloads on the shuttle.

Other responsibilities encompassed the development, acquisition and launch support of all Air Force expendable launch vehicles, including the Titan and Atlas space boosters and the Titan IV heavy lift launch vehicle, which provides a capability equivalent to the space shuttle. His programs for control of space missions encompassed the operations and upgrade of the Air Force satellite control network, and development of Air Force Space Command's Consolidated Space Operations Center, Falcon Air Force Station, Colorado. In June 1984 Kutyna became director of space systems and command, control and communications, Office of the Deputy Chief of Staff, Research, Development and Acquisition, at Air Force headquarters.

Kutyna is perhaps most famous for his aid in several investigations of NASA launch failures, especially his membership on the Rogers Commission investigating the loss of the Space Shuttle Challenger. He was particularly critical of NASA's decision to allow the shuttle to keep flying despite knowledge of the catastrophic O-ring flaw that ultimately led to the disaster. He likened this situation to an airline allowing a plane to fly despite evidence that one of its wings was about to fall off. While serving, he befriended fellow panelist Richard Feynman, who later described their partnership in his humorous memoir What Do You Care What Other People Think?. The partnership of Kutyna and Feynman was critical in the discovery and publication of the cause of the Challenger disaster: Kutyna told Feynman about how he was repairing his car and discovered that some seals failed due to low temperatures that morning. That inspired Feynman, who discovered the truth about O-ring weakness: they lack elasticity when at or below a temperature of 32 °F (0 °C) degrees, such as the morning of the accident. Feynman knew an astronaut had given Kutyna the crucial piece of information that led to his O-Ring insight; Kutyna later revealed that it was Sally Ride, a fellow member of the investigation commission but still a NASA employee at the time:

One day [early in the investigation] Sally Ride and I were walking together. She was on my right side and was looking straight ahead. She opened up her notebook and with her left hand, still looking straight ahead, gave me a piece of paper. Didn't say a single word. I look at the piece of paper. It's a NASA document. It's got two columns on it. The first column is temperature, the second column is resiliency of O-rings as a function of temperature. It shows that they get stiff when it gets cold. Sally and I were really good buddies. She figured she could trust me to give me that piece of paper and not implicate her or the people at NASA who gave it to her, because they could all get fired. I wondered how I could introduce this information Sally had given me. So I had Feynman at my house for dinner. I have a 1973 Opel GT, a really cute car. We went out to the garage, and I'm bragging about the car, but he could care less about cars. I had taken the carburetor out. And Feynman said, "What's this?" And I said, "Oh, just a carburetor. I'm cleaning it." Then I said, "Professor, these carburetors have O-rings in them. And when it gets cold, they leak. Do you suppose that has anything to do with our situation?" He did not say a word. We finished the night, and the next Tuesday, at the first public meeting, is when he did his O-ring demonstration ... I never talked with Sally about it later ... I kept it a secret that she had given me that piece of paper until she died [in 2012].

The events of the Challenger investigation were dramatized in a 2013 TV film The Challenger Disaster, where Kutyna was portrayed by Bruce Greenwood.

Kutyna returned to Los Angeles Air Force Station as vice commander of Space Division in June 1986, overseeing all space system acquisitions, with particular emphasis on programs associated with the Strategic Defense Initiative.

== Air Force Space Command ==
In November 1987 Kutyna became commander of the Air Force Space Command, the newest major command in the Air Force, with headquarters at Peterson Air Force Base. General Kutyna's forces conducted missile warning, space surveillance and satellite control operations at 46 locations around the world. He assumed command of the North American Aerospace Defense Command and the United States Space Command in April 1990.

Kutyna was promoted to General on April 1, 1990, with same date of rank, and retired June 30, 1992.

== Awards and decorations ==
Kutyna was a command pilot with more than 4,500 flying hours in 25 different fighters and bombers. His military awards and decorations include the Defense Distinguished Service Medal with oak leaf cluster, Air Force Distinguished Service Medal, Legion of Merit with oak leaf cluster, Distinguished Flying Cross with oak leaf cluster, Air Medal with eight oak leaf clusters, and Air Force Commendation Medal with two oak leaf clusters.

United States Air Force Command Pilot Badge
Defense Distinguished Service Medal with bronze oak leaf cluster	Air Force Distinguished Service Medal	Legion of Merit with bronze oak leaf cluster
Distinguished Flying Cross with bronze oak leaf cluster	Air Medal with one silver and three bronze oak leaf clusters	Air Force Commendation Medal with two bronze oak leaf clusters
Air Force Outstanding Unit Award with Valor device	Air Force Organizational Excellence Award with two bronze oak leaf clusters	Combat Readiness Medal
National Defense Service Medal with bronze service star	Vietnam Service Medal with three bronze campaign stars	Air Force Longevity Service Award with one silver and two bronze oak leaf clusters
Small Arms Expert Marksmanship Ribbon	Vietnam Gallantry Cross Unit Citation	Vietnam Campaign Medal

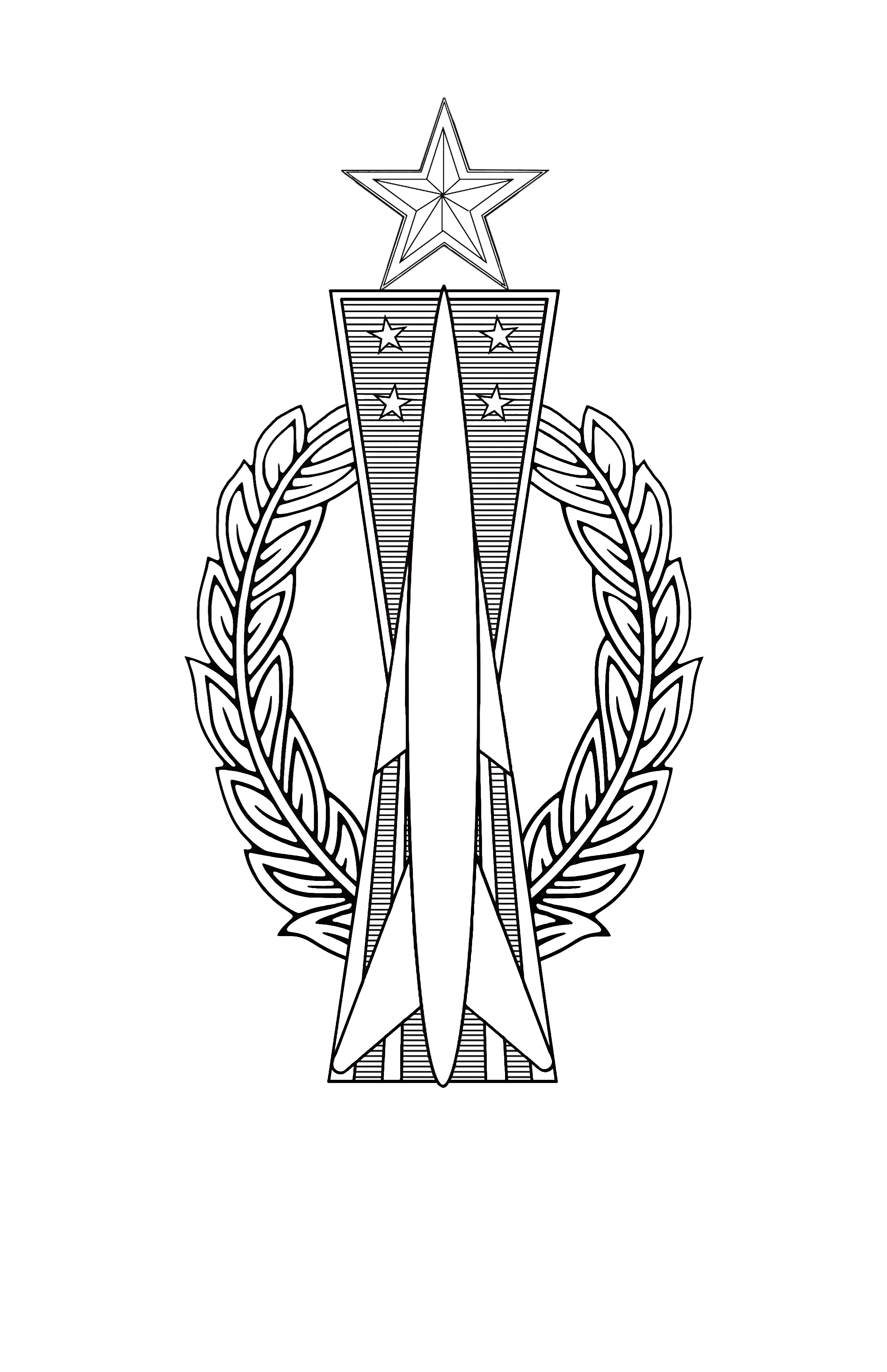

Senior Missile Operator Badge

Kutyna received the National Geographic Society's General Thomas D. White U.S. Air Force Space Trophy in June 1987, an award given to the individual who has made the most outstanding contribution to the nation's progress in space.

== Sources ==
Aleksandra Ziolkowska-Boehm (2004) [2000]. "Chapter: Reaching for the Stars - Donald J.Kutyna, Introduction: Major General Bruce J.Legge". The Roots Are Polish. Toronto: Canadian-Polish Institute. ISBN 0-920517-05-6.
