= The Challenger Disaster =

2013 television film by James Hawes

- Also known as: The Challenger
- Genre: Drama
- Based on: What Do You Care What Other People Think? by; Richard Feynman; Gwyneth Feynman; Ralph Leighton; Truth, Lies and O-Rings by; Allan J. McDonald; James R. Hansen
- Written by: Kate Gartside
- Directed by: James Hawes
- Starring: Joanne Whalley; William Hurt; Bruce Greenwood; Kevin McNally; Eve Best; Brian Dennehy
- Music by: Christopher Letcher
- Countries of origin: United States; United Kingdom
- Original language: English

Production
- Cinematography: Lukas Strebel
- Editor: Peter Christelis
- Running time: 89 minutes
- Production companies: BBC Films; Erstweit Medien; Moonlighting Films; Pictureshow Productions; Science Channel; Open University

Original release
- Network: BBC2
- Release: 12 May 2013

The Challenger (US title: The Challenger Disaster) is a 2013 TV movie starring William Hurt about Richard Feynman's investigation into the 1986 Space Shuttle Challenger disaster. The film was co-produced by the BBC, the Science Channel, and Open University, and it premiered on 12 May 2013 on BBC2.

It is based on two books What Do You Care What Other People Think? (1988) and Truth, Lies and O-Rings.

The film follows Feynman (William Hurt) as he attempts to expose the truth in the disaster.

It aired in the U.S. on the Discovery Channel and the Science Channel on 16 November 2013.

== Plot ==
Dr. Richard Feynman, a physics professor at Caltech, gives a guest lecture to students, lamenting on both the power and limitations of science. While driving home, he hears on the radio that the Space Shuttle Challenger exploded on takeoff and that it is very likely the astronauts perished in the accident. Several days later, he receives a phone call from a former student of his, who asks him to sit on the Presidential Commission to determine what caused the accident. Feynman, a vocal opponent of the political games politicians and government play, initially is unsure if he should participate; however, his wife Gwen encourages him that he cannot pass up a puzzle like this, and must sit on the inquiry and figure out what really happened.

Feynman arrives in Washington and quickly realizes the chairman William Rogers wants to protect NASA and may not be seeking the real truth of what caused the accident. Unbeknownst to Feynman, the commission will be in recess for five days before any official work begins. During this time he visits various NASA production facilities on his own to learn and attempt to determine the cause of the accident. There he finds a culture lacking in truth and reality as NASA employees are afraid to openly discuss known issues with the shuttle program out of fear. As a maverick investigator, Feynman discovers many other known issues through research and a surreptitious note that the loss of a shuttle was expected. Feynman's only ally on the commission, General Donald J. Kutyna, attempts to leak information to Feynman as he has a secret source within NASA who knows what really happened.

As Feynman draws closer to the truth his health dramatically changes as he discovers he has cancer. Realizing how important the truth is, he returns to Washington to divulge the reason for the shuttle's failure. In a televised broadcast of the commission hearing, having discovered that the O-rings were the culprit for the explosion, he demonstrates that due to cold temperatures, the O-ring could not expand and caused the explosion. Unable to hide from these findings, the commission issues its report to President Ronald Reagan with Feynman including an appendix with his own findings, citing "for a successful technology, reality must take precedence over public relations, for nature cannot be fooled." The film closes with a montage of several key members in the film and their contributions.

== Reception ==
The movie scored an overall approval rating of 92% on Rotten Tomatoes.

Neil Genzlinger of The New York Times writes "The Challenger investigation story doesn’t have quite the level of malfeasance or the cloak-and-dagger undertones of other movies about real-life government or business debacles. But it still makes for an absorbing tale, one that seems well timed for our current moment of bungled websites, unrestrained eavesdropping and public skepticism."

Michael Starr of The New York Post writes "It’s both a learning experience and an emotional reminder of what can go wrong in that gray area separating man and machine."

Hank Stuever of The Washington Post writes "The film is an appropriately somber and smoothly told account of the Washington politics and cross-agency obfuscation that nearly derailed the commission's investigation into the disaster, which claimed the lives of seven astronauts, including schoolteacher Christa McAuliffe".

== Cast ==
- William Hurt as Dr. Richard Feynman
- Joanne Whalley as Gweneth Feynman
- Bruce Greenwood as General Donald Kutyna
- Brian Dennehy as Chairman William Rogers
- Eve Best as Dr. Sally Ride
- Henry Goodman as Dr. Weiss
- Kevin McNally as Lawrence Mulloy
- Sean Michael as Judson Lovingood

== See also ==
- Rogers Commission Report
- Challenger, 1990 film
- Challenger: The Final Flight, 2020 documentary miniseries
