= The Character of Physical Law =

Book by Richard Feynman

- First edition
- Author: Richard Feynman
- Language: English
- Subject: Physics
- Genre: Non-fiction
- Published: 1965 (BBC)
- Publication place: United States
- Pages: 173
- ISBN: 0679601279
- LC Class: QC71 .F44
- Website: feynmanlectures.caltech.edu/messenger.html

The Character of Physical Law is a series of seven lectures by physicist Richard Feynman concerning the nature of the laws of physics. Feynman delivered the lectures in 1964 at Cornell University, as part of the Messenger Lectures series. The BBC recorded the lectures and published a book under the same title the following year; Cornell published the BBC's recordings online in September 2015.In 2017 MIT Press published, with a new foreword by Frank Wilczek, a paperback reprint of the 1965 book.

== Topics ==
The lectures covered the following topics:

1. The law of gravitation, an example of physical law
2. The relation of mathematics and physics
3. The great conservation principles
4. Symmetry in physical law
5. The distinction of past and future
6. Probability and uncertainty – the quantum mechanical view of nature
7. Seeking new laws

== Reception ==
Critical reception has been positive. The journal The Physics Teacher, in recommending it to both scientists and non-scientists alike, gave The Character of Physical Law a favorable review, writing that although the book was initially intended to supplement the recordings, it was "complete in itself and will appeal to a far wider audience".

== Selections ==
- "In general we look for a new law by the following process. First we guess it." (Feynman 1965, p. 156)

== See also ==
- QED: The Strange Theory of Light and Matter
- The Feynman Lectures on Physics
