= Bethe–Feynman formula =

Fission bomb yield formula

The Bethe–Feynman efficiency formula, a simple method for calculating the yield of a fission bomb, was first derived in 1943 after development in 1942. Aspects of the formula are speculated to be secret restricted data.

== Related formula ==
- a = internal energy per gram
- b = growth rate
- c = sphere radius

$a \approx (bc)^2 f$

A numerical coefficient would then be included to create the Bethe–Feynman formula—increasing accuracy by more than an order of magnitude.

$E_ff = \left( \frac{E_2}{\gamma-1} \right) \cdot \alpha_{max}^2 \cdot R_{crit}^2 \cdot \left(\frac{\delta}{1-\delta}\right) \cdot \left(\frac{2 + 3\delta}{2} \right)$

where γ is the thermodynamic exponent of a photon gas, E_{2} is the prompt energy density of the fuel, α is V_{n} (neutron velocity) / λ_{mfp_{tot}} (total reaction mean free path), R_{crit} is the critical radius and 𝛿 is the excess supercritical radius (R_{core} - R_{crit}) / R_{crit}.

== See also ==
- Richard Feynman
- Hans Bethe
- Robert Serber
