= Richard Feynman =

American theoretical physicist (1918–1988)

Richard P. Feynman
- Feynman c. 1965
- Born: Richard Phillips Feynman; May 11, 1918; New York City, U.S.
- Died: February 15, 1988 (aged 69); Los Angeles, California, U.S.
- Resting place: Mountain View Cemetery and Mausoleum
- Education: Massachusetts Institute of Technology (SB); Princeton University (PhD)
- Known for: Manhattan Project; Acoustic wave equation; Bethe–Feynman formula; Feynman checkerboard; Feynman diagrams; Feynman gauge; Feynman–Kac formula; Feynman parametrization; Feynman point; Feynman propagator; Feynman slash notation; Feynman sprinkler; Hellmann–Feynman theorem; Heaviside-Feynman formula; V−A theory; Brownian ratchet; Feynman–Stueckelberg interpretation; Nanotechnology; One-electron universe; Parton; Path integral formulation; Playing the bongos; Quantum cellular automata; Quantum computing; Quantum dissipation; Quantum electrodynamics; Quantum hydrodynamics; Quantum logic gates; Quantum turbulence; Resummation; Rogers Commission; Shaft passer; Sticky bead argument; Synthetic molecular motor; The Feynman Lectures on Physics; Universal quantum simulator; Vortex ring model; Wheeler–Feynman absorber theory; Variational perturbation theory
- Spouses: Arline Greenbaum (m. 1942; died 1945) Mary Louise Bell (m. 1952; div. 1958) Gweneth Howarth (m. 1960)
- Children: 2
- Relatives: Joan Feynman (sister); Charles Hirshberg (nephew)
- Awards: Albert Einstein Award (1954); E. O. Lawrence Award (1962); Nobel Prize in Physics (1965); Foreign Member of the Royal Society (1965); Oersted Medal (1972); National Medal of Science (1979)
- Scientific career
- Fields: Theoretical physics
- Workplaces: Cornell University; California Institute of Technology
- Thesis: The Principle of Least Action in Quantum Mechanics (1942)
- Doctoral advisor: John Archibald Wheeler
- Doctoral students: James M. Bardeen; Laurie Mark Brown; Michael Cohen; Thomas Curtright; Albert Hibbs; Giovanni Rossi Lomanitz; George Zweig
- Other notable students: Robert Barro; Douglas D. Osheroff; Paul J. Steinhardt; Stephen Wolfram

Richard Phillips Feynman (/ˈfaɪnmən/; May 11, 1918 – February 15, 1988) was an American theoretical physicist. He shared the 1965 Nobel Prize in Physics with Julian Schwinger and Shin'ichirō Tomonaga "for their fundamental work in quantum electrodynamics (QED), with deep-ploughing consequences for the physics of elementary particles". He is also known for his work in the path integral formulation of quantum mechanics, the theory of the physics of the superfluidity of supercooled liquid helium, and the parton model. Feynman developed a pictorial representation scheme for the mathematical expressions describing the behavior of subatomic particles, which later became known as Feynman diagrams and remains widely used.

He assisted in the development of the atomic bomb during World War II and became known to the wider public in the 1980s as a member of the Rogers Commission, the panel that investigated the Space Shuttle Challenger disaster. Along with his work in theoretical physics, Feynman has been credited with having pioneered the field of quantum computing and introducing the concept of nanotechnology. He held the Richard C. Tolman professorship in theoretical physics at the California Institute of Technology. In a 1999 poll of 130 leading physicists worldwide by the British journal Physics World, he was ranked the seventh-greatest physicist of all time.

Feynman was a keen physics popularizer through books and lectures, including a talk on top-down nanotechnology, "There's Plenty of Room at the Bottom" (1959) and his undergraduate lectures, The Feynman Lectures on Physics (1961–1964). He delivered lectures for lay audiences, recorded in The Character of Physical Law (1965) and QED: The Strange Theory of Light and Matter (1985). Feynman also became known through Ralph Leighton's collections of his anecdotes, Surely You're Joking, Mr. Feynman! (1985) and What Do You Care What Other People Think? (1988). Leighton covered his dream of traveling to Tannu Tuva in Tuva or Bust!. He has been the subject of several biographies, starting with Genius: The Life and Science of Richard Feynman by James Gleick.

== Early life ==
Richard Phillips Feynman was born on May 11, 1918, in Queens, New York City, to Lucille (née Phillips), a homemaker, and Melville Arthur Feynman, a sales manager for uniforms. Feynman's father was born into a Jewish family in Minsk, Russian Empire, and immigrated with his parents to the United States at the age of five. Feynman's mother was born in the United States into a Jewish family. Lucille's father had emigrated from Poland, and her mother also came from a family of Polish immigrants. She trained as a primary school teacher but married Melville in 1917, before taking up a profession. Richard was a late talker and did not speak until after his third birthday. As an adult, he spoke with a New York accent strong enough to be perceived as an affectation or exaggeration, so much so that his friends Wolfgang Pauli and Hans Bethe once commented that Feynman spoke like a "bum".

The young Feynman was heavily influenced by his father, who encouraged him to ask questions to challenge orthodox thinking, and who was always ready to teach Feynman something new. From his mother, he gained the sense of humor that he had throughout his life. As a child, he had a talent for engineering, maintained an experimental laboratory in his home, and delighted in repairing radios. This radio repairing was probably the first job Feynman had, and during this time he showed early signs of an aptitude for his later career in theoretical physics, when he would analyze the issues theoretically and arrive at the solutions. When he was in grade school, he created a home burglar alarm system while his parents were out for the day running errands.

When Richard was five, his mother gave birth to a younger brother, Henry Phillips, who died at age four weeks. Four years later, Richard's sister Joan was born and the family moved to Far Rockaway, Queens. Though separated by nine years, Joan and Richard were close, and they both shared a curiosity about the world. Though their mother thought women lacked the capacity to understand such things, Richard encouraged Joan's interest in astronomy, taking her to see the aurora borealis in Far Rockaway. As an astrophysicist, Joan would help to explain what caused the northern lights.

=== Religion ===
Feynman's parents were both from Jewish families, and his family went to the synagogue every Friday. However, by his youth, Feynman described himself as an "avowed atheist". Many years later, in a letter to Tina Levitan, declining a request for information for her book on Jewish Nobel Prize winners, he stated, "To select, for approbation the peculiar elements that come from some supposedly Jewish heredity is to open the door to all kinds of nonsense on racial theory", adding, "at thirteen I was not only converted to other religious views, but I also stopped believing that the Jewish people are in any way 'the chosen people'".

Later in life, during a visit to the Jewish Theological Seminary, Feynman encountered the Talmud for the first time. He saw that it contained the original text in a little square on each page, and surrounding it were commentaries written over time by different people. In this way, the Talmud had evolved, and everything that was discussed was carefully recorded. Despite being impressed, Feynman was disappointed with the lack of interest in nature and the outside world expressed by the rabbis, who cared about only those questions which arise from the Talmud.

== Education ==
Feynman attended Far Rockaway High School, which was also attended by fellow Nobel laureates Burton Richter and Baruch Samuel Blumberg. Upon starting high school, Feynman was quickly promoted to a higher math class. An IQ test administered in high school estimated his IQ at 125—high but "merely respectable", according to biographer James Gleick. His sister Joan, who scored one point higher, later jokingly claimed to an interviewer that she was smarter. Years later he declined to join Mensa International, saying that his IQ was too low.

When Feynman was 15, he taught himself trigonometry, advanced algebra, infinite series, analytic geometry, and both differential and integral calculus. Before entering college, he was experimenting with mathematical topics such as the half-derivative using his own notation. He created special symbols for logarithm, sine, cosine and tangent functions so they did not look like three variables multiplied together, and for the derivative, to remove the temptation of canceling out the $d$s in $d/dx$. A member of the Arista Honor Society, in his last year in high school he won the New York University Math Championship. His habit of direct characterization sometimes rattled more conventional thinkers; for example, one of his questions, when learning feline anatomy, was "Do you have a map of the cat?" (referring to an anatomical chart).

Feynman applied to Columbia University but was not accepted because of its quota for the number of Jews admitted. Instead, he attended the Massachusetts Institute of Technology, where he joined the Pi Lambda Phi fraternity. Although he originally majored in mathematics, he later switched to electrical engineering, as he considered mathematics to be too abstract. Noticing that he "had gone too far" in pivoting away from abstraction, he then switched to physics, which he claimed was "somewhere in between" (providing an optimal balance between practicality and abstraction). As an undergraduate, he published two papers in the Physical Review. One of these, which was co-written with Manuel Vallarta, was titled "The Scattering of Cosmic Rays by the Stars of a Galaxy".

Vallarta let his student in on a secret of mentor-protégé publishing: the senior scientist's name comes first. Feynman had his revenge a few years later, when Heisenberg concluded an entire book on cosmic rays with the phrase: "such an effect is not to be expected according to Vallarta and Feynman". When they next met, Feynman asked gleefully whether Vallarta had seen Heisenberg's book. Vallarta knew why Feynman was grinning. "Yes," he replied. "You're the last word in cosmic rays."

The other was his senior thesis, on "Forces in Molecules", based on a topic assigned by John C. Slater, who was sufficiently impressed by the paper to have it published. Its main result is known as the Hellmann–Feynman theorem.

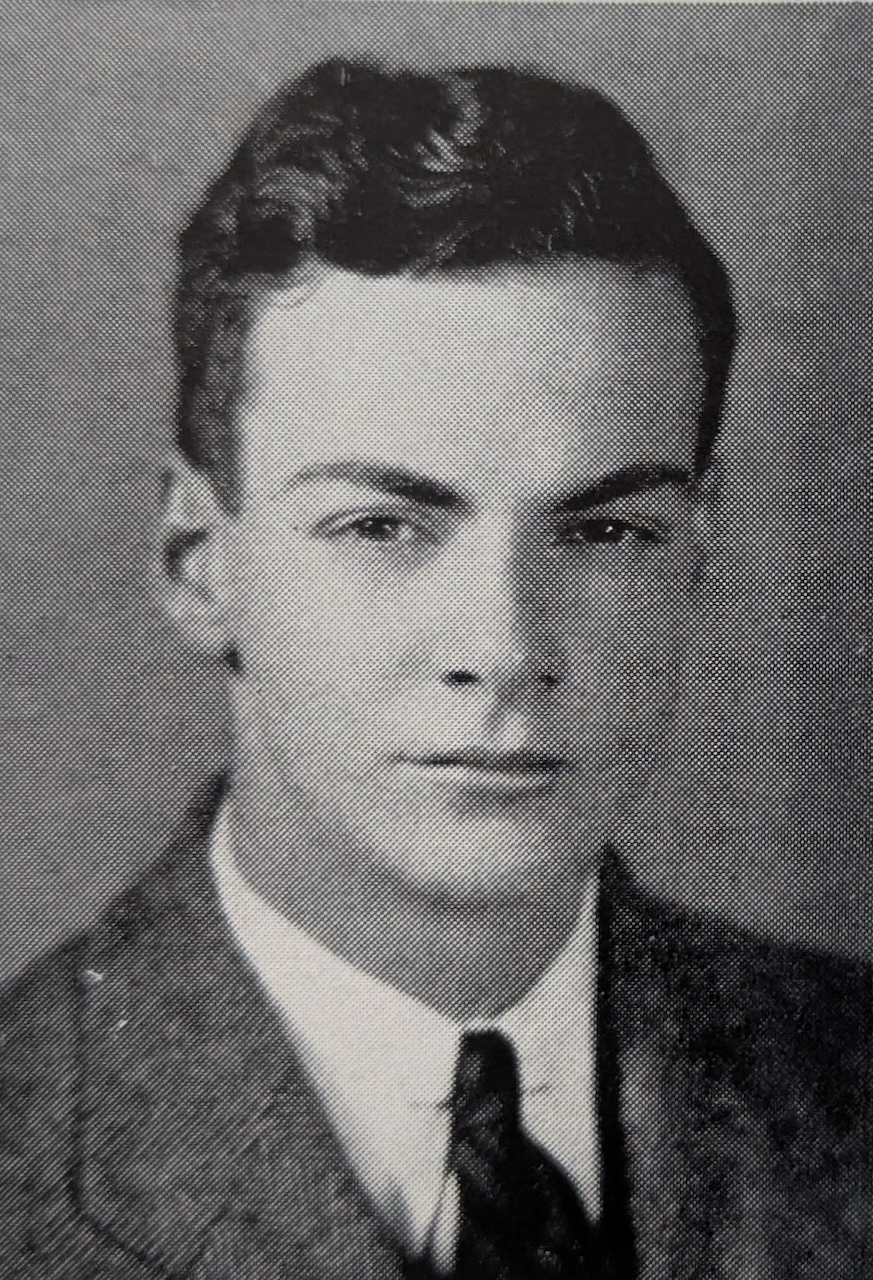
MIT yearbook portrait (1939)

In 1939, Feynman received a bachelor's degree and was named a Putnam Fellow. He attained a perfect score on the graduate school entrance exams to Princeton University in physics—an unprecedented feat—and an outstanding score in mathematics, but did poorly on the history and English portions. The head of the physics department there, Henry D. Smyth, had another concern, writing to Philip M. Morse to ask: "Is Feynman Jewish? We have no definite rule against Jews but have to keep their proportion in our department reasonably small because of the difficulty of placing them." Morse conceded that Feynman was indeed Jewish, but reassured Smyth that Feynman's "physiognomy and manner, however, show no trace of this characteristic".

Attendees at Feynman's first seminar, which was on the classical version of the Wheeler–Feynman absorber theory, included Albert Einstein, Wolfgang Pauli, and John von Neumann. Pauli made the prescient comment that the theory would be extremely difficult to quantize, and Einstein said that one might try to apply this method to gravity in general relativity, which Sir Fred Hoyle and Jayant Narlikar did much later as the Hoyle–Narlikar theory of gravity. Feynman received a PhD from Princeton in 1942; his thesis advisor was John Archibald Wheeler. In his doctoral thesis titled "The Principle of Least Action in Quantum Mechanics", Feynman applied the principle of stationary action to problems of quantum mechanics, inspired by a desire to quantize the Wheeler–Feynman absorber theory of electrodynamics, and laid the groundwork for the path integral formulation and Feynman diagrams. A key insight was that positrons behaved like electrons moving backwards in time. James Gleick wrote:

This was Richard Feynman nearing the crest of his powers. At twenty-three ... there may now have been no physicist on earth who could match his exuberant command over the native materials of theoretical science. It was not just a facility at mathematics (though it had become clear ... that the mathematical machinery emerging in the Wheeler–Feynman collaboration was beyond Wheeler's own ability). Feynman seemed to possess a frightening ease with the substance behind the equations, like Einstein at the same age, like the Soviet physicist Lev Landau—but few others.

One of the conditions of Feynman's scholarship to Princeton was that he could not be married; nevertheless, he continued to see his high school sweetheart, Arline Greenbaum, and was determined to marry her once he had been awarded his PhD despite the knowledge that she was seriously ill with tuberculosis. This was an incurable disease at the time, and she was not expected to live more than two years. On June 29, 1942, they took the ferry to Staten Island, where they were married in the city office. The ceremony was attended by neither family nor friends and was witnessed by a pair of strangers. Feynman could kiss Arline only on the cheek. After the ceremony he took her to Deborah Hospital, where he visited her on weekends.

== Manhattan Project ==
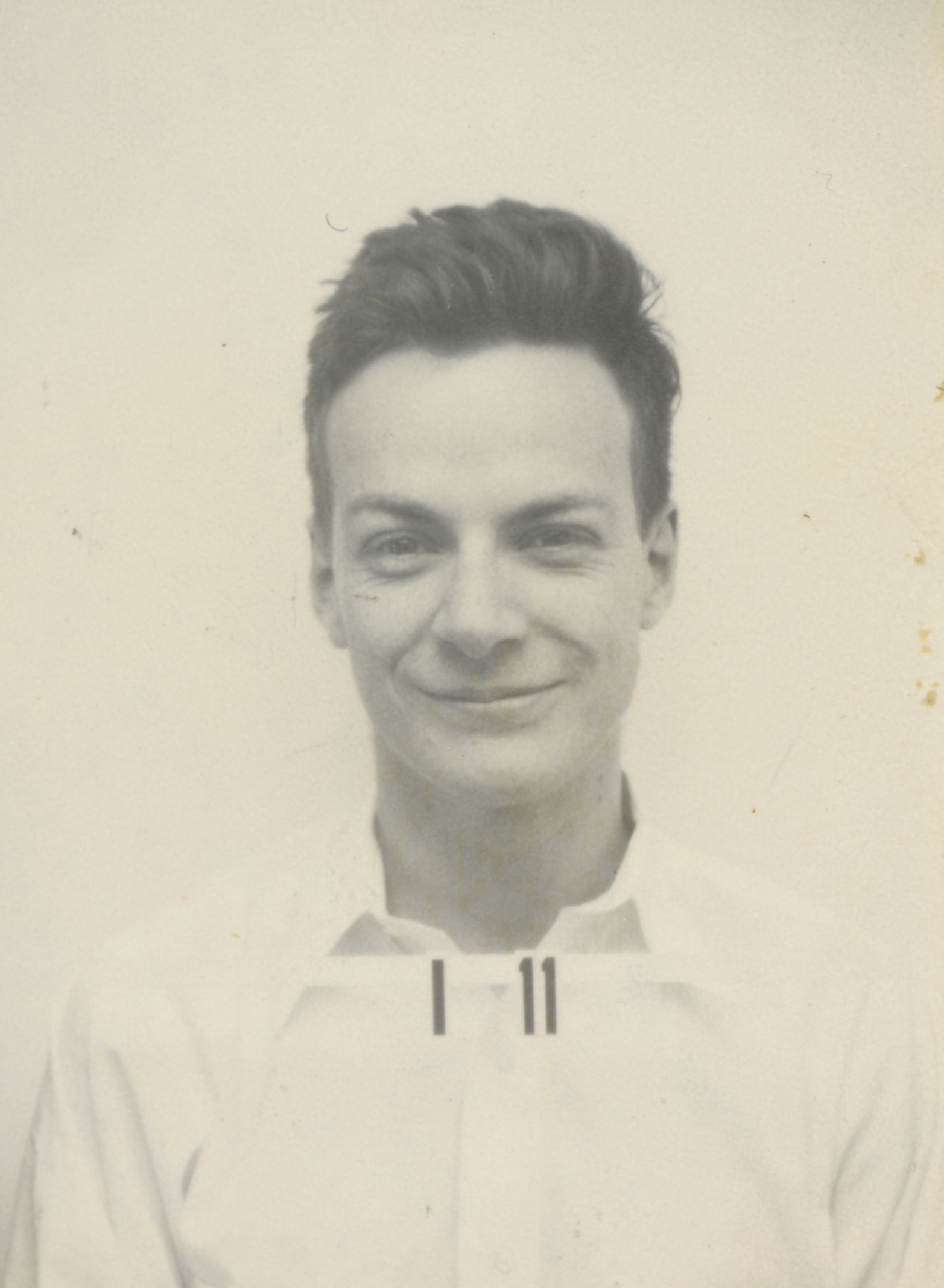
Feynman's Los Alamos ID badge

In 1941, with World War II occurring in Europe but the United States not yet at war, Feynman spent the summer working on ballistics problems at the Frankford Arsenal in Pennsylvania. After the attack on Pearl Harbor brought the United States into the war, Feynman was recruited by Robert R. Wilson, who was working on means to produce enriched uranium for use in an atomic bomb, as part of what would become the Manhattan Project. At the time, Feynman had not earned a graduate degree. Wilson's team at Princeton was working on a device called an isotron, intended to electromagnetically separate uranium-235 from uranium-238. This was done in a quite different manner from that used by the calutron that was under development by a team under Wilson's former mentor, Ernest O. Lawrence, at the Radiation Laboratory of the University of California. On paper, the isotron was many times more efficient than the calutron, but Feynman and Paul Olum struggled to determine whether it was practical. Ultimately, on Lawrence's recommendation, the isotron project was abandoned.

At this juncture, in early 1943, Robert Oppenheimer was establishing the Los Alamos Laboratory, a secret laboratory on a mesa in New Mexico where atomic bombs would be designed and built. An offer was made to the Princeton team to be redeployed there. "Like a bunch of professional soldiers," Wilson later recalled, "we signed up, en masse, to go to Los Alamos." Oppenheimer recruited many young physicists, including Feynman, whom he telephoned long distance from Chicago to inform that he had found a Presbyterian sanatorium in Albuquerque, New Mexico for Arline. They were among the first to depart for New Mexico, leaving on a train on March 28, 1943. The railroad supplied Arline with a wheelchair, and Feynman paid extra for a private room for her. There they spent their wedding anniversary.

At Los Alamos, Feynman was assigned to Hans Bethe's Theoretical (T) Division, and impressed Bethe enough to be made a group leader. He and Bethe developed the Bethe–Feynman formula for calculating the yield of a fission bomb, which built upon previous work by Robert Serber. As a junior physicist, he was not central to the project. He administered the computation group of human computers in the theoretical division. With Stanley Frankel and Nicholas Metropolis, he assisted in establishing a system for using IBM punched cards for computation. He invented a new method of computing logarithms that he later used on the Connection Machine. An avid drummer, Feynman figured out how to get the machine to click in musical rhythms. Other work at Los Alamos included calculating neutron equations for the Los Alamos "Water Boiler", a small nuclear reactor, to measure how close an assembly of fissile material was to criticality. On completing this work, Feynman was sent to the Clinton Engineer Works in Oak Ridge, Tennessee, where the Manhattan Project had its uranium enrichment facilities. He aided the engineers there in devising safety procedures for material storage so that criticality accidents could be avoided, especially when enriched uranium came into contact with water, which acted as a neutron moderator. He insisted on giving the rank and file a lecture on nuclear physics so that they would realize the dangers. He explained that while any amount of unenriched uranium could be safely stored, the enriched uranium had to be carefully handled. He developed a series of safety recommendations for the various grades of enrichments. He was told that if the people at Oak Ridge gave him any difficulty with his proposals, he was to inform them that Los Alamos "could not be responsible for their safety otherwise".

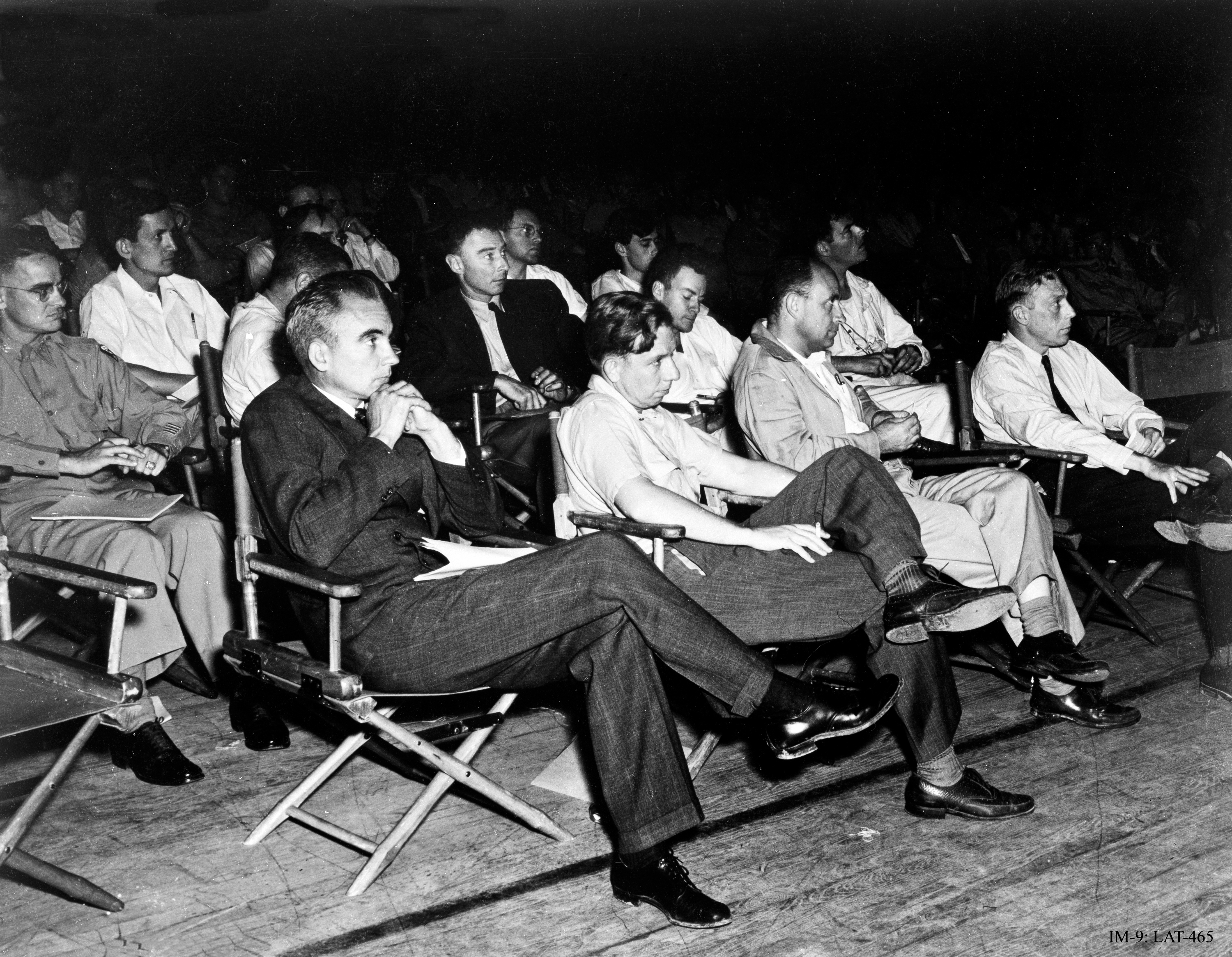
At the 1946 colloquium on the "Super" at the Los Alamos Laboratory. Feynman is in the second row, fourth from left, next to Oppenheimer.

Returning to Los Alamos, Feynman was put in charge of the group responsible for the theoretical work and calculations on the proposed uranium hydride bomb, which ultimately proved to be infeasible. He was sought out by physicist Niels Bohr for one-on-one discussions. He later discovered the reason: most of the other physicists were too much in awe of Bohr to argue with him. Feynman had no such inhibitions, vigorously pointing out anything he considered to be flawed in Bohr's thinking. He said he felt as much respect for Bohr as anyone else, but once anyone got him talking about physics, he would become so focused he forgot about social niceties. Perhaps because of this, Bohr never warmed to Feynman. Feynman impressed Oppenheimer, who wrote in a letter to the University of California's physics department chairman, Raymond T. Birge, in November 1943 that Feynman was "by all odds the most brilliant young physicist here, and everyone knows this."

At Los Alamos, which was isolated for security, Feynman amused himself by investigating the combination locks on the cabinets and desks of physicists. He often found that they left the lock combinations on the factory settings, wrote the combinations down, or used easily guessable combinations like dates. He found one cabinet's combination by trying numbers he thought a physicist might use (it proved to be 27–18–28 after the base of natural logarithms, e = 2.71828 ...), and found that the three filing cabinets where a colleague kept research notes all had the same combination. He left notes in the cabinets as a prank, spooking his colleague, Frederic de Hoffmann, into thinking a spy had gained access to them.

Feynman's monthly salary of $380 (equivalent to $7,000 in 2025) was about half the amount needed for his modest living expenses and Arline's medical bills, and they were forced to dip into her $3,300 (equivalent to $61,000 in 2025) in savings. On weekends he borrowed a car from his friend Klaus Fuchs to drive to Albuquerque to see Arline. Asked who at Los Alamos was most likely to be a spy, Fuchs mentioned Feynman's safe-cracking and frequent trips to Albuquerque; Fuchs himself later confessed to spying for the Soviet Union. The FBI would compile a bulky file on Feynman, particularly in view of Feynman's Q clearance.

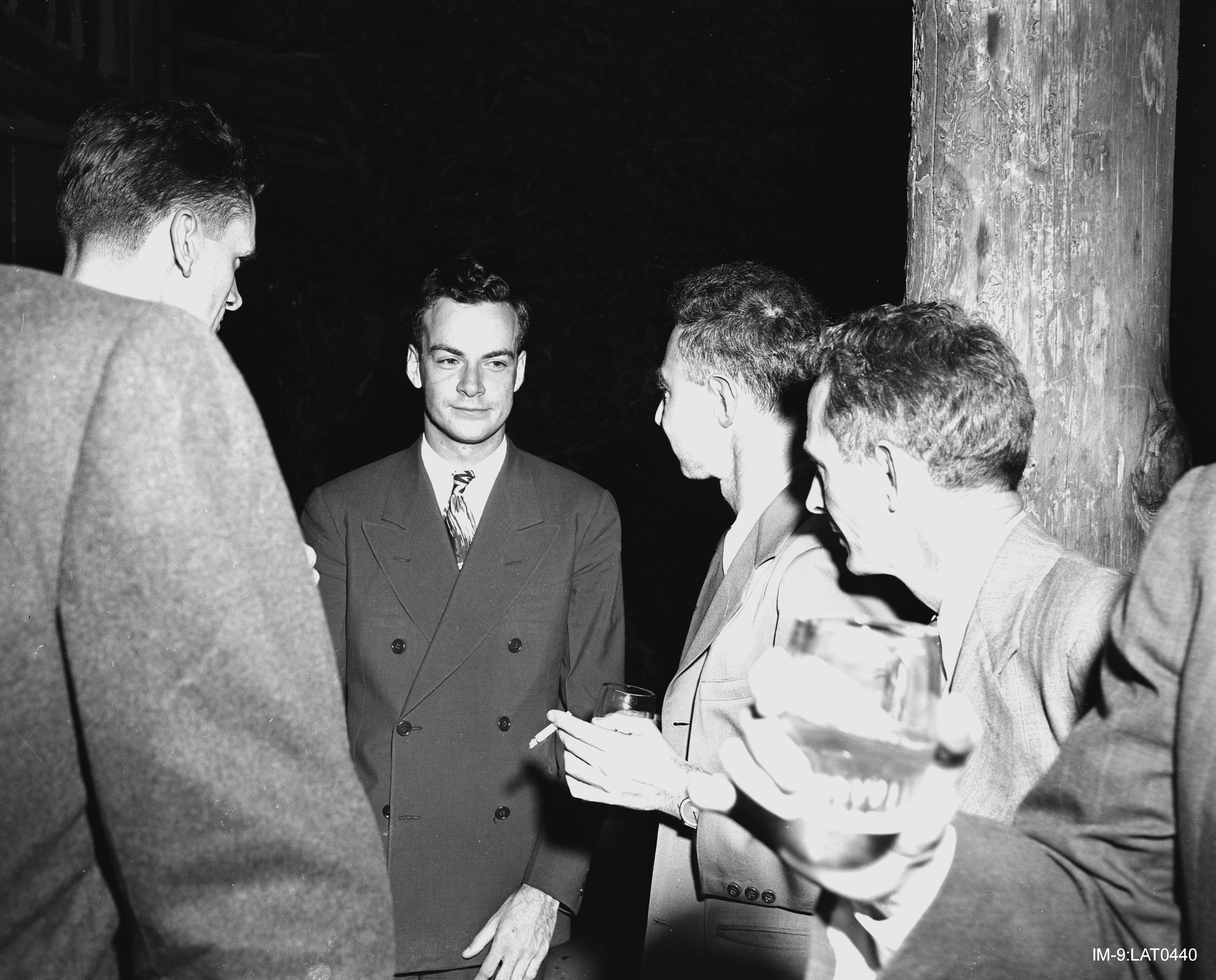
Feynman (center) with Robert Oppenheimer (immediately right of Feynman) at a Los Alamos Laboratory social function during the Manhattan Project

Informed that Arline was dying, Feynman drove to Albuquerque and sat with her for hours until she died on June 16, 1945. He then immersed himself in work on the project and was present at the Trinity nuclear test. Feynman claimed to be the only person to see the explosion without the very dark glasses or welder's lenses provided, reasoning that it was safe to look through a truck windshield, as it would screen out the harmful ultraviolet radiation. The immense brightness of the explosion made him duck to the truck's floor, where he saw a temporary "purple splotch" afterimage.

== Cornell (1945–1949) ==
Feynman nominally held an appointment at the University of Wisconsin–Madison as an assistant professor of physics, but was on unpaid leave during his involvement in the Manhattan Project. In 1945, he received a letter from Dean Mark Ingraham of the College of Letters and Science requesting his return to the university to teach in the coming academic year. His appointment was not extended when he did not commit to returning. In a talk given there several years later, Feynman quipped, "It's great to be back at the only university that ever had the good sense to fire me."

As early as October 30, 1943, Bethe had written to the chairman of the physics department of his university, Cornell, to recommend that Feynman be hired. On February 28, 1944, this was endorsed by Robert Bacher, also from Cornell, and one of the most senior scientists at Los Alamos. This led to an offer being made in August 1944, which Feynman accepted. Oppenheimer had hoped to recruit Feynman to the University of California, but Birge was reluctant. He made Feynman an offer in May 1945, but Feynman turned it down. Cornell matched its salary offer of $3,900 (equivalent to $70,000 in 2025) per annum. Feynman became one of the first of the Los Alamos Laboratory's group leaders to depart, leaving for Ithaca, New York, in October 1945.

Because Feynman was no longer working at the Los Alamos Laboratory, he was no longer exempt from the draft. At his induction physical, Army psychiatrists diagnosed Feynman as suffering from a mental illness and the Army gave him a 4-F exemption on mental grounds. His father died suddenly on October 8, 1946, and Feynman suffered from depression. On October 17, 1946, he wrote a letter to Arline, expressing his deep love and heartbreak. The letter was sealed and only opened after his death. "Please excuse my not mailing this," the letter concluded, "but I don't know your new address." Unable to focus on research problems, Feynman began tackling physics problems, not for utility, but for self-satisfaction. One of these involved analyzing the physics of a twirling, nutating disk as it is moving through the air, inspired by an incident in the cafeteria at Cornell when someone tossed a dinner plate in the air. He read the work of Sir William Rowan Hamilton on quaternions, and tried unsuccessfully to use them to formulate a relativistic theory of electrons. His work during this period, which used equations of rotation to express various spinning speeds, ultimately proved important to his Nobel Prize–winning work, yet because he felt burned out and had turned his attention to less immediately practical problems, he was surprised by the offers of professorships from other renowned universities, including the Institute for Advanced Study, the University of California, Los Angeles, and the University of California, Berkeley.

Feynman diagram of electron/positron annihilation

Feynman was not the only frustrated theoretical physicist in the early post-war years. Quantum electrodynamics suffered from infinite integrals in perturbation theory. These were clear mathematical flaws in the theory, which Feynman and Wheeler had tried, unsuccessfully, to work around. "Theoreticians", noted Murray Gell-Mann, "were in disgrace". In June 1947, leading American physicists met at the Shelter Island Conference. For Feynman, it was his "first big conference with big men ... I had never gone to one like this one in peacetime." The problems plaguing quantum electrodynamics were discussed, but the theoreticians were completely overshadowed by the achievements of the experimentalists, who reported the discovery of the Lamb shift, the measurement of the magnetic moment of the electron, and Robert Marshak's two-meson hypothesis.

Bethe took the lead from the work of Hans Kramers, and derived a renormalized non-relativistic quantum equation for the Lamb shift. The next step was to create a relativistic version. Feynman thought that he could do this, but when he went back to Bethe with his solution, it did not converge. Feynman carefully worked through the problem again, applying the path integral formulation that he had used in his thesis. Like Bethe, he made the integral finite by applying a cut-off term. The result corresponded to Bethe's version. Feynman presented his work to his peers at the Pocono Conference in 1948. It did not go well. Julian Schwinger gave a long presentation of his work in quantum electrodynamics, and Feynman then offered his version, entitled "Alternative Formulation of Quantum Electrodynamics". The unfamiliar Feynman diagrams, used for the first time, puzzled the audience. Feynman failed to get his point across, and Paul Dirac, Edward Teller and Niels Bohr all raised objections.

To Freeman Dyson, one thing at least was clear: Shin'ichirō Tomonaga, Schwinger and Feynman understood what they were talking about even if no one else did, but had not published anything. He was convinced that Feynman's formulation was easier to understand, and ultimately managed to convince Oppenheimer that this was the case. Dyson published a paper in 1949, which added new rules to Feynman's that told how to implement renormalization. Feynman was prompted to publish his ideas in the Physical Review in a series of papers over three years. His 1948 papers on "A Relativistic Cut-Off for Classical Electrodynamics" attempted to explain what he had been unable to get across at Pocono. His 1949 paper on "The Theory of Positrons" addressed the Schrödinger equation and Dirac equation, and introduced what is now called the Feynman propagator. Finally, in papers on the "Mathematical Formulation of the Quantum Theory of Electromagnetic Interaction" in 1950 and "An Operator Calculus Having Applications in Quantum Electrodynamics" in 1951, he developed the mathematical basis of his ideas, derived familiar formulae and advanced new ones.

While papers by others initially cited Schwinger, papers citing Feynman and employing Feynman diagrams appeared in 1950, and soon became prevalent. Students learned and used the powerful new tool that Feynman had created. Computer programs were later written to evaluate Feynman diagrams, enabling physicists to use quantum field theory to make high-precision predictions. Marc Kac adapted Feynman's technique of summing over possible histories of a particle to the study of parabolic partial differential equations, yielding what is now known as the Feynman–Kac formula, the use of which extends beyond physics to many applications of stochastic processes. To Schwinger, however, the Feynman diagram was "pedagogy, not physics".

Looking back on this period, Feynman would reflect fondly on his time at the Telluride House, where he resided for a large period of his Cornell career. In an interview, he described the House as "a group of boys that have been specially selected because of their scholarship, because of their cleverness or whatever it is, to be given free board and lodging and so on, because of their brains". He enjoyed the house's convenience and said that "it's there that I did the fundamental work" for which he won the Nobel Prize.

However, Feynman was also reported to have been restless during his time at Cornell. By 1949, near the end of this period, he had still not settled into a permanent house or apartment, instead moving between guest houses and student residences. He spent some time living with various married friends, but these arrangements reportedly often ended when the "arrangements became sexually volatile".

At 31 years old, he was reported to frequently pursue married female friends and undergraduate students, and to hire sex workers; according to Gleick, this behavior strained many of his friendships. Feynman later wrote that he was not fond of Ithaca's cold winter weather and that he felt he lived in the shadow of Hans Bethe while at Cornell.

== Brazil (1949–1952) ==
Feynman spent several weeks in Rio de Janeiro in July 1949. That year, the Soviet Union detonated its first atomic bomb, generating concerns about espionage. Fuchs was arrested as a Soviet spy in 1950 and the FBI questioned Bethe about Feynman's loyalty. Physicist David Bohm was arrested on December 4, 1950, and immigrated to Brazil in October 1951. Because of the fears of a nuclear war, a girlfriend told Feynman that he should also consider moving to South America. He had a sabbatical coming for 1951–1952, and elected to spend it in Brazil, where he gave courses at the Centro Brasileiro de Pesquisas Físicas.

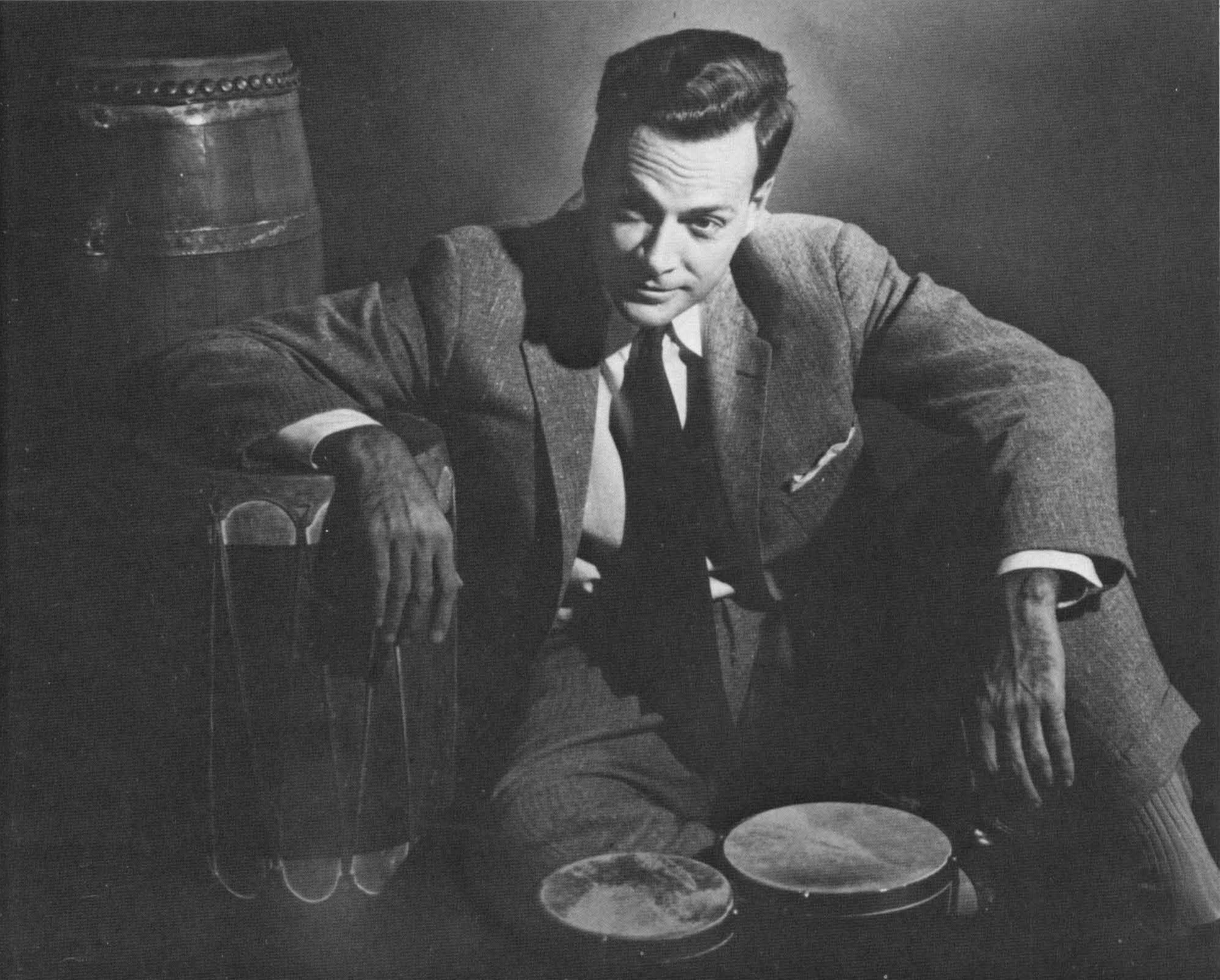
Feynman with drums

In Brazil, Feynman was impressed with samba music, and learned to play the frigideira, a metal percussion instrument based on a frying pan. He was an enthusiastic amateur player of bongo and conga drums and often played them in the pit orchestra in musicals. He spent time in Rio with his friend Bohm, but Bohm could not convince Feynman to investigate Bohm's ideas on physics.

== Caltech and later years (1952–1978) ==
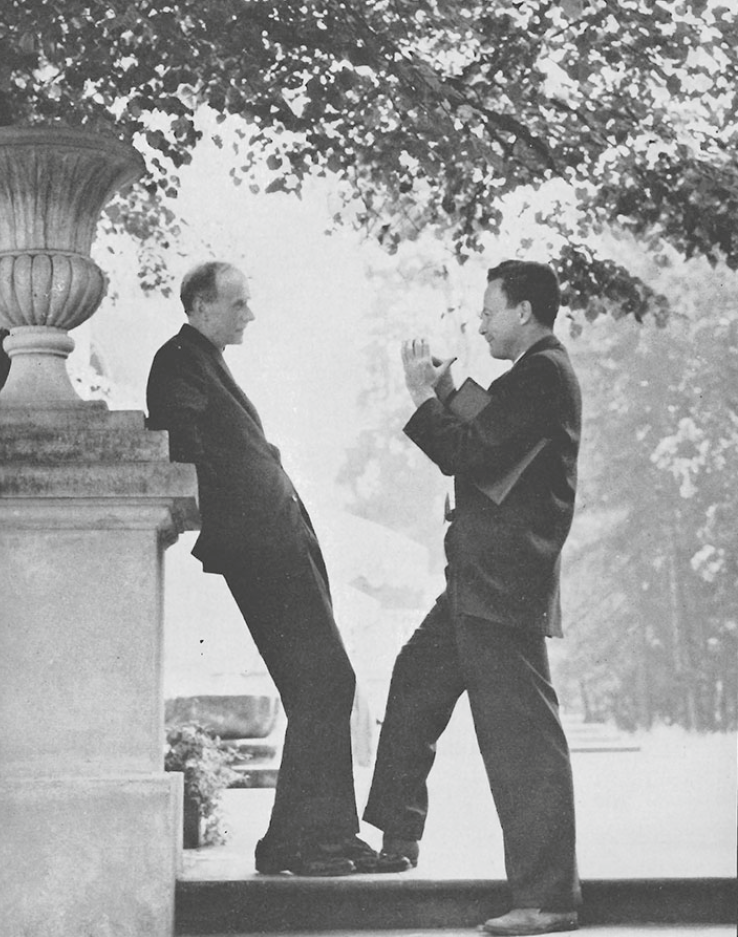
Paul Dirac and Richard Feynman at Jabłonna, Poland. July 1962.

=== Personal and political life ===
Feynman did not return to Cornell. Bacher, who had been instrumental in bringing Feynman to Cornell, had lured him to the California Institute of Technology (Caltech). Part of the deal was that he could spend his first year on sabbatical in Brazil. He had become smitten by Mary Louise Bell from Neodesha, Kansas. They had met in a cafeteria in Cornell, where she had studied the history of Mexican art and textiles. She later followed him to Caltech, where he gave a lecture. While he was in Brazil, she taught classes on the history of furniture and interiors at Michigan State University. He proposed to her by mail from Rio de Janeiro, and they married in Boise, Idaho, on June 28, 1952, shortly after he returned. They frequently quarreled and she was frightened by what she described as "a violent temper". Their politics were different; although he registered and voted as a Republican, she was more conservative, and her opinion on the 1954 Oppenheimer security hearing ("Where there's smoke there's fire") offended him. They separated on May 20, 1956. An interlocutory decree of divorce was entered on June 19, 1956, on the grounds of "extreme cruelty". The divorce became final on May 5, 1958.

... the appointee's wife was granted a divorce from him because of appointee's constantly working calculus problems in his head as soon as awake, while driving car, sitting in living room, and so forth, and that his one hobby was playing his African drums. His ex-wife reportedly testified that on several occasions when she unwittingly disturbed either his calculus or his drums he flew into a violent rage, during which time he choked her, threw pieces of bric-a-brac about and smashed the furniture ...

— Special Agent in Charge in Los Angeles, in mail to FBI director, July 24, 1958

In the wake of the 1957 Sputnik crisis, the U.S. government's interest in science rose for a time. Feynman was considered for a seat on the President's Science Advisory Committee, but was not appointed. At this time, the FBI interviewed a woman close to Feynman, possibly his ex-wife Bell, who sent a written statement to J. Edgar Hoover on August 8, 1958:

I do not know—but I believe that Richard Feynman is either a Communist or very strongly pro-Communist—and as such is a very definite security risk. This man is, in my opinion, an extremely complex and dangerous person, a very dangerous person to have in a position of public trust ... In matters of intrigue Richard Feynman is, I believe immensely clever—indeed a genius—and he is, I further believe, completely ruthless, unhampered by morals, ethics, or religion—and will stop at absolutely nothing to achieve his ends.

The U.S. government nevertheless sent Feynman to Geneva for the September 1958 Atoms for Peace Conference. On the beach at Lake Geneva, he met Gweneth Howarth, who was from Ripponden, West Yorkshire, and working in Switzerland as an au pair. Feynman's love life had been turbulent since his divorce; his previous girlfriend had walked off with his Albert Einstein Award medal and, on the advice of an earlier girlfriend, had feigned pregnancy and extorted him into paying for an abortion, then used the money to buy furniture. When Feynman found that Howarth was being paid only $25 a month, he offered her $20 (equivalent to $202 in 2022) a week to be his live-in maid. Feynman knew that this sort of behavior was illegal under the Mann Act, so he had a friend, Matthew Sands, act as her sponsor. Howarth pointed out that she already had two boyfriends, but decided to take Feynman up on his offer, and arrived in Altadena, California, in June 1959. She made a point of dating other men, but Feynman proposed in early 1960. They were married on September 24, 1960, at the Huntington Hotel in Pasadena. They had a son, Carl, in 1962, and adopted a daughter, Michelle, in 1968. Besides their home in Altadena, they had a beach house in Baja California, purchased with the money from Feynman's Nobel Prize.

=== Allegations of sexism ===
There were protests over his alleged sexism at Caltech in 1968, and again in 1972. Protesters "objected to his use of sexist stories about 'lady drivers' and clueless women in his lectures." Feynman recalled protesters entering a hall and picketing a lecture he was about to make in San Francisco, calling him a "sexist pig". He later reflected on the incident claiming that it prompted him to address the protesters, saying that "women do indeed suffer prejudice and discrimination in physics, and your presence here today serves to remind us of these difficulties and the need to remedy them".

In his 1985 memoir, Surely You're Joking, Mr. Feynman!, he recalled holding meetings in strip clubs, hiring a student as a nude life model while learning to draw during his time at Caltech, and pretending to be an undergraduate to deceive younger women into sleeping with him.

=== Feynman diagram van ===
In 1975, in Long Beach, California, Feynman bought a Dodge Tradesman Maxivan with a bronze-khaki exterior and yellow-green interior, with custom Feynman diagram exterior murals. Feynman chose QANTUM as the license plate ID since QED and QUARK were taken. After Feynman's death, Gweneth sold the van for $1 to one of Feynman's friends, film producer Ralph Leighton, who later put it into storage, where it began to rust. In 2012, video game designer Seamus Blackley, a father of the Xbox, bought the van.

=== Physics ===
At Caltech, Feynman investigated the physics of the superfluidity of supercooled liquid helium, where helium seems to display a complete lack of viscosity when flowing. Feynman provided a quantum-mechanical explanation for the Soviet physicist Lev Landau's theory of superfluidity. Applying the Schrödinger equation to the question showed that the superfluid was displaying quantum mechanical behavior observable on a macroscopic scale. This helped with the problem of superconductivity, but the solution eluded Feynman. It was solved with the BCS theory of superconductivity, proposed by John Bardeen, Leon Neil Cooper, and John Robert Schrieffer in 1957.

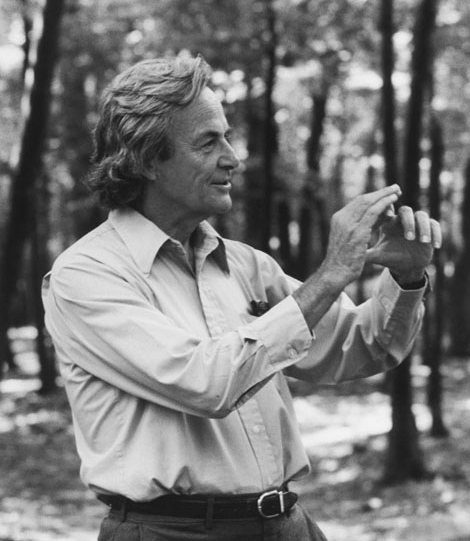
Feynman at the Robert Treat Paine Estate in Waltham, Massachusetts, in 1984

Feynman, inspired by a desire to quantize the Wheeler–Feynman absorber theory of electrodynamics, laid the groundwork for the path integral formulation and Feynman diagrams.

With Murray Gell-Mann, Feynman developed a model of weak decay, which showed that the current coupling in the process is a combination of vector and axial currents (an example of weak decay is the decay of a neutron into an electron, a proton, and an antineutrino). Although E. C. George Sudarshan and Robert Marshak developed the theory nearly simultaneously, Feynman's collaboration with Gell-Mann was seen as seminal because the weak interaction was neatly described by the vector and axial currents. It thus combined the 1933 beta decay theory of Enrico Fermi with an explanation of parity violation.

Feynman attempted an explanation, called the parton model, of the strong interactions governing nucleon scattering. The parton model emerged as a complement to the quark model developed by Gell-Mann. The relationship between the two models was murky; Gell-Mann referred to Feynman's partons derisively as "put-ons". In the mid-1960s, physicists believed that quarks were just a bookkeeping device for symmetry numbers, not real particles; the statistics of the omega-minus particle, if it were interpreted as three identical strange quarks bound together, seemed impossible if quarks were real.

The SLAC National Accelerator Laboratory deep inelastic scattering experiments of the late 1960s showed that nucleons (protons and neutrons) contained point-like particles that scattered electrons. It was natural to identify these with quarks, but Feynman's parton model attempted to interpret the experimental data in a way that did not introduce additional hypotheses. For example, the data showed that some 45% of the energy momentum was carried by electrically neutral particles in the nucleon. These electrically neutral particles are now seen to be the gluons that carry the forces between the quarks, and their three-valued color quantum number solves the omega-minus problem. Feynman did not dispute the quark model; for example, when the fifth quark was discovered in 1977, Feynman immediately pointed out to his students that the discovery implied the existence of a sixth quark, which was discovered in the decade after his death.

After the success of quantum electrodynamics, Feynman turned to quantum gravity. By analogy with the photon, which has spin 1, he investigated the consequences of a free massless spin 2 field and derived the Einstein field equation of general relativity, but little more. The computational device that Feynman discovered then for gravity, "ghosts", which are "particles" in the interior of his diagrams that have the "wrong" connection between spin and statistics, have proved invaluable in explaining the quantum particle behavior of the Yang–Mills theories, for example, quantum chromodynamics and the electro-weak theory. He did work on all four of the fundamental interactions of nature: electromagnetic, the weak force, the strong force and gravity. John and Mary Gribbin state in their book on Feynman that "Nobody else has made such influential contributions to the investigation of all four of the interactions".

Partly as a way to bring publicity to progress in physics, Feynman offered $1,000 prizes for two of his challenges in nanotechnology; one was claimed by William McLellan and the other by Tom Newman.

Feynman was also interested in the relationship between physics and computation. He was also one of the first scientists to conceive the possibility of quantum computers. In the 1980s he began to spend his summers working at Thinking Machines Corporation, helping to build some of the first parallel supercomputers and considering the construction of quantum computers.

Between 1984 and 1986, he developed a variational method for the approximate calculation of path integrals, which has led to a powerful method of converting divergent perturbation expansions into convergent strong-coupling expansions (variational perturbation theory) and, as a consequence, to the most accurate determination of critical exponents measured in satellite experiments. At Caltech, he once chalked "What I cannot create I do not understand" on his blackboard.

=== Machine technology ===
Feynman's vision of a medical use for nanotechnology by swallowing the doctor may be partially achieved by the ribosome, which functions as a biological machine. Such protein domain dynamics can only now be seen by neutron spin echo spectroscopy.

Feynman had studied the ideas of John von Neumann while researching quantum field theory. His most famous lecture on the subject was delivered in 1959 at the California Institute of Technology, published under the title "There's Plenty of Room at the Bottom" a year later. In this lecture he theorized on future opportunities for designing miniaturized machines, which could build smaller reproductions of themselves. This lecture is frequently cited in technical literature on microtechnology, and nanotechnology.

Feynman also suggested that it should be possible, in principle, to make nanoscale machines that "arrange the atoms the way we want" and do chemical synthesis by mechanical manipulation.

He also presented the possibility of "swallowing the doctor", an idea that he credited in the essay to his friend and graduate student Albert Hibbs. This concept involved building a tiny, swallowable surgical robot.

=== Pedagogy ===
In the early 1960s, Feynman acceded to a request to "spruce up" the teaching of undergraduates at Caltech. After three years devoted to the task, he produced a series of lectures that later became The Feynman Lectures on Physics. Accounts vary about how successful the original lectures were. Feynman's own preface, written just after an exam on which the students did poorly, was somewhat pessimistic. His colleagues David L. Goodstein and Gerry Neugebauer said later that the intended audience of first-year students found the material intimidating while older students and faculty found it inspirational, so the lecture hall remained full even as the first-year students dropped away. In contrast, physicist Matthew Sands recalled the student attendance as being typical for a large lecture course.

Converting the lectures into books occupied Matthew Sands and Robert B. Leighton as part-time co-authors for several years. Feynman suggested that the book cover should have a picture of a drum with mathematical diagrams about vibrations drawn upon it, in order to illustrate the application of mathematics to understanding the world. Instead, the publishers gave the books plain red covers, though they included a picture of Feynman playing drums in the foreword. Even though the books were not adopted by universities as textbooks, they continue to sell well because they provide a deep understanding of physics.

Many of Feynman's lectures and miscellaneous talks were turned into other books, including The Character of Physical Law, QED: The Strange Theory of Light and Matter, Statistical Mechanics, Lectures on Gravitation, and the Feynman Lectures on Computation.

Feynman wrote about his experiences teaching physics undergraduates in Brazil. The students' studying habits and the Portuguese language textbooks were so devoid of any context or applications for their information that, in Feynman's opinion, the students were not learning physics at all. At the end of the year, Feynman was invited to give a lecture on his teaching experiences, and he agreed to do so, provided he could speak frankly, which he did.

Feynman opposed rote learning, or unthinking memorization, as well as other teaching methods that emphasized form over function. In his mind, clear thinking and clear presentation were fundamental prerequisites for his attention. It could be perilous even to approach him unprepared, and he did not forget fools and pretenders.

In 1964, he served on the California State Curriculum Commission, which was responsible for approving textbooks to be used by schools in California. He was not impressed with what he found. Many of the mathematics texts covered subjects of use only to pure mathematicians as part of the "New Math". Elementary students were taught about sets, but:

It will perhaps surprise most people who have studied these textbooks to discover that the symbol ∪ or ∩ representing union and intersection of sets and the special use of the brackets { } and so forth, all the elaborate notation for sets that is given in these books, almost never appear in any writings in theoretical physics, in engineering, in business arithmetic, computer design, or other places where mathematics is being used. I see no need or reason for this all to be explained or to be taught in school. It is not a useful way to express one's self. It is not a cogent and simple way. It is claimed to be precise, but precise for what purpose?

In April 1966, Feynman delivered an address to the National Science Teachers Association, in which he suggested how students could be made to think like scientists, be open-minded, curious, and especially, to doubt. In the course of the lecture, he gave a definition of science, which he said came about by several stages. The evolution of intelligent life on planet Earth—creatures such as cats that play and learn from experience. The evolution of humans, who came to use language to pass knowledge from one individual to the next, so that the knowledge was not lost when an individual died. Unfortunately, incorrect knowledge could be passed down as well as correct knowledge, so another step was needed. Galileo and others started doubting the truth of what was passed down and to investigate ab initio, from experience, what the true situation was—this was science.

In 1974, Feynman delivered the Caltech commencement address on the topic of cargo cult science, which has the semblance of science, but is only pseudoscience due to a lack of "a kind of scientific integrity, a principle of scientific thought that corresponds to a kind of utter honesty" on the part of the scientist. He instructed the graduating class that "The first principle is that you must not fool yourself—and you are the easiest person to fool. So you have to be very careful about that. After you've not fooled yourself, it's easy not to fool other scientists. You just have to be honest in a conventional way after that."

Feynman served as doctoral advisor to 30 students.

=== Case before the Equal Employment Opportunity Commission ===
In 1977, Feynman supported his English literature colleague Jenijoy La Belle, who had been hired as Caltech's first female professor in 1969, and filed suit with the Equal Employment Opportunity Commission after she was refused tenure in 1974. The EEOC ruled against Caltech in 1977, adding that La Belle had been paid less than male colleagues. La Belle finally received tenure in 1979. Many of Feynman's colleagues were surprised that he took her side, but he had gotten to know La Belle and liked and admired her.

=== Surely You're Joking, Mr. Feynman! ===
In the 1960s, Feynman began thinking of writing an autobiography, and he began granting interviews to historians. In the 1980s, working with Ralph Leighton (Robert Leighton's son), he recorded chapters on audio tape that Ralph transcribed. The book was published in 1985 as Surely You're Joking, Mr. Feynman! and became a best-seller.

Gell-Mann was upset by Feynman's account in the book of the weak interaction work, and threatened to sue, resulting in a correction being inserted in later editions. This incident was just the latest provocation in decades of bad feeling between the two scientists. Gell-Mann often expressed frustration at the attention Feynman received; he remarked: "[Feynman] was a great scientist, but he spent a great deal of his effort generating anecdotes about himself."

Feynman has been criticized for a chapter in the book entitled "You Just Ask Them?", where he describes how he learned to seduce women at a bar he went to in the summer of 1946. A mentor taught him to ask a woman if she would sleep with him before buying her anything. He describes seeing women at the bar as "bitches" in his thoughts, and tells a story of how he told a woman named Ann that she was "worse than a whore" after Ann persuaded him to buy her sandwiches by telling him he could eat them at her place, but then, after he bought them, saying they actually could not eat together because another man was coming over. Later on that same evening, Ann returned to the bar to take Feynman to her place. Feynman states at the end of the chapter that this behavior was not typical of him: "So it worked even with an ordinary girl! But no matter how effective the lesson was, I never really used it after that. I didn't enjoy doing it that way. But it was interesting to know that things worked much differently from how I was brought up."

=== Challenger disaster ===
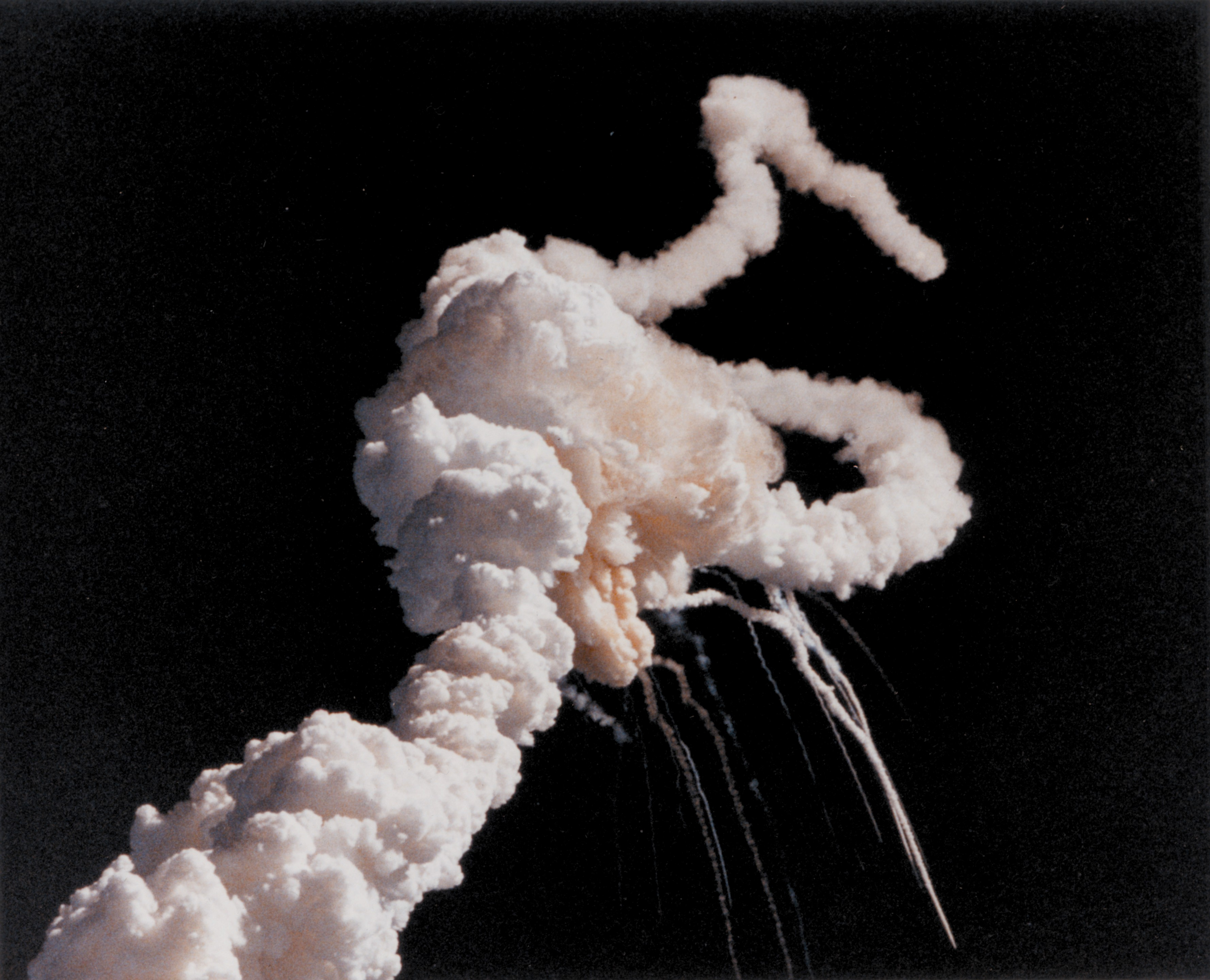
The 1986 Space Shuttle Challenger disaster

Feynman played an important role on the Presidential Rogers Commission, which investigated the 1986 Space Shuttle Challenger disaster. He had been reluctant to participate, but was persuaded by advice from his wife. Feynman clashed several times with commission chairman William P. Rogers. During a break in one hearing, Rogers told commission member Neil Armstrong, "Feynman is becoming a pain in the ass."

During a televised hearing, Feynman demonstrated that the material used in the shuttle's O-rings became less resilient in cold weather by compressing a sample of the material in a clamp and immersing it in ice-cold water. The commission ultimately determined that the disaster was caused by the primary O-ring not properly sealing in unusually cold weather at Cape Canaveral. He warned in his appendix to the commission's report: "For a successful technology, reality must take precedence over public relations, for nature cannot be fooled."

=== Recognition and awards ===
The first public recognition of Feynman's work came in 1954, when Lewis Strauss, the chairman of the Atomic Energy Commission (AEC) notified him that he had won the Albert Einstein Award, which was worth $15,000 and came with a gold medal. Because of Strauss's actions in stripping Oppenheimer of his security clearance, Feynman was reluctant to accept the award, but Isidor Isaac Rabi cautioned him: "You should never turn a man's generosity as a sword against him. Any virtue that a man has, even if he has many vices, should not be used as a tool against him." It was followed by the AEC's Ernest Orlando Lawrence Award in 1962. Schwinger, Tomonaga and Feynman shared the 1965 Nobel Prize in Physics "for their fundamental work in quantum electrodynamics, with deep-ploughing consequences for the physics of elementary particles". He was elected a Foreign Member of the Royal Society in 1965, received the Oersted Medal in 1972, and the National Medal of Science in 1979. He was elected a Member of the National Academy of Sciences, but ultimately resigned and is no longer listed by them. Schwinger called him "an honest man, the outstanding intuitionist of our age, and a prime example of what may lie in store for anyone who dares follow the beat of a different drum."

== Death ==
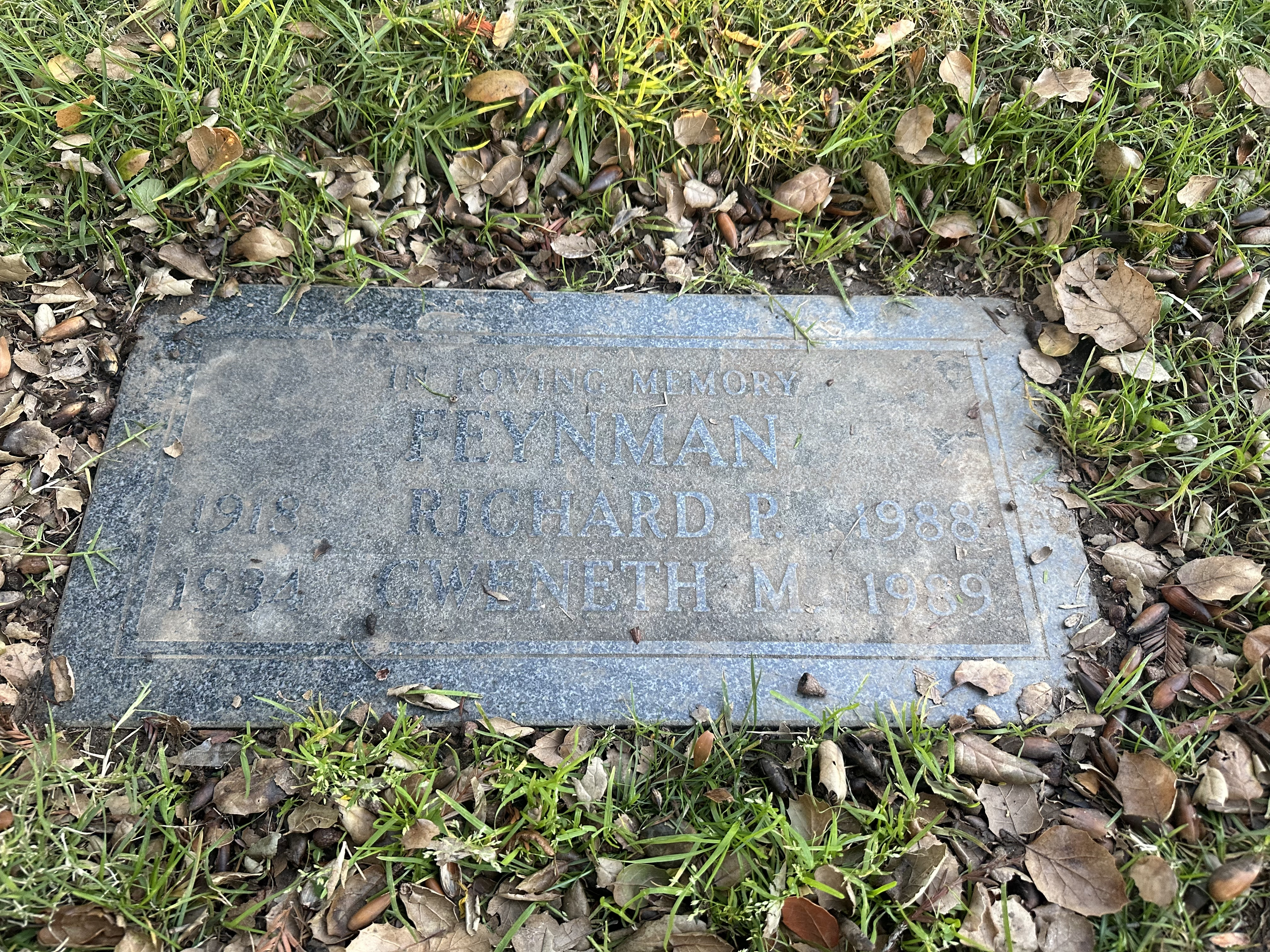
Richard P. and Gweneth M. Feynman's grave

In 1978, Feynman sought medical treatment for abdominal pains and was diagnosed with liposarcoma, a rare form of cancer. Surgeons removed a "very large" tumor that had crushed one kidney and his spleen. In 1986, doctors discovered another cancer, Waldenström macroglobulinemia. Further operations were performed in October 1986 and October 1987. He was again hospitalized at the UCLA Medical Center on February 3, 1988. A ruptured duodenal ulcer caused kidney failure, and he declined to undergo the dialysis that might have prolonged his life for a few months. Feynman's wife Gweneth, sister Joan, and cousin Frances Lewine watched over him during the final days of his life until he died on February 15, 1988, at age 69.

When Feynman was nearing death, he asked his friend and colleague Danny Hillis why Hillis appeared so sad. Hillis replied that he thought Feynman was going to die soon. Hillis quotes Feynman as replying:

"Yeah," he sighed, "that bugs me sometimes too. But not so much as you think. [...] When you get as old as I am, you start to realize that you've told most of the good stuff you know to other people anyway."

Near the end of his life, Feynman attempted to visit the Tuvan Autonomous Soviet Socialist Republic (ASSR) in the Soviet Union, a dream thwarted by Cold War bureaucratic issues. The letter from the Soviet government authorizing the trip was not received until the day after he died. His daughter Michelle later made the journey. Ralph Leighton chronicled the attempt in Tuva or Bust!, published in 1991.

His burial was at Mountain View Cemetery and Mausoleum in Altadena, California. His last words were "This dying is boring" in reference to the extended coma that preceded his death.

== Popular legacy ==
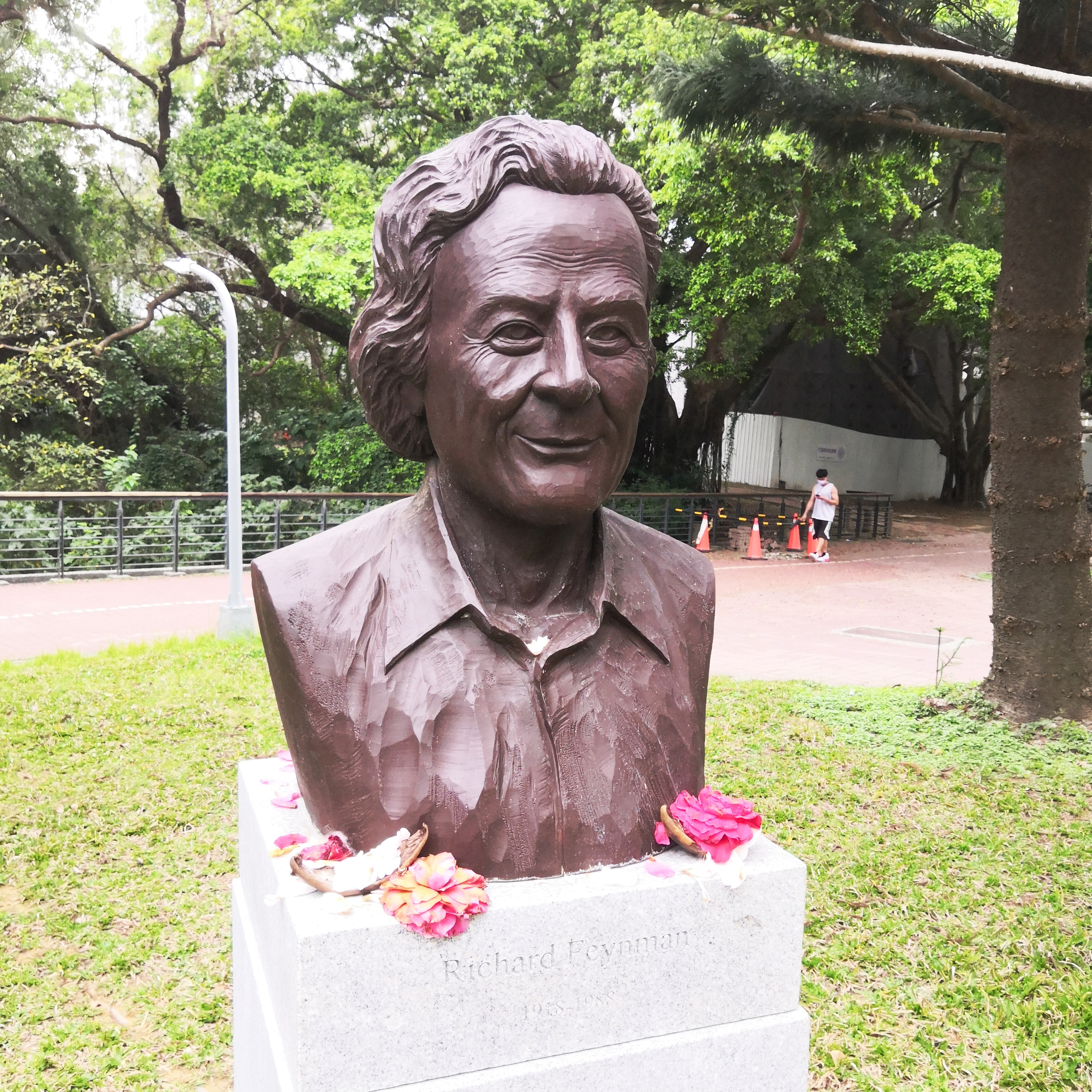
Bust of Feynman on NTHU campus, Taiwan

Aspects of Feynman's life have been portrayed in various media. Feynman was portrayed by Matthew Broderick in the 1996 biopic Infinity. Actor Alan Alda commissioned playwright Peter Parnell to write a two-character play about a fictional day in the life of Feynman set two years before Feynman's death. The play, QED, premiered at the Mark Taper Forum in Los Angeles in 2001 and was later presented at the Vivian Beaumont Theater on Broadway, with both productions starring Alda as Richard Feynman. Real Time Opera premiered its opera Feynman at the Norfolk (Connecticut) Chamber Music Festival in June 2005. In 2011, Feynman was the subject of a biographical graphic novel entitled simply Feynman, written by Jim Ottaviani and illustrated by Leland Myrick. In 2013, Feynman's role on the Rogers Commission was dramatized by the BBC in The Challenger (US title: The Challenger Disaster), with William Hurt playing Feynman. In 2016, Oscar Isaac performed a public reading of Feynman's 1946 love letter to the late Arline. In the 2023 American film Oppenheimer, directed by Christopher Nolan and based on American Prometheus, Feynman is portrayed by actor Jack Quaid.

On May 4, 2005, the United States Postal Service issued the "American Scientists" commemorative set of four 37-cent stamps in several configurations. The scientists depicted were Richard Feynman, John von Neumann, Barbara McClintock, and Josiah Willard Gibbs. Feynman's stamp features a photograph of Feynman in his thirties and eight small Feynman diagrams. The stamps were designed by Victor Stabin under the artistic direction of Carl T. Herrman. The main building for the Computing Division at Fermilab is named the "Feynman Computing Center" in his honor, as is the Richard P. Feynman Center for Innovation at the Los Alamos National Laboratory. Two photographs of Feynman were used in Apple Computer's "Think Different" advertising campaign, which launched in 1997. Sheldon Cooper, a fictional theoretical physicist from the television series The Big Bang Theory, was depicted as a Feynman fan, even emulating him by playing the bongo drums. On January 27, 2016, Microsoft co-founder Bill Gates wrote an article describing Feynman's talents as a teacher ("The Best Teacher I Never Had"), which inspired Gates to create Project Tuva to place the videos of Feynman's Messenger Lectures, The Character of Physical Law, on a website for public viewing. In 2015, Gates made a video in response to Caltech's request for thoughts on Feynman for the 50th anniversary of Feynman's 1965 Nobel Prize, on why he thought Feynman was special.

== Works ==
=== Selected scientific works ===
- Feynman, Richard P. (2005) [1942]. Laurie M. Brown (ed.). The Principle of Least Action in Quantum Mechanics. PhD Dissertation, Princeton University. World Scientific (with title "Feynman's Thesis: a New Approach to Quantum Theory"). ISBN 978-981-256-380-4
- Wheeler, John A.; Feynman, Richard P. (1945). "Interaction with the Absorber as the Mechanism of Radiation". Reviews of Modern Physics. 17 (2–3): 157–181. Bibcode:1945RvMP...17..157W. doi:10.1103/RevModPhys.17.157. Archived from the original on April 17, 2020.
- Feynman, Richard P. (1946). A Theorem and its Application to Finite Tampers. Los Alamos Scientific Laboratory, Atomic Energy Commission. doi:10.2172/4341197. OSTI 4341197.
- Feynman, Richard P.; Welton, T. A. (1946). Neutron Diffusion in a Space Lattice of Fissionable and Absorbing Materials. Los Alamos Scientific Laboratory, Atomic Energy Commission. doi:10.2172/4381097. OSTI 4381097.
- Feynman, Richard P.; Metropolis, N.; Teller, E. (1947). Equations of State of Elements Based on the Generalized Fermi-Thomas Theory (PDF). Los Alamos Scientific Laboratory, Atomic Energy Commission. doi:10.2172/4417654. OSTI 4417654.
- Feynman, Richard P. (1948). "Space-time approach to non-relativistic quantum mechanics". Reviews of Modern Physics. 20 (2): 367–387. Bibcode:1948RvMP...20..367F. doi:10.1103/RevModPhys.20.367. Archived from the original on September 17, 2020.
- Feynman, Richard P. (1948). "A Relativistic Cut-Off for Classical Electrodynamics". Physical Review. 74 (8): 939–946. Bibcode:1948PhRv...74..939F. doi:10.1103/PhysRev.74.939. Archived from the original on September 19, 2020.
- Feynman, Richard P. (1948). "Relativistic Cut-Off for Quantum Electrodynamics". Physical Review. 74 (10): 1430–1438. Bibcode:1948PhRv...74.1430F. doi:10.1103/PhysRev.74.1430. Archived from the original on September 19, 2020.
- Wheeler, John A.; Feynman, Richard P. (1949). "Classical Electrodynamics in Terms of Direct Interparticle Action" (PDF). Reviews of Modern Physics. 21 (3): 425–433. Bibcode:1949RvMP...21..425W. doi:10.1103/RevModPhys.21.425.
- Feynman, Richard P. (1949). "The theory of positrons". Physical Review. 76 (6): 749–759. Bibcode:1949PhRv...76..749F. doi:10.1103/PhysRev.76.749. S2CID 120117564. Archived from the original on August 9, 2022.
- Feynman, Richard P. (1949). "Space-Time Approach to Quantum Electrodynamic". Physical Review. 76 (6): 769–789. Bibcode:1949PhRv...76..769F. doi:10.1103/PhysRev.76.769.
- Feynman, Richard P. (1950). "Mathematical formulation of the quantum theory of electromagnetic interaction". Physical Review. 80 (3): 440–457. Bibcode:1950PhRv...80..440F. doi:10.1103/PhysRev.80.440. Archived from the original on September 14, 2020.
- Feynman, Richard P. (1951). "An Operator Calculus Having Applications in Quantum Electrodynamics". Physical Review. 84 (1): 108–128. Bibcode:1951PhRv...84..108F. doi:10.1103/PhysRev.84.108. Archived from the original on September 15, 2020.
- Feynman, Richard P. (1953). "The λ-Transition in Liquid Helium". Physical Review. 90 (6): 1116–1117. Bibcode:1953PhRv...90.1116F. doi:10.1103/PhysRev.90.1116.2. Archived from the original on September 17, 2020.
- Feynman, Richard P.; de Hoffmann, F.; Serber, R. (1955). Dispersion of the Neutron Emission in U235 Fission. Los Alamos Scientific Laboratory, Atomic Energy Commission. doi:10.2172/4354998. OSTI 4354998.
- Feynman, Richard P. (1956). "Science and the Open Channel". Science. 123 (3191): 307. Bibcode:1956Sci...123..307F. doi:10.1126/science.123.3191.307. PMID 17774518.
- Cohen, M.; Feynman, Richard P. (1957). "Theory of Inelastic Scattering of Cold Neutrons from Liquid Helium". Physical Review. 107 (1): 13–24. Bibcode:1957PhRv..107...13C. doi:10.1103/PhysRev.107.13. Archived from the original on September 14, 2020.
- Feynman, Richard P.; Vernon, F. L.; Hellwarth, R. W. (1957). "Geometric representation of the Schrödinger equation for solving maser equations" (PDF). Journal of Applied Physics. 28 (1): 49. Bibcode:1957JAP....28...49F. doi:10.1063/1.1722572.
- Feynman, Richard P. (1960). "There's Plenty of Room at the Bottom". Engineering and Science. 23 (5): 22–36.
- Edgar, R. S.; Feynman, Richard P.; Klein, S.; Lielausis, I.; Steinberg, C. M. (1962). "Mapping experiments with r mutants of bacteriophage T4D". Genetics. 47 (2): 179–86. doi:10.1093/genetics/47.2.179. PMC 1210321. PMID 13889186.
- Feynman, Richard P. (1968) [1966]. "What is Science?" (PDF). The Physics Teacher. 7 (6): 313–320. Bibcode:1969PhTea...7..313F. doi:10.1119/1.2351388. Lecture presented at the fifteenth annual meeting of the National Science Teachers Association, 1966 in New York City.
- Feynman, Richard P. (1966). "The Development of the Space-Time View of Quantum Electrodynamics". Science. 153 (3737): 699–708. Bibcode:1966Sci...153..699F. doi:10.1126/science.153.3737.699. PMID 17791121.
- Feynman, Richard P. (1974a). "Structure of the proton". Science. 183 (4125). American Association for the Advancement of Science: 601–610. Bibcode:1974Sci...183..601F. doi:10.1126/science.183.4125.601. JSTOR 1737688. PMID 17778830. S2CID 9938227.
- Feynman, Richard P. (1974). "Cargo Cult Science" (PDF). Engineering and Science. 37 (7). Archived from the original (PDF) on March 4, 2009.
- Feynman, Richard P.; Kleinert, Hagen (1986). "Effective classical partition functions" (PDF). Physical Review A. 34 (6): 5080–5084. Bibcode:1986PhRvA..34.5080F. doi:10.1103/PhysRevA.34.5080. PMID 9897894.
- Feynman, Richard P. (1986). Rogers Commission Report, Volume 2 Appendix F – Personal Observations on Reliability of Shuttle. NASA.
- Feynman, Richard P. (1988), "Difficulties in Applying the Variational Principle to Quantum Field Theories", in Polley, L.; Pottinger, D. E. L. (eds.), Variational Calculations in Quantum Field Theory, World Scientific, pp. 28–40, doi:10.1142/9789814390187_0003, ISBN 9971-50-500-2 Proceedings of the International Workshop at Wangerooge Island, Germany; Sept 1–4, 1987.
- Feynman, Richard P. (2000). Laurie M. Brown (ed.). Selected Papers of Richard Feynman: With Commentary. 20th Century Physics. World Scientific. ISBN 978-981-02-4131-5.

=== Textbooks and lecture notes ===
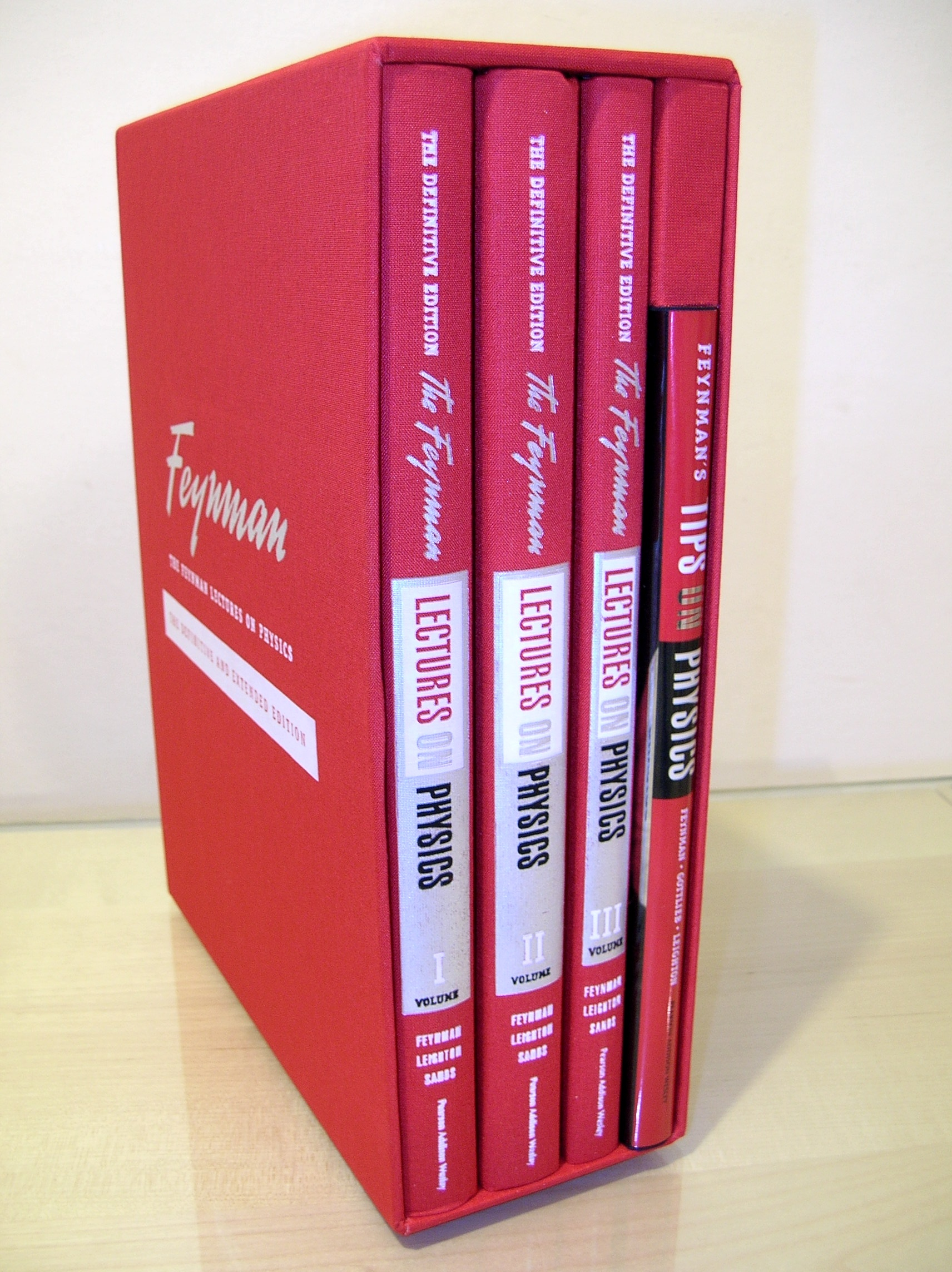
The Feynman Lectures on Physics including Feynman's Tips on Physics: The Definitive and Extended Edition (2nd edition, 2005)

The Feynman Lectures on Physics is perhaps his most accessible work for anyone with an interest in physics, compiled from lectures to Caltech undergraduates in 1961–1964. As news of the lectures' lucidity grew, professional physicists and graduate students began to drop in to listen. Co-authors Robert B. Leighton and Matthew Sands, colleagues of Feynman, edited and illustrated them into book form. The work has endured and is useful to this day. They were edited and supplemented in 2005 with Feynman's Tips on Physics: A Problem-Solving Supplement to the Feynman Lectures on Physics by Michael Gottlieb and Ralph Leighton (Robert Leighton's son), with support from Kip Thorne and other physicists.

- Feynman, Richard P.; Leighton, Robert B.; Sands, Matthew (2005) [1970]. The Feynman Lectures on Physics: The Definitive and Extended Edition (2nd ed.). Addison Wesley. ISBN 0-8053-9045-6. Includes Feynman's Tips on Physics (with Michael Gottlieb and Ralph Leighton), which includes four previously unreleased lectures on problem solving, exercises by Robert Leighton and Rochus Vogt, and a historical essay by Matthew Sands. Three volumes; originally published as separate volumes in 1964 and 1966.
- Feynman, Richard P. (1961). Theory of Fundamental Processes. Addison Wesley.
- Feynman, Richard P. (1962). Quantum Electrodynamics. Addison Wesley.
- Feynman, Richard P.; Hibbs, Albert (1965). Quantum Mechanics and Path Integrals. McGraw Hill. ISBN 0-07-020650-3.
- Feynman, Richard P. (1967). The Character of Physical Law: The 1964 Messenger Lectures. MIT Press. ISBN 0-262-56003-8.
- Feynman, Richard P. (1972). Statistical Mechanics: A Set of Lectures. Reading, Mass: W. A. Benjamin. ISBN 0-8053-2509-3.
- Feynman, Richard P. (1972). Photon-Hadron interactions. Reading, Mass: W. A. Benjamin. ISBN 0-201-36074-8.
- Feynman, Richard P. (1985b). QED: The Strange Theory of Light and Matter. Princeton University Press. ISBN 0-691-02417-0.
- Feynman, Richard P. (1987). Elementary Particles and the Laws of Physics: The 1986 Dirac Memorial Lectures. Cambridge University Press. ISBN 0-521-34000-4.
- Feynman, Richard P. (1995). Brian Hatfield (ed.). Lectures on Gravitation. Addison Wesley Longman. ISBN 0-201-62734-5.
- Feynman, Richard P. (1997). Feynman's Lost Lecture: The Motion of Planets Around the Sun (Vintage Press ed.). London, England: Vintage. ISBN 0-09-973621-7.
- Feynman, Richard P. (2000). Hey, Tony; Allen, Robin W. (eds.). Feynman Lectures on Computation. Perseus Books Group. ISBN 0-7382-0296-7. "Computer science also differs from physics in that it is not actually a science. It does not study natural objects. Neither is it, as you might think, mathematics; although it does use mathematical reasoning pretty extensively. Rather, computer science is like engineering – it is all about getting something to do something, rather than just dealing with abstractions".

=== Popular works ===
- Feynman, Richard P. (1985). Leighton, Ralph (ed.). Surely You're Joking, Mr. Feynman!: Adventures of a Curious Character. W. W. Norton & Company. ISBN 0-393-01921-7. OCLC 10925248.
- Feynman, Richard P. (1988a). Leighton, Ralph (ed.). What Do You Care What Other People Think?: Further Adventures of a Curious Character. W. W. Norton & Company. ISBN 0-393-02659-0.
- No Ordinary Genius: The Illustrated Richard Feynman, ed. Christopher Sykes, W. W. Norton & Company, 1996, ISBN 0-393-31393-X.
- Six Easy Pieces: Essentials of Physics Explained by Its Most Brilliant Teacher, Perseus Books, 1994, ISBN 0-201-40955-0. Listed by the board of directors of the Modern Library as one of the 100 best nonfiction books.
- Six Not So Easy Pieces: Einstein's Relativity, Symmetry and Space-Time, Addison Wesley, 1997, ISBN 0-201-15026-3.
- Feynman, Richard P. (1998). The Meaning of It All: Thoughts of a Citizen-Scientist. Reading, Massachusetts: Perseus Publishing. ISBN 0-7382-0166-9.
- Feynman, Richard P. (1999). Robbins, Jeffrey (ed.). The Pleasure of Finding Things Out: The Best Short Works of Richard P. Feynman. Cambridge, Massachusetts: Perseus Books. ISBN 0-7382-0108-1.
- Classic Feynman: All the Adventures of a Curious Character, edited by Ralph Leighton, W. W. Norton & Company, 2005, ISBN 0-393-06132-9. Chronologically reordered omnibus volume of Surely You're Joking, Mr. Feynman! and What Do You Care What Other People Think?, with a bundled CD containing one of Feynman's signature lectures.

=== Audio and video recordings ===
- Safecracker Suite (a collection of drum pieces interspersed with Feynman telling anecdotes)
- Los Alamos From Below (audio, talk given by Feynman at Santa Barbara on February 6, 1975)
- The Feynman Lectures on Physics: The Complete Audio Collection, selections from which were also released as Six Easy Pieces and Six Not So Easy Pieces
- The Messenger Lectures (link), given at Cornell in 1964, in which he explains basic topics in physics; they were also adapted into the book The Character of Physical Law
- The Douglas Robb Memorial Lectures, four public lectures of which the four chapters of the book QED: The Strange Theory of Light and Matter are transcripts. (1979)
- The Pleasure of Finding Things Out, BBC Horizon episode (1981) (not to be confused with the later published book of the same title)
- Richard Feynman: Fun to Imagine Collection, BBC Archive of six short films of Feynman talking in a style that is accessible to all about the physics behind common to all experiences. (1983)
- Elementary Particles and the Laws of Physics, from the 1986 Dirac Memorial Lectures (video, 1986)
- Tiny Machines: The Feynman Talk on Nanotechnology (video, 1984)
- Computers From the Inside Out (video)
- Quantum Mechanical View of Reality: Workshop at Esalen (video, 1983)
- Idiosyncratic Thinking Workshop (video, 1985)
- Bits and Pieces—From Richard's Life and Times (video, 1988)
- Strangeness Minus Three (video, BBC Horizon 1964)
- No Ordinary Genius (video, Cristopher Sykes Documentary)
- Four NOVA episodes are made about or with him. (TV program, 1975, 1983, 1989, 1993)
- The Motion of Planets Around the Sun (audio, sometimes titled "Feynman's Lost Lecture")
- Nature of Matter (audio)

== Sources ==
- Bashe, Charles J.; Johnson, Lyle R.; Palmer, John H.; Pugh, Emerson W. (1986). IBM's Early Computers. Cambridge, Massachusetts: MIT. ISBN 0-262-02225-7. OCLC 12021988.
- Bethe, Hans A. (1991). The Road from Los Alamos. Masters of Modern Physics. Vol. 2. New York: Simon and Schuster. ISBN 0-671-74012-1. OCLC 24734608.
- Brian, Denis (2001). The Voice of Genius: Conversations with Nobel Scientists and Other Luminaries. Cambridge, Massachusetts: Perseus. ISBN 978-0-7382-0447-5. OCLC 751292707.
- Carroll, John Bissell (1996). Sternberg, Robert J.; Ben-Zeev, Talia (eds.). The Nature of Mathematical Thinking. Mahwah, New Jersey: L. Erlbaum Associates. ISBN 978-0-8058-1799-7. OCLC 34513302.
- Chown, Marcus (May 2, 1985). "Strangeness and Charm". New Scientist: 34. ISSN 0262-4079.
- Close, Frank (2011). The Infinity Puzzle: The Personalities, Politics, and Extraordinary Science Behind the Higgs Boson. Oxford University Press. ISBN 978-0-19-959350-7. OCLC 840427493.
- Deutsch, David (June 1, 1992). "Quantum computation". Physics World. 5 (6): 57–61. doi:10.1088/2058-7058/5/6/38. ISSN 0953-8585.
- Friedman, Jerome (2004). "A Student's View of Fermi". In Cronin, James W. (ed.). Fermi Remembered. Chicago, Illinois: University of Chicago Press. ISBN 978-0-226-12111-6. OCLC 835230762.
- Galison, Peter (1998). "Feynman's War: Modelling Weapons, Modelling Nature". Studies in History and Philosophy of Science Part B: Studies in History and Philosophy of Modern Physics. 29 (3): 391–434. Bibcode:1998SHPMP..29..391G. doi:10.1016/S1355-2198(98)00013-6.
- Gleick, James (1992). Genius: The Life and Science of Richard Feynman. Pantheon Books. ISBN 0-679-40836-3. OCLC 243743850.
- Gribbin, John; Gribbin, Mary (1997). Richard Feynman: A Life in Science. Dutton. ISBN 0-525-94124-X. OCLC 636838499.
- Henderson, Harry (2011). Richard Feynman: Quarks, Bombs, and Bongos. Chelsea House Publishers. ISBN 978-0-8160-6176-1. OCLC 751114185.
- Hoddeson, Lillian; Henriksen, Paul W.; Meade, Roger A.; Westfall, Catherine L. (1993). Critical Assembly: A Technical History of Los Alamos During the Oppenheimer Years, 1943–1945. New York: Cambridge University Press. ISBN 0-521-44132-3. OCLC 26764320.
- Mehra, Jagdish (1994). The Beat of a Different Drum: The Life and Science of Richard Feynman. New York: Oxford University Press. ISBN 0-19-853948-7. OCLC 28507544.
- Oakes, Elizabeth H. (2007). Encyclopedia of World Scientists, Revised edition. New York: Facts on File. ISBN 978-1-4381-1882-6. OCLC 466364697.
- Peat, David (1997). Infinite Potential: the Life and Times of David Bohm. Reading, Massachusetts: Addison Wesley. ISBN 0-201-40635-7. OCLC 1014736570.
- Pugh, Kevin J. (2017). Computers, Cockroaches, and Ecosystems: Understanding Learning Through Metaphor. Charlotte, North Carolina: Information Age Publishing. ISBN 978-1-68123-776-3. OCLC 971941339.
- Schweber, Silvan S. (1994). QED and the Men Who Made It: Dyson, Feynman, Schwinger, and Tomonaga. Princeton University Press. ISBN 0-691-03327-7. OCLC 918243948.
- Sykes, Christopher (1994). No Ordinary Genius: the Illustrated Richard Feynman. New York: W. W. Norton. ISBN 0-393-03621-9. OCLC 924553844.
- Smith, Alice Kimball; Weiner, Charles (1980). Robert Oppenheimer: Letters and Recollections. Cambridge, Massachusetts: Harvard University Press. ISBN 978-0-8047-2620-7.
