= Tuva or Bust! =

1991 book by Ralph Leighton

Tuva or Bust!: Richard Feynman's Last Journey
- Author: Ralph Leighton
- Language: English
- Publisher: W. W. Norton
- Publication date: 1991
- Publication place: United States
- Pages: 260
- ISBN: 0-393-32069-3

Tuva or Bust! (1991) is a book by Ralph Leighton about the author and his friend Richard Feynman's attempt to travel to Tuva, then in the Soviet Union.

The introduction explains how Feynman challenged Leighton, at the time a high school math teacher, "Whatever happened to Tannu Tuva?" Since Feynman had a reputation as a prankster, Leighton assumed it was made up. But the country existed, and the pair became fascinated with this hard-to-reach destination in the middle of Asia, which had become a republic in the Soviet Union. They made it a goal to travel there, which, for Americans in the late 1970s and early 1980s, was extremely difficult.

In many ways, the attempt to travel to Tuva is an allegory for Feynman's perpetual curiosity to discover new things, and how he inspired his friends, admirers and protégés to do the same. During their decade-long quest to travel to Tuva, Feynman was suffering from cancer, and died shortly before the visas finally arrived; this book describes "Richard Feynman's last adventure".

The book describes the difficulties and various attempts Leighton and Feynman made to obtain permission to travel to Tuva. It also describes the culture, language and history of the place. Included with some editions of the book is a small flexi disc of Tuvan throat singing.

Essentially the same subject of Feynman's and Leighton's interactions and tribulations was also the basis for a documentary titled The Quest for Tannu Tuva, which was released before the book was published. It was produced for the BBC TV series Horizon and first broadcast on 4 July 1988. That documentary was in turn repackaged with a new American narration and titled The Last Journey of a Genius, which was broadcast as part of the PBS series NOVA on 24 January 1989.

Feynman never managed to get to Tuva. Instead of him, the trip was realized by his daughter Michelle, who travelled to Tuva on June 8, 2009.

Leighton stated in 2013 that "The whole Tuvan culture was disappearing because it was outmoded, shall we say, under the Soviet system. They were supposed to build the new Modern Soviet Man, and therefore places like Tuva, which practices shamanism and Buddhism, were seen as backward."
