= Surely You're Joking, Mr. Feynman! =

1985 book of stories about Richard Feynman

- First edition
- Author: Ralph Leighton and Richard Feynman
- Language: English
- Subject: Physics
- Genre: Autobiography, biography, non-fiction
- Publisher: W.W. Norton (US)
- Publication date: 1985 (US)
- Publication place: United States
- Media type: Print (hardback and paperback) also Audio book
- Pages: 350 p. (US hardcover edition) & 322 p. (US paperback edition)
- ISBN: 0-393-01921-7 (US hardcover edition)
- OCLC: 10925248
- Dewey Decimal: 530/.092/4 B 19
- LC Class: QC16.F49 A37 1985
- Followed by: What Do You Care What Other People Think?

"Surely You're Joking, Mr. Feynman!": Adventures of a Curious Character is an edited collection of reminiscences by the Nobel Prize–winning physicist Richard Feynman. The book, published in 1985, covers a variety of instances in Feynman's life. The anecdotes in the book are based on recorded audio conversations that Feynman had with his close friend and drumming partner Ralph Leighton.

== Summary ==
The book has many stories which are lighthearted in tone, such as his fascination with safe-cracking, studying various languages, participating with groups of people who share different interests (such as biology or philosophy), and ventures into art and samba music.

Other stories cover more serious material, including his work on the Manhattan Project (during which his first wife, Arline, died of tuberculosis) and his critique of the science education system in Brazil. The section "Monster Minds" describes his slightly nervous presentation of his graduate work on the Wheeler–Feynman absorber theory in front of Albert Einstein, Wolfgang Pauli, Henry Norris Russell, John von Neumann, and other major scientists of the time.

The anecdotes were edited from taped conversations that Feynman had with his close friend and drumming partner Ralph Leighton. Its surprise success led to a sequel, What Do You Care What Other People Think?, also taken from Leighton's taped conversations. Surely You're Joking, Mr. Feynman! became a national bestseller.

The book's title is taken from a comment made by a woman at Princeton University after Feynman asked for both cream and lemon in his tea, a combination that would just curdle the cream.

=== Cargo Cult Science ===
The final chapter, "Cargo Cult Science", was adapted from Feynman's 1974 commencement address at the California Institute of Technology, in which he cautioned graduates not to minimize the weaknesses of their research in the pursuit of a preferred conclusion. He drew an analogy to the cargo cult phenomenon in the South Pacific Ocean in which, as he understood it, islanders built a mock airstrip to cause airplanes loaded with imported goods to land. The cargo cult islanders carved headphones from wood and wore them while sitting in handmade lashed-up control towers. They waved landing signals to conjure the cargo planes out of the sky.

Similarly, he argued, adopting the appearances of scientific investigation without a self-critical attitude will fail to produce reliable results. Feynman used the term "cargo cult" to describe situations where people focus on superficial aspects of a process without understanding the underlying principles.

== Reception ==
Feynman's "cargo cult" metaphor was used by Tomasz Witkowski in his criticism of social science and psychology in particular. In the first part of his book Psychology Led Astray, Witkowski asks "Is Psychology a Cargo Cult Science?", pointing out that the growth in the number of psychologists worldwide has been parallel with a decrease in mental health.

Murray Gell-Mann was upset by Feynman's account in the book of the weak-interaction work and threatened to sue, resulting in a correction being inserted in later editions.

Feynman was criticized for a chapter titled "You Just Ask Them?" where he recounts attempting to pick up a woman, insulting her after she refuses his advances.

== Publication data ==
- Surely You're Joking, Mr. Feynman!: Adventures of a Curious Character, Richard Feynman, Ralph Leighton (contributor), Edward Hutchings (editor), 1985, W. W. Norton, ISBN 0-393-01921-7, 1997 paperback: ISBN 0-393-31604-1, 2002 Blackstone Audiobooks unabridged audio cassette: ISBN 0-7861-2218-8

== Citations ==
- Gleick, James (1992). Genius: The Life and Science of Richard Feynman. Pantheon Books. ISBN 0679747044.
