= What Do You Care What Other People Think? =

1988 autobiographical book by Richard Feynman

- First edition
- Author: Richard Feynman
- Language: English
- Subject: Autobiography and biography of Richard Feynman
- Genre: Non-fiction; Biography
- Publisher: W. W. Norton (US)
- Publication date: October 1988 (US)
- Publication place: United States
- Media type: Print (Hardcover & paperback) also audio book
- Pages: 256 pp (US hardcover edition) & 256 pp (US paperback edition)
- ISBN: 0-393-02659-0 (1988 hardcover edition), ISBN 0-393-32092-8 (2001 paperback edition)
- OCLC: 18224735
- Dewey Decimal: 530/.092 B 20
- LC Class: QC16.F49 A3 1988
- Preceded by: Surely You're Joking, Mr. Feynman!

"What Do You Care What Other People Think?": Further Adventures of a Curious Character is an edited collection of reminiscences by the Nobel Prize-winning physicist Richard Feynman. Released in 1988, the book covers several instances in Feynman's life and was prepared from recorded audio conversations that he had with Ralph Leighton, his close friend and drumming partner. It follows the same format established in Surely You're Joking, Mr. Feynman!, published in 1985.

== Overview ==
The book was prepared as Feynman struggled with liposarcoma, a rare form of cancer from which he died in February 1988. The book is the last of his autobiographical works.

The first section presents a series of humorous stories from different periods of his life, while the second chronicles his involvement on the Rogers Commission investigating the Space Shuttle Challenger disaster. In one chapter, he describes an impromptu experiment in which he showed how the O-rings in the shuttle's rocket boosters could have failed due to cold temperatures on the morning of the launch. Later, this failure was determined to be the primary cause of the shuttle's destruction. Feynman's comments on the reliability of the shuttle, published as an appendix to the Rogers Commission's final report, are included. The second section of the book was dramatized in a television movie by BBC/Science Channel titled The Challenger Disaster.

The book is much more loosely organized than the earlier Surely You're Joking, Mr. Feynman! It contains short stories, letters, photographs, and a few of the sketches that Feynman created in later life when he had learned to draw from an artist friend, Jirayr Zorthian.

The titular story of the book focuses on Feynman's first wife, Arline, who had been diagnosed with tuberculosis before their marriage. Its title is taken from a question she often put to him when he seemed preoccupied with the opinions of his colleagues about his work, thereby echoing his own earlier words to her. She died while Feynman was working on the Manhattan Project.

The book concludes with a chapter titled "The Value of Science", an address Feynman gave at the 1955 autumn meeting of the National Academy of Sciences.

== Reception ==
BYTE said "The book makes excellent reading both for its entertaining style and for Feynman's keen insights".

== Editions ==
- Feynman, Richard P., What Do You Care What Other People Think?, 1988, W. W. Norton, ISBN 0-393-02659-0, 2001 paperback: ISBN 0-393-32092-8

== See also ==
- Richard Feynman; § Challenger disaster
