= Ralph Leighton =

American biographer and film producer

Ralph Leighton (/ˈleɪtən/ LAY-tən; born 1949) is an American biographer, and friend of the physicist Richard Feynman. He recorded Feynman relating stories of his life. Leighton has released some of the recordings as The Feynman Tapes. These interviews (available as The Feynman Tapes on audio) became the basis for the books Surely You're Joking, Mr. Feynman! and What Do You Care What Other People Think?, which were later combined into the hardcover anniversary edition Classic Feynman: All the Adventures of a Curious Character. Leighton is an amateur drummer and founder of the group Friends of Tuva. In 1990 he wrote Tuva or Bust! Richard Feynman's Last Journey.

He is credited as associate producer and originator of the concept for the Academy-Award–nominated documentary film Genghis Blues (2000), which came about through the nexus provided by Friends of Tuva.

== Personal life ==
He is the son of the Caltech physicist Robert B. Leighton, who coauthored The Feynman Lectures on Physics. He is married to Phoebe Kwan; they have two children.

== List of publications ==
- Surely You're Joking, Mr. Feynman! (1985)
- QED: The Strange Theory of Light and Matter (1985)
- What Do You Care What Other People Think? (1988)
- Tuva or Bust! (1991)
- Gottlieb, Michael A.; Leighton, Ralph (2006). Feynman's Tips on Physics: Reflections, Advice, Insights, Practice. Addison-Wesley. ISBN 978-0-8053-9063-6.
