= 1963–64 SK Rapid Wien season =

Rapid Wien
1963–64 season
- Coach: Robert Körner
- Stadium: Pfarrwiese, Vienna, Austria
- Staatsliga A: Champions (23rd title)
- Cup: Semifinals
- Inter-Cities Fairs Cup: 2nd round
- Top goalscorer: League: Rudolf Flögel (18); All: Rudolf Flögel (21)
- Average home league attendance: 12,800

The 1963–64 SK Rapid Wien season was the 66th season in club history.

== Squad ==
=== Squad statistics ===
Nat.	Name	League		Cup		Fairs Cup		Total	
Nat.	Name	Apps	Goals	Apps	Goals	Apps	Goals	Apps	Goals
Goalkeepers
(Austria)	Hans-Peter Gürtler			1				1	
(Socialist Federal Republic of Yugoslavia)	Andrija Veres	26		4		4		34	
Defenders
(Austria)	Walter Glechner	26		3	1	4		33	1
(Austria)	Paul Halla	26		4		4		34	
(Austria)	Josef Höltl	25		3		4		32	
(Austria)	Lambert Lenzinger			1				1	
(Austria)	Walter Ludescher			1				1	
Midfielders
(Austria)	Karl Giesser	11		3		3		17	
(Austria)	Gerhard Hanappi	20	1	1	1	4		25	2
(Austria)	Ewald Ullmann	2	1	3				5	1
(Austria)	Wilhelm Zaglitsch	1		3		1		5	
Forwards
(Austria)	Rudolf Flögel	25	18	2	1	4	2	31	21
(Austria)	Toni Fritsch	2		2				4	
(Austria)	Leopold Grausam	14	11	2	2			16	13
(Austria)	Franz Hasil	10	1			3	1	13	2
(Brazil)	Giovanni Luckman			1				1	
(Socialist Federal Republic of Yugoslavia)	Branko Milanovic	16	4	4		2		22	4
(Austria)	Rudolf Nuske	4		2				6	
(Austria)	Peter Rehnelt	10	2	1		2		13	2
(Germany)	Max Schmid	19	10	4	3	3	1	26	14
(Austria)	Walter Seitl	24	13	2	2	4		30	15
(Austria)	Walter Skocik	16	3	3	2	1		20	5
(Austria)	Hans-Georg Tutschek	2						2	
(Austria)	Franz Wolny	7	2	5	2	1	2	13	6

== Fixtures and results ==
Win Draw Loss

=== League ===
Rd	Date	Venue	Opponent	Res.	Att.	Goals and discipline
1	01.09.1963	A	Simmering	1-1	14,000	Krasa 60' (o.g.)
2	07.09.1963	H	Wiener AC	2-0	9,000	Seitl 73', Rehnelt 83'
3	14.09.1963	A	Vienna	2-1	18,000	Flögel 42', Rehnelt 65'
4	21.09.1963	H	Admira	1-0	35,000	Schmid 15'
5	28.09.1963	A	LASK	2-1	15,000	Seitl 13', Flögel 70'
6	05.10.1963	H	Dornbirn	4-0	8,000	Hanappi 23', Flögel 43', Schmid 82' 89'
7	19.10.1963	A	Wiener SC	3-1	30,000	Seitl 12', Flögel 25' 51'
8	03.11.1963	A	Austria Wien	2-3	40,000	Schmid 31' (pen.), Flögel 69'
9	10.11.1963	H	Kapfenberg	5-0	8,000	Grausam 15' 43' 75' 76', Seitl 55'
10	19.11.1963	A	Schwechat	1-1	11,000	Grausam 34'
11	24.11.1963	H	SV Linz	4-0	12,500	Schmid 26', Flögel 26', Grausam 59' 90'
12	01.12.1963	A	Wiener Neustadt	3-1	14,000	Grausam 32', Flögel 43', Seitl 87'
13	08.12.1963	H	GAK	3-1	14,000	Grausam 53', Flögel 75', Wolny 87'
14	29.02.1964	H	Simmering	5-1	10,500	Flögel 53' 69', Milanovic 71', Schmid 77', Skocik 87' (pen.)
15	07.03.1964	A	Wiener AC	0-0	6,500	
16	02.04.1964	A	Admira	4-2	21,000	Schmid 10' 27', Seitl 62', Kolarik 64' (o.g.)
17	05.04.1964	H	LASK	3-2	13,000	Schmid 17', Seitl 51', Flögel 57'
18	19.04.1964	A	Dornbirn	6-2	12,000	Flögel 34' 66' 81', Milanovic 52', Schmid 85', Grausam 88'
19	26.04.1964	H	Wiener SC	2-0	15,000	Seitl 47', Milanovic 55'
20	10.05.1964	H	Austria Wien	2-2	25,000	Grausam 13', Flögel 50'
21	16.05.1964	H	Vienna	1-1	6,500	Skocik 30'
22	24.05.1964	A	Kapfenberg	4-3	4,500	Seitl 28' 51', Milanovic 60', Flögel 70'
23	30.05.1964	H	Schwechat	1-0	7,000	Flögel 34'
24	06.06.1964	A	SV Linz	1-3	2,500	Hasil 83'
25	13.06.1964	H	Wiener Neustadt	3-0	3,500	Skocik 8' (pen.), Seitl 12', Puchegger 42' (o.g.)
26	20.06.1964	A	GAK	4-1	5,000	Wolny 35', Seitl 68' 85', Ullmann 73'

=== Cup ===
Rd	Date	Venue	Opponent	Res.	Att.	Goals and discipline
R1	15.12.1963	A	Wacker Wien	5-0	2,500	Wolny 28', Grausam 36' 63', Schmid 46', Hanappi 77'
R16	15.04.1964	A	Kufstein	2-1	4,000	Schmid 27', Wolny 55'
QF	20.05.1964	H	Wiener SC	3-2 (a.e.t.)	1,635	Flögel 11', Glechner 85', Skocik 115'
SF	17.06.1964	H	Austria Wien	3-3 (a.e.t.)	15,000	Skocik 7' (pen.), Seitl 35' 84'
SF-PO	24.06.1964	A	Austria Wien	1-2	26,000	Schmid 62'

=== Fairs Cup ===
Rd	Date	Venue	Opponent	Res.	Att.	Goals and discipline
R1-L1	11.09.1963	H	RCF Paris (France)	1-0	22,000	Flögel 87'
R1-L2	02.10.1963	A	RCF Paris (France)	3-2	7,000	Flögel 17', Hasil 20', Schmid 56'
R2-L1	06.11.1963	H	Valencia (Spain)	0-0	15,000	
R2-L2	27.11.1963	A	Valencia (Spain)	2-3	35,000	Wolny 5' 62'
