= 1967–68 SK Rapid Wien season =

Rapid Wien
1967–68 season
- Coach: Rudolf Vytlacil
- Stadium: Pfarrwiese, Vienna, Austria
- Nationalliga: Champions (25th title)
- Cup: Winner (6th title)
- European Cup: Round of 16
- Top goalscorer: League: Johnny Bjerregaard (23); All: Johnny Bjerregaard (25)
- Average home league attendance: 11,000

The 1967–68 SK Rapid Wien season was the 70th season in club history.

== Squad ==
=== Squad statistics ===
Nat.	Name	Age	League		Cup		European Cup		Total		Discipline
Nat.	Name	Age	Apps	Goals	Apps	Goals	Apps	Goals	Apps	Goals	Sent off (straight red)
Goalkeepers
(Austria)	Gerald Fuchsbichler	23	24		4		4		32		
(Austria)	Roman Pichler	26	2+1		1				3+1		
Defenders
(Austria)	Walter Baier	25	5+2				1		6+2		
(Austria)	Günther Brabetz	24	1						1		
(Austria)	Erich Fak	22	22+1		4		2		28+1		
(Austria)	Walter Gebhardt	21	21		5		4		30		
(Austria)	Walter Glechner	28	25		5		3		33		
Midfielders
(Austria)	Franz Hasil	22	16+4	2	3		2	1	21+4	3	
(Austria)	Walter Skocik	26	21+1	1	5		4		30+1	1	
(Austria)	Alfred Traxler	19	0+1						0+1		
(Austria)	Ewald Ullmann	24	19	4	3+1		4		26+1	4	
Forwards
(Denmark)	Johnny Bjerregaard	24	26	23	4	2	4		34	25	
(Austria)	Rudolf Flögel	27	25	8	4	2	4	2	33	12	
(Austria)	Toni Fritsch	21	25	5	5	1	4		34	6	
(Austria)	Leopold Grausam	24	25	11	4+1	1	4	1	33+1	13	1
(Austria)	Günter Kaltenbrunner	23	21+1	14	5	4			26+1	18	
(Austria)	Walter Seitl	26	7+5	4	3+1	2	4	1	14+6	7	
(Austria)	Gerhard Springer	18	1	1	0+1				1+1	1	

== Fixtures and results ==
Win Draw Loss

=== League ===
Rd	Date	Venue	Opponent	Res.	Att.	Goals and discipline
1	19.08.1967	A	Sturm Graz	5-2	10,000	Grausam 5', Bjerregaard 20' 35', Fritsch 29' 45'
2	26.08.1967	H	Austria Salzburg	7-0	10,000	Ullmann 25' 85', Grausam 26' 40' 41', Bjerregaard 68' 87'
3	01.09.1967	A	Austria Wien	3-0	60,000	Bjerregaard 47', Grausam 65', Ullmann 73'
4	10.09.1967	A	SW Bregenz	1-3	5,000	Seitl 90'
5	27.09.1967	H	Austria Klagenfurt	5-1	6,000	Bjerregaard 18' 39' 84', Flögel 23', Seitl 46'; Grausam (red card)
6	30.09.1967	A	Eisenstadt	3-1	11,000	Flögel 57' 59', Seitl 65'
7	08.10.1967	H	Admira	3-0	14,000	Hasil 7', Seitl 46', Flögel 73'
8	22.10.1967	A	GAK	3-1	12,000	Grausam 31', Fritsch 35', Bjerregaard 69'
9	29.10.1967	H	Vienna	3-0	12,000	Grausam 14', Hasil 41', Bjerregaard 76'
10	11.11.1967	A	Wiener SC	0-1	12,000	
11	19.11.1967	H	Radenthein	5-0	7,000	Kaltenbrunner G. 13' 37' 89' (pen.), Bjerregaard 59' 62'
12	25.11.1967	A	LASK	1-0	20,000	Grausam 24'
13	03.12.1967	H	Wacker Innsbruck	3-1	14,000	Grausam 6', Flögel 41', Kaltenbrunner G. 63'
14	24.02.1968	H	Sturm Graz	4-2	6,000	Bjerregaard 47' 54', Flögel 67', Fritsch 79'
15	02.03.1968	A	Austria Salzburg	2-1	12,000	Bjerregaard 41', Grausam 63'
16	09.03.1968	H	Austria Wien	1-2	22,000	Bjerregaard 15'
17	16.03.1968	H	SW Bregenz	6-0	6,500	Kaltenbrunner G. 4', Bjerregaard 7' 59' 73', Tutschek 40' (o.g.), Flögel 88'
18	24.03.1968	A	Austria Klagenfurt	1-0	6,000	Kaltenbrunner G. 2'
19	30.03.1968	H	Eisenstadt	1-0	11,500	Kaltenbrunner G. 78'
20	06.04.1968	A	Admira	1-1	12,000	Bjerregaard 82'
21	20.04.1968	H	GAK	3-1	12,000	Bjerregaard 3', Skocik 75', Springer 78'
22	04.05.1968	A	Vienna	1-0	22,000	Grausam 65'
23	10.05.1968	H	Wiener SC	2-1	10,000	Kaltenbrunner G. 35' 68' (pen.)
24	26.05.1968	A	Radenthein	3-2	8,000	Kaltenbrunner G. 40' (pen.), Bjerregaard 69' 87'
25	03.06.1968	H	LASK	5-1	12,000	Flögel 35', Fritsch 40', Chico 58' (o.g.), Kaltenbrunner G. 75' 77'
26	08.06.1968	A	Wacker Innsbruck	3-3	15,000	Kaltenbrunner G. 18' 21', Ullmann 84'

=== Cup ===
Rd	Date	Venue	Opponent	Res.	Att.	Goals and discipline
R1	12.08.1967	A	Wiener Neustadt	1-0	5,500	Flögel 58'
R16	26.10.1967	H	Wacker Innsbruck	2-0	12,000	Kaltenbrunner G. 32', Bjerregaard 34'
QF	08.12.1967	H	Austria Wien	4-3 (a.e.t.)	9,500	Kaltenbrunner G. 5', Flögel 42', Seitl 58', Bjerregaard 100'
SF	28.04.1968	A	Wacker Wien	3-0	13,000	Seitl 3', Kaltenbrunner G. 37' (pen.), Grausam 84'
F	23.05.1968	N	GAK	2-0	6,000	Fritsch 26', Kaltenbrunner G. 88' (pen.)

=== European Cup ===
Rd	Date	Venue	Opponent	Res.	Att.	Goals and discipline
R1-L1	13.09.1967	A	Besiktas (Turkey)	1-0	40,000	Flögel 22'
R1-L2	19.09.1967	H	Besiktas (Turkey)	3-0	30,000	Seitl 9', Grausam 43', Flögel 75'
R2-L1	15.11.1967	H	Braunschweig (West Germany)	1-0	60,000	Hasil 54'
R2-L2	29.11.1967	A	Braunschweig (West Germany)	0-2	31,000	
