= 1966–67 SK Rapid Wien season =

Rapid Wien
1966–67 season
- Coach: Rudolf Vytlacil
- Stadium: Pfarrwiese, Vienna, Austria
- Nationalliga: Champions (24th title)
- Cup: Semifinals
- Cup Winners' Cup: Quarterfinals
- Top goalscorer: League: August Starek (21); All: August Starek (23)
- Average home league attendance: 12,900

The 1966–67 SK Rapid Wien season was the 69th season in club history.

== Squad ==
=== Squad statistics ===
Nat.	Name	Age	League		Cup		CW Cup		Total		Discipline
Nat.	Name	Age	Apps	Goals	Apps	Goals	Apps	Goals	Apps	Goals	Sent off (straight red)
Goalkeepers
(Austria)	Roman Pichler	25	26		4		6		36		
Defenders
(Austria)	Walter Baier	24	9		1		2		12		
(Austria)	Erich Fak	21	16		3		4		23		
(Austria)	Walter Gebhardt	20	20	1	3		6		29	1	
(Austria)	Walter Glechner	27	25	1	4		5		34	1	
Midfielders
(Austria)	Josef Höltl	29	8		1				9		
(Austria)	Walter Skocik	25	22	3	4		6		32	3	
(Austria)	Ewald Ullmann	23	23	1	3	1	4		30	2	
Forwards
(Denmark)	Johnny Bjerregaard	23	21	11	3	3	6	4	30	18	
(Austria)	Bruno Blümel	20			1				1		
(Austria)	Rudolf Flögel	26	24	10	4		5	2	33	12	
(Austria)	Toni Fritsch	20	19	3	3		4	1	26	4	
(Austria)	Leopold Grausam	23	19	3	2	1	1		22	4	
(Austria)	Franz Hasil	21	12	2	1	1	5		18	3	1
(Socialist Federal Republic of Yugoslavia)	Tomislav Knez	28	6	2	3		3		12	2	
(Austria)	Peter Rehnelt	23	2	1					2	1	
(Austria)	Walter Seitl	25	17	10	2		5	4	24	14	
(Austria)	August Starek	21	17	21	2	1	4	1	23	23	

== Fixtures and results ==
Win Draw Loss

=== League ===
Rd	Date	Venue	Opponent	Res.	Att.	Goals and discipline
1	27.08.1966	H	Kapfenberg	5-0	8,000	Bjerregaard 11' 57' 85', Gebhardt 42', Fritsch 62'
2	03.09.1966	A	Wacker Wien	2-1	15,000	Bjerregaard 21' 64'
3	11.09.1966	H	Sturm Graz	2-0	10,000	Bjerregaard 6', Skocik 59'
4	24.09.1966	H	Wacker Innsbruck	1-1	13,000	Glechner 12'
5	09.10.1966	A	Wiener Neustadt	4-1	7,500	Bjerregaard 15', Starek 56' (pen.), Grausam 61', Ullmann 69'
6	15.10.1966	H	Vienna	6-1	37,000	Bjerregaard 8' 86', Starek 36' 45' 48' 59' (pen.)
7	22.10.1966	A	LASK	0-4	25,000	
8	05.11.1966	H	GAK	8-1	10,000	Bjerregaard 5', Skocik 20', Knez T. 51' 80', Fritsch 53' 87', Seitl 63', Starek 78'
9	13.11.1966	A	Austria Wien	1-0	35,000	Unknown 18' (o.g.)
10	19.11.1966	H	Wiener SC	0-4	8,000	
11	27.11.1966	A	Austria Klagenfurt	1-0	8,000	Flögel 78'
12	03.12.1966	H	SW Bregenz	0-1	7,000	
13	11.12.1966	H	Admira	4-2	7,000	Starek 32', Flögel 45', Bjerregaard 58', Seitl 85'
14	04.03.1967	A	Kapfenberg	3-0	6,000	Starek 34', Flögel 53' 85'
15	12.03.1967	H	Wacker Wien	5-0	8,500	Unknown 11' (o.g.), Skocik 63', Grausam 84', Starek 86' 89' (pen.)
16	18.03.1967	A	Sturm Graz	4-2	11,000	Starek 34' (pen.) 62' 71', Flögel 35'
17	01.04.1967	A	Wacker Innsbruck	0-3	14,000	Hasil (red card) 66'
18	09.04.1967	H	Wiener Neustadt	1-0	8,000	Starek 52'
19	15.04.1967	A	Vienna	1-0	17,000	Rehnelt 34'
20	29.04.1967	H	LASK	3-0	11,000	Grausam 10', Starek 52' 73' (pen.)
21	06.05.1967	A	GAK	4-2	6,500	Flögel 11' 26' 66', Seitl 74'
22	12.05.1967	H	Austria Wien	4-0	33,000	Starek 9' 56', Seitl 10' 89'
23	20.05.1967	A	Wiener SC	2-5	45,000	Flögel 4', Seitl 86'
24	03.06.1967	H	Austria Klagenfurt	6-0	7,500	Starek 12' (pen.) 55' 78', Unknown 23' (o.g.), Seitl 80', Flögel 89'
25	18.06.1967	A	SW Bregenz	2-0	9,000	Hasil 83', Seitl 89'
26	24.06.1967	A	Admira	3-1	16,000	Hasil 17', Seitl 57' 60'

=== Cup ===
Rd	Date	Venue	Opponent	Res.	Att.	Goals and discipline
R1	30.08.1966	A	Badener AC	3-1	3,000	Bjerregaard 49' 75', Grausam 62'
R16	01.11.1966	H	Austria Klagenfurt	3-1	4,500	Bjerregaard 33', Starek 64' (pen.), Hasil 67'
QF	25.02.1967	A	Vienna	1-0	11,000	Ullmann 45'
SF	03.05.1967	A	Austria Wien	0-1	15,000	

=== Cup Winners' Cup ===
Rd	Date	Venue	Opponent	Res.	Att.	Goals and discipline
R1-L1	24.08.1966	H	Galatasaray (Turkey)	4-0	22,000	Seitl 6' 20' (pen.), Flögel 31', Bjerregaard 61'
R1-L2	07.09.1966	A	Galatasaray (Turkey)	5-3	20,000	Bjerregaard 23' 55', Fritsch 27', Seitl 35' 46'
R2-L1	09.11.1966	A	Spartak Moscow (Soviet Union)	1-1	20,000	Bjerregaard 23'
R2-L2	08.12.1966	H	Spartak Moscow (Soviet Union)	1-0	38,000	Flögel 50'
QF-L1	15.02.1967	H	Bayern (West Germany)	1-0	44,000	Starek 49'
QF-L2	08.03.1967	A	Bayern (West Germany)	0-2 (a.e.t.)	37,000	
