= 1964–65 SK Rapid Wien season =

Rapid Wien
1964–65 season
- Coach: Robert Körner
- Stadium: Pfarrwiese, Vienna, Austria
- Staatsliga A: 2nd
- Cup: Quarterfinals
- European Cup: Round of 16
- Mitropa Cup: 4th
- Top goalscorer: League: Walter Seitl (15); All: Walter Seitl (16)
- Average home league attendance: 11,200

The 1964–65 SK Rapid Wien season was the 67th season in club history.

== Squad ==
=== Squad statistics ===
| Nat. | Name | League | | Cup | | European Cup | | Mitropa Cup | | Total | |
| Nat. | Name | Apps | Goals | Apps | Goals | Apps | Goals | Apps | Goals | Apps | Goals |
Goalkeepers
| (Austria) | Roman Pichler | 12 | | 2 | | | | 1 | | 15 | |
| (Socialist Federal Republic of Yugoslavia) | Andrija Veres | 14 | | 1 | | 4 | | 1 | | 20 | |
Defenders
| (Austria) | Erich Fak | | | 1 | | | | | | 1 | |
| (Austria) | Walter Glechner | 17 | | | | 4 | 2 | | | 21 | 2 |
| (Austria) | Paul Halla | 23 | | 2 | | 3 | | 2 | | 30 | |
| (Austria) | Josef Höltl | 26 | | 3 | | 4 | | 2 | | 35 | |
| (Austria) | Wilhelm Zaglitsch | 5 | | 2 | | 1 | | 2 | | 10 | |
Midfielders
| (Austria) | Gerhard Hanappi | 1 | | 1 | | | | | | 2 | |
| (Austria) | Ewald Ullmann | 16 | | 3 | 1 | 2 | | 1 | | 22 | 1 |
Forwards
| (Austria) | Rudolf Flögel | 25 | 5 | 2 | 2 | 4 | 1 | 2 | | 33 | 8 |
| (Austria) | Toni Fritsch | 7 | 1 | 1 | | | | 1 | | 9 | 1 |
| (Austria) | Leopold Grausam | 8 | 1 | 1 | 2 | 2 | | 1 | | 12 | 3 |
| (Austria) | Franz Hasil | 21 | 2 | 2 | | 4 | | 2 | | 29 | 2 |
| (Socialist Federal Republic of Yugoslavia) | Branko Milanovic | 11 | 1 | 1 | | | | 1 | | 13 | 1 |
| (Austria) | Rudolf Nuske | 5 | 1 | 1 | 2 | 1 | 1 | 1 | | 8 | 4 |
| (Austria) | Peter Rehnelt | 5 | | 2 | 1 | | | | | 7 | 1 |
| (Germany) | Max Schmid | 23 | 8 | 2 | | 4 | | | | 29 | 8 |
| (Austria) | Walter Seitl | 25 | 15 | 2 | 1 | 4 | | 1 | | 32 | 16 |
| (Austria) | Walter Skocik | 22 | 1 | 2 | 1 | 3 | | 2 | | 29 | 2 |
| (Austria) | Franz Wolny | 20 | 6 | 2 | | 4 | 1 | 2 | | 28 | 7 |

== Fixtures and results ==
Win Draw Loss

=== League ===
| Rd | Date | Venue | Opponent | Res. | Att. | Goals and discipline |
|---|---|---|---|---|---|---|
| 1 | 22.08.1964 | H | Wiener Neustadt | 2-0 | 9,000 | Wolny 4', Fritsch 24' |
| 2 | 29.08.1964 | A | Wacker Innsbruck | 0-1 | 16,000 | |
| 3 | 05.09.1964 | H | Wiener AC | 1-1 | 10,000 | Hasil 3' |
| 4 | 12.09.1964 | A | Kapfenberg | 5-2 | 6,000 | Schmid 24' 25', Seitl 56', Wolny 72', Mitterböck 75' (o.g.) |
| 5 | 20.09.1964 | H | Sturm Graz | 3-0 | 8,000 | Wolny 58', Flögel 68', Skocik 76' (pen.) |
| 6 | 03.10.1964 | A | Schwechat | 1-1 | 18,000 | Seitl 47' |
| 7 | 17.10.1964 | H | Austria Wien | 1-0 | 23,000 | Schmid 47' |
| 8 | 25.10.1964 | A | Wacker Wien | 1-1 | 6,500 | Seitl 67' |
| 9 | 01.11.1964 | H | Wiener SC | 1-0 | 26,000 | Seitl 50' |
| 10 | 07.11.1964 | H | LASK | 1-1 | 12,000 | Seitl 77' (pen.) |
| 11 | 14.11.1964 | A | Vienna | 3-1 | 13,000 | Flögel 26', Seitl 86' (pen.), Schmid 89' |
| 12 | 21.11.1964 | H | GAK | 5-0 | 8,400 | Schmid 11' 40' 84', Seitl 20', Wolny 22' |
| 13 | 28.11.1964 | A | Admira | 1-1 | 28,000 | Wolny 12' |
| 14 | 05.12.1964 | A | Wiener Neustadt | 1-0 | 5,000 | Seitl 72' |
| 15 | 13.12.1964 | H | Wacker Innsbruck | 1-0 | 12,000 | Wolny 48' |
| 16 | 13.03.1965 | A | Wiener AC | 4-1 | 4,000 | Seitl 58' 65' 70', Flögel 88' |
| 17 | 20.03.1965 | H | Kapfenberg | 2-0 | 5,000 | Nuske 35', Milanovic 82' |
| 18 | 28.03.1965 | A | Sturm Graz | 0-0 | 9,000 | |
| 19 | 04.04.1965 | H | Schwechat | 0-2 | 14,000 | |
| 20 | 11.04.1965 | A | Austria Wien | 1-3 | 30,000 | Seitl 19' |
| 21 | 30.04.1965 | H | Wacker Wien | 2-1 | 7,500 | Schmid 44', Seitl 49' |
| 22 | 09.05.1965 | A | Wiener SC | 1-0 | 25,000 | Hasil 27' |
| 23 | 22.05.1965 | A | LASK | 1-1 | 20,000 | Seitl 31' |
| 24 | 29.05.1965 | H | Vienna | 4-1 | 5,000 | Flögel 5' 80', Grausam 37', Seitl 76' |
| 25 | 03.07.1965 | A | GAK | 0-1 | 10,000 | |
| 26 | 20.06.1965 | H | Admira | 0-2 | 6,000 | |

=== Cup ===
| Rd | Date | Venue | Opponent | Res. | Att. | Goals and discipline |
|---|---|---|---|---|---|---|
| R1 | 15.08.1964 | A | Deutschkreutz | 3-0 | 3,500 | Skocik 27', Flögel 31' 77' |
| R16 | 10.10.1964 | H | Gloggnitz | 7-0 | 3,000 | Rehnelt 40', Grausam 45' 55', Ullmann 47', Seitl 52', Nuske 57' 76' |
| QF | 19.05.1965 | A | Admira | 0-1 | 5,000 | |

=== European Cup ===
| Rd | Date | Venue | Opponent | Res. | Att. | Goals and discipline |
|---|---|---|---|---|---|---|
| QR | 16.09.1964 | H | Shamrock Rovers (Republic of Ireland) | 3-0 | 43,000 | Glechner 28' 62', Nuske 56' |
| QR-L1 | 30.09.1964 | A | Shamrock Rovers (Republic of Ireland) | 2-0 | 40,000 | Wolny 53', Flögel 85' |
| R1-L1 | 18.11.1964 | A | Rangers (Scotland) | 0-1 | 55,000 | |
| R1-L2 | 08.12.1964 | H | Rangers (Scotland) | 0-2 | 70,000 | |

=== Mitropa Cup ===
| Rd | Date | Venue | Opponent | Res. | Att. | Goals and discipline |
|---|---|---|---|---|---|---|
| SF | 23.06.1965 | H | Fiorentina (Italy) | 0-3 | 10,000 | |
| P3 | 26.06.1965 | H | Sparta Prague (Czechoslovakia) | 0-2 | 4,000 | |
