= 1965–66 SK Rapid Wien season =

Rapid Wien
1965–66 season
- Coach: Robert Körner
- Stadium: Pfarrwiese, Vienna, Austria
- Nationalliga: 2nd
- Cup: Runner-up
- Top goalscorer: League: Walter Seitl (15); All: Rudolf Flögel (18)
- Average home league attendance: 10,800

The 1965–66 SK Rapid Wien season was the 68th season in club history.

== Squad ==
=== Squad statistics ===
Nat.	Name	Age	League		Cup		Total		Discipline
Nat.	Name	Age	Apps	Goals	Apps	Goals	Apps	Goals	Sent off (straight red)
Goalkeepers
(Austria)	Roman Pichler	24	12		3		15		
(Socialist Federal Republic of Yugoslavia)	Andrija Veres	32	14		2		16		
Defenders
(Austria)	Erich Fak	20	4				4		
(Austria)	Walter Gebhardt	19	25		5		30		
(Austria)	Walter Glechner	26	8		3		11		
(Austria)	Josef Höltl	28	21		4		25		
(Austria)	Wilhelm Zaglitsch	28	3		2		5		
Midfielders
(Austria)	Ewald Ullmann	22	18		4		22		
Forwards
(Austria)	Rudolf Flögel	25	24	12	5	6	29	18	
(Austria)	Toni Fritsch	19	17	3	2	1	19	4	
(Austria)	Leopold Grausam	22	25	13	5	3	30	16	
(Austria)	Franz Hasil	20	26	7	4	2	30	9	1
(Socialist Federal Republic of Yugoslavia)	Branko Milanović	27	6	1	2		8	1	
(Austria)	Peter Rehnelt	22	18	4	3		21	4	
(Germany)	Max Schmid	29	8		1		9		
(Austria)	Walter Seitl	24	24	15	3	2	27	17	
(Austria)	Walter Skocik	24	26	7	5	1	31	8	
(Austria)	August Starek	20	7	2	2	5	9	7	

== Fixtures and results ==
Win Draw Loss

=== League ===
Rd	Date	Venue	Opponent	Res.	Att.	Goals and discipline
1	21.08.1965	A	Wiener Neustadt	1-3	8,000	Starek 45'
2	28.08.1965	H	Austria Klagenfurt	4-1	8,000	Hasil 19' 85', Flögel 42' 89'
3	10.09.1965	A	Vienna	4-2	12,000	Seitl 8' 15', Flögel 48', Rehnelt 70'
4	18.09.1965	A	Kapfenberg	0-0	6,500	
5	26.09.1965	H	LASK	3-0	20,000	Seitl 44' 70', Rehnelt 81'
6	03.10.1965	A	GAK	4-0	4,700	Grausam 32' 55', Flögel 66', Rehnelt 69'
7	17.10.1965	H	Admira	1-1	13,000	Seitl 13'
8	24.10.1965	A	Schwechat	3-1	5,500	Hasil 17', Flögel 22' 58'
9	07.11.1965	H	Simmering	4-0	10,000	Fritsch 15', Seitl 55' 82', Grausam 68'
10	13.11.1965	A	Austria Wien	1-0	30,000	Seitl 5' (pen.)
11	21.11.1965	H	Wacker Innsbruck	1-1	8,000	Grausam 60' (pen.); Hasil (red card) 61'
12	28.11.1965	A	Austria Salzburg	1-1	9,000	Fritsch 20'
13	05.12.1965	H	Wiener SC	1-1	8,500	Flögel 52'
14	26.02.1966	H	Wiener Neustadt	5-0	8,300	Grausam 38' 43' 73' 80', Rehnelt 75'
15	05.03.1966	A	Austria Klagenfurt	1-0	7,500	Fritsch 83'
16	13.03.1966	H	Vienna	0-0	10,000	
17	29.03.1966	H	Kapfenberg	2-0	8,000	Hasil 31' (pen.), Flögel 55'
18	26.03.1966	A	LASK	2-0	10,000	Seitl 51' 68'
19	02.04.1966	H	GAK	2-2	10,000	Hasil 5', Flögel 50'
20	16.04.1966	A	Admira	1-2	27,000	Flögel 73'
21	30.04.1966	H	Schwechat	6-1	6,500	Skocik 6' 48' 88', Grausam 41', Milanovic 65', Hasil 70'
22	08.05.1966	A	Simmering	3-1	3,000	Seitl 61', Flögel 76', Grausam 82'
23	14.05.1966	H	Austria Wien	3-2	22,000	Skocik 10', Seitl 28' 73'
24	28.05.1966	A	Wacker Innsbruck	3-0	13,000	Seitl 21', Skocik 23', Grausam 63'
25	04.06.1966	H	Austria Salzburg	6-1	7,000	Grausam 35' 80', Hasil 51', Skocik 66' 88', Flögel 75'
26	11.06.1966	A	Wiener SC	2-2	7,500	Starek 15', Seitl 57'

=== Cup ===
Rd	Date	Venue	Opponent	Res.	Att.	Goals and discipline
R1	15.08.1965	A	Villacher SV	10-1	4,000	Hasil 4' 84', Starek 6' 28' 49' 52', Grausam 20', Flögel 22' 56', Skocik 66'
R16	14.09.1965	A	GAK	4-2	9,000	Flögel 10' 51' 89', Seitl 19'
QF	08.12.1965	A	Schwechat	4-3 (a.e.t.)	2,500	Fritsch 7', Grausam 11' 55', Starek 105' (pen.)
SF	04.05.1966	H	Austria Wien	3-0	22,000	Flögel 2', Seitl 58', Geyer 74' (o.g.)
F	08.06.1966	N	Admira	0-1	17,000	
