= 1962–63 SK Rapid Wien season =

Rapid Wien
1962–63 season
- Coach: Robert Körner
- Stadium: Pfarrwiese, Vienna, Austria
- Staatsliga A: 4th
- Cup: Quarterfinals
- Inter-Cities Fairs Cup: 1st round
- Top goalscorer: League: Rudolf Flögel (17); All: Rudolf Flögel (20)
- Average home league attendance: 9,500

The 1962–63 SK Rapid Wien season was the 65th season in club history.

== Squad ==
=== Squad statistics ===
Nat.	Name	Age	League		Cup		Fairs Cup		Total	
Nat.	Name	Age	Apps	Goals	Apps	Goals	Apps	Goals	Apps	Goals
Goalkeepers
(Austria)	Hans-Peter Gürtler	22	11		1		2		14	
(West Germany)	Peter Haas	21	4		2+1				6+1	
(Austria)	Ludwig Huyer	21	11		1				12	
Defenders
(Austria)	Walter Glechner	23	26	1	4		2		32	1
(Austria)	Paul Halla	31	21		4		2		27	
(Austria)	Josef Höltl	25	23		4		2		29	
(Austria)	Walter Ludescher	19	4						4	
(Austria)	Alfred Schrottenbaum	24	12		3				15	
Midfielders
(Austria)	Karl Giesser	33	22		3		2		27	
(Austria)	Gerhard Hanappi	33	25		4		2		31	
(Austria)	Walter Skocik	21	7		1				8	
Forwards
(Austria)	Karl Bader	23					1		1	
(Austria)	Josef Bertalan	27	2						2	
(Austria)	Rudolf Flögel	22	25	17	3	2	2	1	30	20
(Austria)	Franz Hasil	17	14	4	2		2		18	4
(Austria)	Lambert Lenzinger	26	1						1	
(Austria)	Kurt Neumer		1						1	
(Austria)	Rudolf Nuske	19	5	1					5	1
(Austria)	Peter Rehnelt	19	19	4	4	3	1		24	7
(West Germany)	Max Schmid	26	19	8	2		2		23	8
(Austria)	Walter Seitl	21	17	6	2	1	1		20	7
(Austria)	Hans-Georg Tutschek	20	1						1	
(Austria)	Franz Wolny	22	16	10	4	2	1		21	12

== Fixtures and results ==
Win Draw Loss

=== League ===
Rd	Date	Venue	Opponent	Res.	Att.	Goals and discipline
1	25.08.1962	A	Wiener SC	0-1	73,000	
2	01.09.1962	H	Schwechat	2-3	12,000	Flögel 32', Schmid 40'
3	09.09.1962	A	Wiener AC	2-1	30,000	Rehnelt 53', Flögel 58'
4	22.09.1962	H	Admira	2-1	11,000	Seitl 14', Flögel 50'
5	29.09.1962	A	SV Linz	3-0	10,000	Wolny 25', Hasil 30', Flögel 88'
6	07.10.1962	H	Simmering	1-0	11,000	Schmid 20'
7	14.10.1962	A	GAK	3-1	10,000	Schmid 2', Flögel 17', Wolny 44'
8	20.10.1962	H	Austria Klagenfurt	4-0	12,000	Hasil 24' 78', Wolny 32', Schmid 81' (pen.)
9	03.11.1962	A	Wacker Wien	8-0	14,000	Schmid 14' 60', Flögel 40' 50' 70' 88', Wolny 61', Walzhofer 84' (o.g.)
10	17.11.1962	A	LASK	0-1	26,000	
11	30.12.1962	H	Vienna	0-1	9,000	
12	08.12.1962	A	Austria Wien	0-0	42,000	
13	23.12.1962	H	Austria Salzburg	3-1	3,000	Seitl 27' 54', Rehnelt 85'
14	16.03.1963	H	Wiener SC	3-3	15,000	Flögel 7' 44', Wolny 15'
15	24.03.1963	A	Schwechat	2-1	7,000	Wolny 43' 82'
16	31.03.1963	H	Wiener AC	5-1	8,000	Flögel 25' 36' 44', Hasil 75', Wolny 81'
17	06.04.1963	A	Admira	0-0	7,000	
18	21.04.1963	H	SV Linz	4-0	9,000	Wolny 29' 37', Flögel 33', Rehnelt 60'
19	27.04.1963	A	Simmering	1-4	6,500	Flögel 88'
20	05.05.1963	H	GAK	0-1	7,000	
21	12.05.1963	A	Austria Klagenfurt	0-2	5,000	
22	19.05.1963	H	Wacker Wien	1-3	9,000	Rehnelt 5'
23	25.05.1963	H	LASK	1-0	7,000	Flögel 17'
24	01.06.1963	A	Vienna	2-2	4,200	Seitl 62', Glechner 66'
25	12.06.1963	H	Austria Wien	3-0	11,000	Seitl 24', Nuske 47', Schmid 65'
26	16.06.1963	A	Austria Salzburg	2-1		Seitl 9', Schmid 52'

=== Cup ===
Rd	Date	Venue	Opponent	Res.	Att.	Goals and discipline
R1	24.02.1963	A	Austria Klagenfurt	1-1 (a.e.t.)	5,000	Seitl 64'
R1-PO	10.03.1963	H	Austria Klagenfurt	2-1	4,600	Rehnelt 60' 75'
R16	27.03.1963	A	Vienna	5-2	21,000	Wolny 9' 12', Flögel 25' 38', Rehnelt 47'
QF	10.04.1963	A	Austria Wien	0-1	28,000	

=== Inter-Cities Fairs Cup ===
Rd	Date	Venue	Opponent	Res.	Att.	Goals and discipline
R1-L1	10.10.1962	H	Crvena Zvezda (Socialist Federal Republic of Yugoslavia)	1-1	20,000	Flögel 49'
R1-L2	13.11.1962	A	Crvena Zvezda (Socialist Federal Republic of Yugoslavia)	0-1	15,000	
