= 1969–70 SK Rapid Wien season =

Rapid Wien
1969–70 season
- Coach: Robert Körner
- Stadium: Pfarrwiese, Vienna, Austria
- Nationalliga: 6th
- Cup: Round of 16
- Cup Winners' Cup: 1st round
- Top goalscorer: League: Johnny Bjerregaard (20); All: Johnny Bjerregaard (25)
- Average home league attendance: 7,200

The 1969–70 SK Rapid Wien season was the 72nd season in club history.

== Squad ==
=== Squad statistics ===
Nat.	Name	Age	League		Cup		CW Cup		Total	
Nat.	Name	Age	Apps	Goals	Apps	Goals	Apps	Goals	Apps	Goals
Goalkeepers
(Austria)	Gerald Fuchsbichler	25	25+1		2		4		31+1	
(Austria)	Josef Reisinger	20	5+1						5+1	
Defenders
(Austria)	Hans Eigenstiller	26	9+1	1	1		4		14+1	1
(Austria)	Erich Fak	24	25		1		1		27	
(Austria)	Walter Gebhardt	23	26+1		2		4		32+1	
(Austria)	Walter Glechner	30	27	1	1		4		32	1
(Austria)	Ewald Ullmann	26	22+1		1+1		3		26+2	
(Austria)	Stefan Vasgyura	19	4						4	
(Austria)	Christoph Wirth	26	4+1		1		1+1		6+2	
Midfielders
(Austria)	Rudolf Flögel	29	28+1	2	2		4	1	34+1	3
(Austria)	Alois Jagodic	23	18+5		2		3+1		23+6	
(Austria)	Werner Walzer	21	12+4		1				13+4	
Forwards
(Denmark)	Johnny Bjerregaard	26	30	20	2	3	4	2	36	25
(Austria)	Toni Fritsch	23	16+1	2	1		2+1		19+2	2
(Austria)	Geza Gallos	20	18+6	5	2		1+3		21+9	5
(Austria)	Leopold Grausam	26	17+10	7	0+1		3+1		20+12	7
(Austria)	Hannes Hartl	22	11+2	1	1		2		14+2	1
(Austria)	Helmut Redl	29	30	12	2	1	4	1	36	14
(Austria)	Karl Sturm	17	3	1					3	1

== Fixtures and results ==
Win Draw Loss

=== League ===
Rd	Date	Venue	Opponent	Res.	Att.	Goals and discipline
1	23.08.1969	H	Vienna	0-0	14,000	
2	30.08.1969	H	GAK	2-0	5,000	Eigenstiller 25', Grausam 52'
3	07.09.1969	A	Austria Klagenfurt	0-0	7,000	
4	10.09.1969	H	Eisenstadt	5-0	5,128	Bjerregaard 13' 52', Flögel 20', Redl 45' 57'
5	13.09.1969	A	VÖEST Linz	0-1	8,000	
6	27.09.1969	H	Wiener SC	1-2	12,263	Bjerregaard 88'
7	04.10.1969	A	Wacker Innsbruck	1-3	10,000	Gallos 69'
8	11.10.1969	H	Austria Wien	0-6	16,000	
9	18.10.1969	A	Wacker Wien	2-2	14,000	Grausam 64', Flögel 66'
10	25.10.1969	H	Sturm Graz	2-1	10,000	Bjerregaard 21', Grausam 67'
11	08.11.1969	A	Austria Salzburg	1-2	13,000	Bjerregaard 68'
12	15.11.1969	H	Dornbirn	6-0	5,500	Bjerregaard 18' 48' 68' (pen.), Redl 20' 86', Gallos 87'
13	22.11.1969	A	LASK	1-0	15,000	Redl 85'
14	29.11.1969	H	Admira	1-1	5,500	Redl 44'
15	06.12.1969	A	Wattens	2-1	1,200	Bjerregaard 40' 81'
16	14.02.1970	A	Vienna	0-1	5,000	
17	21.02.1970	A	GAK	1-1	4,900	Bjerregaard 60' (pen.)
18	28.02.1970	H	Austria Klagenfurt	6-0	2,000	Redl 14' 90+1', Fritsch 17' 88', Bjerregaard 67' (pen.) 79'
19	15.04.1970	A	Eisenstadt	3-0	5,000	Gallos 17', Bjerregaard 67', Redl 69'
20	13.05.1970	H	VÖEST Linz	6-1	5,000	Grausam 17' 43' 75', Bjerregaard 50' 88', Redl 60'
21	21.03.1970	A	Wiener SC	0-1	12,000	
22	28.03.1970	H	Wacker Innsbruck	0-2	5,000	
23	18.04.1970	A	Austria Wien	2-2	15,000	Sturm K. 20', Glechner 37'
24	25.04.1970	H	Wacker Wien	1-2	8,000	Redl 82'
25	01.05.1970	A	Sturm Graz	0-2	10,000	
26	09.05.1970	H	Austria Salzburg	4-1	6,000	Bjerregaard 59', Gallos 71' 89', Redl 87'
27	16.05.1970	A	Dornbirn	1-1	4,000	Hartl H. 46'
28	23.05.1970	H	LASK	1-0	5,000	Bjerregaard 77'
29	05.06.1970	A	Admira	1-2	7,000	Bjerregaard 60'
30	13.06.1970	H	Wattens	2-0	3,800	Grausam 34', Bjerregaard 50'

=== Cup ===
Rd	Date	Venue	Opponent	Res.	Att.	Goals and discipline
R1	09.08.1969	A	Urfahr	1-0	4,000	Bjerregaard 11'
R16	08.02.1970	H	Wacker Innsbruck	3-5	5,200	Bjerregaard 3' 51', Redl 80'

=== European Cup ===
Rd	Date	Venue	Opponent	Res.	Att.	Goals and discipline
Q1-L1	27.08.1969	H	Torpedo Moscow (Soviet Union)	0-0	20,000	
Q1-L2	03.09.1969	A	Torpedo Moscow (Soviet Union)	1-1	80,000	Redl 56'
R1-L1	17.09.1969	H	PSV (Netherlands)	1-2	52,000	Bjerregaard 20' (pen.)
R1-L2	01.10.1969	A	PSV (Netherlands)	2-4	22,000	Flögel 25', Bjerregaard 76'
