= 1961–62 SK Rapid Wien season =

Rapid Wien
1961–62 season
- Coach: Robert Körner
- Stadium: Pfarrwiese, Vienna, Austria
- Staatsliga A: 5th
- Cup: Quarterfinals
- Cup Winners' Cup: Round of 16
- Top goalscorer: League: Max Schmid (16); All: Max Schmid (20)
- Average home league attendance: 14,800

The 1961–62 SK Rapid Wien season was the 64th season in club history.

== Squad ==
=== Squad statistics ===
Nat.	Name	Age	League		Cup		CW Cup		Total	
Nat.	Name	Age	Apps	Goals	Apps	Goals	Apps	Goals	Apps	Goals
Goalkeepers
(Austria)	Josef Eder	23	12		2				14	
(Austria)	Ludwig Huyer	20	14		1		4		19	
Defenders
(Austria)	Walter Glechner	22	22	4	2		3		27	4
(Austria)	Paul Halla	30	23	1	2	1	4		29	2
(Austria)	Josef Höltl	24	25		3		4		32	
(Austria)	Alfred Schrottenbaum	23	8						8	
(Austria)	Johann Steup	26					1		1	
(Austria)	Wilhelm Zaglitsch	24	5		2		1		8	
Midfielders
(Austria)	Karl Giesser	32	26		3		4		33	
(Austria)	Gerhard Hanappi	32	24	1	3		4		31	1
Forwards
(Austria)	Josef Bertalan	26	16	1	3	1	1		20	2
(Austria)	Robert Dienst	33	2				1		3	
(Austria)	Rudolf Flögel	21	26	12	3	3	4	1	33	16
(Socialist Federal Republic of Yugoslavia)	Branko Milanović	23	7	1			3	1	10	2
(Austria)	Anton Polster	25	2						2	
(Austria)	Peter Reiter	24	18	8	2	1			20	9
(West Germany)	Max Schmid	25	22	16	2	1	4	4	28	21
(Austria)	Walter Seitl	20	7	2			2	1	9	3
(Austria)	Walter Skocik	20	17	7	3		3	1	23	8
(Austria)	Hans-Georg Tutschek	19	3		1				4	
(Austria)	Franz Wolny	21	7	2	1	1	1		9	3

== Fixtures and results ==
Win Draw Loss

=== League ===
Rd	Date	Venue	Opponent	Res.	Att.	Goals and discipline
1	25.08.1961	A	Vienna	4-2	30,000	Seitl 6' 28', Flögel 48' 89'
2	02.09.1961	H	Austria Wien	1-2	64,000	Flögel 7'
3	16.09.1961	A	GAK	2-1	11,000	Wolny 51' 57'
4	23.09.1961	H	SV Linz	1-2	8,000	Flögel 49'
5	01.10.1961	A	Admira	4-0	12,000	Koschier 5' (o.g.), Flögel 7', Schmid 12' 37'
6	15.10.1961	H	SAK 1914	2-0	9,000	Milanovic 41', Flögel 48'
7	22.10.1961	A	Kapfenberg	1-1	6,000	Flögel 52'
8	29.10.1961	A	LASK	0-2	20,000	
9	16.12.1961	H	Schwechat	2-1	1,000	Flögel 7', Bertalan 56'
10	11.11.1961	A	Wiener AC	1-1	9,000	Reiter P. 81'
11	26.11.1961	H	Wiener Neustadt	1-1	4,000	Reiter P. 1'
12	03.12.1961	A	Simmering	2-0	10,000	Reiter P. 15' 82'
13	09.12.1961	H	Wiener SC	4-1	6,000	Schmid 7' 59' 84', Flögel 70'
14	03.03.1962	H	Vienna	1-1	11,000	Hanappi 62'
15	10.03.1962	A	Austria Wien	0-2	45,000	
16	17.03.1962	H	GAK	0-1	4,000	
17	24.03.1962	A	SV Linz	1-2	12,000	Flögel 47'
18	31.03.1962	H	Admira	0-1	10,000	
19	15.04.1962	A	SAK 1914	1-1	5,000	Glechner 67' (pen.)
20	29.04.1962	H	Kapfenberg	5-0	5,500	Schmid 46' 89', Flögel 55', Glechner 88', Halla 90'
21	12.05.1962	H	LASK	3-3	55,000	Schmid 3' 38' 73'
22	20.05.1962	A	Schwechat	3-2	4,000	Schmid 40', Skocik 53' 70'
23	26.05.1962	H	Wiener AC	3-2	8,000	Reiter P. 6' 18', Schmid 85' (pen.)
24	02.06.1962	A	Wiener Neustadt	7-1	3,000	Glechner 7' 37', Skocik 12' 73' 84', Frankolin 19' (o.g.), Schmid 89'
25	09.06.1962	H	Simmering	7-0	7,000	Schmid 28' (pen.), Reiter P. 37' 56', Skocik 44' 69', Flögel 45', Löffelmann 51' (o.g.)
26	16.06.1962	A	Wiener SC	2-2	8,000	Schmid 5' 70'

=== Cup ===
Rd	Date	Venue	Opponent	Res.	Att.	Goals and discipline
R1	26.12.1961	A	SV Linz	5-4	1,000	Bertalan 12', Flögel 47', Halla 67', Schmid 71', Reiter P. 83'
R16	11.04.1962	H	Sturm Graz	2-1	8,000	Wolny 9', Flögel 52'
QF	25.04.1962	A	GAK	1-3	5,000	Flögel 14'

=== Cup Winners' Cup ===
Rd	Date	Venue	Opponent	Res.	Att.	Goals and discipline
QR	13.09.1961	H	Spartak Varna (Bulgaria)	0-0	25,000	
QR-L1	27.09.1961	A	Spartak Varna (Bulgaria)	5-2	20,000	Schmid 8' 85', Skocik 31', Flögel 46', Milanovic 55'
R1-L1	25.10.1961	A	Fiorentina (Italy)	1-3	15,000	Seitl 82'
R1-L2	22.11.1961	H	Fiorentina (Italy)	2-6	17,000	Schmid 88' 89'
