= 1960–61 SK Rapid Wien season =

Rapid Wien
1960–61 season
- Coach: Robert Körner
- Stadium: Pfarrwiese, Vienna, Austria
- Staatsliga A: 6th
- Cup: Winner (5th title)
- European Cup: Semifinals
- Top goalscorer: League: Rudolf Flögel (17); All: Rudolf Flögel (24)
- Average home league attendance: 13,500

The 1960–61 SK Rapid Wien season was the 63rd season in club history.

== Squad ==
=== Squad statistics ===
Nat.	Name	Age	League		Cup		European Cup		Total	
Nat.	Name	Age	Apps	Goals	Apps	Goals	Apps	Goals	Apps	Goals
Goalkeepers
(Austria)	Ludwig Huyer	19	22		5		7		34	
(Austria)	Walter Zeman	33	4				2		6	
Defenders
(Austria)	Walter Glechner	21	26		4		9	1	39	1
(Austria)	Josef Höltl	23	16		5		6		27	
(Austria)	Manfred Reiter	18	1		1		1		3	
(Austria)	Johann Steup	25	16		1		5		22	
(Austria)	Wilhelm Zaglitsch	23	17		3		7		27	
Midfielders
(Austria)	Lothar Bilek	27	8				3		11	
(Austria)	Karl Giesser	31	9		4		4		17	
(Austria)	Gerhard Hanappi	31	25	6	4		9	1	38	7
Forwards
(Austria)	Josef Bertalan	25	24	3	3		7	3	34	6
(Austria)	Robert Dienst	32	13	6	2	2	8	3	23	11
(Austria)	Rudolf Flögel	20	23	17	5	5	8	2	36	24
(Austria)	Paul Halla	29	23	2	5	1	8		36	3
(Austria)	Siegfried Kometer	21	2						2	
(Socialist Federal Republic of Yugoslavia)	Branko Milanović	22	7	1	3	1	4	1	14	3
(Austria)	Rudolf Nuske	17	4	2	2	2			6	4
(Austria)	Johann Reidlinger	27			1	1			1	1
(Austria)	Peter Reiter	23	5	1	3	2			8	3
(Austria)	Walter Seitl	19	11	2	1	1	2		14	3
(Austria)	Walter Skocik	19	23	6	1		8	1	32	7
(Austria)	Friedrich Wolfsbauer	25	6	2	2	3	1		9	5
(Austria)	Stefan Zajic	23	1						1	

== Fixtures and results ==
Win Draw Loss

=== League ===
Rd	Date	Venue	Opponent	Res.	Att.	Goals and discipline
1	20.08.1960	H	Simmering	1-0	15,000	Skocik 82'
2	28.08.1960	A	Dornbirn	3-1	15,000	Flögel 2' 62', Seitl 62'
3	10.09.1960	H	Austria Salzburg	2-1	8,000	Skocik 32', Flögel 50'
4	18.09.1960	A	Schwechat	2-3	10,000	Skocik 49', Hanappi 60'
5	24.09.1960	H	SV Linz	3-1	15,000	Nuske 5', Flögel 36', Skocik 79'
6	02.10.1960	H	Wiener Neustadt	5-1	10,000	Flögel 27' 43' 75' 88', Nuske 37'
7	09.10.1960	A	Wacker Wien	1-0	12,000	Flögel 8'
8	16.10.1960	H	Austria Wien	2-2	25,000	Hanappi 30' 54'
9	23.10.1960	A	LASK	1-5	16,000	Hanappi 66' (pen.)
10	06.11.1960	H	GAK	1-2	29,000	Dienst 46'
11	13.11.1960	A	Vienna	2-4	30,000	Dienst 16', Bertalan 35'
12	27.11.1960	H	Wiener AC	1-1	15,000	Dienst 21'
13	04.12.1960	A	Wiener SC	0-1	16,500	
14	25.02.1961	A	Simmering	2-1	8,000	Dienst 18', Steibl 73' (o.g.)
15	04.03.1961	H	Dornbirn	6-2	7,000	Flögel 16' 85' (pen.), Skocik 25', Dienst 29', Bertalan 30' 48'
16	12.03.1961	A	Austria Salzburg	3-1	11,000	Milanovic 4', Flögel 8' (pen.), Hanappi 52'
17	18.03.1961	H	Schwechat	1-0	12,000	Halla 64'
18	25.03.1961	A	SV Linz	2-3	11,000	Flögel 46', Skocik 76'
19	08.04.1961	A	Wiener Neustadt	0-0	13,000	
20	15.04.1961	H	Wacker Wien	0-3	10,000	
21	22.04.1961	A	Austria Wien	1-2	18,000	Wolfsbauer 26'
22	30.04.1961	H	LASK	3-1	10,000	Flögel 33', Hanappi 43', Dienst 60'
23	07.05.1961	A	GAK	1-0	10,000	Flögel 11'
24	14.05.1961	H	Vienna	3-1	9,000	Flögel 9' 35', Wolfsbauer 60'
25	20.05.1961	A	Wiener AC	0-3	6,000	
26	04.06.1961	H	Wiener SC	3-3	10,000	Seitl 17', Reiter P. 39', Halla 55'

=== Cup ===
Rd	Date	Venue	Opponent	Res.	Att.	Goals and discipline
R1	26.12.1960	H	LASK	4-1	11,000	Nuske, Flögel, Dienst
R16	19.02.1961	H	Bischofshofen	7-2	4,000	Reidlinger, Nuske, Milanovic, Halla, Flögel
QF	11.05.1961	H	Wiener AC	2-1	7,000	Wolfsbauer
SF	01.06.1961	H	Admira	3-1	9,000	Kolarik 4' (o.g.), Wolfsbauer 77', Reiter P. 83'
F	22.06.1961	N	Vienna	3-1	10,000	Flögel 51', Seitl 73', Reiter P. 77'

=== European Cup ===
Rd	Date	Venue	Opponent	Res.	Att.	Goals and discipline
QR	14.09.1960	H	Besiktas (Turkey)	4-0	30,000	Dogan 10' (o.g.), Dienst 20', Glechner 86' (pen.), Bertalan 90'
QR-L1	28.09.1960	A	Besiktas (Turkey)	0-1	20,000	
R1-L1	09.11.1960	H	Wismut Karl-Marx-Stadt (East Germany)	3-1	25,000	Dienst 5', Milanovic 54', Hanappi 63'
R1-L2	23.11.1960	A	Wismut Karl-Marx-Stadt (East Germany)	0-2	35,000	
R1-PO	21.12.1960	N	Wismut Karl-Marx-Stadt (East Germany)	1-0	10,000	Flögel 4'
QF-L1	22.03.1961	H	IFK Malmö (Sweden)	2-0	12,000	Dienst 45', Bertalan 88'
QF-L2	03.04.1961	A	IFK Malmö (Sweden)	2-0	18,000	Bertalan 38', Flögel 84'
SF-L1	26.04.1961	A	Benfica (Portugal)	0-3	70,000	
SF-L2	04.05.1961	H	Benfica (Portugal)	1-1	63,000	Skocik 72'
