= Vienna derby =

Football match between Austria Wien and Rapid Wien

- Austria Wien Rapid Wien
- Other names: Wiener Derby
- Location: Vienna, Austria
- First meeting: 8 September 1911

Statistics
- Total meetings: 349
- Most player appearances: Rapid: Peter Schöttel (48); Austria: ?
- Top scorer: Rapid: Franz Binder (21); Austria: Ernst Stojaspal (14)
- All-time series: Rapid: 140; Drawn: 84; Austria: 125
- Largest victory: Rapid 9-0 Austria (1915)

The Vienna derby (German: Wiener Derby) is an association football local derby match between city rivals FK Austria Wien and SK Rapid Wien from the Austrian capital city of Vienna (Wien). The two sides are the most successful in the country, with more national titles and cups between them than any other Austrian club. They are also two of the most popular clubs in Austria, with fans across the country and abroad. They are the only Austrian sides to have never been relegated; both have been in the top flight of Austrian football since 1911, tied for the second-longest uninterrupted spell in the top flight of any club on the Continent.

The first meeting between the clubs was 8 September 1911 when Rapid beat Austria 4–1. In total 339 competitive games have been played with Rapid the victors on 138 occasions, Austria have won 120 games and 81 have ended in a draw. The fixture is the most played city derby in Europe after the Old Firm in Glasgow and the Edinburgh derby (both in Scotland).

== Rivalry culture ==
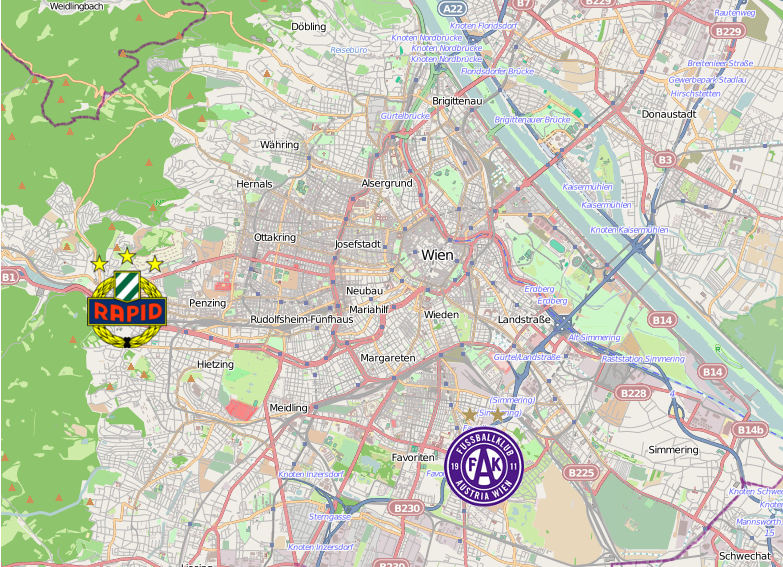
Map showing the stadium locations of FK Austria and SK Rapid until June 2014. Austrias stadium is currently being replaced.

Both clubs come from the Hietzing area, the 13th district, located in Western Vienna. Today however Austria now play at Franz Horr Stadium in the Southern Vienna area of Favoriten (district 10) while Rapid are still located in the West of the city but in nearby Penzing (district 14) at the Allianz Stadion.

Support today is mainly split along geographical divides of north and west (Rapid) and south (Austria) however both clubs have fans throughout the city and across the country. Class has been cited as a traditional means of support with Rapid being supported by the working classes while Austria were the team of the bourgeois of Vienna. Rapid were founded as First Workers Club of Wien compared with Austria who were founded as Wien Amateur Sports Society and incorporated a minimum intelligence requirement into their founding statutes. The class divisions may be coming back into play however as Rapid are currently only one of two Austrian sides run by its supporters. Austria were owned by Frank Stronach until 2008 and changed their name back from Austria Memphis Magna to Austria Wien.

Early Austrian football was dominated by clubs from Vienna and the Wien derby as it is known today was contested by many different clubs, most notably Rapid, First Vienna FC, who are located in the northern district 19 and SK Admira Vienna from district 21 also in the north of the city. The three clubs dominated Austrian football winning every title from 1927-1946 but Admira later merged with other clubs and eventually moved to Mödling, a town south of Vienna. The original Viennese club, First Vienna went into decline after the 1950s and now play outside the top flight. FK Austria became Rapid's main rival in the early 1960s as the two began to dominate Austrian football.

A heavy police presence is involved at matches to keep crowd trouble to a minimum. In 2007, four policemen were injured during fighting between supporters. In 2011 a game was abandoned after Rapid fans invaded the pitch.

== Results ==
As of 11 May 2025.

	Games	FK Austria wins	Draws	SK Rapid wins	FK Austria goals	SK Rapid goals
League	310	103	78	128	461	563
Cup	33	18	3	12	77	67
Super Cup	1	0	0	1	1	3
Total	344	121	81	142	539	633

== Matches list ==
League

This list does not contain results from Cup and Supercup competitions.

Austria Win
Rapid Win
Draw

Season	Date	Home Team	Result	Attendance
1911–12	08-09-1911	Austria	1–4	
1911–12	09-06-1912	Austria	0–3	
1912–13	01-09-1912	Rapid	3–0	
1912–13	09-03-1913	Austria	1–4	4,000
1913–14	31-08-1913	Rapid	4–0	
1913–14	19-04-1914	Austria	1–2	
1914–15	27-06-1915	Rapid	4–1	
1915–16	05-12-1915	Austria	0–4	
1915–16	02-07-1916	Rapid	9–0	
1916–17	08-10-1916	Rapid	4–1	
1916–17	29-04-1917	Austria	1–2	
1918–19	11-11-1917	Austria	1–0	
1918–19	23-06-1918	Rapid	6–1	
1918–19	13-10-1918	Rapid	1–2	
1918–19	30-03-1919	Austria	0–2	2,000
1919–20	24-08-1919	Rapid	1–2	
1919–20	25-04-1920	Austria	2–3	15,000
1920–21	24-10-1920	Rapid	1–0	10,000
1920–21	29-06-1921	Austria	1–1	25,000
1921–22	08-12-1921	Austria	2–3	18,000
1921–22	05-03-1922	Austria	2–1	20,000
1922–23	15-10-1922	Rapid	3–7	50,000
1922–23	03-06-1923	Austria	3–0^{1}	30,000
1923–24	16-09-1923	Rapid	3–1	40,000
1923–24	30-03-1924	Austria	2–2	45,000
1924–25	23-11-1924	Rapid	3–0	25,000
1924–25	01-03-1925	Austria	1–3	27,000
1925–26	15-11-1925	Austria	5–1	15,000
1925–26	09-05-1926	Rapid	0–5	25,000
1926–27	22-08-1926	Rapid	4–1	21,000
1926–27	06-03-1927	Austria	2–1	18,000
1927–28	09-10-1927	Austria	1–2	16,000
1927–28	04-03-1928	Rapid	4–2	12,500
1928–29	25-11-1928	Rapid	2–2	15,000
1928–29	05-06-1929	Austria	1–3	11,000
1929–30	03-11-1929	Austria	2–4	18,000
1929–30	02-03-1930	Rapid	4–8	20,000
1930–31	31-08-1930	Austria	4–2	16,000
1930–31	10-05-1931	Rapid	4–3	8,000
1931–32	06-09-1931	Rapid	5–3	17,000
1931–32	12-06-1932	Austria	2–3	16,000
1932–33	20-11-1932	Austria	2–0	11,000
1932–33	02-04-1933	Rapid	2–0	30,000
1933–34	24-09-1933	Austria	1–0	30,000
1933–34	06-05-1934	Rapid	3–0^{2}	16,000
1934–35	30-09-1934	Austria	1–3	20,000
1934–35	26-05-1935	Rapid	5–2	6,000
1935–36	17-11-1935	Austria	0–2	15,000
1935–36	10-05-1936	Rapid	2–3	9,000
1936–37	20-09-1936	Rapid	1–1	16,000
1936–37	16-05-1937	Austria	5–0^{3}	14,000
1937–38	07-11-1937	Austria	1–2	20,000
1937–38	06-03-1938	Rapid	3–0	21,000
1938–39	16-10-1938	Rapid	5–1	8,000
1938–39	05-03-1939	Austria	4–0	38,000
1939–40	05-11-1939	Rapid	9–2	7,000
1939–40	04-02-1940	Austria	1–4	8,500
1940–41	27-10-1940	Austria	0–3	20,000
1940–41	30-03-1941	Rapid	1–0	20,000
1941–42	11-10-1941	Rapid	2–2	12,000
1941–42	22-03-1942	Austria	3–4	15,000
1942–43	12-09-1942	Austria	1–10	22,000
1942–43	06-12-1942	Rapid	2–6	8,500
1943–44	12-09-1943	Rapid	1–2	25,000
1943–44	26-03-1944	Austria	2–0	7,000
1944–45	15-10-1944	Austria	1–3	15,000
1945–46	04-11-1945	Rapid	0–0	22,000
1945–46	26-05-1946	Austria	1–5	40,000
1946–47	29-09-1946	Austria	0–3	31,000
1946–47	30-03-1947	Rapid	2–3	35,000
1947–48	23-11-1947	Rapid	7–2	55,000
1947–48	06-06-1948	Austria	2–2	44,000
1948–49	24-10-1948	Rapid	1–2	42,000
1948–49	29-05-1949	Austria	5–3	50,000
1949–50	23-10-1949	Austria	4–4	45,000
1949–50	30-04-1950	Rapid	4–2	54,569
1950–51	17-09-1950	Austria	5–7	53,000
1950–51	01-04-1951	Rapid	3–1	60,000
1951–52	26-08-1951	Austria	5–3	53,000
1951–52	09-03-1952	Rapid	3–1	45,000
1952–53	26-10-1952	Austria	2–1	24,000
1952–53	10-05-1953	Rapid	4–1	33,000
1953–54	06-09-1953	Austria	4–3	58,000
1953–54	07-03-1954	Rapid	3–0	52,000
1954–55	05-09-1954	Austria	2–1	35,000
1954–55	06-03-1955	Rapid	3–3	11,000
1955–56	23-10-1955	Austria	1–3	30,000
1955–56	10-05-1956	Rapid	5–3	24,000
1956–57	07-10-1956	Rapid	4–1	30,000
1956–57	12-05-1957	Austria	2–3	25,500
1957–58	10-11-1957	Rapid	4–0	30,000
1957–58	27-04-1958	Austria	1–1	5,500
1958–59	13-12-1958	Austria	1–4	10,000
1958–59	20-06-1959	Rapid	2–1	18,000
1959–60	16-10-1960	Rapid	1–2	25,000
1959–60	05-03-1960	Austria	1–3	17,000
1960–61	16-10-1960	Rapid	2–2	25,000
1960–61	22-04-1961	Austria	2–1	17,000
1961–62	02-09-1961	Rapid	1–2	64,000
1961–62	10-03-1962	Austria	2–0	
1962–63	08-12-1962	Austria	0–0	42,000
1962–63	12-06-1963	Rapid	3–0	21,000
1963–64	03-11-1963	Austria	3–2	40,000
1963–64	10-05-1964	Rapid	2–2	25,000
1964–65	17-10-1964	Rapid	1–0	23,000
1964–65	10-04-1965	Austria	3–1	20,000
1965–66	13-11-1965	Austria	0–1	30,000
1965–66	14-05-1966	Rapid	3–2	22,000
1966–67	13-11-1966	Austria	0–1	35,000
1966–67	01-09-1968	Rapid	4–0	33,000
1967–68	09-03-1967	Rapid	1–2	22,000
1967–68	01-09-1968	Austria	0–3	60,000
1968–69	15-12-1968	Rapid	3–4	28,000
1968–69	20-06-1969	Austria	0–2	7,000
1969–70	11-10-1969	Rapid	0–6	16,000
1969–70	18-04-1970	Austria	2–2	15,000
1970–71	28-11-1970	Austria	1–1	12,000
1970–71	13-06-1971	Rapid	4–1	19,000
1971–72	18-08-1972	Rapid	0–1	12,000
1971–72	13-05-1972	Austria	2–1	17,574
1972–73	18-08-1972	Rapid	1–0	25,000
1972–73	24-03-1973	Austria	2–2	22,000
1973–74	29-09-1973	Austria	1–1	30,000
1973–74	12-04-1974	Rapid	4–0	30,000
1974–75	13-09-1974	Austria	1–3	40,000
1974–75	21-09-1974	Rapid	2–0	27,000
1974–75	12-04-1975	Rapid	1–3	22,000
1974–75	19-04-1977	Austria	1–0	12,000
1975–76	27-09-1975	Rapid	1–1	18,000
1975–76	04-10-1975	Austria	1–1	14,000
1975–76	27-03-1976	Rapid	4–1	22,000
1975–76	22-05-1977	Austria	4–1	11,600
1976–77	14-08-1976	Austria	3–2	13,500
1976–77	20-08-1976	Rapid	0–1	14,000
1976–77	05-03-1977	Austria	1–1	13,500
1976–77	10-05-1977	Rapid	1–0	14,000
1977–78	04-10-1977	Austria	3–2	11,000
1977–78	11-12-1977	Rapid	0–1	15,000
1977–78	05-03-1978	Austria	3–0	16,000
1977–78	06-05-1978	Rapid	0–0	12,000
1978–79	18-08-1978	Rapid	3–1	20,000
1978–79	22-10-1978	Austria	5–1	22,000
1978–79	24-02-1979	Rapid	1–2	13,000
1978–79	28-04-1979	Austria	4–1	6,000
1979–80	06-10-1979	Rapid	0–0	18,000
1979–80	16-02-1980	Austria	0–0	8,500
1979–80	12-04-1980	Rapid	1–1	19,000
1979–80	07-06-1980	Austria	3–2	17,100
1980–81	20-09-1980	Rapid	2–5	20,000
1980–81	19-11-1980	Austria	3–1	8,800
1980–81	28-03-1981	Rapid	5–1	20,000
1980–81	05-06-1981	Austria	0–0	30,000
1981–82	05-09-1981	Rapid	1–1	18,000
1981–82	18-11-1981	Austria	0–1	11,000
1981–82	27-02-1982	Rapid	0–2	13,000
1981–82	04-05-1982	Austria	0–3	29,000
1982–83	27-08-1982	Rapid	0–0	20,000
1982–83	12-05-1983	Austria	0–3^{4}	28,000
1983–84	24-09-1983	Austria	0–0	28,000
1983–84	07-04-1984	Rapid	4–1	16,000
1984–85	03-11-1984	Rapid	2–2	20,000
1984–85	10-05-1985	Austria	1–0	10,000
1985–86	31-08-1985	Austria	0–0	8,500
1985–86	16-11-1985	Austria	1–5	15,500
1985–86	05-04-1986	Rapid	2–0	14,500
1985–86	23-05-1986	Austria	1–3	11,000
1986–87	11-09-1986	Rapid	2–2	15,500
1986–87	15-11-1986	Austria	1–1	17,500
1986–87	11-04-1987	Rapid	1–3	17,500
1986–87	06-05-1987	Austria	0–2	17,000
1987–88	11-09-1987	Austria	1–2	22,000
1987–88	28-11-1987	Rapid	1–2	7,518
1987–88	02-04-1988	Austria	4–2	10,500
1987–88	27-05-1988	Rapid	2–4	8,200
1988–89	03-09-1988	Rapid	0–3	11,000
1988–89	27-09-1988	Austria	1–0	11,000
1988–89	31-03-1989	Rapid	0–0	16,000
1988–89	03-06-1989	Austria	2–1	4,500
1989–90	11-08-1990	Austria	1–4	25,000
1989–90	04-11-1989	Rapid	5–2	8,000
1989–90	10-03-1990	Rapid	6–3	12,000
1989–90	02-06-1991	Austria	0–0	9,000
1990–91	28-08-1990	Rapid	2–0	15,500
1990–91	06-10-1990	Austria	0–3	15,000
1990–91	23-03-1991	Rapid	1–2	16,000
1990–91	02-06-1991	Austria	2–1	16,000
1991–92	31-07-1991	Rapid	1–1	19,500
1991–92	05-10-1991	Austria	5–1	13,000
1991–92	04-04-1992	Rapid	1–0	18,500
1991–92	23-05-1992	Austria	2–1	16,000
1992–93	01-08-1992	Rapid	0–0	8,500
1992–93	07-10-1992	Rapid	2–1	16,000
1992–93	17-04-1993	Rapid	1–5	14,500
1992–93	12-06-1993	Austria	4–0	27,000
1993–94	11-08-1993	Rapid	0–3	18,500
1993–94	09-10-1993	Austria	2–1	15,000
1993–94	12-03-1994	Rapid	1–1	17,000
1993–94	11-08-1995	Austria	2–0	8,000
1994–95	20-08-1994	Austria	1–1	7,900
1994–95	23-10-1994	Rapid	3–1	14,500
1994–95	25-03-1995	Austria	1–1	22,000
1994–95	28-05-1995	Rapid	1–3	18,000
1995–96	05-08-1995	Rapid	1–0	10,000
1995–96	14-10-1995	Austria	4–1	23,000
1995–96	07-04-1996	Rapid	0–1	18,000
1995–96	25-05-1996	Austria	0–2	23,000
1996–97	11-08-1996	Rapid	1–1	15,000
1996–97	23-10-1996	Austria	0–2	18,000
1996–97	09-03-1997	Rapid	3–0	15,000
1996–97	04-05-1998	Austria	0–0	20,000
1997–98	15-08-1997	Austria	0–3	30,000
1997–98	16-11-1997	Rapid	2–0	13,500
1997–98	06-03-1998	Austria	1–1	14,000
1997–98	02-05-1998	Rapid	0–0	10,000
1998–99	08-09-1998	Austria	0–1	18,000
1998–99	15-11-1998	Rapid	3–1	11,300
1998–99	16-03-1999	Austria	1–1	11,500
1998–99	11-05-1999	Rapid	0–0	14,200
1999–2000	31-07-1999	Austria	0–3	16,000
1999–2000	16-10-1999	Rapid	2–0	16,000
1999–2000	03-03-2000	Rapid	1–0	18,500
1999–2000	09-05-2000	Austria	3–0	10,347
2000–01	13-08-2000	Rapid	1–1	18,300
2000–01	01-11-2000	Austria	3–2	11,000
2000–01	04-03-2001	Austria	2–0	10,900
2000–01	06-05-2001	Rapid	2–0	14,400
2001–02	12-08-2001	Austria	2–1	9,536
2001–02	25-11-2001	Rapid	1–1	6,718
2001–02	06-03-2002	Rapid	1–1	12,204
2001–02	24-04-2002	Austria	1–1	10,376
2002–03	07-08-2002	Austria	1–1	10,497
2002–03	27-10-2002	Rapid	1–2	14,433
2002–03	09-03-2003	Rapid	1–1	15,241
2002–03	18-05-2003	Austria	0–0	9,253
2003–04	17-08-2003	Rapid	2–2	17,236
2003–04	29-10-2003	Austria	2–0	10,305
2003–04	13-03-2004	Austria	1–1	9,303
2003–04	02-05-2004	Rapid	1–2	17,483
2004–05	01-08-2004	Austria	1–1	10,606
2004–05	24-10-2004	Rapid	1–1	17,326
2004–05	13-03-2005	Austria	1–0	9,980
2004–05	26-05-2005	Rapid	0–1	46,076
2005–06	07-08-2005	Rapid	3–1	17,467
2005–06	23-10-2005	Austria	0–2	9,976
2005–06	05-03-2006	Rapid	0–3	19,262
2005–06	23-04-2006	Austria	3–1	10,910
2006–07	12-08-2006	Austria	0–0	9,998
2006–07	04-11-2006	Rapid	1–1	16,504
2006–07	04-03-2007	Austria	2–1	10,534
2006–07	08-05-2007	Rapid	3–0	16,063
2007–08	05-08-2007	Rapid	0–0	16,328
2007–08	21-10-2007	Austria	2–2	10,318
2007–08	25-11-2007	Austria	0–0	9,526
2007–08	18-03-2008	Rapid	2–0	16,088
2008–09	24-08-2008	Rapid	3–0	17,344
2008–09	11-11-2008	Austria	2–0	11,221
2008–09	07-12-2008	Austria	2–2	11,205
2008–09	26-04-2009	Rapid	3–2	16,777
2009–10	30-08-2009	Austria	1–1	11,795
2009–10	22-11-2009	Rapid	4–1	16,904
2009–10	14-03-2010	Rapid	2–0	15,947
2009–10	05-05-2010	Austria	1–0	12,369
2010–11	12-09-2010	Rapid	0–1	17,500
2010–11	28-11-2010	Austria	0–1	11,825
2010–11	13-03-2011	Austria	0–1	12,200
2010–11	22-05-2011	Rapid	0–3^{5}	17,500
2011–12	21-08-2011	Rapid	0–3	30,111
2011–12	23-10-2011	Austria	1–1	10,770
2011–12	15-02-2012	Rapid	0–0	27,953
2011–12	19-04-2012	Austria	0–0	10,791
2012–13	05-08-2012	Rapid	0–3	17,024
2012–13	21-10-2012	Austria	2–0	11,102
2012–13	17-02-2013	Rapid	1–2	16,711
2012–13	21-04-2013	Austria	2–2	10,911
2013–14	11-08-2013	Rapid	0–0	16,118
2013–14	27-10-2013	Austria	0–1	9,894
2013–14	09-02-2014	Rapid	3–1	16,765
2013–14	06-04-2014	Austria	0–1	11,327
2014–15	30-08-2014	Austria	2–2	9,082
2014–15	09-11-2014	Rapid	2–3	28,208
2014–15	06-03-2015	Austria	2–1	9,426
2014–15	17-05-2015	Rapid	4–1	29,050
2015–16	12-08-2015	Austria	2–5	10,813
2015–16	25-10-2015	Rapid	1–2	31,700
2015–16	14-02-2016	Austria	0–3	10,590
2015–16	17-04-2016	Rapid	1–0	25,700
2016–17	07-08-2016	Austria	1–4	15,328
2016–17	29-10-2016	Rapid	0–2	25,421
2016–17	12-02-2017	Austria	1–1	15,577
2016–17	23-04-2017	Rapid	0–2	26,100
2017–18	06-08-2017	Rapid	2–2	26,000
2017–18	11-10-2017	Austria	0–1	14,189
2017–18	04-02-2018	Rapid	1–1	25,177
2017–18	15-04-2018	Austria	0–4	11,267
2018–19	16-09-2018	Rapid	0–1	25,021
2018–19	16-12-2018	Austria	6–1	
2019–20	01-09-2019	Austria	1–3	12,723
2019–20	08-12-2019	Rapid	2–2	25,095
2020–21	29-11-2020	Rapid	1–1	
2020–21	07-03-2021	Austria	0–0	
2021–22	29-08-2021	Austria	1–1	10,851
2021–22	05-12-2021	Rapid	1–1	
2021–22	20-03-2022	Rapid	1–1	25,155
2021–22	08-05-2022	Austria	1–1	13,440
2022–23	09-10-2022	Rapid	1–2	25,946
2022–23	19-03-2023	Austria	2–0	15,122
2022–23	16-04-2023	Rapid	3–3	
2022–23	14-05-2023	Austria	3–1	
2023–24	01-10-2023	Austria	0–0	15,112
2023–24	25-02-2024	Rapid	3–0	26,000
2024-25	22-09-2024	Rapid	2–1	26,000
2024-25	16-02-2025	Austria	2–1	15,300
2024-25	13-04-2025	Rapid	2–0	26,669
2024-25	11-05-2025	Austria	1–2	14,622
2025–26	28-09-2025	Rapid	1–3	26,000
2025–26	15-02-2026	Austria	2–0	
2025–26	10-05-2026	Rapid	0–2	
2026–27	01-11-2026	Austria	0–2	

- ^{1} Abandoned after 30 minutes - original score 2–0.
- ^{2} Austria went off after 67 minutes - original score 2–2.
- ^{3} Abandoned after 80 minutes.
- ^{4} The 12-05-1983 match was a replay after the original match held on 26-03-1983 (final result 0–1) was annulled.
- ^{5} The 22-05-2011 match was awarded to Austria by a score of 0–3. The original match had been suspended after 26 minutes and a 0–2 lead for Austria when Rapid supporters stormed the pitch.

=== Top Goal scorers ===
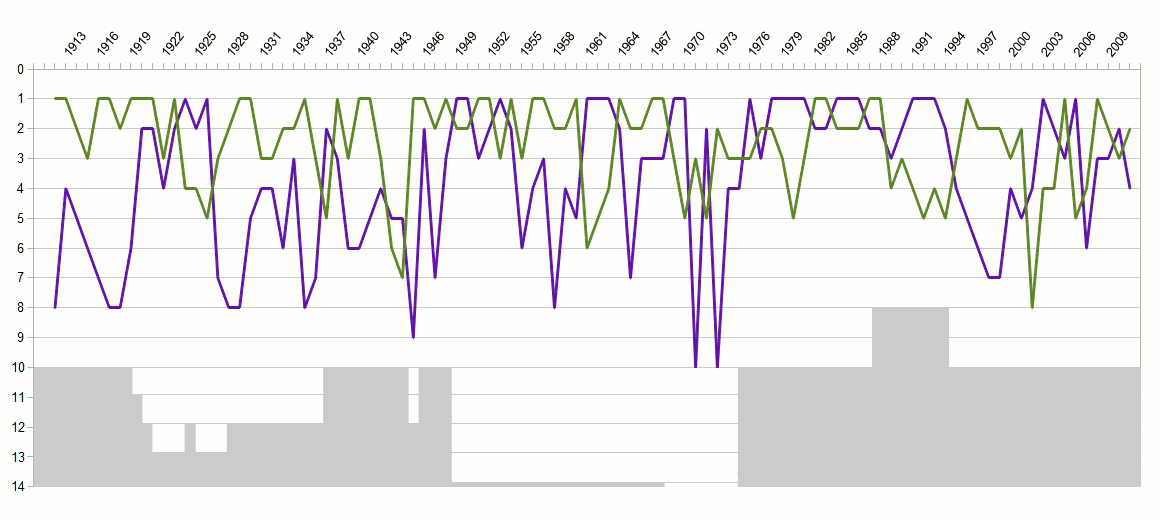
Chart showing the finishing league positions of FK Austria and SK Rapid from 1912 until 2012

	Player	Club(s)	League	Cup	Super Cup	Total
(Austria)	Franz Binder	Rapid Wien	21	0	0	21
(Austria)	Hans Krankl	Rapid Wien	19	1	0	20
(Austria)	Franz Weselik	Rapid Wien	17	0	0	17
(Austria)	Edi Bauer	Rapid Wien	15	0	0	15
(Austria)	Robert Dienst	Rapid Wien	14	1	0	15
(Austria)	Ernst Stojaspal	Austria Wien	11	3	0	14
(Croatia)	Zlatko Kranjčar	Rapid Wien	9	4	1	14
(Austria)	Matthias Kaburek	Rapid Wien	12	0	0	12
(Germany)	Steffen Hofmann	Rapid Wien	12	0	0	12
(Austria)	Toni Polster	Austria Wien	7	4	1	12
(Austria)	Robert Körner	Rapid Wien	11	0	0	11
(Austria)	Ferdinand Wesely	Rapid Wien	11	0	0	11
(Austria)	Andreas Ogris	Austria Wien	10	1	0	11
(Austria)	Rudi Flögel	Rapid Wien	7	4	0	11
(Austria)	Walter Seitl	Rapid Wien	7	4	0	11
(Uruguay)	Julio Morales	Austria Wien	7	4	0	11

=== Most clean sheets by goalkeeper ===
Statistics for league games only from 1965-66 season. Goalkeeper must play entire 90 minutes to be eligible.

	Player	Club(s)	Clean sheets
(Austria)	Michael Konsel	Rapid Wien	13
(Austria)	Herbert Feurer	Rapid Wien	11
(Austria)	Franz Wohlfahrt	Austria Wien	10
(Austria)	Heinz Lindner	Austria Wien	7
(Czech Republic)	Ladislav Maier	Rapid Wien	7
(Austria)	Helge Payer	Rapid Wien	7
(Austria)	Raimund Hedl	Rapid Wien	6
(Austria)	Friedl Koncilia	Austria Wien	6

=== Records ===
==== Results ====
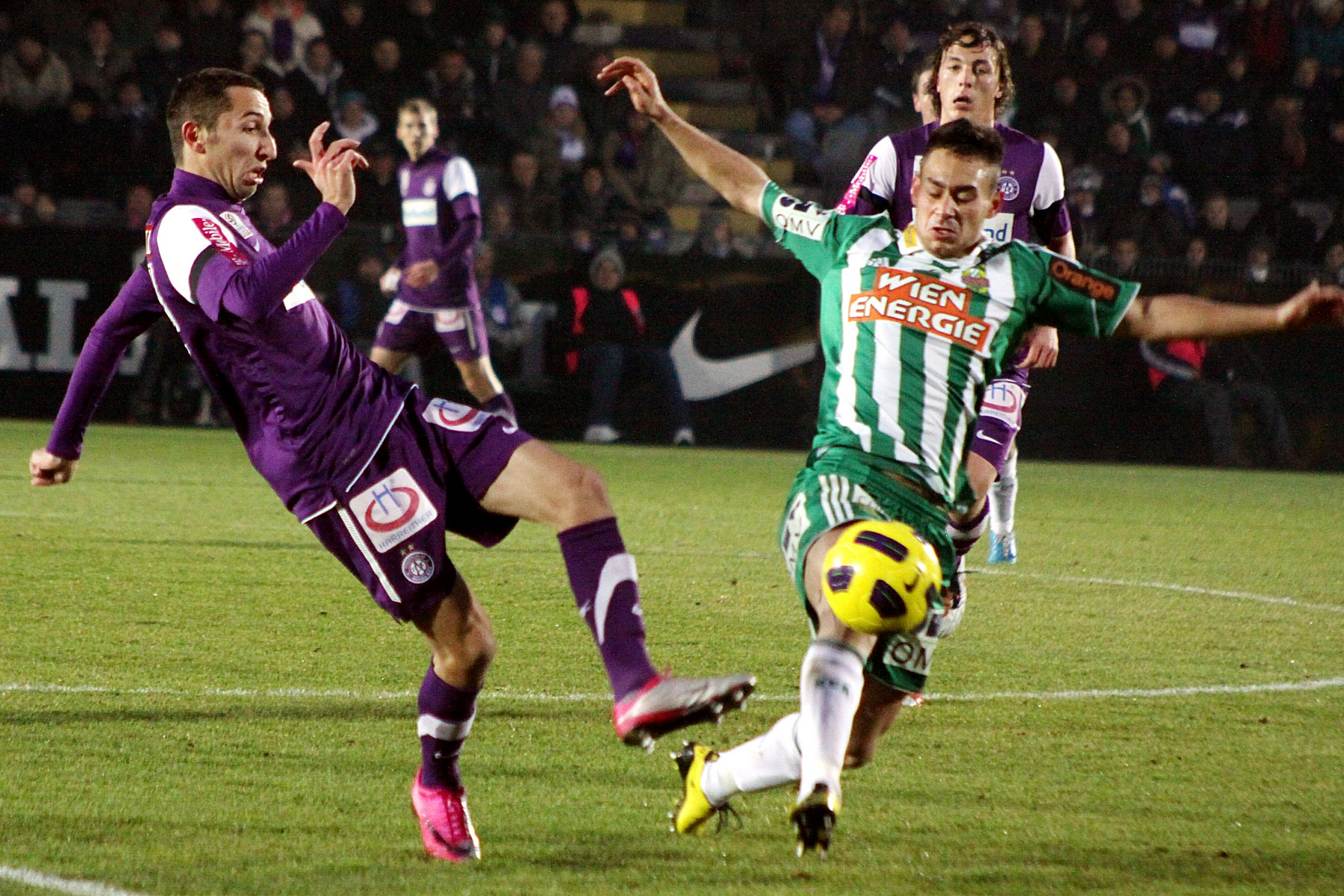
FK Austria Wien (purple) take on SK Rapid Wien (green-white) in Wien derby of 2010

Biggest winning margin

Goals margin	Season	Home	Score	Away
9	1915/16	Rapid	9–0	Austria
9	1942/43	Austria	1–10	Rapid
7	1939/40	Rapid	9–2	Austria
6	1969/70	Rapid	0–6	Austria
5	1917/18	Rapid	6–1	Austria
5	1925/26	Rapid	0–5	Austria
5	1936/37	Austria	5–0	Rapid
5	1947/48	Rapid	7–2	Austria
5	2018/19	Austria	6–1	Rapid

Highest scoring games

Goals total	Season	Home	Score	Away
12	1929/30	Rapid	4–8	Austria
12	1950/51	Austria	5–7	Rapid
11	1939/40	Rapid	9–2	Austria
11	1942/43	Austria	1–10	Rapid
10	1925/26	Rapid	3–7	Austria
9	1947/48	Rapid	7–2	Austria
9	1915/16	Rapid	9–0	Austria
9	1989/90	Rapid	6–3	Austria

==== Trends ====
- Most games won in a row (Rapid): 11, 1911 to 1917.
- Most games won in a row (Austria): 5, 1987 to 1989.
- Most games without defeat (Rapid): 17, 25 May 1996 – 9 May 2000. (including 10 victories)
- Most games without defeat (Austria): 17, 12 August 2001 – 6 August 2005. (including 6 victories)

==== Multiple wins in a season ====
From the 1911-12 season until 1973-74, the clubs played two league fixtures a season. From the 1974-75 season (excluding 3 years from 1982–85), four fixtures have taken place annually during the Bundesliga season. During the home and away format, Rapid won both games 21 times, and Austria won both fixtures on 6 occasions. Neither club has won all four derbies in the modern format.

Club	Amount	Seasons
Rapid	21	1911-12, 1912-13, 1913-14, 1915-16, 1916-17, 1921-22, 1924-25, 1927-28, 1931-32, 1934-35, 1937-38, 1939-40, 1940-41, 1950-51, 1955-56, 1956-57, 1958-59, 1965-66, 1966-67, 1974-75
Austria	6	1922-23, 1943-44, 1948-49,1961-62, 1968-69, 1971-72

== Honours ==
Competition	Austria Wien	Rapid Wien
Austrian champions/ Bundesliga	24	32
Austrian Cup	27	14
Austrian Supercup	6	4
German Championship	0	1
DFB Pokal	0	1
Mitropa Cup	2	2
Total	59	54
