= Todor Veselinović =

Yugoslav and Serbian football manager and player (1930–2017)

- An undated picture of Veselinović

Personal information
- Full name: Todor Veselinović
- Date of birth: 22 October 1930
- Place of birth: Novi Sad, Kingdom of Yugoslavia
- Date of death: 17 May 2017 (aged 86)
- Place of death: Athens, Greece
- Height: 1.72 m (5 ft 8 in)
- Position: Forward

Youth career
- Sloga Novi Sad

Senior career*
Years	Team	Apps	(Gls)
1948–1952	Vojvodina	42	(8)
1952–1953	Partizan	22	(15)
1953–1961	Vojvodina	170	(123)
1961–1962	Sampdoria	15	(4)
1962–1964	First Vienna	41	(15)
1964–1965	Union Saint-Gilloise	10	(1)
1965–1967	Austria Klagenfurt	49	(5)
1968	Proleter Zrenjanin	9	(0)
1969	Srem	11	(2)
Total		369	(173)

International career
1953–1961	Yugoslavia	37	(28)

Managerial career
- 1967: Austria Klagenfurt (player-manager)
- 1969–1971: Santa Fe
- 1971–1973: Colombia
- 1974: El Nacional
- 1974–1977: Vojvodina
- 1977–1980: Olympiacos
- 1980–1981: Apollon Athens
- 1981: Levante
- 1982: Millonarios
- 1982–1984: Yugoslavia
- 1984–1985: Fenerbahçe
- 1985–1986: Apollon Athens
- 1986: Catanzaro
- 1986–1987: Diagoras
- 1987–1988: AEK Athens
- 1988–1990: Fenerbahçe
- 1990–1991: Gaziantepspor
- 1991: Bakırköyspor
- 1992: Panserraikos
- 1993: Karşıyaka
- 1994: APOEL
- 1995: Santa Fe
- 1997: Fenerbahçe
- 1997–1998: Ethnikos Piraeus
Medal record
Silver medal – second place	Olympic Games	1956
- * Club domestic league appearances and goals

Todor "Toza" Veselinović (Serbian Cyrillic: Тодор Тоза Веселиновић; 22 October 1930 – 17 May 2017) was a Yugoslav and Serbian football manager and player.

A prolific forward, Veselinović spent most of his playing career at Vojvodina and became the club's all-time leading scorer. He also ranks as the sixth-highest scorer in the history of the Yugoslav First League with 145 goals. In his early 30s, Veselinović moved abroad and played in three countries, most notably in Austria.

Internationally, Veselinović earned 37 caps and scored 28 times for Yugoslavia between 1953 and 1961, becoming the country's sixth-highest scorer ever. He was also selected for the 1954 and 1958 FIFA World Cups and was part of the squad that finished as runners-up at the 1956 Summer Olympics.

During his extensive managerial career that spanned 30 years, Veselinović took charge of numerous clubs, mostly in Greece and Turkey. He also managed the national teams of Colombia (1971–1973) and Yugoslavia (1982–1984).

== Club career ==
Born in Novi Sad, Veselinović began his career with Vojvodina (known as Sloga at the time), making his senior debut in the 1948–49 Yugoslav First League, as the club suffered relegation to the Yugoslav Second League. He helped them bounce back to the top flight after finishing as runners-up in the second tier the next year. In 1962, Veselinović joined the Yugoslav Army in Belgrade and simultaneously played for Partizan, finishing as one of their best scorers that season. He subsequently returned to Vojvodina, going on to spend eight full seasons with the club, becoming the Yugoslav First League top scorer on four occasions (1955–56, 1956–57, 1957–58, and 1960–61).

In 1961, Veselinović moved abroad to Italy, alongside Vujadin Boškov, spending one season in Serie A with Sampdoria. He then played two seasons at Austrian club First Vienna, before joining Belgian side Union Saint-Gilloise. In 1965, Veselinović returned to Austria and signed with Austria Klagenfurt, remaining with them through 1967. He also served as the club's player-manager over the final few months of his stay. Upon returning to his homeland, Veselinović made nine appearances with Proleter Zrenjanin in the second half of the 1967–68 Yugoslav First League. He was lastly suiting up for Srem in the Yugoslav Second League in the spring of 1969.

== International career ==
At international level, Veselinović was capped 37 times and scored 28 goals for Yugoslavia. He recorded his national team debut in a 3–1 away friendly win over Belgium on 14 May 1953 and netted his first goal on 18 October 1953 in a 3–1 home friendly win over France.

An unused substitute at the 1954 FIFA World Cup, Veselinović was Yugoslavia's top scorer in the 1958 FIFA World Cup with three goals, as the team reached the quarter-finals. He also helped his nation to a runner-up finish at the 1956 Melbourne Olympics, ending as the tournament's joint top scorer with four goals. On 4 June 1961, Veselinović made his final appearance in a 2–1 home win over Poland in a World Cup qualifier.

== Managerial career ==
After initially retiring with Proleter Zrenjanin in 1968, Veselinović took up the role as the club's technical director, but departed after several months. He definitely hang up his boots in 1969 and soon went to Colombia to pursue his managerial career. Over the next two years, Veselinović served as manager of Santa Fe. He was then manager of the Colombia national team between 1971 and 1973, qualifying for the 1972 Summer Olympics.

Between 1977 and 1980, Veselinović managed Greek side Olympiacos. He joined Segunda División club Levante as manager in August 1981, but left before guiding the team in an official match, as the Valencians were experiencing financial problems.

In September 1982, Veselinović was appointed as manager of the Yugoslavia national team. He narrowly qualified them for UEFA Euro 1984 following a memorable 3–2 home win over Bulgaria at Poljud in December 1983. After exiting the final tournament in the group stage, Veselinović resigned from his position. He subsequently went to Turkey and led Fenerbahçe to the league title in the 1984–85 season. Four years later, Veselinović rejoined the club as manager, winning his second championship in 1988–89.

In early 1994, Veselinović took charge of Cypriot club APOEL. He then served his second term as manager of Santa Fe in late 1995. In early 1997, Veselinović returned to Fenerbahçe until the end of the season. He lastly served as manager of Alpha Ethniki side Ethnikos Piraeus from October 1997 to March 1998.

== Death ==
Veselinović died on 17 May 2017 in Athens, Greece.

== Career statistics ==
=== Club ===
Appearances and goals by club, season and competition
Club	Season	League		
Club	Season	Division	Apps	Goals
Sloga Novi Sad	1948–49	Yugoslav First League	4	0
Sloga Novi Sad	1950	Yugoslav Second League	16	1
Vojvodina	1951	Yugoslav First League	22	7
Vojvodina	1952	Yugoslav First League	0	0
Vojvodina	Total		42	8
Partizan	1952–53	Yugoslav First League	22	15
Vojvodina	1953–54	Yugoslav First League	18	8
Vojvodina	1954–55	Yugoslav First League	24	14
Vojvodina	1955–56	Yugoslav First League	26	21
Vojvodina	1956–57	Yugoslav First League	26	28
Vojvodina	1957–58	Yugoslav First League	24	19
Vojvodina	1958–59	Yugoslav First League	12	8
Vojvodina	1959–60	Yugoslav First League	18	9
Vojvodina	1960–61	Yugoslav First League	22	16
Vojvodina	Total		170	123
Sampdoria	1961–62	Serie A	15	4
First Vienna	1962–63	Austrian Staatsliga	16	9
First Vienna	1963–64	Austrian Staatsliga	25	6
First Vienna	Total		41	15
Union Saint-Gilloise	1964–65	Belgian First Division	10	1
Austria Klagenfurt	1965–66	Austrian Nationalliga	25	2
Austria Klagenfurt	1966–67	Austrian Nationalliga	19	3
Austria Klagenfurt	1967–68	Austrian Nationalliga	5	0
Austria Klagenfurt	Total		49	5
Proleter Zrenjanin	1967–68	Yugoslav First League	9	0
Srem	1968–69	Yugoslav Second League	11	2
Career total			369	173

=== International ===
Appearances and goals by national team and year
National team	Year	Apps	Goals
Yugoslavia	1953	2	1
Yugoslavia	1954	6	5
Yugoslavia	1955	6	5
Yugoslavia	1956	8	7
Yugoslavia	1957	2	0
Yugoslavia	1958	8	8
Yugoslavia	1959	2	2
Yugoslavia	1960	1	0
Yugoslavia	1961	2	0
Total		37	28

== Honours ==
=== Player ===
Partizan

- Yugoslav Cup: 1952

Yugoslavia

- Olympic Games silver medal: 1956

Individual

- Yugoslav First League top scorer: 1955–56, 1956–57, 1957–58, 1960–61
- Olympic Games top scorer: 1956

=== Manager ===
Fenerbahçe

- 1.Lig: 1984–85, 1988–89
