= Tutschek =

Tutschek is a surname. Notable people with the surname include:

- Adolf Ritter von Tutschek (1891–1918), German soldier
- Hans-Georg Tutschek (born 1941), Austrian footballer
