= 2017–18 Austrian Football Bundesliga =

106th season of top-tier football league in Austria

Austrian Bundesliga
- Season: 2017–18
- Dates: 22 July 2017 – 27 May 2018
- Champions: Red Bull Salzburg (12th title)
- Champions League: Red Bull Salzburg; Sturm Graz
- Europa League: Rapid Wien; LASK; Admira Wacker Mödling
- Matches: 180
- Goals: 520 (2.89 per match)
- Top goalscorer: Mu'nas Dabbur (22 goals)
- Longest winning run: 7 matches LASK
- Longest unbeaten run: 22 matches Red Bull Salzburg
- Highest attendance: 25,177; Rapid Wien 1–1 Austria Wien (4 February 2018)
- Lowest attendance: 1,241; Admira Mödling 3–1 Rheindorf Altach (16 December 2017)
- Total attendance: 1,144,961
- Average attendance: 6,360

The 2017–18 Austrian Football Bundesliga was the 106th season of top-tier football in Austria. Red Bull Salzburg successfully defended their last years title.

== Teams ==
LASK, the 2016–17 First League champion, returned to the top level six years after their relegation.

=== Stadia and locations ===
Location of teams in the 2017–18 Austrian Football Bundesliga

Team	Location	Venue	Capacity
Admira Wacker Mödling	Maria Enzersdorf	BSFZ-Arena	10,800
Austria Wien	Vienna	Ernst-Happel-Stadion	50,865
LASK	Pasching	Waldstadion Pasching	7,870
Rapid Wien	Vienna	Allianz Stadion	28,000
Red Bull Salzburg	Wals-Siezenheim	Red Bull Arena	30,188
Rheindorf Altach	Altach	Stadion Schnabelholz	8,500
St. Pölten	Sankt Pölten	NV Arena	8,000
Sturm Graz	Graz	Merkur-Arena	15,323
SV Mattersburg	Mattersburg	Pappelstadion	17,100
Wolfsberger AC	Wolfsberg	Lavanttal-Arena	7,300

=== Personnel and kits ===
Team	Chairman	Manager	Manufacturer	Sponsors
Admira Wacker	(Austria) Philip Thonhauser	(Austria) Ernst Baumeister	Nike	Flyeralarm
SCR Altach	(Austria) Johannes Engl	(Austria) Klaus Schmidt	Jako	Cashpoint
Austria Wien	(Austria) Wolfgang Katzian	(Germany) Thomas Letsch	Nike	Verbund
LASK		(Austria) Oliver Glasner	Forza Ask	Zipfer
Rapid Wien	(Austria) Michael Krammer	(Austria) Goran Djuricin	adidas	Wien Energie
RB Salzburg	(Austria) Rudolf Theierl	(Germany) Marco Rose	Nike	Red Bull
St. Pölten	(Austria) Gottfried Tröstl	(Austria) Oliver Lederer	Macron	Hypo Noe
Sturm Graz	(Austria) Christian Jauk	(Germany) Heiko Vogel	Lotto	Puntigamer
SV Mattersburg	(Austria) Martin Pucher	(Austria) Gerald Baumgartner	Puma	Bauwelt Koch
Wolfsberger AC	(Austria) Dietmar Riegler	(Austria) Heimo Pfeifenberger	Jako	RZ Pellets

== League table ==
Pos	Team	Pld	W	D	L	GF	GA	GD	Pts	Qualification or relegation
1	Red Bull Salzburg (C)	36	25	8	3	81	29	+52	83	Qualification for the Champions League third qualifying round
2	Sturm Graz	36	22	4	10	68	45	+23	70	Qualification for the Champions League second qualifying round
3	Rapid Wien	36	17	11	8	68	43	+25	62	Qualification for the Europa League third qualifying round (Note: Sturm Graz qualified for the Europa League third qualifying round by winning the 2017–18 Austrian Cup. However, since they already qualified for European competition based on their league position, the spot awarded to the cup winners was passed down the league.)
4	LASK	36	17	6	13	49	41	+8	57	Qualification for the Europa League second qualifying round
5	Admira Wacker Mödling	36	15	6	15	59	66	−7	51	Qualification for the Europa League second qualifying round
6	Mattersburg	36	12	10	14	50	56	−6	46	
7	Austria Wien	36	12	7	17	51	55	−4	43	
8	Rheindorf Altach	36	10	8	18	35	51	−16	38	
9	Wolfsberger AC	36	8	9	19	31	57	−26	33	
10	St. Pölten (O)	36	5	5	26	28	77	−49	20	Qualification for the relegation play-offs

Source: weltfussball.de (in German)
Rules for classification: 1) Points; 2) Goal difference; 3) Goals scored; 4) Matches won; 5) Away matches won; 6) Head-to-head points; 7) Head-to-head goal difference; 8) Head-to-head goals scored.
(C) Champions; (O) Play-off winners

== Results ==
=== First half of season ===
Home \ Away	ADM	AWI	ALT	LIN	RWI	RBS	StP	STU	MAT	WOL
Admira Wacker Mödling	—	1–3	4–1	4–2	3–1	1–1	1–0	2–1	2–0	0–0
Austria Wien	2–3	—	2–0	2–0	0–1	1–1	5–1	2–3	1–3	2–2
Rheindorf Altach	2–2	3–0	—	2–4	2–2	0–1	3–0	1–2	1–0	3–2
LASK	3–0	2–2	0–0	—	1–2	1–3	2–0	2–1	2–2	2–0
Rapid Wien	1–0	2–2	1–2	1–0	—	2–3	1–0	1–2	2–2	4–2
Red Bull Salzburg	5–1	0–0	2–0	1–1	2–2	—	5–1	5–0	2–0	2–1
St. Pölten	1–1	1–0	1–2	0–1	1–4	1–3	—	0–3	0–0	0–0
Sturm Graz	6–1	3–0	0–0	1–0	0–0	1–0	3–2	—	3–2	2–1
Mattersburg	0–5	1–3	1–0	1–0	0–1	1–2	1–1	2–3	—	1–0
Wolfsberger AC	2–0	1–2	1–0	0–0	0–0	0–2	2–1	0–2	2–2	—

Source: weltfussball.de (in German)
Legend: Blue = home team win; Yellow = draw; Red = away team win.
For upcoming matches, an "a" indicates there is an article about the rivalry between the two participants.

=== Second half of season ===
Home \ Away	ADM	AWI	ALT	LIN	RWI	RBS	StP	STU	MAT	WOL
Admira Wacker Mödling	—	2–1	3–1	0–1	2–1	2–6	0–2	2–4	1–1	4–2
Austria Wien	0–0	—	2–1	1–3	0–4	4–0	4–0	1–0	2–3	2–0
Rheindorf Altach	1–2	1–0	—	0–2	0–0	0–1	1–3	0–0	1–1	2–1
LASK	2–1	1–0	2–0	—	0–2	1–0	2–1	0–2	3–1	1–3
Rapid Wien	4–1	1–1	4–1	2–0	—	1–4	2–1	1–1	2–2	5–1
Red Bull Salzburg	2–1	5–0	3–1	0–0	1–0	—	4–0	4–1	1–0	2–0
St. Pölten	1–2	2–0	1–2	1–3	0–5	0–2	—	1–5	0–3	0–1
Sturm Graz	2–0	0–2	1–0	3–1	4–2	2–4	3–2	—	3–0	0–1
Mattersburg	3–2	2–1	0–1	2–1	2–4	2–2	1–1	1–0	—	5–1
Wolfsberger AC	1–3	2–1	0–0	0–3	0–0	0–0	0–1	2–1	0–2	—

Source: weltfussball.de (in German)
Legend: Blue = home team win; Yellow = draw; Red = away team win.
For upcoming matches, an "a" indicates there is an article about the rivalry between the two participants.

== Relegation play-offs ==
31 May 2018	SC Wiener Neustadt	0–2	St. Pölten	Stadion Wiener Neustadt
18:30 CEST			Pak 33'; Bajrami 70'	Attendance: 3,200; Referee: Oliver Drachta

3 June 2018	St. Pölten	1–1 (3–1 agg.)	SC Wiener Neustadt	NV Arena
15:30 CEST	Atanga 44'		Salihi 75'	Attendance: 4,844; Referee: Harald Lechner

== Statistics ==
=== Top scorers ===
Rank	Player	Club	Goals
1	(Israel) Mu'nas Dabbur	Red Bull Salzburg	22
2	(Austria) Deni Alar	Sturm Graz	20
3	(Bosnia and Herzegovina) Smail Prevljak	Mattersburg	16
4	(Austria) Christoph Knasmüllner	Admira Wacker	12
4	(Austria) Stefan Schwab	Rapid Wien	12
6	(Norway) Fredrik Gulbrandsen	Red Bull Salzburg	11
7	(Georgia (country)) Giorgi Kvilitaia	Rapid Wien	10
7	(Austria) Thomas Murg	Rapid Wien	10
7	(Austria) Raphael Holzhauser	Austria Wien	10
7	(Austria) Lukas Grozurek	Admira Wacker	10

== Awards ==
Award	Winner	Club
Player of the Year	(Kosovo) Valon Berisha	Red Bull Salzburg
Top goalscorer	(Israel) Munas Dabbur	Red Bull Salzburg
Manager of the Year	(Germany) Marco Rose	Red Bull Salzburg
Breakthrough of the Year	(Bosnia and Herzegovina) Smail Prevljak	Mattersburg

Team of the Year
Goalkeeper	(Austria) Jörg Siebenhandl (Sturm Graz)			
Defence	(Austria) Stefan Lainer (Red Bull Salzburg)	(Austria) Dario Maresic (Sturm Graz)	(Croatia) Duje Caleta-Car (Red Bull Salzburg)	(Austria) Andreas Ulmer (Red Bull Salzburg)
Midfield	(Mali) Amadou Haidara (Red Bull Salzburg)	(Mali) Diadie Samassékou (Red Bull Salzburg)	(Austria) Peter Žulj (Sturm Graz)	(Kosovo) Valon Berisha (Red Bull Salzburg)
Attack	(Israel) Munas Dabbur (Red Bull Salzburg)		(Austria) Deni Alar (Sturm Graz)	

== Attendances ==
Pos	Team	Total	High	Low	Average	Change
1	SK Rapid Wien	338,236	25,177	13,823	18,790	−10.7%
2	Sturm Graz	184,614	15,549	6,527	10,256	−2.6%
3	Red Bull Salzburg	137,096	12,049	3,722	7,616	−2.8%
4	Austria Wien	122,313	14,034	4,808	6,795	−14.2%
5	LASK Linz	88,542	5,760	3,645	4,919	+73.1%^{1}
6	Rheindorf Altach	77,174	5,631	2,717	4,287	−19.6%
7	Mattersburg	60,346	7,876	1,716	3,352	−7.1%
8	Wolfsberger AC	51,601	4,176	1,655	2,866	−22.7%
9	St. Pölten	48,192	6,008	1,368	2,677	−28.3%
10	Admira Wacker Mödling	41,423	4,516	1,241	2,301	−13.4%
	League total	1,149,537	25,177	1,241	6,386	−9.4%

Source: bundesliga.at: Zuschauerstatistik gesamt, bundesliga.at - Zuschauerstatistik pro Saison
Notes:
1: Team played last season in First League
