= Gerald Fuchsbichler =

Austrian footballer (1944-1995)

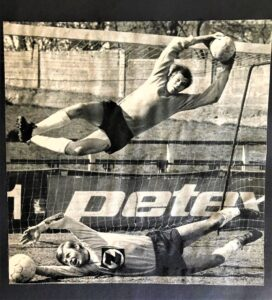
- Fuchsbichler (above) and his brother Erwin (below) in the dress of SC RAPID Vienna in the 1970/71 season

Personal information
- Date of birth: 20 April 1943
- Date of death: 23 February 1995 (aged 50)
- Place of death: Vienna
- Position: Goalkeeper

Senior career*
Years	Team	Apps	(Gls)
1964–1967	Kapfenberger SV		
1967–1971	Rapid Wien	95	(0)
1971–1976	Wiener Sport-Club		
1976–1977	SC Untersiebenbrunn		

International career
1967–1972	Austria	6	(0)
- * Club domestic league appearances and goals

Gerald Fuchsbichler (20 April 1943 – 23 February 1995) was an Austrian former international footballer. He was the older brother of Erwin Fuchsbichler, who was also a goalkeeper for the Austria national football team.

After starting his career at Kapfenberger SV, when the club was relegated from the Bundesliga at the end of the 1966/67 season, Fuchsbichler signed for Rapid Wien for 150,000 schillings (€10,900). During his time at Rapid Wien the team won the League championship, and Fuchsbichler was called up to the Austria national football team. During the 1970–71 season, Gerald's brother Erwin Fuchsbichler, also a goalkeeper, signed for Rapid Wien. In 1971 Gerard was transferred to Wiener Sport-Club for 700,000 Schillings (€50,871.00).

After retiring, he took up an office job at Nordmende. He died in 1995 of cancer of the jaw and tongue.
