= Walter Ludescher =

Austrian footballer and coach

Personal information
- Date of birth: 5 October 1942 (age 84)
- Position: Defender

Youth career
- 1955–1961: KAC

Senior career*
Years	Team	Apps	(Gls)
1962–1964	SK Rapid Wien	4	(0)
1964–1968	FC Wacker Innsbruck		

International career
1964–1966	Austria	7	(0)

Managerial career
- SV St. Veit/Glan
- Austria Klagenfurt
- 1986–1988: SK Sturm Graz
- SV Spittal
- * Club domestic league appearances and goals

Walter Ludescher (5 October 1942) is an Austrian retired footballer and coach.
