= Alfred Schrottenbaum =

Austrian footballer (1938–2004)

Personal information
- Date of birth: 12 April 1938
- Date of death: 25 December 2004 (aged 66)
- Position: Defender

Senior career*
Years	Team	Apps	(Gls)
–1961	Wacker Wien	61	(1)
1961–1963	Rapid Wien	20	(0)
1963–1964	FC Dornbirn	13	(0)
1964–1966	Sturm Graz	23	(1)
1966–1969	Schwarz-Weiß Bregenz	22	(0)
1969–1970	FC Dornbirn (player-manager)	30	(0)

International career
1963	Austria	1	(0)
- * Club domestic league appearances and goals

Alfred Schrottenbaum (12 April 1938 – 25 December 2004) was an Austrian footballer who played as a defender. He played in one match for the Austria national team in 1963.
