= Franz Hasil =

Austrian footballer

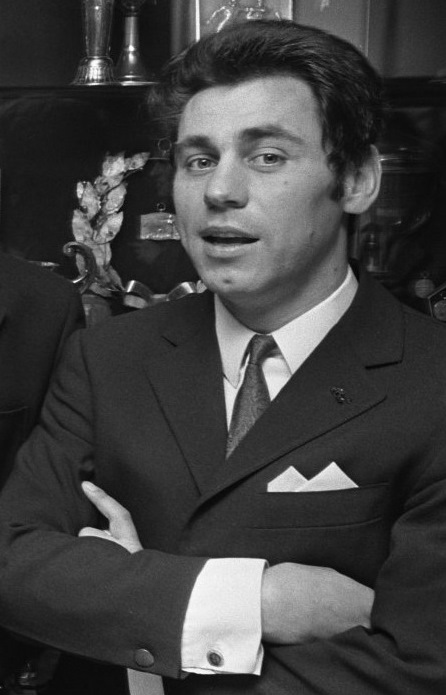
- Hasil in 1970

Personal information
- Full name: Franz Hasil
- Date of birth: 28 July 1944 (age 82)
- Place of birth: Vienna, Nazi Germany
- Height: 1.75 m (5 ft 9 in)
- Position: Midfielder

Youth career
- SK Rapid Wien

Senior career*
Years	Team	Apps	(Gls)
1962–1968	SK Rapid Wien	103	(18)
1968–1969	FC Schalke 04	23	(5)
1969–1973	Feyenoord	112	(33)
1973–1977	Austria Klagenfurt	98	(13)
1977–1978	Vienna FC 1894		

International career
1963–1974	Austria	21	(2)

Managerial career
- 1982: First Vienna
- 1983: ESV Parndorf
- 1987–1988: Wiener Sport-Club
- * Club domestic league appearances and goals

Franz Hasil (born 28 July 1944 in Vienna) is a former Austrian footballer.

== Club career ==
Born in Vienna, Hasil started his career at local giants Rapid Wien, winning three league titles and one cup. After one season in West Germany with Schalke 04, he moved to Feyenoord where he played under fellow Austrian Ernst Happel, winning the European Cup and the Intercontinental Cup in 1970, and the Eredivisie in 1971. He was sold to Austria Klagenfurt for €23,000 in 1973.

== International career ==
He earned 21 caps for the Austria national football team, scoring two goals.

== Honours ==
Rapid Wien

- Austrian Football Bundesliga: 1963–64, 1966–67, 1967–68
- Austrian Cup: 1967–68

Feyenoord Rotterdam

- European Cup: 1969–70
- Intercontinental Cup: 1970
- Eredivisie: 1970–71
