= Walter Skocik =

Austrian footballer and manager

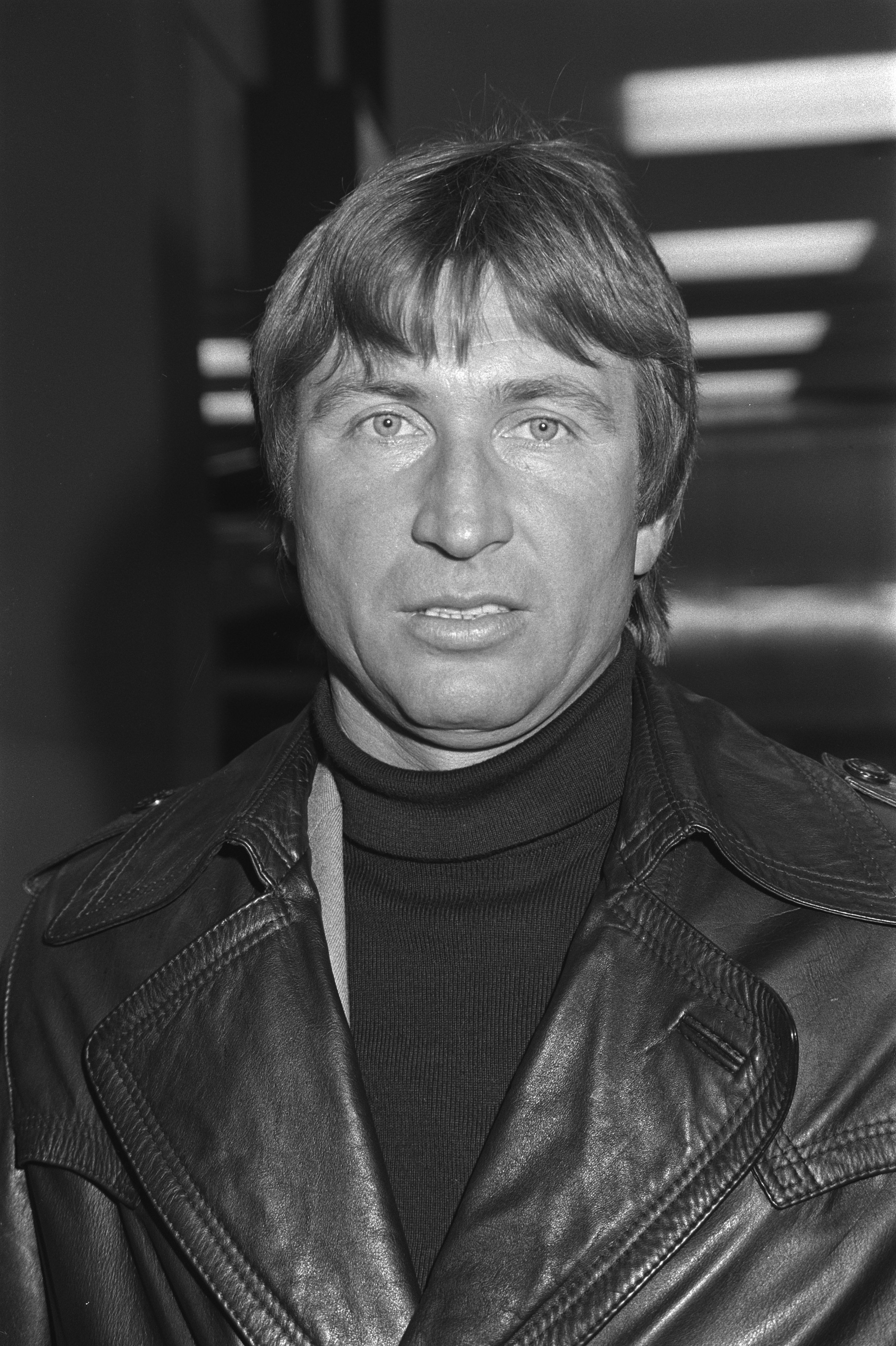
- Skocik in 1981

Personal information
- Date of birth: 6 September 1940 (age 86)
- Place of birth: Schwechat, Nazi Germany
- Position: Midfielder

Senior career*
Years	Team	Apps	(Gls)
1959–1969	Rapid Wien	199	(33)
1969–1971	SV Wattens	60	(5)
1971–1973	Wacker Innsbruck	55	(3)
1973–1974	Fribourg		
1974–1979	Casino Bregenz		
Total		314	(41)

International career
1960–1967	Austria	14	(0)

Managerial career
- 1973–1974: Fribourg
- 1974–1979: Casino Bregenz
- 1979–1982: Rapid Wien
- 1982–1983: Las Palmas
- 1983–1984: AEL
- 1984–1986: PAOK
- 1986: Wiener Sport-Club
- 1986–1989: Al-Ittihad (Jeddah)
- 1990: Olympiacos Volos
- 1990–1991: Apollon Athens
- 1991: Ethnikos Piraeus
- 1993: Wacker Innsbruck
- 1993–1995: LASK Linz
- 1995–1996: Omonia Nicosia
- 1996–1997: Austria Wien
- 1997: Diagoras Rhodes
- 1997–1998: VSE St. Pölten
- 1998–2000: First Vienna
- 2002–2003: Mannswörth
- 2005–2006: Diagoras Rhodes
- * Club domestic league appearances and goals

Walter Skocik (born 6 September 1940 in Schwechat) is an Austrian former international footballer and football manager.

== Career ==
=== Playing career ===
==== Club career ====
Skocik played as a midfielder and had a ten-year spell at Austrian giants Rapid Wien from 1959 to 1969, winning 4 Austrian Football Bundesliga Championships and 3 Austrian Cups. He then played two seasons for SV Wattens and in the summer of 1971, the club merged with Wacker Innsbruck, also playing in Austrian first division, to form a single team called SpG Swarovski Wattens-Innsbruck (SSW Innsbruck) in order to focus the football power of Tyrol better. Over the next two years, Skocik added 2 Championships and 1 Cup in his honours as a footballer. Skocik also played for Fribourg in Switzerland and finished his career at Casino Bregenz in 1979.

==== International career ====
Skocik had 14 caps for the Austria national team between 1960 and 1967.

National team	Year	Caps
Austria
Austria	1960	3
Austria	1963	1
Austria	1964	5
Austria	1966	4
Austria	1967	1
Total		14

=== Managerial career ===
After his retirement as a football player, Skocik pursued a managerial career. In 1981–82 season, he was the manager of his beloved Rapid Wien for 26 league matches, however he was replaced for the remaining 10 matches by Rudolf Nuske who led the Green-Whites to the league title. The next year, he coached Las Palmas for 27 matches in the 1982–83 La Liga.

His most notable feat came when he arrived in Greece. In 1983–84 season, he led AEL to a 6th place finish in the Greek Championship and also reached the Greek Cup final, losing 2–0 to Panathinaikos. His successful spell at AEL, drove the attention of PAOK president Giorgos Pantelakis who appointed Skocik to guide the first-team for the 1984–85 season. Although Pantelakis stepped down from the club's presidency, Skocik remained as manager and led PAOK to win their second league title in history.

Throughout his managerial career Skocik coached various teams like Wacker Innsbruck, LASK Linz, Austria Wien, Al-Ittihad (Jeddah), Omonia Nicosia, Apollon Athens, Olympiacos Volos, Ethnikos Piraeus and Diagoras.

== Honours ==
=== As a player ===
Rapid Wien

- Austrian Championship: 1959–60, 1963–64, 1966–67, 1967–68
- Austrian Cup: 1960–61, 1967–68, 1968–69

Wacker Innsbruck

- Austrian Championship: 1971–72, 1972–73
- Austrian Cup: 1972–73

=== As a manager ===
PAOK

- Greek Championship: 1984–85
