= Hans-Georg Tutschek =

Austrian footballer

Personal information
- Date of birth: 18 September 1941
- Position: Forward

Senior career*
Years	Team	Apps	(Gls)
1961–1964	Rapid Wien	6	(0)
1963–1964	1. Wr. Neustädter SC	10	(3)
1964–1965	Eintracht Frankfurt	7	(3)
1965–1966	FC Wacker Innsbruck	23	(3)
1966–1967	FC Bayern Hof		
1967–1969	KSV Hessen Kassel		
1969–1971	Wacker Wien		
1971–1972	Vienna		
- * Club domestic league appearances and goals

Hans-Georg Tutschek (born 18 September 1941) is an Austrian former footballer.
