= Walter Gebhardt =

Austrian footballer

Personal information
- Date of birth: 10 November 1945
- Place of birth: Vienna, Austria
- Position: Defender

Senior career*
Years	Team	Apps	(Gls)
1965–1971	SK Rapid Wien	135	(1)
1971–1978	Linzer ASK	171	(1)
1978–1980	USK Anif		
1980–1981	Wuppertaler SV		
1981–1982	SKU Amstetten		

International career
1966–1969	Austria	17	(0)

Managerial career
- 1978–1980: USK Anif
- 1981–1982: SKU Amstetten
- * Club domestic league appearances and goals

Walter Gebhardt (born 10 November 1945) is a retired Austrian football defender who played for Austria. He also played for SK Rapid Wien, Linzer ASK, USK Anif, Wuppertaler SV and SKU Amstetten.
