= Erich Fak =

Austrian former international footballer

Personal information
- Full name: Erich Stub Fak
- Date of birth: 10 March 1945 (age 81)
- Height: 1.83 m (6 ft 0 in)
- Position: Defender

Senior career*
Years	Team	Apps	(Gls)
1964–1973	Rapid Wien	177	(2)
1973–1975	Austria Klagenfurt	47	(0)
1975–1977	FC Tulln		
1978	DSV Alpine Donawitz		
1978–1984	SK Slovan HAC		

International career
1967–1971	Austria	13	(0)
- * Club domestic league appearances and goals

Erich Fak (born 10 March 1945) is an Austrian former international footballer.
