= 1966–67 Austrian football championship =

49th season of top-tier football league in Austria

Austrian Nationalliga
- Season: 1966–67
- Champions: SK Rapid Wien

Statistics of Austrian Nationalliga in the 1966–67 season.

== Overview ==
It was contested by 14 teams, and SK Rapid Wien won the championship.

== League standings ==
Pos	Team	Pld	W	D	L	GF	GA	GD	Pts
1	SK Rapid Wien	26	20	1	5	72	29	+43	41
2	FC Wacker Innsbruck	26	18	5	3	58	24	+34	41
3	FK Austria Wien	26	14	7	5	43	23	+20	35
4	Linzer ASK	26	12	7	7	39	25	+14	31
5	Wiener Sportclub	26	12	6	8	60	36	+24	30
6	Schwarz-Weiß Bregenz	26	12	3	11	26	34	−8	27
7	SK Admira Wien Energie	26	10	6	10	36	25	+11	26
8	First Vienna FC	26	11	4	11	42	49	−7	26
9	Grazer AK	26	8	7	11	27	44	−17	23
10	Austria Klagenfurt	26	8	6	12	21	33	−12	22
11	SK Sturm Graz	26	7	4	15	32	47	−15	18
12	SC Wacker	26	7	4	15	28	50	−22	18
13	1. Wiener Neustädter SC	26	6	3	17	21	44	−23	15
14	Kapfenberger SV	26	2	7	17	17	59	−42	11

Source: rsssf.com

== Results ==
Home \ Away	ADM	KLA	AWI	BRE	FIR	GAK	KAP	LIN	RAP	STU	WIN	WAK	WNE	WIE
Admira Wien Energie		1–0	1–2	7–1	1–1	0–1	3–0	0–0	1–3	1–2	3–1	1–0	4–1	0–0
Austria Klagenfurt	2–0		0–1	0–1	0–2	3–2	2–2	0–1	0–6	2–2	0–5	0–0	1–0	0–0
Austria Wien	2–1	0–1		0–0	2–2	4–0	4–0	1–1	0–4	2–0	1–3	6–1	2–0	2–2
Bregenz	0–1	0–0	0–2		2–3	2–1	0–1	2–0	0–2	0–2	1–5	2–0	2–1	3–2
First Vienna	1–0	3–2	1–2	1–0		0–0	3–2	1–4	0–1	4–3	3–1	4–3	1–0	1–4
Grazer AK	0–0	2–0	1–1	1–0	2–0		1–1	0–0	2–4	0–2	2–3	2–1	2–2	0–4
Kapfenberger SV	0–0	0–0	0–1	1–1	2–3	1–2		0–3	0–3	0–3	0–2	1–6	0–1	1–8
Linzer ASK	1–1	0–1	1–1	1–2	2–1	2–1	1–0		0–3	3–0	0–1	0–0	2–0	3–1
Rapid Wien	4–2	1–0	1–0	0–1	6–1	8–1	5–0	0–4		2–0	1–1	2–1	4–1	0–4
Sturm Graz	1–4	0–1	0–2	0–1	2–1	0–1	2–1	1–3	2–4		1–1	0–4	1–2	0–3
Wacker Innsbruck	1–0	2–1	1–0	0–1	2–2	2–0	2–2	4–2	3–0	2–1		1–1	5–0	2–1
Wacker Wien	1–0	0–3	0–2	3–0	1–0	1–1	0–1	0–2	0–5	0–4	0–2		2–1	1–6
Wiener Neustädter SC	0–2	1–0	2–3	0–1	2–1	1–2	2–0	1–1	0–1	1–1	0–2	0–1		1–3
Wiener SC	0–2	1–2	0–0	0–3	3–2	2–0	1–1	3–2	5–2	2–2	1–4	4–1	0–1	

Legend: Blue = home team win; Yellow = draw; Red = away team win.
