= 1963–64 Austrian football championship =

46th season of top-tier football league in Austria

Austrian Staatsliga
- Season: 1963–64
- Champions: SK Rapid Wien

Statistics of Austrian Staatsliga in the 1963–64 season.

== Overview ==
It was contested by 14 teams, and SK Rapid Wien won the championship.

== League standings ==
Pos	Team	Pld	W	D	L	GF	GA	GD	Pts
1	SK Rapid Wien	26	19	5	2	69	27	+42	43
2	FK Austria Wien	26	17	3	6	61	36	+25	37
3	Linzer ASK	26	15	3	8	46	36	+10	33
4	1. Schwechater SC	26	13	5	8	51	41	+10	31
5	Wiener Sportclub	26	13	5	8	48	53	−5	31
6	Grazer AK	26	11	5	10	49	42	+7	27
7	SK Admira Wien Energie	26	11	5	10	52	49	+3	27
8	First Vienna FC	26	8	8	10	38	33	+5	24
9	Wiener AC	26	7	10	9	33	38	−5	24
10	1. Wiener Neustädter SC	26	8	6	12	33	47	−14	22
11	Kapfenberger SV	26	8	2	16	38	56	−18	18
12	SVS Linz	26	5	7	14	42	56	−14	17
13	1. Simmeringer SC	26	8	1	17	46	64	−18	17
14	FC Dornbirn	26	4	5	17	31	59	−28	13

Source: rsssf.com

== Results ==
Home \ Away	ADM	AWI	DOR	FIR	GAK	KAP	LIN	RWI	SCH	SIM	SLI	WAC	WNE	WIE
Admira Wien Energie		1–2	4–2	0–5	2–1	2–1	1–2	2–4	2–3	2–1	1–0	0–0	0–0	7–1
Austria Wien	2–0		3–1	2–1	0–2	2–0	4–1	2–2	3–2	2–3	3–2	0–1	0–1	2–1
Dornbirn	3–5	1–1		0–1	1–3	0–3	1–1	2–6	3–1	2–3	1–1	1–2	6–2	1–2
First Vienna	3–3	0–2	4–0		1–2	0–2	0–1	1–1	0–0	2–0	0–0	0–0	3–1	4–1
Grazer AK	3–3	2–1	1–2	2–2		2–0	0–1	1–4	1–1	5–1	3–0	1–1	0–1	2–3
Kapfenberger SV	2–2	2–5	0–2	2–0	0–0		0–3	3–4	2–3	4–2	1–3	0–2	2–1	1–2
Linzer ASK	4–2	3–2	2–0	2–1	1–0	1–3		2–3	1–0	5–1	0–1	1–1	2–0	1–2
Rapid Wien	1–0	2–3	4–0	2–1	3–1	5–0	2–1		1–1	1–1	4–0	2–0	3–1	3–1
1. Schwechater SC	2–3	2–2	3–1	2–1	2–1	3–0	4–1	0–1		3–1	3–2	1–0	3–1	1–2
Simmeringer SC	0–3	0–2	2–0	2–3	4–5	4–2	2–3	1–5	3–0		3–0	0–2	1–2	3–4
SVS Linz	1–2	3–6	0–0	0–3	7–1	2–3	2–3	3–1	2–4	1–0		5–6	0–0	3–3
Wiener AC	0–2	1–2	1–0	2–2	0–3	3–2	2–2	0–0	1–2	2–3	2–2		3–4	0–0
Wiener Neustädter SC	3–1	0–3	3–0	0–0	1–3	1–2	2–1	0–3	2–2	1–3	2–1	1–1		2–2
Wiener SC	3–2	2–5	1–1	4–0	0–4	2–1	0–1	0–2	4–3	3–2	1–1	2–0	2–1	

Legend: Blue = home team win; Yellow = draw; Red = away team win.
