= Rudolf Nuske =

Austrian footballer and coach

Personal information
- Date of birth: 8 October 1942
- Position: Midfielder

Senior career*
Years	Team	Apps	(Gls)
1959–1965	SK Rapid Wien	19	(4)
- 1. Simmeringer SC
1970–1973	WSG Radenthein		
1973–1974	SpG Radenthein/VSV		
1974–1975	SC Eisenstadt		

Managerial career
- 1982: SK Rapid Wien
- * Club domestic league appearances and goals

Rudolf Nuske (born 8 October 1942) is an Austrian former footballer and coach.
