= Toni Fritsch =

Austrian American football player and footballer (1945–2005)

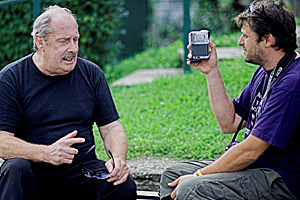
- Toni Fritsch (left)
- Born: 10 July 1945; Petronell-Carnuntum, Austria
- Died: 13 September 2005 (aged 60); Vienna, Austria
- Height: 1.70 m (5 ft 7 in)
Association football career
- Position: Striker
Youth career
- Rapid Wien
Senior career*
Years	Team	Apps	(Gls)
1963–1971	Rapid Wien	123	(15)
International career^{‡}
1965–1968	Austria	9	(2)
- * Club domestic league appearances and goals as of 28 June 2008 ‡ National team caps and goals as of 28 June 2008
- Football career

No. 15, 16
- Position: Kicker

Personal information
- Listed weight: 190 lb (86 kg)

Career information
- NFL draft: 1971: undrafted

Career history
- Dallas Cowboys (1971–1975); San Diego Chargers (1976); Houston Oilers (1977–1981); New Orleans Saints (1982); Houston Gamblers (1984–1985)

Awards and highlights
- Super Bowl champion (VI); First-team All-Pro (1979); Pro Bowl (1979); USFL All-League Team (1984)

Career NFL statistics
- Games played: 125
- Field goals made: 137
- Field goal attempts: 231
- Extra points made: 287
- Extra point attempts: 300
- Stats at Pro Football Reference

Anton K. "Toni" Fritsch (10 July 1945 – 14 September 2005) was an Austrian footballer who later started a successful career in American football in the United States. He is distinguished as being the first Austrian to play in the National Football League (NFL). He is the only player in history to win professional titles in both association football and American football: he won the Austrian League in 1964, 1967, and 1968, and the Super Bowl in 1972.

== Association football career ==
Fritsch started to play association football at an early age and joined the Austrian record titleholder Rapid Vienna at the age of 13. After six seasons, he was admitted to the club's first league team and played his first professional game in fall 1964. During his time there, he played 123 games for Rapid, scoring 15 goals. The team won the Austrian Championship three times (1964, 1967, 1968) and the Austrian Cup twice (1968, 1969). He was described as a small but extremely fast striker.

He played for the Austria national football team nine times. He scored two goals when Austria defeated England 3–2 in London's Wembley Stadium on 20 October 1965, from which his nickname "Wembley-Toni" is derived. This was only the third time for a continental team to beat England at home (following Hungary in 1953 and Sweden in 1959).

== American football career ==
=== Dallas Cowboys ===
Fritsch was an association football (soccer) player who had never played a down of American football that the Dallas Cowboys converted into a placekicker. He was discovered by the team's scouts during a 1971 European tour in which they were looking for soccer-style kickers, which at the time was becoming popular in the National Football League. The first city they went to was Vienna, and the first player they tried was Fritsch. Though hardly speaking any English at all, he decided to sign a contract as an undrafted free agent, move to the United States, and join the team's training camp.

He was activated on 1 November after starting the season on the taxi squad, making his NFL debut against the St. Louis Cardinals, where he kicked a game-winning field goal in a 16–13 victory. That year, he suffered from a pulled hamstring muscle; the majority of the kicking duties went to Mike Clark. Fritsch did get a Super Bowl ring that season though, as he was on the roster of the Super Bowl VI-winning team.

In 1972 he made a club record of 21 field goals, the first Austrian to do so. He also was the first known American football player to use a football-style crossed kick (now known as a rabona) late in the fourth quarter of the 1972 NFC Divisional playoffs, during an onside kick that contributed to a historic come-from-behind 30–28 victory against the San Francisco 49ers.

In 1974, he was lost for the season after injuring his knee and was replaced with Efren Herrera. The next year Herrera was placed on the injured reserve list, and Fritsch came back to lead the NFL in points (104) and field goals (22, tied with Jan Stenerud). On 6 September, 1976, because of inconsistencies, he was traded to the San Diego Chargers in exchange for an eighth-round draft choice (#208-Al Cleveland).

=== San Diego Chargers ===
With the San Diego Chargers, he played in 5 games before being waived because he was inconsistent.

=== Houston Oilers ===
On 18 September 1977, he was signed as a free agent by the Houston Oilers and led the American Football Conference with a 75% field goal average. He was a part of the franchise's "Luv Ya Blue" period. In 1979, he received All-Pro and Pro Bowl honours. The next year, he led the league with a 79.2% field goal average. He was cut on 3 September 1982, after being beaten by Florian Kempf.

=== New Orleans Saints ===
Fritsch was signed as a free agent by the New Orleans Saints in 1982 to replace an injured rookie, Morten Andersen, and reunite with his former head coach, Bum Phillips. On 21 December, 1982, he announced his retirement. He finished with 758 points in 125 games during his 11-year NFL career, 317 of those for Dallas. He led the NFL in field goal percentage three times (1977, 1979, 1980). His NFL record of having kicked a field goal in 13 straight playoff games was tied by Adam Vinatieri on 13 January, 2007.

=== Houston Gamblers (USFL) ===
In 1984, he came out of retirement to sign with the Houston Gamblers of the United States Football League and at the end of the season received all-league honours. He converted 42 of 50 field goals and 126 of 131 extra points for a total of 252 points in two seasons.

== Personal life ==
After his retirement he worked in Europe as a sports commentator and in finance, providing support to Austrian businessmen who wanted to settle in the United States. Even though Fritsch worked for his former Austrian football (soccer) club, Rapid Vienna, for one year in 1992–1993, he remained a resident of Houston throughout the rest of his life.

On 13 September 2005, Fritsch collapsed on a Vienna street after a meal at a restaurant. He died of heart failure at the age of 60.

== Honours ==
- Austrian Football Bundesliga (3):
  - 1964, 1967, 1968
- Austrian Cup (2):
  - 1968, 1969
- Super Bowl (1):
  - 1972
