= Ewald Ullmann =

Austrian footballer (born 1943)

Personal information
- Date of birth: 5 May 1943 (age 83)
- Position: Midfielder

Senior career*
Years	Team	Apps	(Gls)
1963–1973	SK Rapid Wien	178	(10)
1972–1975	Austria Klagenfurt		

International career
1965–1967	Austria	6	(0)
- * Club domestic league appearances and goals

Ewald Ullmann (born 5 May 1943) is an Austrian retired footballer.
