= Leopold Grausam =

Austrian footballer (1943–2023)

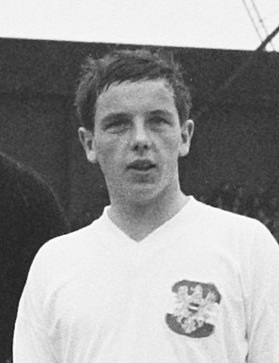
- Grausam in 1964

Personal information
- Date of birth: 29 June 1943
- Place of birth: Pressbaum, Austria
- Date of death: 8 September 2023 (aged 80)
- Position: Forward

Youth career
- 1953–1956: Hellas Kagran
- 1956–1958: SV Pressbaum
- 1958–1963: Rapid Wien

Senior career*
Years	Team	Apps	(Gls)
1963–1970	Rapid Wien	142	(58)
1970–1971	Wacker Innsbruck	1	(1)
1971–1972	LASK	4	(0)
1972–1973	FC Grenchen		

International career
1964–1967	Austria	8	(3)

Managerial career
- 1978–1980: SV Leobendorf
- 1983–1984: SV Gablitz
- 1984–1985: Floridsdorfer AC
- 1991–1992: ASK-BSC Bruck/Leitha
- 1999–2000: Gaswerk/Straßenbahn
- * Club domestic league appearances and goals

Leopold Grausam (29 June 1943 – 8 September 2023) was an Austrian footballer who played as a forward. Grausam died on 8 September 2023, at the age of 80.
