= 1967–68 Austrian football championship =

50th season of top-tier football league in Austria

Austrian Nationalliga
- Season: 1967–68
- Champions: SK Rapid Wien

Statistics of Austrian Nationalliga in the 1967–68 season.

== Overview ==
It was contested by 14 teams, and SK Rapid Wien won the championship.

== League standings ==
Pos	Team	Pld	W	D	L	GF	GA	GD	Pts
1	SK Rapid Wien	26	21	2	3	75	24	+51	44
2	FC Wacker Innsbruck	26	15	7	4	45	27	+18	37
3	FK Austria Wien	26	15	5	6	46	24	+22	35
4	Wiener Sportclub	26	11	9	6	41	30	+11	31
5	Austria Klagenfurt	26	11	7	8	31	36	−5	29
6	Grazer AK	26	11	5	10	35	37	−2	27
7	SK Sturm Graz	26	9	7	10	38	47	−9	25
8	Linzer ASK	26	8	7	11	40	37	+3	23
9	SK Admira Wien Energie	26	5	11	10	41	47	−6	21
10	SC Eisenstadt	26	8	5	13	26	33	−7	21
11	Schwarz-Weiß Bregenz	26	8	5	13	27	41	−14	21
12	SV Austria Salzburg	26	7	6	13	34	43	−9	20
13	First Vienna FC	26	7	1	18	27	50	−23	15
14	WSG Radenthein	26	5	5	16	30	60	−30	15

Source: rsssf.com

== Results ==
Home \ Away	ADM	KLA	ASZ	AWI	BRE	EIS	FIR	GAK	LIN	RAD	RWI	STU	WKR	WIE
Admira Wien Energie		1–3	2–4	1–2	0–3	1–1	2–3	0–1	2–2	2–2	1–1	2–2	0–0	1–1
Austria Klagenfurt	2–1		0–0	0–9	1–1	1–0	0–1	2–0	1–1	1–0	0–1	3–0	0–0	0–0
Austria Salzburg	1–1	1–2		0–1	1–2	3–0	1–2	3–1	0–0	4–0	1–2	2–2	1–3	0–1
Austria Wien	1–1	2–1	3–0		5–0	2–0	1–0	2–1	2–0	3–0	2–1	2–2	1–2	0–3
Bregenz	3–3	0–1	1–3	0–1		2–2	1–0	0–1	0–2	2–0	0–6	0–0	1–2	1–1
Eisenstadt	4–0	2–0	0–1	0–1	1–0		2–0	1–1	1–0	1–2	0–1	1–0	1–2	1–2
First Vienna	1–2	0–2	1–4	3–1	0–4	1–4		3–1	1–3	1–2	0–1	0–0	0–2	4–2
Grazer AK	0–3	1–2	3–0	0–0	1–0	1–1	1–0		1–0	4–3	1–3	3–1	2–2	2–2
Linzer ASK	2–3	2–3	2–1	2–2	5–0	4–0	0–3	0–2		0–0	1–5	0–3	1–1	0–0
Radenthein	0–3	1–1	0–0	1–3	0–1	0–0	2–0	1–2	1–6		2–3	1–6	1–4	4–2
Rapid Wien	3–0	5–1	7–0	3–0	1–3	3–1	3–0	3–1	1–0	5–0		5–2	3–1	0–1
Sturm Graz	0–7	3–1	3–1	2–0	1–2	2–0	2–1	2–1	0–4	1–5	2–4		1–0	0–1
Wacker Innsbruck	4–1	4–3	3–1	0–0	1–1	0–1	2–0	2–1	3–1	1–0	3–3	0–0		0–2
Wiener SC	1–1	0–0	1–1	1–0	2–0	3–1	5–2	1–2	1–2	4–2	1–2	1–1	2–3	

Legend: Blue = home team win; Yellow = draw; Red = away team win.
