= Walter Glechner =

Austrian footballer

Personal information
- Date of birth: 12 February 1939
- Place of birth: Vienna, Nazi Germany
- Date of death: 29 January 2015 (aged 75)
- Place of death: Vienna, Austria
- Position: Defender

Youth career
- 1949–1959: Rapid Wien

Senior career*
Years	Team	Apps	(Gls)
1958–1971	Rapid Wien	257	(9)
1971–1974	SV Admira Wiener Neustadt		
1974–?	Hütte Krems		

International career
1960–1968	Austria	35	(1)
- * Club domestic league appearances and goals

Walter Glechner (12 February 1939 – 29 January 2015) was an Austrian footballer.

== Club career ==
Glechner spent the majority of his career at Austria giants Rapid Wien, playing over 250 league matches in a 13-year spell.

== International career ==
Glechner made his debut for Austria in a May 1960 friendly match against Scotland and earned a total of 35 caps, scored 1 goal. He represented his country in 2 FIFA World Cup qualification matches.

His final international was a June 1968 match against the Soviet Union.

=== International goals ===
Scores and results list Austria's goal tally first.

N.	Date	Venue	Opponent	Score	Result	Competition
1.	11 October 1964	Praterstadion, Vienna, Austria	Soviet Union	1-0	1–0	Friendly match
