= Walter Seitl =

Austrian footballer (1941–1982)

Personal information
- Date of birth: 15 March 1941
- Date of death: 5 September 1982 (aged 41)
- Position: Striker

Senior career*
Years	Team	Apps	(Gls)
–1960	FavAC		
1960–1968	SK Rapid Wien	137	(67)
1968–1969	Austria Salzburg		
1969–1970	SC Eisenstadt		
1969–1970	Austria Salzburg		
1970–1971	Wacker Wien		
1971–1972	SC Eisenstadt		
- Slovan/HAC

International career
1965–1966	Austria	6	(2)
- * Club domestic league appearances and goals

Walter Seitl (15 March 1941 – 5 September 1982) was an Austrian footballer.
