= Rudi Flögel =

Austrian footballer

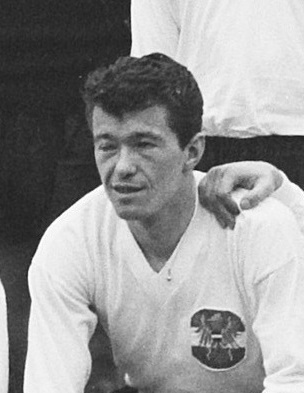

Personal information
- Full name: Rudolf Flögel
- Date of birth: 13 December 1939 (age 86)
- Place of birth: Vienna, Nazi Germany
- Position: Striker

Senior career*
Years	Team	Apps	(Gls)
1958–1972	Rapid Vienna	333	(145)
1972–1973	1. Wiener Neustädter SC	30	(7)
1973–1976	1. Simmeringer SC	32	(7)
Total		393	(159)

International career
1960–1969	Austria	40	(5)

Managerial career
- 1976–1979: 1. Simmeringer SC
- 1979–1981: SC Neusiedl/See 1919
- VfB Mödling
- Prater SV
- 1984–1985: Wiener Sport-Club
- 1988–1990: SV Stockerau
- 1990–1998: Prater SV
- 1998–2001: 1. Simmeringer SC
- 2001–2002: DSV Fortuna 05 Wien
- 2003–2005: Favoritner AC
- 2005–2006: SV Wienerfeld
- 2006–2007: IC Favoriten
- 2007–2008: 1. Simmeringer SC
- * Club domestic league appearances and goals

Rudolf Flögel (born 13 December 1939) is an Austrian former professional footballer who played as a striker for Rapid Vienna.

He is the father of Thomas Flögel.

== Club career ==
Born in Vienna, Rudi Flögel played almost his entire career at Rapid Wien, where he captained the team in his last two seasons before moving to Admira Wiener Neustadt and Simmering.

== International career ==
He made his debut for Austria in a May 1960 friendly match against Scotland. He earned 40 caps, scoring 6 goals.

His last international was a September 1969 friendly match against West Germany.
