= Decoding Reality =

2010 book by Serbian Vlatko Vedral

Decoding Reality: The Universe as Quantum Information
- Front Cover
- Author: Vlatko Vedral
- Language: English
- Subject: Science
- Genre: Non-fiction
- Publisher: Oxford University Press
- Publication date: 2010
- Publication place: United Kingdom
- Media type: Print (Hardback)
- Pages: x, 256 pp.
- ISBN: 0-19-923769-7
- LC Class: Q360 .V43 2010

Decoding Reality: The Universe as Quantum Information is a popular science book by Vlatko Vedral published by Oxford University Press in 2010. Vedral examines information theory and proposes information as the most fundamental building block of reality. He argues what a useful framework this is for viewing all natural and physical phenomena. In building out this framework the books touches upon the origin of information, the idea of entropy, the roots of this thinking in thermodynamics, the replication of DNA, development of social networks, quantum behaviour at the micro and macro level, and the very role of indeterminism in the universe. The book finishes by considering the answer to the ultimate question: where did all of the information in the Universe come from? The ideas address concepts related to the nature of particles, time, determinism, and of reality itself.

== Contents ==
=== "Creation Ex Nihilo: Something from Nothing" ===
Vedral believes in the principle that information is physical. Creation ex nihilo comes from Catholic dogma, the idea being that God created the universe out of nothing. Vedral says that invoking a supernatural being as an explanation for creation does not explain reality because the supernatural being would have to come into existence itself too somehow presumably from nothing (or else from an infinite regression of supernatural beings), thus of course the reality can come from nothing without a supernatural being. Occam's razor principle favours the simplest explanation. Vedral believes information is the fundamental building block of reality as it occurs at the macro level (economics, human behaviour etc.) as well as the subatomic level. Vedral argues that information is the only candidate for such a building block that can explain its own existence as information generates additional information that needs to be compressed thus generating more information. 'Annihilation of everything' is a more fitting term than creation ex nihilo Vedral states, as compression of possibilities is the process of how new information is created.

=== "Information for all Seasons" ===
Vedral uses an Italo Calvino philosophical story about a tarot-like card game as the kernel for his metaphor of conscious life arriving in medias res to a pre-existing contextual reality. In this game the individual observers/players (Vedral suggests: quantum physics, thermodynamics, biology, sociology, economics, philosophy) lay down cards with ambiguous meanings as an attempt to communicate messages to deduce meaning out of the other players' interactions. The results (information) of previous rounds establish contextual rules for observers/players in subsequent rounds. The point of this game is not established until the last card has been played as later cards can change the meaning of previous events, as in the case of the quantum explanation for the photoelectric effect instantly disproving classical physics. Vedral points out that in our reality there is no last card.

=== "Back to Basics: Bits and Pieces" ===
Shannon entropy or information content measured as the surprise value of a particular event, is essentially inversely proportional to the logarithm of the event's probability, i = log(1/p). Claude Shannon's information theory arose from research at Bell labs, building upon George Boole's digital logic. As information theory predicts common and easily predicted words tend to become shorter for optimal communication channel efficiency while less common words tend to be longer for redundancy and error correction. Vedral compares the process of life to John von Neumann's self replicating automata. These are enduring information carriers that will survive wear and tear of the individual by producing copies that can in turn go on to produce more copies.

=== "Digital Romance: Life is a Four-Letter Word" ===
Genetic code as an efficient digital information store, containing built in codon redundancy for error correction in transcription.

=== "Murphy’s Law: I Knew this Would Happen to Me" ===
Examines the second law of thermodynamics and the process of information increasing entropy. Maxwell's demon was thought to be a way around this inevitability; however, such a demon would run out of information storage space and have to delete unwanted data thus having to do work to do so, increasing entropy.

=== "Place Your Bets: In It to Win It" ===
Blackjack as controlled risk taking using Shannon's information theory probability formulas. Casino as a ′cool′ financial entropy source and the gambler as a ′hot′ financial source, once again the second law of thermodynamics means the flow is almost always from hot to cold in the long run. For managed risk spread bets widely and in high-risk high-reward investments (assuming a known probability), this is the Log optimal portfolio approach.

=== "Social Informatics: Get Connected or Die Tryin’" ===
Six degrees of separation means well connected people tend to be more successful as their social networks expose them to more chances to make choices they want. Schelling precommitment as strategy in social and self-control, for example burning your bridges by buying gym membership to help motivated self win over lazy self. Mutual information resulting in phase transitions in social and political demography as well as physical systems, like water freezing into ice at a particular critical temperature or magnetic fields spontaneously aligning in certain atoms when cooling from a molten state.

=== "Quantum Schmuntum: Lights, Camera, Action!" ===
Vedral examines the basis of quantum information, the qubit, and examines one-time pad quantum cryptography as the most secure form of encryption because of its uncomputability. Quantum entanglement demonstrates the importance of mutual information in defining outcomes in a reality.

=== "Surfing the Waves: Hyper-Fast Computers" ===
Quantum computers offer a search advantage over classical computers by searching many database elements at once as a result of quantum superpositions. A sufficiently advanced quantum computer would break current encryption methods by factorizing large numbers several orders of magnitude faster than any existing classical computer. Any computable problem may be expressed as a general quantum search algorithm although classical computers may have an advantage over quantum search when using more efficient tailored classical algorithms. The issue with quantum computers is that a measurement must be made to determine if the problem is solved which collapses the superposition. Vedral points out that unintentional interaction with the environment can be mitigated with redundancy, and this would be necessary if we were to scale up current quantum computers to achieve greater utility, i.e. to utilize 10 qubits have a 100 atom quantum system so that if one atom decoheres a consensus will still be held by the other 9 for the state of the same qubit.

=== "Children of the Aimless Chance: Randomness versus Determinism" ===
Randomness is key to generating new sources of surprise in a reality. Compression of these new sources to discard unimportant information is the deterministic element and organising principle.

=== "Sand Reckoning: Whose Information is It, Anyway?" ===
The information content of the universe as measured in bits or qubits. Vedral uses the initial effort of Archimedes of Syracuse in calculating the amount of sand that could theoretically fit inside the universe and compares it to a modern-day attempt to calculate the bit content of the universe. Vedral however sees this content as ultimately limitless as possibly maximum entropy is never reached as compression of complexity is an open ended process and random events will continue to occur. As Vedral sees information as the ultimate building block of physical reality, he speculates that information originating at any scale can force outcomes in all other scales to abide where mutual information is shared. For example, a human performed macro-level scientific test in search of a behaviour in a quantum particle could set parameters for that type of particle in the future when subjected to a similar test.

=== "Destruction ab Toto: Nothing from Something" ===
The information basis for creation ex nihilo. According to John von Neumann, starting trivially from an empty set of numbers an infinite sequence of numbers can bootstrap their way out. An empty set creates the number 1 by observing an empty set within itself which is enough of a basis for distinguishability. It creates the number 2 by observing an empty set within the second empty set and the number 1, and so on. Vedral sees this not as creation but as data compression, as every event of a reality breaks the symmetry of the pre-existing formlessness. Science is the process of describing a large amount of observed phenomena in a compressed programmatic way to predict future outcomes, and in this process of data compression science creates new information by eliminating all contrary possibilities to explain those phenomena.

== Synopsis ==
The book explains the world as being made up of information.

== See also ==
- The Information: A History, a Theory, a Flood by James Gleick
- Decoding the Universe by Charles Seife
