= Chrononaut =

Chrononaut ('time traveller') or chrononauts may refer to:

- Chrononauts (game), a family of card games based on time travelling
- Chrononauts (comics), a comic book series based on time travelling
- Chrononauts, time travellers in TV series Seven Days

== See also ==
- Time Travel (disambiguation)
- Time Traveler (disambiguation)
- Time Machine (disambiguation)
