= Timber Tower =

Timber Tower may refer to:

- Plyscraper, a skyscraper constructed (at least partly) out of wood, occasionally referred to as a Timber Tower.
- Timber Tower, a now replaced amusement park ride in Dollywood.
- Merritt Island Launch Area Radar Range Boresight Tower
