= Programming the Universe =

2006 book by Seth Lloyd

Programming the Universe: A Quantum Computer Scientist Takes On the Cosmos
- Softcover edition
- Author: Seth Lloyd
- Language: English
- Subject: Quantum mechanics, quantum computers
- Genre: Nonfiction
- Publisher: Alfred A. Knopf
- Publication date: 2006
- Publication place: United States
- ISBN: 978-1-4000-4092-6
- OCLC: 423500375
- Dewey Decimal: 530.12 22
- LC Class: QC174.12 .L57 2006

Programming the Universe: A Quantum Computer Scientist Takes On the Cosmos is a 2006 popular science book by Seth Lloyd, professor of mechanical engineering at the Massachusetts Institute of Technology. The book proposes that the Universe is a quantum computer (supercomputer), and advances in the understanding of physics may come from viewing entropy as a phenomenon of information, rather than simply thermodynamics. Lloyd also postulates that the Universe can be fully simulated using a quantum computer; however, in the absence of a theory of quantum gravity, such a simulation is not yet possible. "Particles not only collide, they compute."

== Reaction ==
Reviewer Corey S. Powell of The New York Times writes:

In the space of 221 dense, frequently thrilling and occasionally exasperating pages, ... tackles computer logic, thermodynamics, chaos theory, complexity, quantum mechanics, cosmology, consciousness, sex and the origin of life—throwing in, for good measure, a heartbreaking afterword that repaints the significance of all that has come before. The source of all this intellectual mayhem is the kind of Big Idea so prevalent in popular science books these days. Lloyd, a professor of mechanical engineering at M.I.T., takes as his topic the fundamental workings of the universe..., which he thinks has been horribly misunderstood. Scientists have looked at it as a ragtag collection of particles and fields while failing to see what it is as a majestic whole: an enormous computer.

In an interview with Wired magazine, Lloyd writes:

everything in the universe is made of bits. Not chunks of stuff, but chunks of information—ones and zeros. ... Atoms and electrons are bits. Atomic collisions are "ops." Machine language is the laws of physics. The universe is a quantum computer.

Gilbert Taylor, writing in Booklist of the American Library Association, said that the book:

offers brilliantly clarifying explanations of the "bit," the smallest unit of information; how bits change their state; and how changes-of-state can be registered on atoms via quantum-mechanical qualities such as "spin" and "superposition." Putting readers in the know about quantum computation, Lloyd then informs them that it may well be the answer to physicists' search for a unified theory of everything. Exploring big questions in accessible, comprehensive fashion, Lloyd's work is of vital importance to the general-science audience.

== See also ==
- Digital physics
- Decoding the Universe, a 2007 book by Charles Seife
- Seth Lloyd
- Simulation hypothesis
- Simulated reality
