= The Information: A History, a Theory, a Flood =

2011 book by James Gleick

- Cover of the Pantheon first edition
- Author: James Gleick
- Cover artist: Peter Mendelsund
- Language: English
- Genre: Popular science
- Publisher: Pantheon Books (US), Fourth Estate (UK)
- Publication date: March 1, 2011 (US), March 31, 2011 (UK)
- Publication place: United States
- Media type: Print (Hardcover)
- Pages: 544
- ISBN: 978-0-375-42372-7
- LC Class: Z665 .G547 2011

James Gleick talks about The Information: A History, a Theory, a Flood on Bookbits radio

The Information: A History, a Theory, a Flood is a book by science history writer James Gleick, published in March 2011, which covers the genesis of the current Information Age. It was on The New York Times best-seller list for three weeks following its debut.

The Information has also been published in ebook formats by Fourth Estate and Random House, and as an audiobook by Random House Audio.

== Synopsis ==
Gleick begins with the tale of colonial European explorers and their fascination with African talking drums and their observed use to send complex widely understood messages back and forth between villages, and over even longer distances by relay. Gleick transitions from the information implications of such drum signaling to the impact of the arrival of long-distance telegraph and then telephone communication to the commercial and social prospects of the Industrial Revolution west. Research to improve these technologies ultimately led to our understanding the essentially digital nature of information, quantized down to the unit of the bit (or qubit).

Starting with the development of symbolic written language (and the eventual perceived need for a dictionary), Gleick examines the history of intellectual insights central to information theory, detailing the key figures responsible such as Claude Shannon, Charles Babbage, Ada Byron, Samuel Morse, Alan Turing, Stephen Hawking, Richard Dawkins and John Archibald Wheeler. The author also delves into how digital information is now being understood in relation to physics and genetics. Following the circulation of Claude Shannon's A Mathematical Theory of Communication and Norbert Wiener's Cybernetics many disciplines attempted to jump on the information theory bandwagon to varying success. Information theory concepts of data compression and error correction became especially important to the computer and electronics industries.

Gleick finally discusses Wikipedia as an emerging internet-based Library of Babel, investigating the implications of its expansive user-generated content, including the ongoing struggle between inclusionists, deletionists, and vandals. Gleick uses the Jimmy Wales-created article for the Cape Town butchery restaurant Mzoli's as a case study of this struggle. The flood of information that humanity is now exposed to presents new challenges, Gleick says. He argues that because we retain more of our information now than at any previous point in human history, it takes much more effort to delete or remove unwanted information than to accumulate it. This is the ultimate entropy cost of generating additional information and the answer to slay Maxwell's Demon.

== Reception ==
In The New York Times, Janet Maslin said it is "so ambitious, illuminating and sexily theoretical that it will amount to aspirational reading for many of those who have the mettle to tackle it." Other admirers were Nicholas Carr for The Daily Beast and physicist Freeman Dyson for The New York Review of Books. Science fiction author Cory Doctorow in his BoingBoing review called Gleick "one of the great science writers of all time", "Not a biographer of scientists... but a biographer of the idea itself." Tim Wu for Slate praised "a mind-bending explanation of theory" but wished Gleick had examined the economic importance of information more deeply. Ian Pindar writing for The Guardian complained that The Information does not fully address the relationship between social control of information (censorship, propaganda) and access to political power.

== Awards and honors ==
- 2012 Royal Society Winton Prize for Science Books, winner.
- 2012 PEN/E. O. Wilson Literary Science Writing Award, winner.
- 2012 Andrew Carnegie Medal for Excellence in Nonfiction, finalist.
- 2012 Hessell-Tiltman Prize, winner.
- 2011 National Book Critics Circle Award, finalist (Nonfiction).
- 2011 Salon Book Award (Nonfiction).
- 2011 New York Times Bestseller
- 2011 Time Magazine's Best Books of the Year

== See also ==
- Bell Labs – Research and scientific development company
- Decoding Reality: The Universe as Quantum Information, 2010 book by Vlatko Vedral
- Decoding the Universe, 2007 book by Charles Seife
- Information theory – Scientific study of digital information
- Meme – Cultural idea that spreads through imitation
- Turing machine – Computation model defining an abstract machine
