= Freestyle Music Park =

Defunct theme park in Myrtle Beach, South Carolina, U.S.

- Previously known as: Fantasy Harbour (initially planned); Hard Rock Park (2008 season)

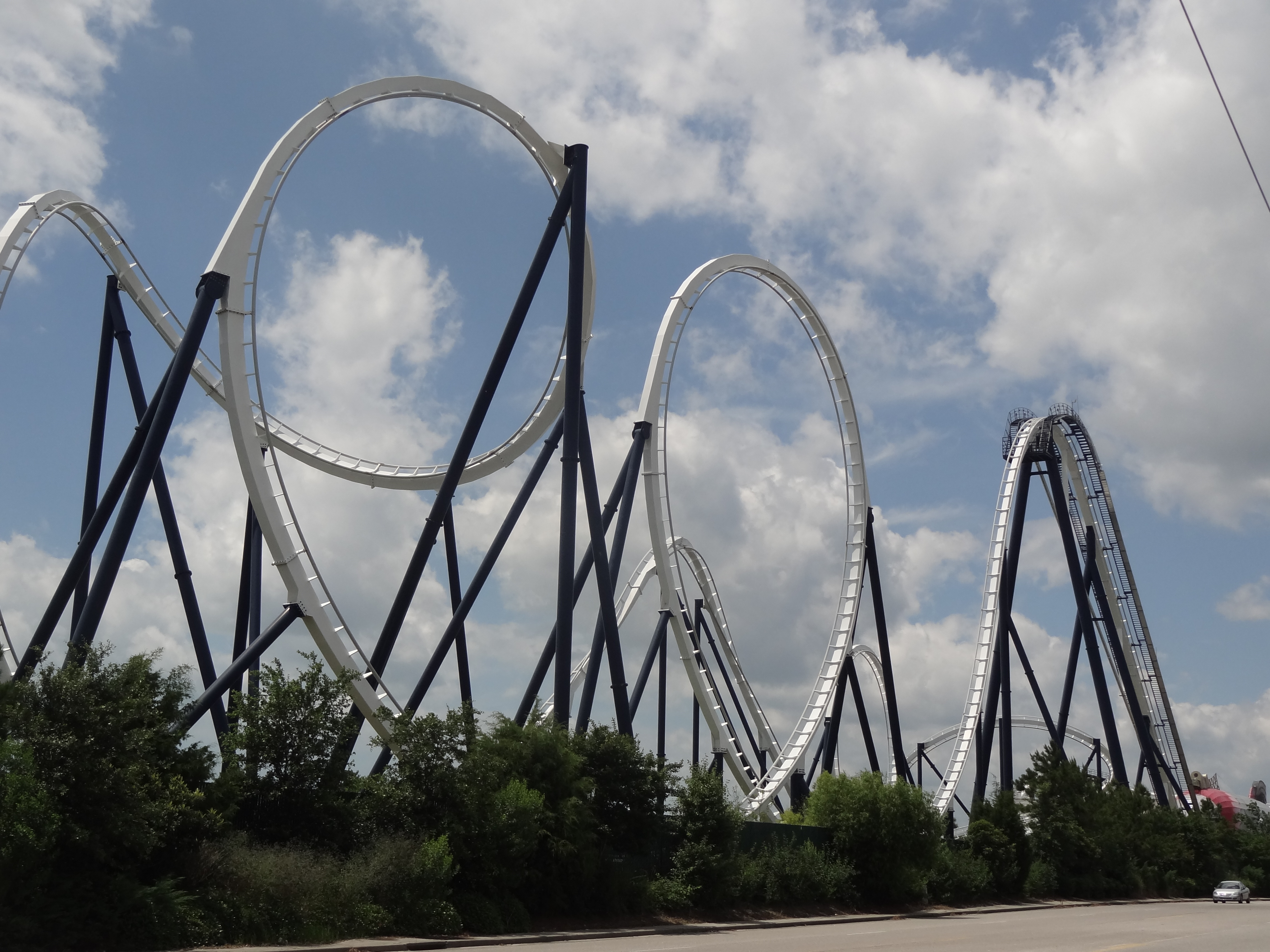
- The former amusement park in June 2013
- Interactive map of Freestyle Music Park
- Location: Myrtle Beach, South Carolina, United States
- Coordinates: 33.714°N 78.933°W
- Status: Defunct
- Opened: April 15, 2008; 18 years ago
- Closed: September 14, 2009; 17 years ago
- Owner: HRP Myrtle Beach Operations (2008 season); FPI MB Entertainment (May 2009 – August 2011); FPI US LLC/FPI US Holdings, Inc. (August 2011 – December 28, 2018); FTPP Bishop Parkway LLC (December 2018 – present)
- Theme: Rock and roll (2008 season); All genres of music (2009 season)
- Slogan: Where Rock Comes to Play (Hard Rock Park); Full Volume Family Fun (Freestyle Music Park)
- Operating season: Memorial Day weekend to Labor Day
- Area: 55 acres (22 ha)

Attractions
- Total: 50+
- Roller coasters: 5
- Other rides: 15+
- Shows: 7-8

Freestyle Music Park, formerly called Hard Rock Park, was a music-themed amusement park in Myrtle Beach, South Carolina. Built on 55 acres (22 ha), the park was located at the intersection of US 501 and the Intracoastal Waterway. It included part of the former Waccamaw Factory Shoppes in Fantasy Harbour, and its headquarters was located in Mall 3.

The park opened to the public on April 15, 2008, but following financial issues, it closed later that year on September 24. It reopened under the Freestyle brand on May 23, 2009, but it closed permanently at the end of the season due to mounting financial problems and lawsuits. The amusement park sat abandoned and was frequently vandalized until its complete demolition in February 2022 to develop a FedEx industrial center on the site.

== History ==
=== 1999–2008: Development and opening ===
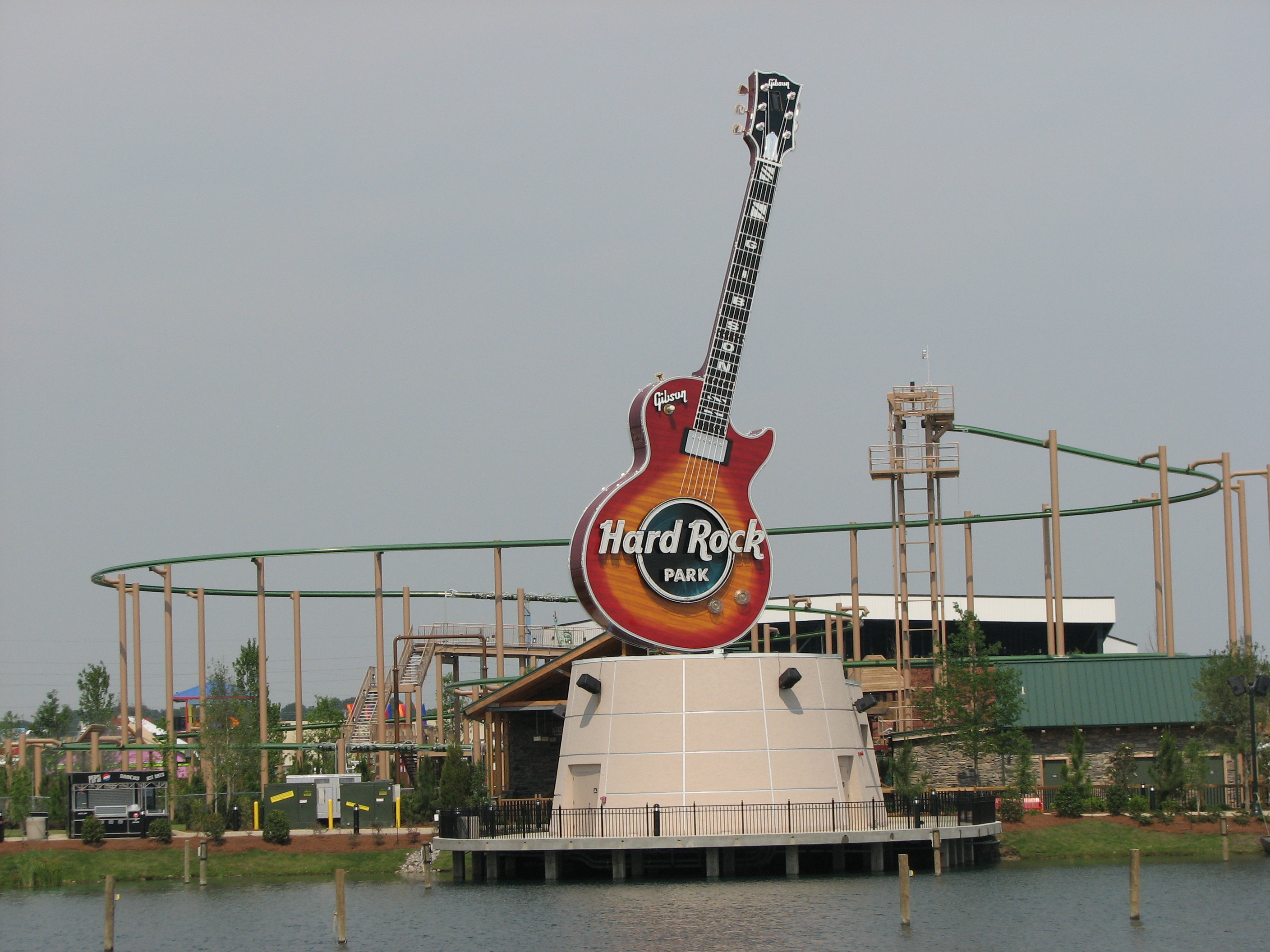
Hard Rock Park (May 2008)

Jon Binkowski, a businessman from Florida who had worked in the amusement-park industry, bought a small theater in Myrtle Beach, South Carolina, in 1999 or 2000. The theater, known as the Ice Castle, did not attract as many guests as Binkowski had expected. Binkowski and Rank Group executive Steven Goodwin began developing plans for an amusement park around the Ice Castle known as Fantasy Harbour. Early in the planning process, Binkowski and Goodwin considered theming the park to the four seasons of summer, spring, winter and fall. After investors said a season–themed amusement park would be too generic, Binkowski considered partnering with Metro-Goldwyn-Mayer to create an amusement park themed to MGM films, but this idea was too costly. Finally, in 2002, Binkowski proposed a Hard Rock Cafe–themed park in a late-night email to Goodwin, who himself had worked for Hard Rock Cafe in the late 1990s. They spent two hours drawing up plans for the park in a Kinko's store in Hollywood, Los Angeles.

Plans for a Hard Rock-themed amusement park were released in 2003, but at the time funding and licensing agreements had yet to be finalized. The park was budgeted at $250 million by January 2005, and Binkowski and Goodwin sought $25 million to $30 million from the government of Horry County, South Carolina. However, as Binkowski and Goodwin were reluctant to submit detailed business plans, members of the county council refused to approve the bond financing. AVX Corporation CEO Dick Rosen and other investors including Ziel Feldman and Safe Harbor Capital Partners managing partner Amnon Bar-Tur created two companies. Myrtle Property Owners I, which invested in the proposed theme park and Myrtle Property Owners II which bought land from Rosen with the intent to build a hotel along the Intracoastal Waterway in October 2005. A feasibility study predicted three million visitors a year in the park's first year, with growth of nine percent the second year and decreasing growth rates after that.

By 2006, a licensing agreement with Hard Rock Cafe International (USA), Inc. was reached, two days before the Ice Castle had been scheduled for foreclosure. The Hard Rock name was licensed from the Rank Group Plc and later the Seminole Tribe of Florida-owned Hard Rock International, owners and operators of the Hard Rock Cafe and Hard Rock Hotel and Casino brands as of March 2007, to HRP Myrtle Beach Operations, LLC, which designed and built the park, for a fee of $2.5 million per year. Africa Israel Investments owned the majority stake in the park. Investors also included Tim Duncan and AVX Corporation CEO Dick Rosen. Financing also included a loan of $385 million, though the park only cost $225 million to build. Most of the financing, about $305 million, was junk bonds. Real estate owners and investors in Myrtle Beach also agreed to give the project $37 million in cash, along with several parcels of land worth $25 million, if they could obtain a partial ownership stake in the park.

A groundbreaking for the park took place on July 13, 2006, although few details of the park had been announced by then. Due to the various unexecuted plans for the site over the years, many local residents were skeptical of whether the proposed park could be completed. As late as March 2007, few details had been revealed about the park, even though its operators had begun hiring the first of 3,000 employees and were looking for a $3 million tax abatement from the government of South Carolina. Details of Hard Rock Park were officially announced in April 2007 when its promoters began advertising the park in six cities. At the time of the announcement, Hard Rock Park was to be the first major new amusement park in the United States since Legoland California in 1999. The park's developers also opened a preview center where they displayed a scale model of the park, as well as renderings of attractions. Construction for the park took place during the same year. The park's primary attraction, Led Zeppelin The Ride, topped out during July 2007.

Even during Hard Rock Park's construction, questions arose over whether the park was viable. During the construction process, amusement industry expert Dennis Spiegel said the planned park was "questionable" since it could not operate year-round. Local businesspeople also expressed concerns about the projected guest counts, which they believed were overly high; according to Hard Rock Park's developers, the park was supposed to attract 30,000 guests per day. The park's financing consisted mostly of junk bonds, so the park would be forced to make extremely high interest payments on these bonds if they failed to meet the projected guest numbers. Park representatives planned to rely on word-of-mouth marketing instead of a dedicated marketing campaign, and they chose to only partner with certain "preferred" hotels rather than allowing all local hotels to sell tickets to the park. Although the park had been planned to operate for ten months per year, this ultimately turned out not to be the case.

=== 2008 season: Hard Rock Park ===
Following a soft opening in April 2008, Hard Rock Park officially opened on June 2, 2008, with a concert by Eagles and The Moody Blues. The park's opening ceremony was accompanied by a golf tournament that was closed to the public (although this had not been the original plan), where few celebrities showed up. The park featured six "rock environs" celebrating rock's culture, lifestyle, legends and irreverence. These rock environs included the All Access Entry Plaza, Rock & Roll Heaven, British Invasion, Lost in the 70's, Born in the US and Cool Country. At opening, the park had amusement rides, live shows, interactive elements, kids' play areas, gardens, shopping and dining attractions. The park included an amphitheater with 10,000-person capacity featuring live daily shows and special performances. The attractions were divided between six zones and included three major roller coasters, in addition to a water playground themed to the country of Jamaica, several stores, and a 1960s-themed cafe. The park's headquarters, an arcade, and one of the rides were located within the abandoned Waccamaw Factory Shoppes.

The park opened to positive reviews. The Times of London's writer Chris Haslam concluded that America's newest theme park brought the genre "from the preschool plastic of Disney to a new age of insubordinate adolescence through a combination of nerdy attention to detail, startling irreverence and sly wit." Beth J. Harpaz, Associated Press travel editor, declared Nights in White Satin: The Trip as one of her all-time favorite rides from any park. However, in light of the frozen credit markets during the 2008 financial crisis, the park could not secure sufficient financing to underwrite its planned advertising campaign. As the 2008 economic downturn deepened during the summer, high gas and hotel prices coupled with limited advertising by the park led to lower-than-expected attendance. The park cited "macroeconomic conditions that significantly depressed overall demand in the travel and leisure industry" and a lack of cash to advertise. The park had borrowed a lot of money and could not convince investors to provide more help to keep the park going.

Despite the park operators' reluctance to offer discounted tickets, they began offering discounted tickets during Black Bike Week, as well as to hospitality workers and to residents of the Carolinas. As early as the beginning of August 2008, Hard Rock Park was in danger of bankruptcy, in part because there were so few visitors, and the park did not have enough money in its reserves to offset its lagging attendance. Changes were made to operating hours and planned operating days. The original closing time of 1 a.m. was moved up to 10 p.m. in August and the park moved to weekend-only operations after Labor Day. With an earlier end-of-season planned on November 2, the park scheduled no concerts past August 30. Hard Rock Park recorded only 370,000 guests during the 2008 season.

=== 2008–2009: Early closure, bankruptcy and new owners ===
In September 2008, Africa Israel Investments decided to write off its entire $10 million investment in the park "due to liquidity difficulties the park is experiencing". Hard Rock Park then announced that they were ending the 2008 season over a month early, laying off most of the employees, and had filed for Chapter 11 bankruptcy protection. At the time of the filing, the park expressed hopes of reopening in 2009; the following month the company announced plans to sell the park. In January 2009, the company converted to Chapter 7.

In February 2009, the Delaware bankruptcy court declined to force an auction and approved the sale of the park to FPI MB Entertainment (FPI) for $25 million. FPI MB Entertainment was a joint venture of FPI US LLC, a company incorporated in Delaware, and MB Entertainment. The partners included Roundbox Advisors, Freestyle Park International, Baker Leisure Group, and two of the park's original owners, Thomas M. Hiles and D. Tim Duncan. Baker Leisure Group managed the day-to-day park operations. FPI had to completely re-skin and overhaul the park to comply with court rulings.

On April 2, 2009, the new owners announced that the Hard Rock name would be dropped. While Hard Rock International had been willing to continue use of the name if conditions could be met, the owners felt that changing the name would give the park a more positive image since the old name was connected with the bankruptcy; also, the "Hard Rock" name was not considered family-oriented. Because of the name change, the bankruptcy court required all Hard Rock souvenirs to be destroyed. Later that month, FPI unveiled a new name for the park: Freestyle Music Park, stating that it would pay homage to a variety of musical genres, including rock n' roll, country, reggae, beach music, pop, R&B, alternative, Christian, disco, and rap. The name does not refer to the Latin music genre, according to sales and marketing director John Stine.

In May 2009, HRP Creative Services Co. wanted to make certain attractions separate from the park the new owners planned, with former park CEO Steven Goodwin wanting the new owners to pay royalties. However, a Delaware federal judge said on March 30 that some of the previous owners still owned intellectual property rights relating to the original theme. The original owners then sued FPI, claiming they had not done enough to change the park, and that the new owners were using intellectual property that was not theirs. This action threatened to delay the reopening.

On June 22, 2009, the county planning commission agreed to change the name of Hard Rock Parkway to Fantasy Harbour Boulevard. FPI agreed to pay part of the cost for new signs. Businesses located on the road would have to pay their own expenses as the road, once called Outlet Boulevard, received its second name change in two years. By mid-September, five of the seven signs on the street itself had been changed.

=== 2009 season: Freestyle Music Park ===
The park reopened on May 23, 2009, with adult admission reduced to $39.95 ($29.95 for children) and annual passes to $64.95 ($39.95 for children). Additionally, the park offered three separate promotions during the 2009 summer season: $10 off for South Carolina residents, $17.76 for two admission tickets before 4 p.m. and $17.76 per admission ticket after 4 p.m. As a result of these discounts, the park also made less money than anticipated. By August, the price for two admission tickets had been raised to $19.95.

Aside from the renaming of the overall park, sections of the park also got new names; "Myrtle's Beach" (previously "Rock 'N' Roll Heaven") became a "tongue-in-cheek celebration of all things Polynesian," "Born in the USA" became "Kids in America," "British Invasion" became "Across the Pond," and "Cool Country" became "Country USA." The entrance changed names from "All Access Entry Plaza" to "VIP Plaza". FPI also introduced Kids in America, a 17,000-square-foot (1,600 m^{2}) children's section with four rides named after hit songs purchased from Zamperla of Italy. The rides are named "Get Off My Cloud," "Fly Like an Eagle," "Wheels in the Sky" and "Life Is a Highway." "CSI: Live", previously performed at Six Flags Magic Mountain near Los Angeles, was added to the park and was based on the CSI TV series.

As the park prepared to close at the end of the summer, FPI President Steve Baker said, "Overall, I'm real happy," and that "we're doing our best, and we're here to stay." Baker made these comments despite the fact that the economy and the park's past problems contributed to a less than spectacular first season. Many amusement parks were also having difficulties, said David Mandt of the International Association of Amusement Parks and Attractions. Dennis Spiegel, the consultant, said, "It's probably the largest catastrophe in our industry. Quite frankly the park shouldn't reopen." He said for the price FPI paid, they should have been able to make the park succeed. Spiegel said the park was too far from the beach. The park refused to disclose its attendance numbers for the 2009 season, although officials said admission was less than they had projected.

=== Summer 2009 – Winter 2016: Further problems and permanent closure ===
Throughout the season, a series of lawsuits were filed against the park, adding to the park's woes. The lawsuits were filed by Brandon Advertising (for $1.4 million) on August 5, 2009, and Roundbox Advisors LLC (for $360,000) on August 17, 2009. Baker explained that FPI MB would pay both creditors, saying that Freestyle Park had fewer problems than Hard Rock Park, but people were assuming the difficulties would continue, meaning that they were less patient. Tetra Financial Group also filed a lawsuit in September for lease payments, taxes and fees. In October 2009, FPI announced that they had lined up some new investors to help the park pay its debts. They signed a memorandum of understanding with the investors.

The agreement to purchase Hard Rock Park included paying $570,000 owed by the former park owners. In January 2010, the attorney for Hard Rock Park's trustee allowed an extension on that payment as the park searched for new investors. Court documents said the economic situation caused difficulties in making the payments. The park laid off 30 employees early that month. Even BMW sued FPI, alleging trademark infringement regarding the cars on the "Round About" ride resembling cars from Mini Cooper.

In February 2010, FPI attorney Tobey Daluz announced that the park would not open in March 2010 as planned. She said when or if the park opened depended on actions of investors who have not been identified. On March 29, 2010, lawyer David Slough said the park would not reopen unless investors allowed FPI to pay Hard Rock Park's debt by the deadline of April 1, 2010. He would not say how close investors were to a deal. On April 1, 2010, Slough said, "Currently, the park has no ability to make the payment." Foreclosure and even bankruptcy are now possibilities, but the park could still find investors and reopen, according to attorney Allen Jeffcoat. Court documents filed April 13, 2010, in federal bankruptcy court in Delaware say a court ruling will create a lien; the next step will likely be a Horry County court action leading to the park's sale. On June 29, 2010, a federal court awarded Tetra $14 million after Freestyle failed to answer the lawsuit. On June 30, 2010, Baker said the park was "aggressively" seeking new investors. Jeffcoat, who had no connection to the case, said Tetra would only be repaid after other creditors who already had claims.

On August 9, 2010, foreclosure proceedings were filed against Freestyle Music Park. Mortgage holder FPI US LLC seeks over $25 million from park owner FPI MB Entertainment LLC. Loan documents identified the general manager of FPI US LLC as Alexey (Alexei in most documents) Sidnev; Sidnev was a former partner in Moscow-based MT Development, an investor in Freestyle Park that had planned a similar park in Europe. Court filings showed FPI US LLC is a division of MT Development. On August 20, FPI MB Entertainment responded to the foreclosure action, admitting the amount of debt is correct and that it cannot pay. Four out of five creditors responding to the foreclosure claimed FPI US and FPI MB were the same company and that FPI US should not have first claim to park assets. FPI MB attorney Nate Fata denied this. In an August 24, 2010, interview, Baker said the park's entire board had resigned, except for one member appointed by Russian investors who would work to sell the park. Baker, who continued to head Baker Leisure Group, believed the park could succeed under new owners.

VenCore Solutions, which leased items such as radios and shelves to Hard Rock Park, continued its agreement with Freestyle Park. On September 8, VenCore, claiming FPI MB owes the company over $1 million was granted the right to repossess the property. FPI MB stated in a letter that VenCore was correct that the property "is currently uninsured and not subject to a hurricane contingency plan."

In December 2011, FPI US which received the property in an August foreclosure auction, filed papers showing it had mortgaged the property for $20 million, money that the company's attorney said was needed for maintenance and other expenses until a sale. Land for a proposed hotel which was never built was later sold in a foreclosure auction on July 2, 2012.

Three months before the Summer 2012 season, Alain Wizman of Keller Williams, who had been looking for buyers, said Freestyle appeared unlikely to make a return before 2013. However, on April 18, 2013, local Myrtle Beach newspaper My Horry News reported that local Christian nonprofit arts group Abiding Village launched a campaign to generate enough money to buy the former park minus the rides for $10 million and convert the old park into an education and entertainment complex. An official with Freestyle gave the group three weeks to come up with the resources to purchase the land and buildings, according to Abiding Village officials. On May 7, it was announced via The Sun News that with five days left Abiding Village had raised only $1 million of the $10 million goal. On May 13, WBTW and WMBF-TV reported the Abiding Village would not call the old theme park home. The group held a yard sale on May 12, 2013, and later that evening the group's website listed the total as $155,789.82. Abiding Village reps said that they were hopeful that they would still be able to buy the land in the future.

Martin Durham, the park's former vice president for entertainment, said many factors led to the park's demise, but the biggest culprit was the recession that hit right as it opened.

On November 12, 2013, local media reported that Freestyle Music Park was trying to sell off many of the rides from the venture. This was despite earlier rumors that Baker had plans to move the Freestyle rides to a park he planned to open in Orlando, Florida. Dozens of the rides were listed for sale with Nashville-based Ital International; exceptions were the Wave Swinger and Balloon Race, previously sold to Seabreeze Amusement Park. On December 20, 2013, The Sun News reported that the 13-acre Family Kingdom Amusement Park had purchased The Magic Bikes and Jump Around Dunebuggies, two interactive family rides which were the right size for the park. In late July 2014, dismantling and removal of the other rides began. As of August 11, 2014, Ital International no longer listed the rides, and it was reported that other rides were being shipped out of the US, possibly to Vietnam. Being taken down was the roller coaster known as The Eagles' Life In The Fast Lane. Other rides from the park already had been sold. As of February 2015, all of the rides had been dismantled. They were reassembled in Asia Park in Da Nang, Vietnam with the exception of the Led Zeppelin/Time Machine, Maximum RPM!/Round About, and Slippery When Wet/Soakd’ coasters (They were set up, but never operated and were dismantled in 2017). The track has appeared in Ha Long, Vietnam at a new park called Dragon Park Ha Long. Both parks have the same owner. The ride opened in 2017 under the name Dragon's Run.

On February 20, 2014, The Sun News reported that Medieval Times Dinner & Tournament bought roughly four acres of the park which it used prior to 2008 for its horses to exercise and graze.

Area government officials visited China in February 2016 and reported that investors had plans for a $100 million development on the site.

=== Sale of former park property ===
On January 1, 2019, it was reported that the former Hard Rock/Freestyle Music Park property of approximately 125.14 acres as well as several other parcels was sold by FPI US LLC. to FTPP Bishop Parkway LLC for $3,545,000. Former Myrtle Beach Mayor John Rhodes had repurchased the old park property a few days prior, on December 28, 2018, although Rhodes's involvement was not reported until late February 2019. Rhodes said that he was not sure of what he wanted to do with the property, saying that only that any development would take advantage of the waterway and that "it will not be another theme park." Rhodes applied for demolition permits but did say some buildings might remain.

Rhodes, managing partner of the new ownership group, stated on April 6, 2019, that he did not have any immediate plans for the property, and that he was not against selling the property undeveloped. Rhodes stated that he was in no rush to develop the property as there might be others who wanted it more than he did. He did state that he had some ideas for the property, but that he had to find out from his contractor if any of his ideas would work with the existing buildings.

=== Suspicious fires ===
On February 17, 2019, fire officials were called just before midnight to the former Hard Rock/Freestyle Music Park for a three-alarm fire. By about 3:00 a.m., the fire was out and investigators were working the scene. The cause of the blaze was not immediately known, but was later deemed suspicious by fire investigators and local police.

On June 30, 2019, a debris/structure fire broke out at the former amusement park. A preliminary investigation by fire officials indicates that the two separate fires were not "of an accidental ignition." A witness told police that they saw smoke coming from the park and a group of people leaving the site. They were able to provide police with a license plate number, but no arrests in connection to the case have been made. Local police continue to investigate.

On September 6, 2019, at 5:20 a.m., fire officials responded to a reported commercial structure fire, located in the ticketing area near a former park entrance. Flames were visible upon arrival, but the fire was under control within about 30 minutes, with no reported injuries. There are no indications that the fire was suspicious, and the investigation is ongoing.

=== Redevelopment ===
On October 10, 2019, it was reported that Horry County received a rezoning application in which the property owner is requesting an update to the Planned Development District and to allow for additional uses on a portion of the site. The 112-acre (45 ha) property was, at the time, zoned for only theme park use and possible uses for the property were to be presented during a planning and zoning workshop on November 7, where leaders decided on what possible uses would be permitted at the former amusement park, and the owner of the land confirmed the future development of the property would not be another amusement park.

On June 24, 2021, it was announced that any chance of the former park site being redeveloped into an amusement area would all but disappear if Horry County officials approved a land use change request for the property. It was expected that the county planning commission would make a recommendation to expand the distribution district on the site to 125 acres, which would eliminate most of the amusement uses at what is now a former $400 million theme park. If the land change was approved, then 27 types of businesses would be allowed on the property ranging from vehicle and equipment maintenance to RV and boat storage or even wholesale and distribution.

On July 9, 2021, it was announced that the following night the Horry County planning commission would approve the expansion of the Planned Development District, but that Horry County council would still need to approve the next step before the project could move forward. There are more than 30 possible uses, but an exact use had not been decided, though the developer indicated willingness to use it for a small packaging site or even using it for something transportation related.

On February 1, 2022, it was reported that a permit application for a FedEx distribution facility at the site of the former parks was being reviewed by Horry County government officials. A commercial permit application for an approximately 250,000-square-foot facility was filed the previous month and followed a stormwater permit application for part of the property that was filed in December on behalf of Beach Ford RV. On October 4, 2022, it was announced that FedEx is planning to invest nearly $64 million investment on the property that was once the theme park. In return for the investment FedEx would get a deduction in its property tax rate, only paying on 6% of its assessed value rather than 10.5% for the next 20 years, according to an agreement that was released by county officials on October 4.

== Former attractions ==
=== Roller coasters ===
Hard Rock Park		Freestyle Music Park		Manufacturer	Type	Status	Ref(s)
Name	Area	Name	Area	Manufacturer	Type	Status	Ref(s)
Eagles Life in the Fast Lane	Cool Country	Iron Horse	Country USA	Vekoma	Mine Train roller coaster	Relocated to Sun World Danang Wonders	
A mine train roller coaster that would take riders through a creepy abandoned lumber mill. The ride was originally set to be named Midnight Rider; however, the coaster was renamed after it was announced that the soundtrack would be set to Eagles, and named for their 1977 hit song.
Led Zeppelin: The Ride	Rock & Roll Heaven	Time Machine	Myrtle's Beach	Bolliger & Mabillard	Steel roller coaster	Relocated to Dragon Park	
The ride stood 150 feet (46 m) tall, and had a top speed of 65 mph (105 km/h). Other features included six inversions, a spiral over the existing lagoon, and an on-ride video system. When originally operating as Led Zeppelin – The Ride, guests were treated to a unique multimedia Led Zeppelin live-concert experience during the pre-show. The ride was most notable for active participation of surviving Led Zeppelin band members Jimmy Page, Robert Plant and John Paul Jones, who contributed to all aspects of the ride, including the ride name, logo and overall look and feel of the vehicles. The Led Zeppelin properties were licensed from C + P Eighty-Six Ltd. Under Freestyle Music Park, the ride was set to the music of the 1960s to the 2000s.
Maximum RPM!	British Invasion	Round About	Across the Pond	Premier Rides	Steel roller coaster	Relocated to Sun World Danang Wonders	
A convertible car-coaster that races to 1980s hits, particularly Gary Numan's "Cars". Riders go for a test drive through a mock factory in British sports cars. The coaster features a first-of-its-kind ferris wheel lift hill, where the coaster trains are rolled from the bottom of the track onto a ferris wheel-like contraption and then pushed off at the top into a high speed adventure. The ride building somewhat resembles Battersea Power Station with an inflatable pig, in reference to the cover of Pink Floyd's Animals album. Automaker BMW sued the park in 2010 over the similarity of the attraction's ride vehicle to the plaintiff's Mini Cooper. Never operated at its new home until it was dismantled later around 2017.
Shake, Rattle & Rollercoaster	Born in the USA	Hang Ten	Kids in America	Vekoma	Junior roller coaster	Relocated to Sun World Danang Wonders	
A classic boardwalk-themed kiddie roller coaster.
Slippery When Wet	Born in the USA	Soak'd	Kids in America	Premier Rides	Suspended roller coaster	Relocated to Sun World Danang Wonders	
A suspended roller coaster that featured an interactive experience permitting non-riders to fire water cannons as the roller coaster trains passed by, at the risk of themselves being drenched by overhead showers that fired at random. Like Maximum RPM!, it never operated at its new home and was later dismantled around 2017.

=== Other attractions ===
Hard Rock Park		Freestyle Music Park		Manufacturer	Type	Status	Ref(s)
Name	Area	Name	Area	Manufacturer	Type	Status	Ref(s)
All the King's Horses Carousel	British Invasion	Carnaby Carousel	Across the Pond	Chance Rides	Grand Carousel	Closed	
Garage Jam	Lost in the 70s	Grunge Station	Across the Pond	Prime Interactives	Ball play area	Closed	
Games	Lost in the 70s	Ring My Bell	Across the Pond		Upcharge attraction	Closed	
Just a Swingin'	Cool Country	The Texas Swing	Country USA	Bertazzon	Wave Swinger	Relocating to Seabreeze Amusement Park	
Kids Rock! State Park	Born in the USA	Fantasy Harbour State Park	Kids in America	Rope Courses, Inc.	Ropes course	Closed	
London Cab Ride	British Invasion	McGillivray Cab Company	Across the Pond	HUSS Park Attractions	Rodeo (London cabs)	Relocated to Sunworld Danang Wonders	
Magic Mushroom Garden	British Invasion	Faerie Glen	Across the Pond	HUSS Park Attractions	Airboat	Relocated to Sunworld Danang Wonders	
A Scrambler-style ride featuring the "World's largest blacklight poster."
Muddin' Monster Race	Cool Country	Big Ol' Trucks	Country USA	HUSS Park Attractions	Bee Bee	Relocated to Sunworld Danang Wonders	
Nights in White Satin: The Trip	British Invasion	Monstars of Rock	Across the Pond	Sally Corp. / ETF	Dark ride	Closed	
Was a dark ride based on The Moody Blues' "Nights in White Satin". The ride incorporated sights, sounds, smells and tactile effects, onboard ride vehicle audio, a purpose-made movie written to the spoken word section of the song, and a re-orchestrated version of the iconic song by Justin Hayward. Guests entered through a bead curtain and wore chroma-depth 3-D glasses during the ride. Nights was voted in the top three new attractions of 2008 in a themeparkinsider.com annual poll.
Pinball Wizard Arcade	Lost in the 70s	Who's Tommy Arcade	Across the Pond		Arcade	Closed	
The Punk Pit	Born in the USA	Jump	Across the Pond		Bounce house	Closed	
Reggae River Falls	Rock & Roll Heaven	Polly Nesian's Splash Bash	Myrtle's Beach		Water play area	Closed	
Sole Train	Born in the USA	Cuckoo-Ka-ChooChoo	Kids in America	Zamperla	Rio Grande	Closed	
—N/a		Fly Like An Eagle	Kids in America	Zamperla	Kite Flyer	Closed	
—N/a		Get Off Of My Cloud	Kids in America	Zamperla	Balloon Race	Relocating to Seabreeze Amusement Park	
—N/a		Kids' Tree House	Kids in America	Henderson	Treehouse playground	Closed	
—N/a		Life Is A Highway	Kids in America	Zamperla	Convoy	Closed	

=== Shows ===
Hard Rock Park		Freestyle Music Park		Manufacturer	Type	Status	Ref(s)
Name	Area	Name	Area	Manufacturer	Type	Status	Ref(s)
Bohemian Rhapsody	All Access Entry Plaza	Kiss the Sky	VIP Plaza		Fireworks and laser show	Closed	
Bohemian Rhapsody was a nighttime show held over the lagoon, set to the classic song by Queen. The show featured fountains, fireworks and a laser-light show displayed from the top of the giant Gibson Guitar icon. The fireworks and lasers returned for Kiss the Sky.
Ice House Theatre	Cool Country	Ice Cold Country	Country USA		Ice show	Closed	
Originally showed "Country on the Rocks", a rock-themed show set on ice. Freestyle Music Park saw the theatre present an ice show set to country and southern rock music. Situated in a former Fantasy Harbour-era ice skating theater subsumed into the amusement park.
Live Amphitheater	Born in the USA	Stars theatre	Kids In America			Closed	
The main stage used for a series of headline acts, specialty musicians, high school bands as well as being the location of the opening-day Eagles/Moody Blues concerts. Bowling for Soup were the first band to play at the venue.
Malibu Beach Party	Rock & Roll Heaven	Adrenaline Rush	Myrtle's Beach			Closed	
Malibu Beach Party was a live-action comedy show set to all the great beach classics and some modern day pop songs. A cast of dancers and swimmers danced, dove, performed stunts on motorcycles and interacted with the crowd in a lakefront/poolside amphitheater. During Freestyle Music Park's operation the stunt show consisted of skateboards, bicycles and rollerblades.
Origins	All Access Entry Plaza	Beale Street Theatre	VIP Plaza		Film presentation	Closed	
A film presentation showing the history of rock n roll and how it is intertwined with theme parks.
Phonehenge Stage	British Invasion	—N/a			Performance stage	Demolished	
A performance area equipped with red British-style phone boxes arranged to resemble Stonehenge. Featured Fireeater/sword-swallower/juggler Lukas Dudek.
Roadies Stunt Show	British Invasion	CSI: Live	Across the Pond		Show	Closed	
Roadies Stunt Show was a twist on the popular stunt show concept with rock and roll 'roadies' as characters. This show featured many 'cirque'-type elements and numerous pyrotechnic effects. It was replaced by CSI: Live, based on the TV series. Investigators would try to determine who committed a murder at a magic show, with audience members considered suspects.

Flip 5 Live!-Stars Theatre-Kids In America This was "a high energy, interactive show that rocked the house." The 11 characters were named Kira, Kimmy, Dot, Spin, Chase, Bounce, Trip, Jive, Jam, Cali and Zach. They sang original and cover songs from the past and present.

== In media ==
On October 26, 2010, the book Grand Strand by former park employee Reid Barwick, became available for purchase online. Many of the details of the fictional "Rocktime Amusement Park" match those of the real story of Hard Rock and Freestyle Music Parks. However, the book contains fraudulent deals which Baker denies took place.

The park was used as a set on an episode of the TV series Revolution. Several rides and the park itself was used as the scene of a post-apocalyptic amusement park.
