= The Pipeline =

American Internet service provider

The Pipeline was one of the earliest American Internet service providers. It was founded in December 1993 in New York City by the science and technology writer James Gleick and computer programmer Uday Ivatury, who had met at the Manhattan Bridge Club and shared an interest in online bridge. Both men believed that a graphical user interface would make the Internet more widely accessible than the command-line Unix commands that were then generally necessary.

When the Pipeline was established, the major online services of the day—America Online, CompuServe, and Prodigy—provided their users with no access or very limited access to the internet. Many users welcomed Pipeline as "AOL for the Internet". The software was distributed in the then-popular Book + CD format.

The Pipeline was noted for its point-and-click user interface, which made e-mail, chat, Usenet, the World Wide Web, FTP, and other Internet features easily accessible to users. Gleick and Ivatury licensed the Pipeline software through InterCon Systems Corporation to more than 15 other Internet service providers, including Ireland On-Line and Caltech.

The Pipeline was purchased in February 1995 by PSINet, which expanded Pipeline service nationwide. Another feature introduced by PSInet was flat pricing for unlimited Internet usage.

In July 1996, PSINet sold its consumer Internet operations, including the Pipeline, to MindSpring. MindSpring discontinued the use of the Pipeline brand, although former Pipeline customers could continue to use their e-mail addresses in the Pipeline domain. Three years later, MindSpring merged with EarthLink. Earthlink, too, allows former Pipeline customers to use their Pipeline e-mail addresses.
