= Time Travel =

Time travel usually refers to the hypothetical activity of traveling into the past or future.

Time Travel may also refer to:

- "Time Travel", a Rob & Big episode
- Time Travel (Alessi's Ark album)
- Time Travel (Dave Douglas album)
- Time Travel (Never Shout Never album)
- Time Travel: A History, a 2016 non-fiction book by James Gleick
- Big Brother: Time Travel, the subtitle of the 28th season of CBS's reality competition series Big Brother

== See also ==
- Time Traveler (disambiguation)
- Time Machine (disambiguation)
- Time travel claims and urban legends
- Time travel in fiction
- Mental time travel
