= Zero: The Biography of a Dangerous Idea =

2000 book by Charles Seife

- Softcover edition
- Author: Charles Seife
- Language: English
- Subject: Zero, nothingness
- Genre: Non-fiction
- Published: February 7, 2000
- Publisher: Viking Adult
- Publication place: United States
- Media type: Print, e-book
- Pages: 256 pp.
- ISBN: 978-0670884575
- Followed by: Alpha & Omega

Zero: The Biography of a Dangerous Idea is a non-fiction book by American author and journalist Charles Seife. The book was initially released on February 7, 2000, by Viking.

== Background ==
The book offers a comprehensive look at number 0 and its controverting role as one of the great paradoxes of human thought and history since its invention by the ancient Babylonians or the Indian people. Even though zero is a fundamental idea for the modern science, initially the notion of a complete absence got a largely negative, sometimes hostile, treatment by the Western world and Greco-Roman philosophy.

Zero won the 2001 PEN/Martha Albrand Award for First Nonfiction Book.

== Review ==
Of course, Seife's book is not a typical biography. There are no tell-all interviews with the number one or any of zero's other neighbors on the number line... Seife's book begins—of course—at Chapter Zero, with a story of how only recently a divide by zero error in its control software brought the guided missile cruiser USS Yorktown grinding to a halt. As Seife relates, "Though it was armored against weapons, nobody had thought to defend the Yorktown from zero. It was a grave mistake." Maybe it's not the pulse-pounding drama of a Tom Clancy novel, but it's enough foreshadowing to launch Seife on an essay which begins with notches on a 30,000-year-old wolf bone and ends with the role of zero in black holes and the big bang.

— Mathematical Association of America

== See also ==
- Creation ex materia
- Empty set
- Everything
- Ex nihilo
- Mu
- Names for the number 0 in English
- Negative theology
- Nihilism
- No
- Zero
