= Time Machine =

A time machine is a fictional or hypothetical device for time travel.

Time Machine or The Time Machine may also refer to:

== Literature ==
- The Time Machine, an 1895 novel by H. G. Wells
- Time Machine (short story series), a 1959–1989 feature in Boys' Life magazine
- Time Machine (novel series), a 1984–1989 series of children's adventures
- The Time Machine, a 2013 audiobook in the Doctor Who: Destiny of the Doctor series

== Film ==
- The Time Machine (1960 film), a film by George Pal
- The Time Machine (1978 film), a made-for-television version
- Time Machine: The Journey Back, a 1993 documentary film
- The Time Machine (2002 film), a film by Simon Wells
- Time Machine (unfinished film), an unfinished Bollywood science-fiction film

== Television ==
- "The Time Machine", Davey and Goliath season 1, episode 9 (1961)
- "Time Machine", Astro Boy (1963 TV series) episode 11 (1963)
- "Time Machine", The Flintstones season 5, episode 18 (1965)
- "The Time Machine", Rocket Robin Hood season 1, episode 2a (1966)
- "The Time Machine", Space Ghost episode 12a (1966)
- "The Time Machine", Astro Boy (1980 TV series) episode 27 (1981)
- Time Machine (game show), a 1985 American television series
- "The Time Machine", Iznogoud episode 8 (1995)
- "The Time Machine", Aahat season 1, episode 47 (1996)
- "Time Machine", Cow and Chicken season 1, episode 7b (1997)
- "Time Machine", Upright Citizens Brigade season 1, episode 8 (1998)
- "The Time Machine", The 1900 House episode 1 (1999)
- "The Time Machine", Celebrity Deathmatch season 2, episode 4 (1999)
- "The Time Machine", The New Adventures of Robin Hood season 4, episode 11 (1999)
- "Time Machine", The Brak Show season 1, episode 3 (2001)
- "The Time Machine", Balamory series 4, episode 7 (2005)
- "Time Machine", Naked Science season 5, episode 14 (2008)
- "Time Machine", Aqua Teen Hunger Force season 6, episode 6 (2009)
- "Time Machine", Beavis and Butt-Head season 8, episode 17 (2011)
- "The Time Machine", Alien Encounters season 3, episode 6 (2014)
- "The Time Machine", Father Brown series 3, episode 11 (2015)
- "Time Machine", The Wild Adventures of Blinky Bill episode 11b (2016)
- "Time Machine", Dancing with the Stars: Juniors episode 7 (2018)
- "The Time Machine", Qumi-Qumi episode 18 (2018)
- "Time Machine", Deadliest Catch season 17, episode 4 (2021)
- "The Time Machine", F4 Thailand: Boys Over Flowers episode 10 (2022)

== Music ==
- Time Machine (Russian band) or Mashina Vremeni, a Russian rock band formed in 1969
- Time Machine (hip hop group), formed in 1999

=== Albums ===
- The Time Machine (Gary Burton album), 1965
- Time Machine (Rick Wakeman album), 1988
- Time Machine (video) by American heavy metal band Dio, 1990
- Time Machine (Joe Satriani album) or its title track, 1993
- The Time Machine (Alan Parsons album), 1999
- The Time Machine (soundtrack) from the 2002 film
- Time Machine (Axxis album), 2004
- Time Machine (Nektar album), 2013
- Time Machine (EP) by American singer-songwriter Fousheé, 2021
- Time Machine (Alma album), 2023

=== Songs ===
- Time Machine (composition), a 2003 orchestral piece by Michael Daugherty
- "Time Machine" (Girls' Generation song), 2011
- "Time Machine" (Alicia Keys song), 2019
- "Time Machine", a 1969 song by Grand Funk Railroad from On Time
- "Time Machine", a 1970 song by Mick Softley
- "Time Machine", a 1971 song by Beggars Opera from Waters of Change
- "Time Machine", a 1992 song by Black Sabbath from Dehumanizer
- "Time Machine", a 1997 song by Chara from Junior Sweet.
- "Time Machine", a 2000 song by Heavenly from Coming from the Sky
- "Time Machine", a 2007 song by T-Pain from Epiphany
- "Time Machine", a 2008 song by Jay Chou from Capricorn
- "Time Machine", a 2009 song by Cracker from Sunrise in the Land of Milk and Honey
- "Time Machine", a 2010 song by Robyn from Body Talk
- "Time Machine", a 2012 song by ミラクルミュージカル from Hawaii: Part II
- "Time Machine", a 2014 song by Ingrid Michaelson from Lights Out
- "Time Machine", a 2017 song by Theory of a Deadman from Wake Up Call
- "Time Machine", a 2018 song by State Champs from Living Proof
- "The Time Machine", a 2021 song by Iron Maiden from Senjutsu

== Other uses ==
- Time Machine (macOS), a backup utility for macOS
- Time Machine (roller coaster), a roller coaster at Freestyle Music Park in Myrtle Beach, South Carolina
- Time Machine VR, a 2016 adventure simulation video game by Minority Media
- "Time Machine", the 18th installment of the animated short series The Misfortune of Being Ned (2014)

== See also ==
- Time Travel (disambiguation)
- Time Traveler (disambiguation)
- Wayback Machine
