= Alpha & Omega (book) =

Book by Charles Seife

- Hardcover edition
- Author: Charles Seife
- Language: English
- Subject: Cosmology
- Genre: Non-fiction
- Publisher: Viking/Penguin Group
- Publication date: 2003
- Publication place: United States
- Media type: Print, e-book
- Pages: 294 pp.
- ISBN: 978-0670031795
- Preceded by: Zero: The Biography of a Dangerous Idea (2000)
- Followed by: Decoding the Universe (2007)

Alpha & Omega: The Search for the Beginning and End of the Universe is the second non-fiction book by Charles Seife, published by Viking, a division of Penguin Putnam, in 2003.

== Background ==
It is a survey of historic and contemporary efforts at cosmology: to describe the universe, trace the universe back to its origins, including the Big Bang Theory, and to determine the universe's eventual end-state. The books title refers to the Alpha and Omega appellation for Christ, as found in the Book of Revelation. A paperback reprint was published in 2004, also from Penguin.

== Table of contents ==
- Preface
1. "The First Cosmology: The Golden Age of the Gods"
2. "The First Cosmological Revolution: The Copernican Theory"
3. "The Second Cosmological Revolution: Hubble and the Big Bang"
4. "The Third Revolution Begins: The Universe Amok"
5. "The Music of the Spheres: The Cosmic Microwave Background"
6. "The Dark Universe: What's the Matter with Matter?"
7. "Darker Still: The Enigma of Exotic Dark Matter"
8. "The Big Bang in Our Backyard: The Birth of Baryons"
9. "The Good Nus: The Exotic Neutrino"
10. "Supersymmetry: Fearlessly Framing the Laws of Matter"
11. "Seeing the Invisible: MACHOs, WIMPs, and Illuminating the Darkest Regions of the Universe"
12. "The Deepest Mystery in Physics: Λ, the Vacuum, and Inflation", Λ being the symbol for the Cosmological constant
13. "Wrinkles in Spacetime: Gravitational Waves and the Early Universe"
14. "Beyond the Third Revolution: Voyage to the Ends of Time"
- "Appendix A: Tired Light Retired"
- "Appendix B: Where Does Matter Come From?"
- "Appendix C: Nobel Prizes in Physics—Past and Future" Seife predicts which scientists are likely to win a Nobel Prize for their work in cosmology.
- "Appendix D: Some Experiments to Watch"
- Glossary, Select Bibliography, Acknowledgements, Index

== Reception ==
The New York Times praised the book, describing it as "A primer on the history and state of cosmology that is easy to read and understand… Seife's book shines." The Los Angeles Times described it as "provid(ing) a wonderfully clear and concise introduction to terms often too loosely bandied about, and to their interrelationships in the ongoing attempt of physicists to erect a unified theory of the universe."
