= Ivette Fuentes =

Mathematical Physics professor

Ivette Fuentes Guridi (other names: Ivette Fuentes, Ivette Fuentes-Schuller)
- Education: Imperial College London
- Scientific career
- Workplaces: University of Southampton; University of Nottingham; Perimeter Institute; University of Oxford; National Autonomous University of Mexico; University of Waterloo; University of Vienna
- Thesis: Entanglement and geometric phases in light-matter interactions (2003)

Ivette Fuentes (born 7 October 1972) is a Professor of Quantum Physics at the University of Southampton and Emmy Fellow (Fellow by Special Election) at Keble College, University of Oxford. Her work considers fundamental quantum mechanics, quantum optics and their interplay with general relativity. She is interested in how quantum information theory can make use of relativistic effects.

== Early life and education ==
Fuentes was born and raised in Mexico. Whilst she was at high school she was interested in dance and considered becoming a professional ballet dancer. Fuentes studied physics at the National Autonomous University of Mexico and graduated in 1997. She worked with Deborah Dultzin on Seyfert galaxies. Whilst at UNAM Fuentes won a competition to spend a summer at Fermilab and she decided that she wanted to continue working in physics. Fuentes earned her doctoral degree at Imperial College London in 2003 under the supervision of Peter Knight and Vlatko Vedral. She moved to the Perimeter Institute for Theoretical Physics as a postdoctoral fellow, where she worked until 2006. In 2004 she was selected as a University of Oxford Junior Research Fellow and joined Mansfield College, Oxford. She was appointed an Alexander von Humboldt fellowship to join Technische Universität Berlin.

== Research and career ==
Fuentes is working on new ways to store and use information using quantum systems. She looks to use relativistic quantum mechanics to improve information tasks such as quantum cryptography and quantum teleportation. She demonstrated a quantum thermometer that could measure the temperature of Bose–Einstein condensates. Fuentes was awarded an Engineering and Physical Sciences Research Council Career Acceleration Fellowship and joined the University of Nottingham.

In 2015 Fuentes joined the University of Vienna where she is a member of the theoretical quantum optics group. She was awarded funding from the Foundational Questions Institute to study quantum theory. In 2017 Fuentes co-founded the Penrose Institute, an organisation that looks to test the scientific ideas of Roger Penrose. Unlike many researchers at Harvard and MIT, Fuentes rejected financial support from Jeffrey Epstein, citing ethical reasons.

Fuentes has spoken at New Scientist Live, where she discussed building equipment for quantum teleportation. She has worked with the expressionist artist Benjamin Arizmendi on an art – science project entitled "The Aesthetics of Entanglement".

=== Selected publications ===
- Fuentes-Schuller, Ivette (2005-09-14). "Alice falls into a black hole: entanglement in noninertial frames". Physical Review Letters. 95 (12) 120404. arXiv:quant-ph/0410172. Bibcode:2005PhRvL..95l0404F. doi:10.1103/PhysRevLett.95.120404. PMID 16197056. S2CID 6916397.
- Fuentes-Schuller, Ivette (2006-09-20). "Entanglement of Dirac fields in noninertial frames". Physical Review A. 74 (3) 032326. arXiv:quant-ph/0603269. Bibcode:2006PhRvA..74c2326A. doi:10.1103/PhysRevA.74.032326. S2CID 32704515.
- Fuentes-Schuller, Ivette (2003-04-23). "Geometric phase in open systems". Physical Review Letters. 90 (16) 160402. arXiv:quant-ph/0301037. Bibcode:2003PhRvL..90p0402C. doi:10.1103/PhysRevLett.90.160402. PMID 12731961. S2CID 17339486.
