= Decoding the Universe =

2007 book by American Charles Seife

- Softcover edition
- Author: Charles Seife
- Language: English
- Subject: Information theory
- Genre: Non-fiction
- Publisher: Viking/Penguin Group
- Publication date: January 30, 2007
- Publication place: United States
- Media type: Print, e-book
- Pages: 304 pp.
- ISBN: 978-0143038399
- Preceded by: Alpha & Omega (2000)
- Followed by: Sun in a Bottle (2008)

Decoding the Universe: How the New Science of Information Is Explaining Everything in the Cosmos, from Our Brains to Black Holes is the third non-fiction book by American author and journalist Charles Seife. The book was initially published on January 30, 2007 by Viking.

== Synopsis ==
In this book Seife concentrates on the information theory, discussing various issues, such as decoherence and probability, relativity and quantum mechanics, works of Turing and Schrödinger, entropy and superposition, etc.

== Review ==
The cosmos, as Seife depicts it, is a great big information swap meet. Objects enormous and minuscule are always encountering other objects and being affected by them in such a way that they “gather information” — not consciously, of course, but in the way that the mercury collected information about my boiling syrup. A pool ball that’s hit by another pool ball receives information about the speed and direction of the ball that hit it. Subatomic particles do the same. Of course, subatomic particles do a lot of things that are much more baffling than this, like existing in two different places at the same time until someone or something tries to locate them. But, as Seife argues, information still lies at the root of all this. “Decoding the Universe” offers a history of the development of information theory, too, beginning with the cryptographers of World War II.

—Salon

== Similar books on the information theory ==
- Leon Brillouin, Science and Information Theory, Mineola, N.Y.: Dover, [1956, 1962] 2004. ISBN 0-486-43918-6
- James Gleick, The Information: A History, a Theory, a Flood, New York: Pantheon, 2011. ISBN 978-0-375-42372-7
- A. I. Khinchin, Mathematical Foundations of Information Theory, New York: Dover, 1957. ISBN 0-486-60434-9
- H. S. Leff and A. F. Rex, Editors, Maxwell's Demon: Entropy, Information, Computing, Princeton University Press, Princeton, New Jersey (1990). ISBN 0-691-08727-X
- Tom Siegfried, The Bit and the Pendulum, Wiley, 2000. ISBN 0-471-32174-5
- Jeremy Campbell, Grammatical Man, Touchstone/Simon & Schuster, 1982, ISBN 0-671-44062-4
- Henri Theil, Economics and Information Theory, Rand McNally & Company - Chicago, 1967.
- Escolano, Suau, Bonev, Information Theory in Computer Vision and Pattern Recognition, Springer, 2009. ISBN 978-1-84882-296-2
- Seth Lloyd, Programming the Universe, Alfred A. Knopf, 2006.
