= Time Traveler =

Time Traveler(s) or Time Traveller(s) may refer to:

- Time traveler, a person who engages in time travel

== Film and television ==
- The Time Travelers (1964 film), a science fiction film by Ib Melchior
- Time Travelers (1976 film), a telefilm starring Sam Groom
- Time Traveller: The Girl Who Leapt Through Time, a 2010 Japanese film
- The Lovers (2013 film) or Time Traveller
- "The Time Travelers" (How I Met Your Mother), an episode of How I Met Your Mother
- Time Traveler, a 1972 Japanese television series based on The Girl Who Leapt Through Time
- The Time Traveler, 1984 film aka The Next One by Nico Mastorakis
- The Time Traveler, a 1993 TV documentary by Norman Lewis
- Time Traveler, a 2001 compilation of three episodes of Where on Earth Is Carmen Sandiego?
- Time Traveler, the pre-launch proposed name for Investigation Discovery

== Literature ==
- The Time Travellers, a 2005 novel by Simon Guerrier
- The Time Traveller (fanzine), a science fiction fanzine started in 1932
- Time Travelers Quartet, a series of young adult books by Caroline B. Cooney
- Gideon the Cutpurse or The Time Travelers, a 2006 children's novel by Linda Buckley-Archer
- "The Time Traveller" (short story), a 1990 short story by Isaac Asimov
- Time Traveler: A Scientist's Personal Mission to Make Time Travel a Reality, a 2006 book by Ronald Mallett
- Time Travelers, Ghosts, and Other Visitors, a 2003 collection of short stories by Nina Kiriki Hoffman
- "The Time-Traveler", a story by Spider Robinson in Callahan's Crosstime Saloon
- The Time Traveller, the protagonist of The Time Machine by H. G. Wells

== Music ==
- Time Traveler (album) (Garth Brooks, 2023)
- Time Traveller (Keith LeBlanc album) (1992)
- Time Traveller (The Moody Blues album) (1994)
- Time Traveller, a 2011 album by Chris Norman
- Time Travellers, a 1992 album by O Terço
- Time Traveler, a 2006 album by Rahul Sharma
- Time Traveller, a 1980 album by Billy Thorpe
- "Time Traveler", a 1997 song by Angelo from Planet Gemini

== Video games ==
- Time Travelers (video game), a 2012 video game developed by Level-5
- Time Traveler (1980 video game), an adventure game
- Time Traveler (video game), a 1991 arcade game

== Other uses ==
- Time Traveler (roller coaster), a roller coaster at Silver Dollar City
- Time Traveler, a 1999 trick puzzle by Stave Puzzles

== See also ==
- Chrononaut (disambiguation)
- Time Machine (disambiguation)
- Time Travel (disambiguation)
