= Nights in White Satin: The Trip =

Freestyle Music Park
- Area: British Invasion
- Status: Removed
- Opening date: April 15, 2008
- Closing date: 2009

Ride statistics
- Attraction type: Dark ride
- Manufacturer: Sally Corporation
- Length: 718 ft (219 m)
- Capacity: 1200 riders per hour
- Vehicles: 20
- Duration: 4:45

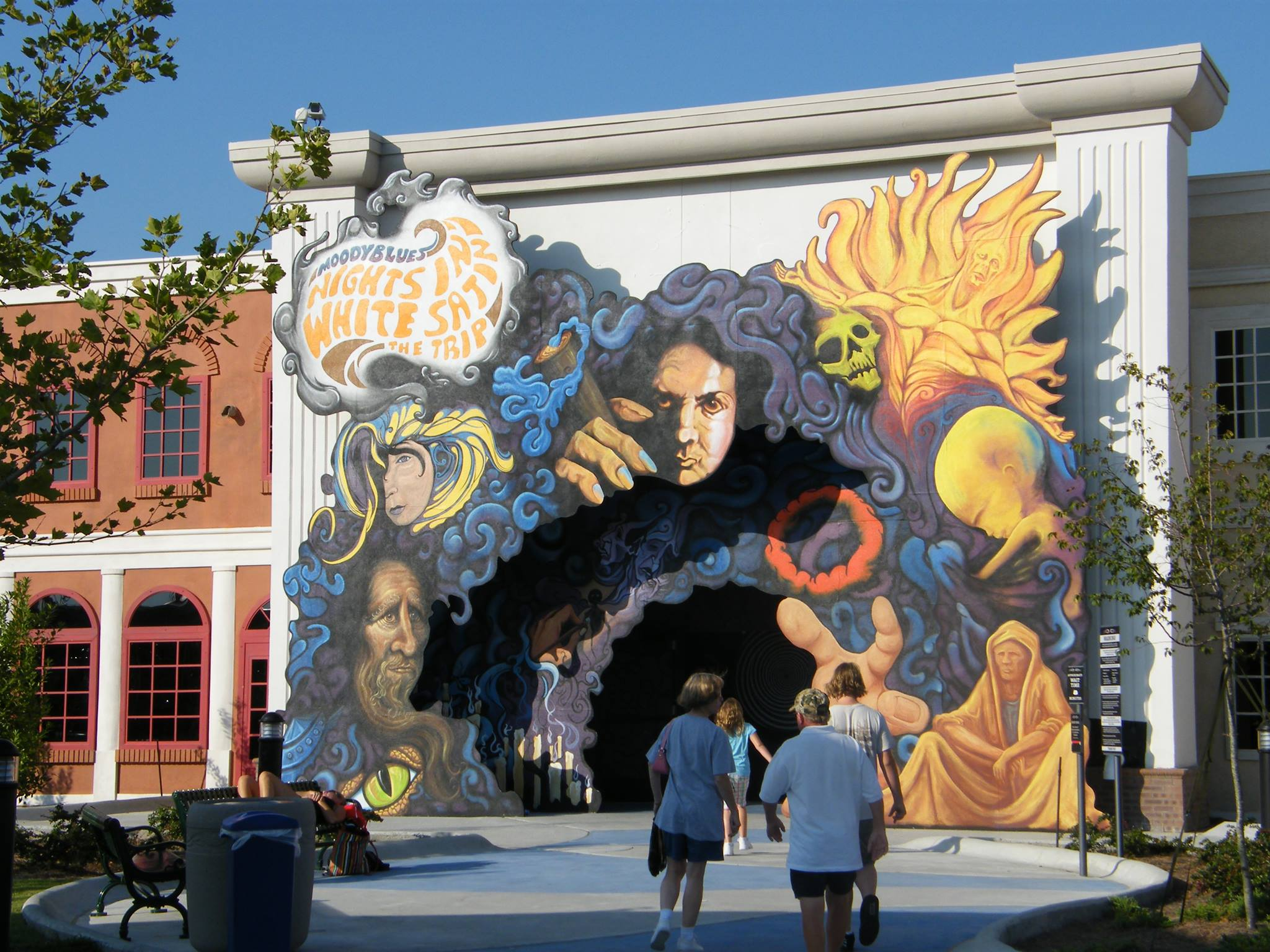
Facade of the dark ride "Nights In White Satin - The Trip" during the 2008 operating season of Hard Rock Park in Myrtle Beach, South Carolina.

Nights in White Satin: The Trip was a theme park ride located at Hard Rock Park (later Freestyle Music Park) in Myrtle Beach, South Carolina, and was based on the song "Nights in White Satin" by The Moody Blues. It was a dark ride that incorporated visual effects, digital CGI, and special effects installed by Attraction Design Services; it utilized sights, sounds, and smells. The attraction was developed by Sally Corporation and Jon Binkowski of Hard Rock Park. In early 2009, as a part of Hard Rock Park's new management, the ride was redesigned to fit a more family oriented theme, and renamed "Monstars of Rock".

== The ride ==
20 cars from ETF Ride Systems of the Netherlands accommodated 1,200 people per hour over 718 feet (219 m) of track and past 14 scenes, many using black lights and various psychedelic imagery. The Moody Blues recorded a new version of the song "Nights in White Satin" for the attraction, timed to match the length of the ride.

The ride was 4 minutes and 45 seconds in duration.

The high-fidelity sound system found in each car was provided by JL Audio and a custom-designed 24-volt amplifier system. The fidelity of this system is considered to be quintessential to the experience and was a major point in the design of the attraction. “The biggest challenge was providing good on-board audio,” confirms Binkowski.
