= Topple Tower =

Amusement ride

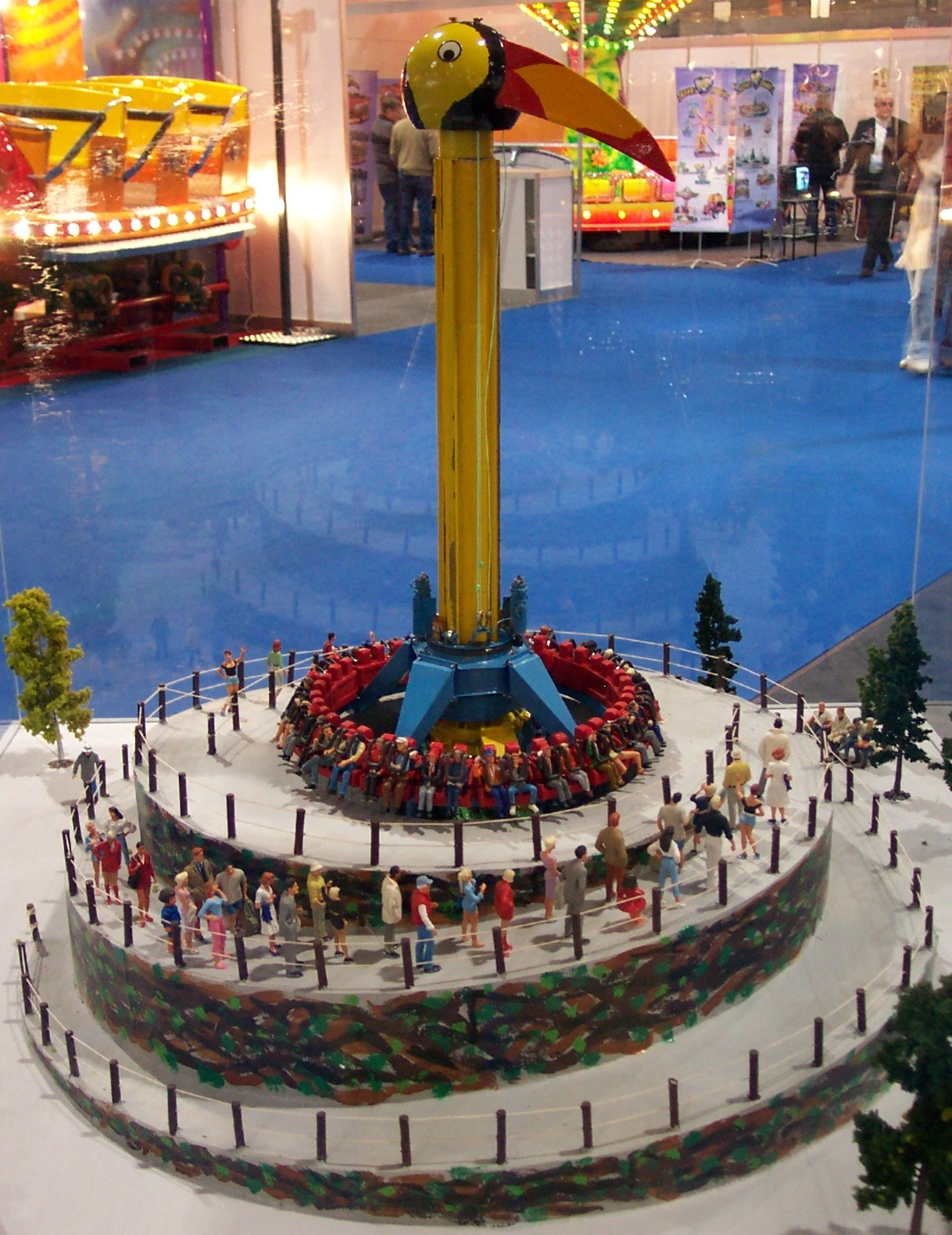
Scale display model of a Topple Tower

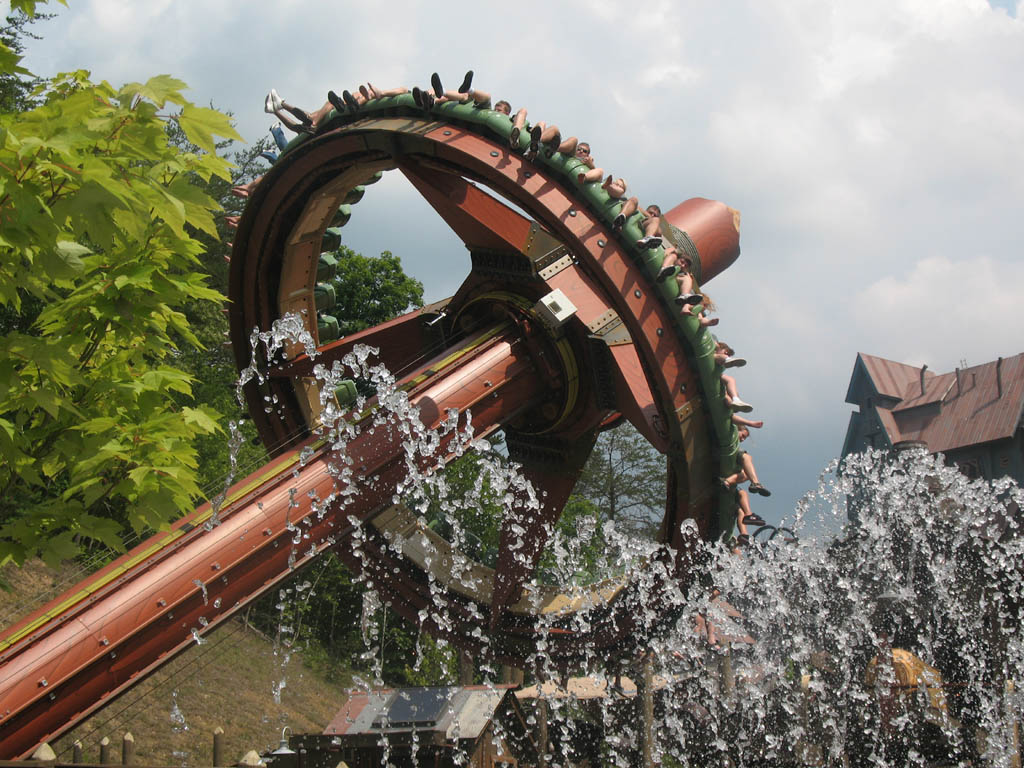
Timber Tower at Dollywood in operation. This installation was enhanced with the use of water effects

A Topple Tower is an amusement ride designed in 2001 by van Orsouw Amusement Rides Design Service of Berghem, Netherlands. The first design was rejected due to its difficult and heavy construction. After a re-design in 2002, a license agreement was closed, and the ride was produced in 2005 by Huss Maschinenfabrik GmbH, now HUSS Park Attractions. The first Topple Tower, El Volador, was placed in 2005 at Bellewaerde Park in Belgium.

== Design and operation ==
The Topple Tower consists of a single 40-person circular gondola, centred on an 18-meter tower. Passengers sit in the gondola, facing outward. When the ride cycle is started, the gondola is raised towards the top of the tower, and begins to rotate at between 9 and 11 rpm. When the rotating gondola reaches the top of the tower, the tower itself begins to rock back and forth.

After the bankruptcy of the Huss Maschinenfabrik GmbH in July 2006, a lawsuit against the new Huss company, (Huss Park Attractions) was held in November 2008 at Düsseldorf court, in which the Design Company, van Orsouw Amusement Ride Design Service (van Orsouw ARDS) claimed all the rights of the design of the Topple Tower. There were rumours that van Orsouw ARDS was, in fact, a blind-trust company of another, until today unknown, Amusement Ride manufacturer. Following the conclusion of the trial, no noteworthy design activities of van Orsouw ARDS have been observed, though legally the company still exists. Future buyers of the Topple Tower, therefore, run the risk of the blind trust company becoming active again and resuming litigation.

== Installations ==
Ride	Park	Country	Opened	Closed	Details
El Volador	Bellewaerde	Belgium	2005	Uncertain	First Topple Tower built. The ride is closed, with its future reopening uncertain.
Tang'Or	Walygator Parc	France	2005	2013	Relocated to Dragon Park Ha Long
Ørnen	Djurs Sommerland	Denmark	2006	2018	
Timber Tower	Dollywood	United States	2006	2012	Situated in middle of 5,100 square-foot pond. Replaced with Drop Line, a drop tower, for 2017 season.
Topple Tower	Marineland of Canada	Canada	2007	2011	Standing but not operating for several years before removal.
Adventure Jungle	Mysterious Island	China	2007	2022 or earlier	Adventure jungle permanently closed in 2022 or earlier.
Crazy Crane	Dragon Park Ha Long	Vietnam	2017	2026	Relocated from Walygator Parc. Crazy Crane remained active till closure Dragon Park.

== Incidents ==
On June 16, 2007, the Topple Tower installation (known as Timber Tower) at Dollywood became stuck after a faulty safety sensor engaged. The tower was in an upright position with the gondola at the top. The safety system would not let operators override the sensor, leaving 40 passengers stranded on the ride, some for as many as 6 hours. As of the 2012 season, Dollywood has removed Timber Tower from the park, with a lawsuit between Huss and Dollywood resolved behind closed doors. In 2017, Dollywood opened a new ride in place of Timber Tower called Drop Line.
