= Dragon's Run =

Steel roller coaster

- Previously known as Time Machine and Led Zeppelin: The Ride
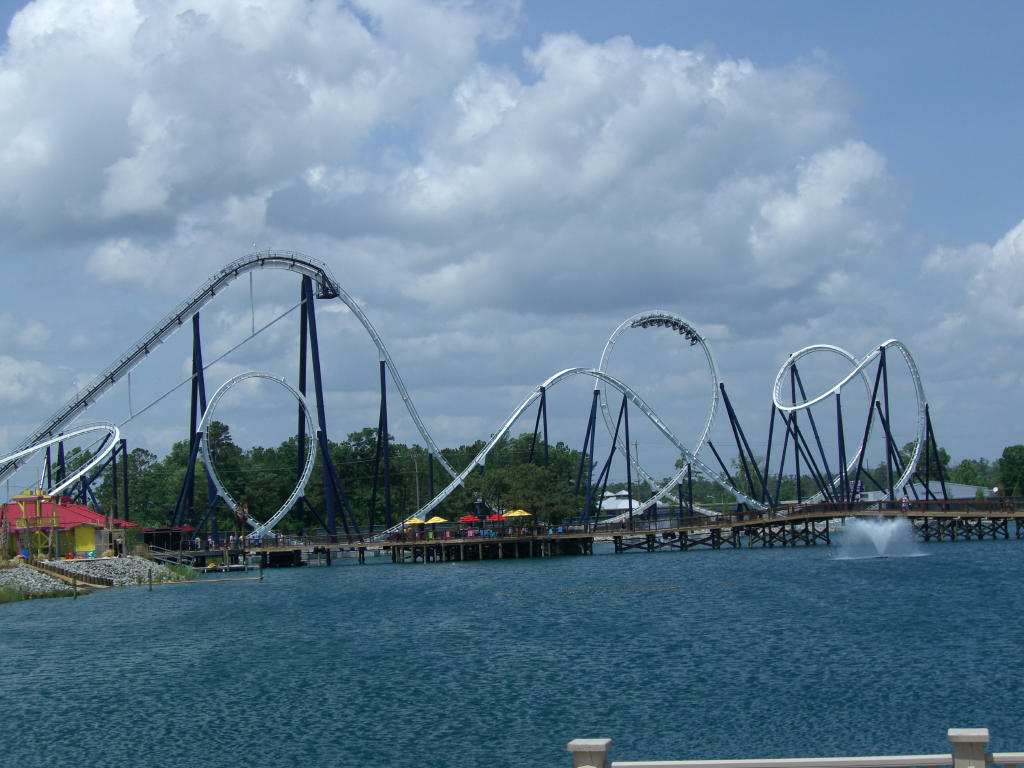
- View of most of the Dragon's Run layout when it was Time Machine

Dragon Park Ha Long
- Coordinates: 20.954139°N 107.047806°E
- Status: Operating
- Opening date: January 25, 2017

Freestyle Music Park
- Coordinates: 33.715335°N 78.935674°W
- Status: Removed
- Soft opening date: April 15, 2008
- Opening date: May 9, 2008
- Closing date: September 27, 2009

General statistics
- Type: Steel
- Manufacturer: Bolliger & Mabillard
- Model: Sitting Coaster
- Lift/launch system: Chain lift hill
- Height: 155 ft (47 m)
- Drop: 150 ft (46 m)
- Length: 3,738 ft (1,139 m)
- Speed: 65 mph (105 km/h)
- Inversions: 6
- Height restriction: 54 in (137 cm)
- Trains: 2 trains with 8 cars; riders arranged 4 across in a single row for a total of 32 riders per train
- Must transfer from wheelchair
- Dragon's Run at RCDB

Dragon's Run is a steel roller coaster manufactured by Swiss engineers Bolliger & Mabillard and located at Dragon Park Ha Long in Vietnam. The coaster was relocated from Freestyle Music Park in Myrtle Beach, South Carolina, where it last operated as Time Machine. The ride originally opened to the public on April 15, 2008, under the name Led Zeppelin: The Ride as one of the main attractions at Hard Rock Park. As a result of financial difficulties, Hard Rock Park closed after five months of operation. The park re-opened in 2009 with new owners and a new name, but closed at the end of the season. All of the rides and attractions were removed from the grounds, and Dragon's Run was disassembled and shipped to Dragon Park Ha Long in Vietnam, where it reopened in 2017.

== History ==
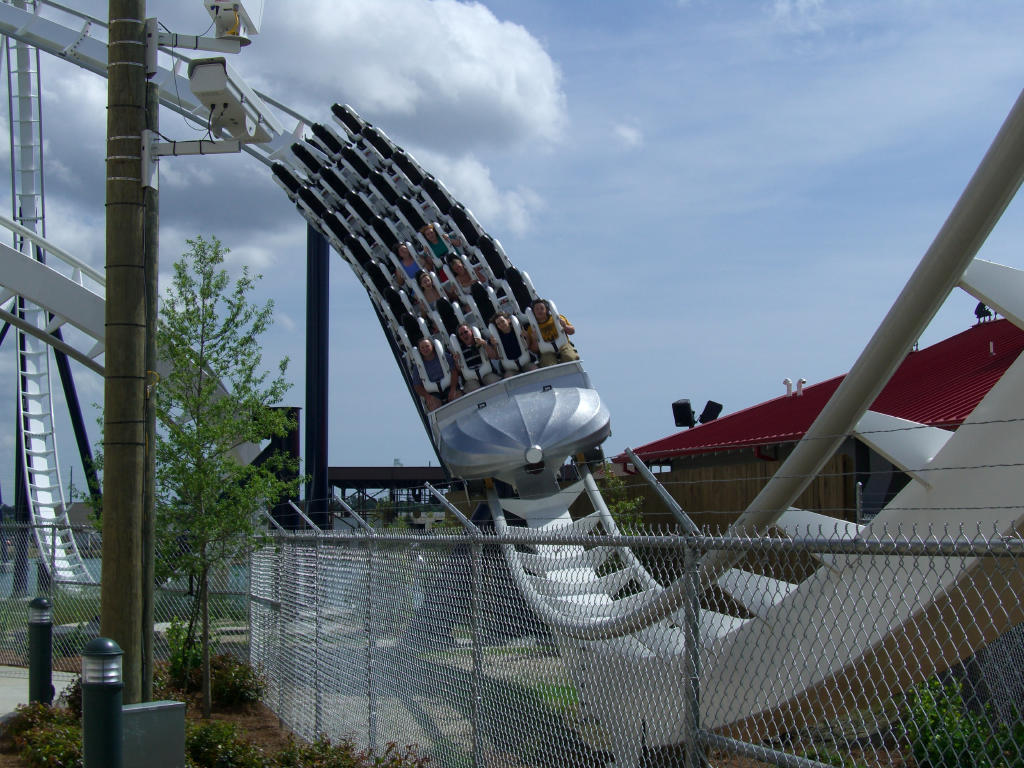
One of the Time Machine's trains descending from the mid-course brake run

Plans for a Hard Rock-themed amusement park were released in 2003; at the time, however, funding and licensing agreements had yet to be finalized. By 2006, a licensing agreement with the Hard Rock franchise was reached. Hard Rock Park was announced in early 2007. The park's flagship attraction, "Led Zeppelin – The Ride", would be a Bolliger & Mabillard sit-down roller coaster themed for the English rock band of the same name. By July 2007 construction for the ride was underway, with the lift hill completed.

"Led Zeppelin – The Ride" soft-opened to the public on April 15, 2008, with the first seats auctioned for charity. The ride's official opening was on May 9, 2008. During operation, the coaster would play Led Zeppelin's "Whole Lotta Love" through an on-board audio system. In September 2008, Hard Rock Park filed for Chapter 11 bankruptcy due to the inability to pay its debts. Its owners later filed for bankruptcy under Chapter 7, allowing them to sell the park.

In February 2009, FPI MB Entertainment purchased the park. As part of the acquisition it was renamed Freestyle Music Park, with all licensed themes removed. "Led Zeppelin – The Ride" was renamed "The Time Machine", with the on-board audio a selection of songs from the 1960s to the 2000s. The new park officially opened on May 23, 2009; however, the fate of Freestyle Music Park was similar to that of its predecessor and the park closed in September 2009. The coaster remained standing but not operating for almost five years.

The ride was posted for sale on talintl.com included in a bundle of components of the former Freestyle Music Park. In 2014 Time Machine was purchased by what was then a new, unnamed park under construction in Vietnam. On August 21, 2014, cranes had been set up next to the Time Machine to begin the process of dismantling, and elements of the finale had already been removed. On January 25, 2017, the ride opened as Dragon's Run at the new Dragon Park Ha Long in Vietnam.

== Characteristics ==
Dragon's Run features six inversions over the 3,738-foot-long (1,139 m) ride, including two vertical loops, a cobra roll, a zero-g roll and a corkscrew. Riders reach a top speed of 65 miles per hour (105 km/h). When the roller coaster operated as Time Machine, passengers could listen to five different soundtracks over speakers built into the trains. The trains consist of eight single-row cars, seating riders four across for a total of thirty-two seats per train.

== Ride ==
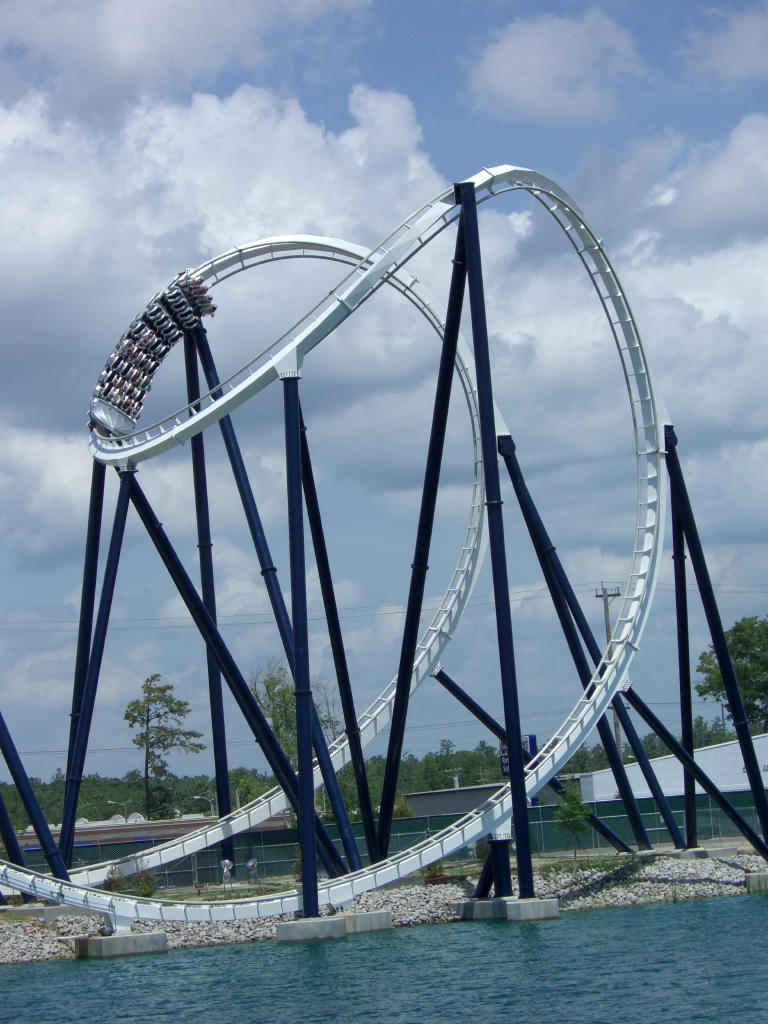
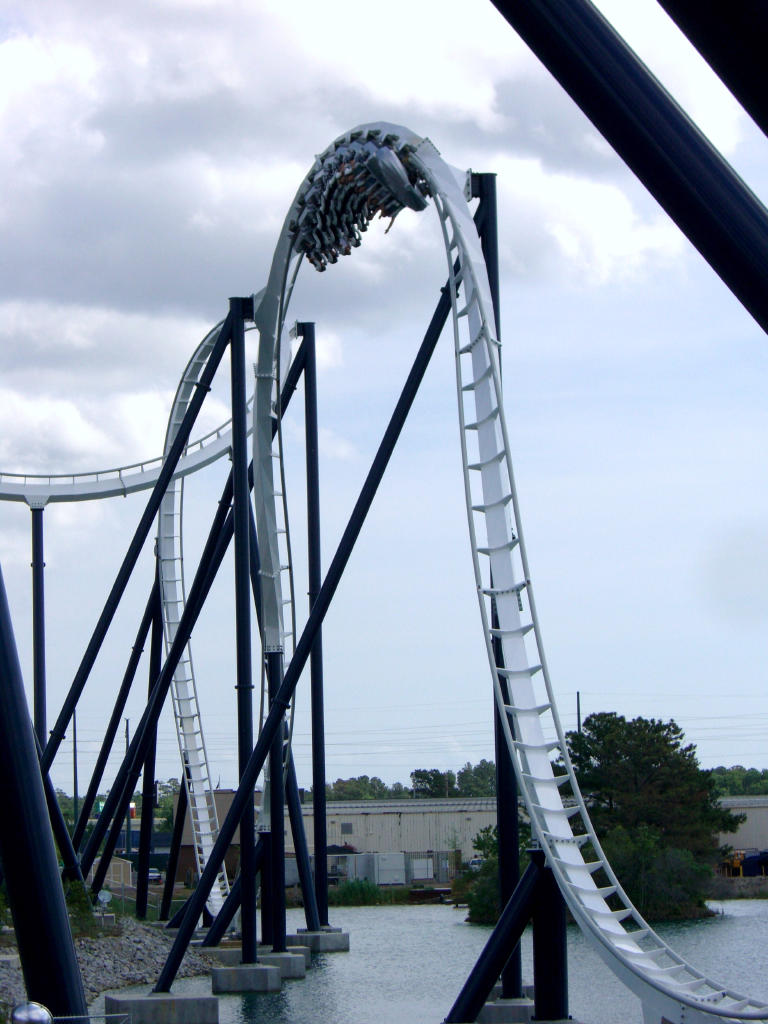
Trains navigating the cobra roll (left) and zero-g roll (right)

After the train leaves the station, it climbs the 155-foot-tall (47 m) chain lift hill. It then drops 150 feet (46 m) before entering the first 120-foot-tall (37 m) vertical loop. This is followed by a 95-foot-tall (29 m) cobra roll and a 75-foot-tall (23 m) zero-g roll. A second, smaller vertical loop leads the train into a large helix before the mid-course brake run. The ride then drops into another small helix before navigating through a corkscrew. A third helix follows before the train slows in the final brake run and returns to the station.

== Reception ==
Reviews of the Time Machine were mixed. The Coaster Critic, reviewing Led Zeppelin – The Ride, described its overall ride experience as a "great attraction", praising its pre-show and synchronized soundtrack and rating the ride 8.5 out of 10. Jeremy Thompson of Roller Coaster Philosophy gave a similar review, enjoying the ride and ranking it number 15 on his top-coasters list; however, he criticized the lack of elements during the ride's second half. Arthur Levine of About.com expanded on Thompson's criticism, calling the ride one of North America's top-10 overrated roller coasters. Levine described it as an "impressive-looking coaster" which "has almost no airtime, shudders a bit as it delivers a few head-banging moments, and is largely nondescript". In Mitch Hawker's worldwide Best Roller Coaster Poll, the Time Machine peaked at number 102 in its debut year (2008). In 2009, it dropped to 138th out of 368 ranked steel roller coasters.
