= Time Travel: A History =

2016 book by James Gleick

- Author: James Gleick
- Cover artist: Peter Mendelsund
- Language: English
- Genre: Popular science
- Publisher: Pantheon Books (US), Fourth Estate (UK)
- Publication date: September 27, 2016
- Publication place: United States
- Media type: Print (Hardcover)
- Pages: 352
- ISBN: 978-0307908797

Time Travel: A History is a book by science history writer James Gleick, published in 2016, which covers time travel, the origin of idea and of its usage in literature. The book received mostly positive reviews.

== Synopsis ==
In the book Gleick researches time travel, the emergence of this idea and its usage in literature, and how it shapes life of a modern person. In an interview for National Geographic Gleick said:

At some point during the four years I worked on this book, I also realized that, in one way or another, every time travel story is about death. Death is either explicitly there in the foreground or lurking in the background because time is a bastard, right? Time is brutal. What does time do to us? It kills us. Time travel is our way of flirting with immortality. It's the closest we’re going to come to it.

== Reception ==
The book received mostly positive reviews. Nicola Davis of The Guardian wrote that "Time Travel is intoxicating, but that is only in part down to Gleick's execution. Much of this is well trodden ground, our enduring fascination with the notion sown long ago by many adroit hands. At times, Gleick seems to get lost in his own, sometimes opaque, musings. Parts of the book are frustratingly repetitive, while his practice of paraphrasing obscure time travel stories before analysing their finer points too often feels like the dinner party anecdote that rather feebly concludes 'Well, you had to be there really'." Nick D Burton wrote for the Wired that the book "quantum leaps from HG Wells's The Time Machine – the original – via Proust and alt-history right up to your Twitter timeline. Until we get the DeLorean working for real, fellow travellers, consider it the next best thing". Anthony Doerr wrote for The New York Times that "Time Travel, like all of Gleick's work, is a fascinating mash-up of philosophy, literary criticism, physics and cultural observation. It's witty ("Regret is the time traveler's energy bar"), pithy ("What is time? Things change, and time is how we keep track") and regularly manages to twist its reader's mind into those Gordian knots I so loved as a boy."

Will Mann, reviewing the book for International Policy Digest, praised it though pointed out that

However, despite these praises, Gleick’s argument about the intersection between scientific discovery and art starts to dissipate towards the final third of the book. Some chapters, such as the penultimate one, entitled "What is Time?" less resembles a history of a subgenre within the greater science fiction canon and more resembles a heavy philosophic dissertation. Certainly, time travel is a concept that philosophers have tried to grasp and theorize about ever since its invention.

Dave Goldberg wrote for Nature Physics that "As to the practical possibility of time travel, Gleick is something of a sceptic. Common sense, he argues, suggests that the past really is immutable, no matter how clever the theoretical models that imply otherwise. And despite the apparent symmetry of the microscopic laws of physics, there really is, he argues, something different about the future and the past. 'The future hasn't been written yet. When did that become controversial?'"
