= Vlatko Vedral =

Serbian-born British physicist (1971-)

Vlatko Vedral FInstP
- Born: 19 August 1971 (age 55); Belgrade, Serbia
- Education: Belgrade Mathematical Gymnasium
- Alma mater: Imperial College London (BSc, PhD)
- Known for: Quantum information theory Quantum mechanics Quantum entanglement
- Awards: Royal Society Wolfson Research Merit Award (2007)
- Scientific career
- Fields: Quantum physics
- Workplaces: University of Oxford; University of London; University of Leeds; National University of Singapore (NUS); Centre for Quantum Technologies (CQT)
- Thesis: Quantum information theory of entanglement (1998)
- Doctoral advisors: Sir Peter Knight; Artur Ekert; Martin Bodo Plenio
- Doctoral students: Elham Kashefi; Ivette Fuentes; Libby Heaney
- Website: www.vlatkovedral.com

Vlatko Vedral FInstP (born 1971) is a Serbian-born British physicist. He is best known for his contributions to quantum information theory, quantum mechanics, and quantum entanglement. He earned his Bachelor of Science and Doctor of Philosophy degrees from Imperial College London, where he graduated with a PhD in 1998.

An active researcher, Vedral has over 500 published, regularly cited papers to his name. This output covers a broad range of topics within quantum physics, including quantum computing, quantum cryptography, and quantum thermodynamics. In recognition of his scholarly achievements, he was honoured with the Royal Society Wolfson Research Merit Award in 2007. Throughout his career, Vedral has held a number of academic positions, including lectureships and readership at Imperial College London, a professorship at the University of Leeds, and visiting professorships at institutions worldwide, including Vienna, Singapore, and Beijing. Since 2009, Vedral has served as Professor of Quantum Information Science in the Department of Physics at the University of Oxford. Additionally, he is a Governing Body Fellow of Wolfson College, Oxford.

In addition to his academic work, Vedral has made efforts to popularise and communicate complex scientific concepts to a broader audience. He frequently gives talks on quantum physics and its implications for society, as well as writing for mainstream journals and participating in vlogs, podcasts, and documentaries. Vedral has also written several textbooks and two popular science books, most notably Decoding Reality.

== Early years and education ==
Vedral was born in Belgrade, Serbia in 1971, the only son of two mathematics teachers. From a young age, he exhibited a keen interest in mathematics and philosophy. Vedral secured a place at the highly competitive Matematička gimnazija in Belgrade, renowned for its nurturing environment for gifted students in mathematics, physics, and informatics. It was during his time at this institution that Vedral's passion for physics was sparked, thanks to the tutelage of an inspirational teacher.

After completing his secondary education, Vedral fulfilled his national service obligations in the Yugoslav Army at the age of 19. He reached the rank of a lieutenant army reserve officer.

In 1991, seeking to further pursue his academic aspirations, he left Serbia for the United Kingdom. Awarded a scholarship from University of London, Vedral embarked on his undergraduate studies in theoretical physics at Imperial College London. In 1998, Vedral completed his PhD, examining the quantum information theory of entanglement, under the guidance and mentorship of Sir Peter Leonard Knight FRS HonFInstP. Vedral's doctoral research laid the groundwork for his future contributions to the field of quantum physics.

== Research and career ==
Following on from his PhD, Vedral was appointed Elsag-Bailey postdoctoral research fellow at Imperial College London in 1998, then he took on a research fellowship at Merton College, Oxford. In 2000, he returned to Imperial College London as the Governor’s lecturer to start a quantum information science research group. Alongside this, he took on a senior lecturer role at Keble College, Oxford. Both positions he held until 2004.

Prior to serving as the Centenary Professor of Quantum Information Science at the University of Leeds between 2004 and 2009, he was a Reader in Quantum Physics at Imperial College London. Between 2007 and 2022, Vedral was the principal investigator at the Centre for Quantum Technologies (CQT) in Singapore, and also professor of physics at the National University of Singapore (NUS). Vedral was a director of the Oxford Martin School initiative on bio-inspired quantum technologies from 2013 until 2017. This was an interdisciplinary consortium leading a group of 15 Oxford-based academics in the direction of quantum biomimetics.

Since 2009, Vedral has served as professor of quantum information science in the Department of Physics at the University of Oxford, concurrently holding the role of Governing Body Fellow of Wolfson College, Oxford.

=== Bibliography and publications ===
Vedral's publications can all be found on Google Scholar. His books include:

- 2005: Modern Foundations of Quantum Optics
- 2006: Introduction to Quantum Information Science
- 2010: Introductory Quantum Physics and Relativity
- 2010: Decoding Reality: The Universe as Quantum Information
- 2018: Solid State Quantum Information
- 2018: From Micro to Macro: Adventures of a Wandering Physicist
- 2025: Portals to a New Reality: Five Experiments to Unlock the Future of Physics

== Awards and honours ==
- The Abdus Salam Award (1997)
- Royal Society Wolfson Research Merit Award (2007)
- The World Scientific Physics Research Medal (2009)
- Recipient of Marko V. Jaric Award (2011)
- Elected a Fellow of the Institute of Physics (FInstP) (2017)
- Elected a member of The Academia Europaea, which known also as The Academy of Europe (2020)

== Visiting professorships ==
In addition to his academic positions in the UK, Vedral engaged in collaborative research and mentorship activities at the Perimeter Institute for Theoretical Physics in Canada in 2003, and from 2004 to 2005 he served as a visiting professor at the University of Vienna.

He also held a senior scientist position at the Schrödinger Institute in Vienna, and later served as a distinguished visiting professor at the University of Minas Gerais, Belo Horizonte, from 2009 to 2010. Vedral held a chair professorship at Tsinghua University in Beijing from 2015 to 2016, contributing to the institution's renowned research programs.

== Professional services ==
Vedral's dedication to advancing the field of quantum physics extends beyond his research contributions. As a respected authority in this field, Vedral has served as a referee for scientific journals, including Nature, and Nature related journals, Physical Review, and the Journal of Modern Optics.

In addition, Vedral has also served as a referee for grant proposals and research projects for organisations such as the Engineering and Physical Sciences Research Council (EPSRC), the Royal Society, and various international Science Foundations. He is a regular examiner for PhD theses and junior research fellowships.

Vedral has actively contributed to the organisation and coordination of scientific conferences and research networks. He has played a role in the organisation of five international conferences and two conferences in the UK, providing a platform for researchers to exchange ideas and collaborate on developments in quantum physics. Additionally, Vedral served as the coordinator of the (EPSRC)-funded UK network "Quantum Interference" from 2003 to 2006.

His commitment to shaping the future of quantum computing is reflected in his service on the council for The Future of Computing of the World Economic Forum since 2016. Moreover, he has contributed his insights to the Institute for Scientific Interchange in Turin as a consultant since 2017.

Through his involvement in professional services and leadership roles, Vedral has demonstrated his personal motivations to advance quantum physics, foster collaboration, and shape the future of scientific research.
