= Dragon Park Ha Long =

Amusement park in Vietnam

Dragon Park
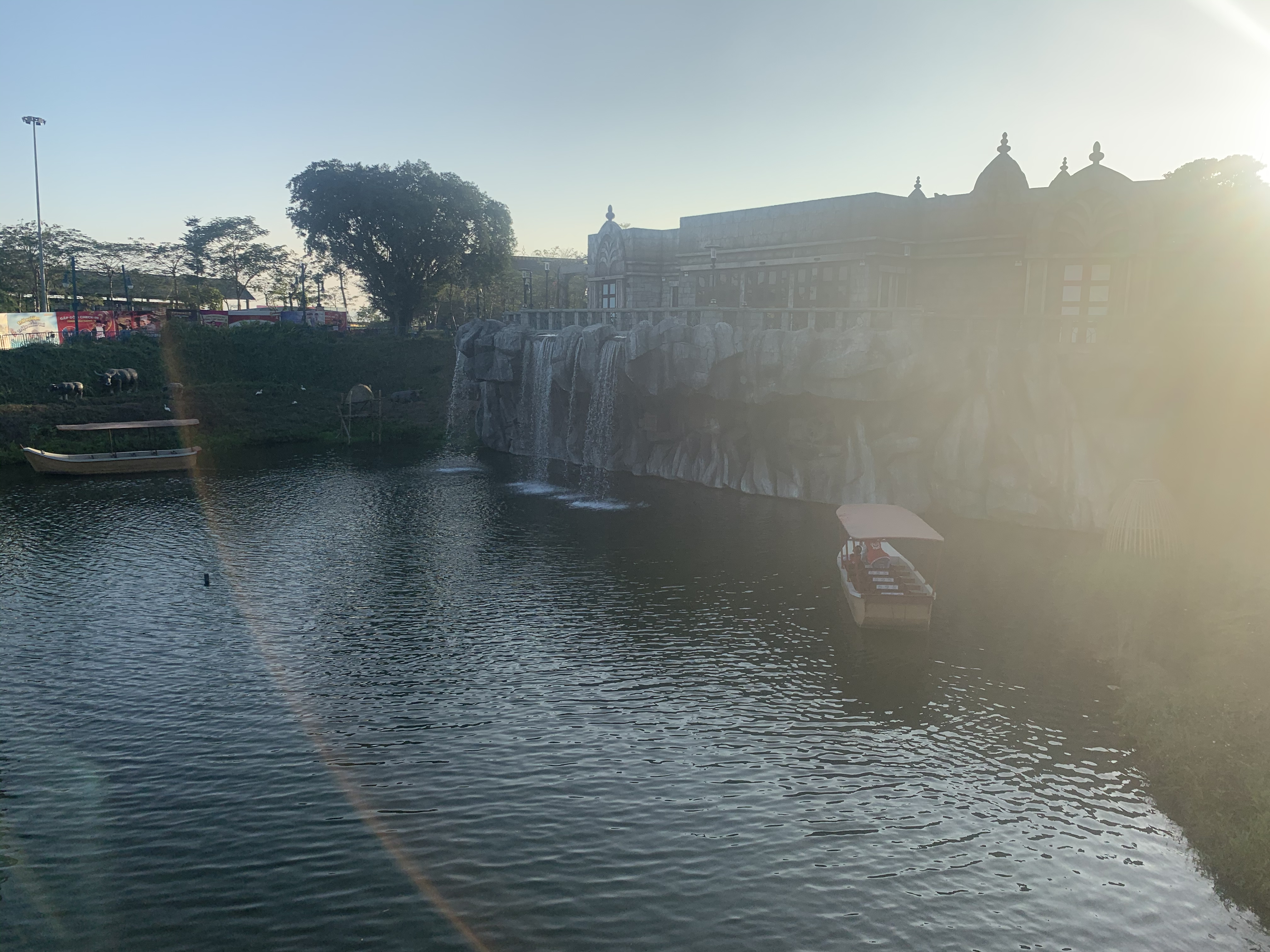
- Interactive map of Dragon Park
- Location: Ha Long, Quang Ninh, Vietnam
- Coordinates: 20.955479°N 107.049652°E
- Opened: January 25, 2017
- Owner: Sun Group
- Operated by: Parques Reunidos
- Area: Ha Long city of Quang Ninh province

Attractions
- Roller coasters: 3
- Website: http://www.sundragonpark.com/

Dragon Park is the largest theme park in Southeast Asia located in Ha Long, Quang Ninh, Vietnam. It opened on January 25, 2017. The amusement park is part of a large resort complex known as Sun World Halong Complex that includes an aerial tramway called the Queen Cable Car, Sun Wheel — a large observation wheel, as well as gardens, restaurants, a shopping district and a family entertainment center with arcade games. The Typhoon water park opened in April 2017. The park was designed in 2015 by International Theme Park Services, Inc. (Cincinnati, Ohio) in collaboration with Wyatt Design Group and Hetzel Design, both based in California.

== Ownership ==
Dragon Park, including the SunWorld HaLong resort, is owned by Sun Group, a Vietnamese investment group that was established in 2007 and specializes in hospitality, real estate development and construction.

== Roller coasters ==
Name	Type	Manufacturer	Model	Opened	Other statistics
Dragon's Run; Formerly Time Machine and Led Zeppelin: The Ride at Freestyle Music Park	Steel	Bolliger & Mabillard	Sitting Coaster	2017	Length: 3,738 ft (1,139 m); Height: 150 ft (46 m); Inversions: 6; Speed: 65 mph (105 km/h)
Mysterious Journey	Steel	Vekoma	Junior Coaster	2017	Length: 1,099.1 ft (335.0 m); Height: 42.7 ft (13.0 m); Speed: 28.5 mph (45.9 km/h)
Little Dragon's Flight	Steel	Vekoma	Suspended Family Coaster	2017	Length: 1,295.9 ft (395.0 m); Height: 64.3 ft (19.6 m); Speed: 34.2 mph (55.0 km/h)

== Attractions ==
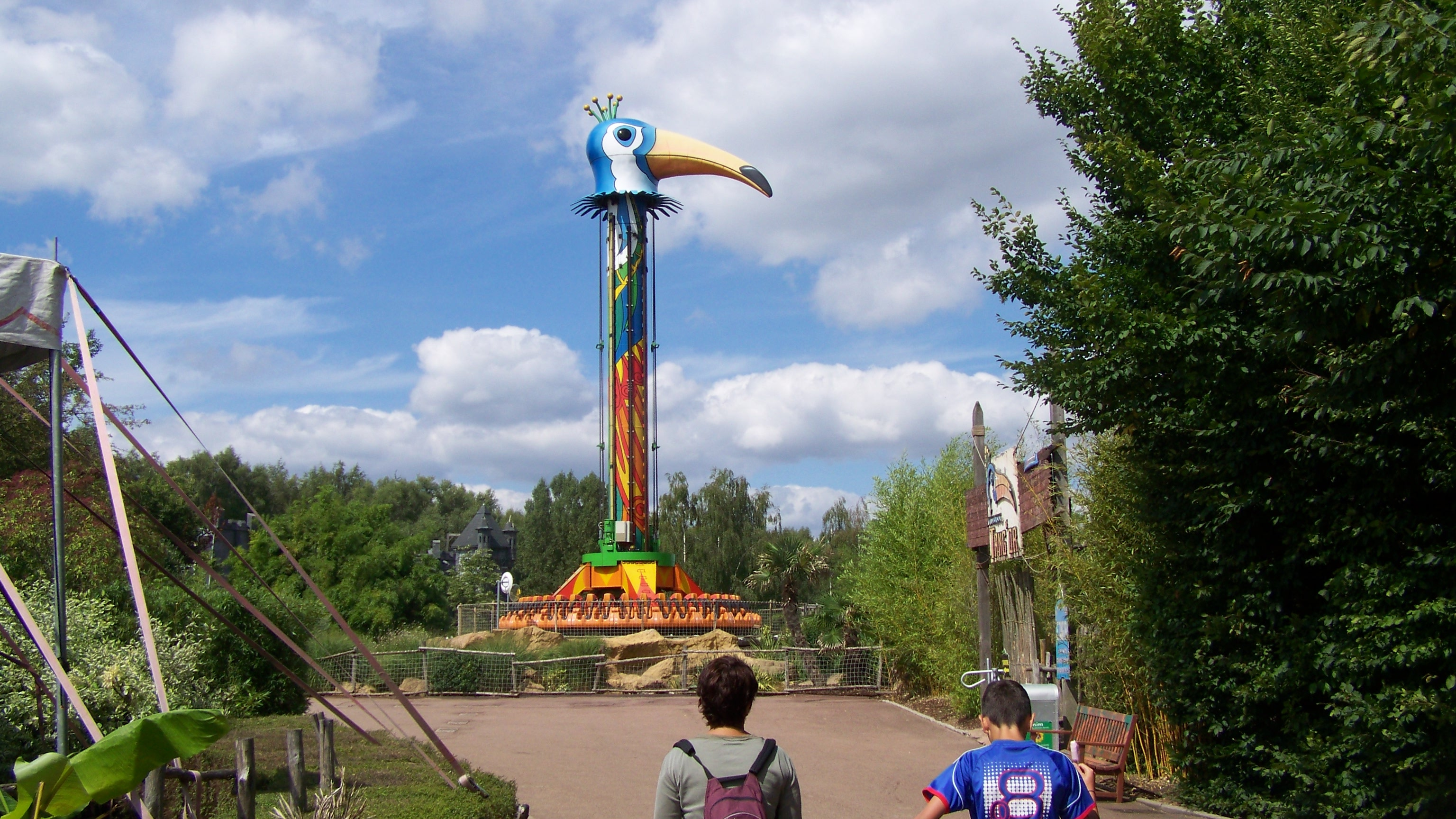
Crazy Crane, a Topple Tower from a French park, Walygator Parc

In addition to three roller coasters, the park has 29 rides including the drop tower, Rhino Sling; the Royal Carousel, Tow boat ride, Tea Cups, Little Dragon's Run, Circus Train and Garden Cruisers — a boat ride through tropical gardens. Coming from France, the Topple Tower Tang'Or moved to Dragon Park and is named Crazy Crane.
