= James Gleick =

American author and historian of science (born 1954)

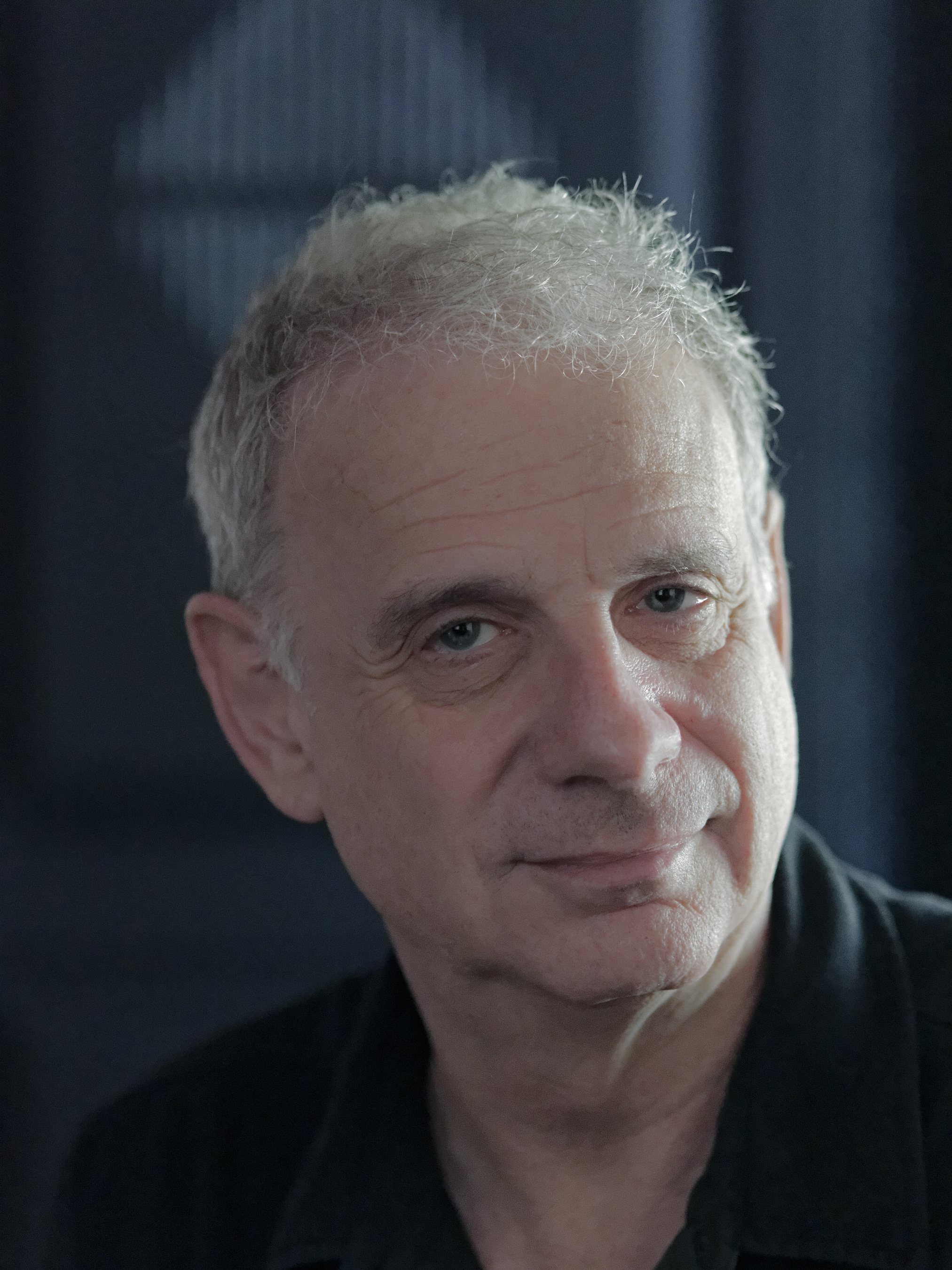
- Gleick in 2016
- Born: August 1, 1954 (age 72); New York City
- Education: Harvard University
- Occupation: Writer
- Relatives: Peter Gleick, brother
- Writing career
- Notable works: Chaos (1987); Genius (1992); The Information (2011)
- Website: around.com

James Gleick (/ɡlɪk/; born August 1, 1954) is an American author and historian of science whose work has chronicled the cultural impact of modern technology. Recognized for his writing about complex subjects through the techniques of narrative nonfiction, he has been called "one of the great science writers of all time". He is part of the inspiration for Jurassic Park character Ian Malcolm.

Gleick's books include the international bestsellers Chaos: Making a New Science (1987) and The Information: A History, a Theory, a Flood (2011). Three of his books have been Pulitzer Prize and National Book Award finalists; and The Information was awarded the PEN/E. O. Wilson Literary Science Writing Award and the Royal Society Winton Prize for Science Books in 2012. His books have been translated into more than thirty languages.

Per the Wall Street Journal, "Some writers excel at crafting a historical narrative, others at elucidating esoteric theories, still others at humanizing scientists. Mr. Gleick is a master of all these skills."

== Life ==
A native of New York City, Gleick attended Harvard College, where he was an editor of The Harvard Crimson, graduating in 1976 with an A.B. degree in English and linguistics.

=== Writing career ===
He moved to Minneapolis and helped found an alternative weekly newspaper, Metropolis. After its demise a year later, he returned to New York and in 1979 joined the staff of The New York Times. He worked there for ten years as an editor on the metropolitan desk and then as a science reporter. Among the scientists Gleick profiled in the New York Times Magazine were Douglas Hofstadter, Stephen Jay Gould, Mitchell Feigenbaum, and Benoit Mandelbrot. His early reporting on Microsoft anticipated the antitrust investigations by the U. S. Department of Justice and the European Commission.

He wrote the "Fast Forward" column in the New York Times Magazine from 1995 to 1999, and his essays charting the growth of the Internet formed the basis of his book What Just Happened. His work has also appeared in The New Yorker, The Atlantic, Slate, and The Washington Post, and he is a regular contributor to The New York Review of Books.

His first book, Chaos: Making a New Science, reported the development of the new science of chaos and complexity. It made the butterfly effect a household term, introduced the Mandelbrot set and fractal geometry to a broad audience, and sparked popular interest in the subject, influencing such diverse writers as Tom Stoppard (Arcadia) and Michael Crichton (Jurassic Park).

After the publication of Chaos, he collaborated with photographer Eliot Porter on Nature's Chaos and with developers at Autodesk on Chaos: The Software. His next books included two biographies, Genius: The Life and Science of Richard Feynman, and Isaac Newton. John Banville said the latter would "surely stand as the definitive study for a very long time to come."

Gleick's writing style has been described as a combination of "clear mind, magpie-styled research and explanatory verve." In 1989–90 he was the McGraw Distinguished Lecturer at Princeton University. In 2000 he was the first editor of The Best American Science Writing series. Gleick was elected president of the Authors Guild in 2017.

=== The Pipeline ===
As a reaction to poor user experience with procmail configuration at Panix, in 1993 Gleick founded The Pipeline, one of the earliest Internet service providers in New York City. The Pipeline was the first ISP to offer a graphical user interface, incorporating e-mail, chat, Usenet, and the World Wide Web, through software for Windows and Mac operating systems.

Gleick and business partner Uday Ivatury licensed the Pipeline software to other Internet service providers in the United States and overseas. In 1995 Gleick sold The Pipeline to PSINet, where it was later absorbed into MindSpring and then EarthLink.

=== Aircraft accident ===
On 20 December 1997 Gleick was attempting to land his Rutan Long-EZ experimental plane at Greenwood Lake Airport in West Milford, New Jersey, when a build-up of ice in the engine's carburetor caused the aircraft engine to lose power and the plane landed short of the runway into rising terrain. The impact killed Gleick's eight-year-old son, Harry, and left Gleick seriously injured.

== Bibliography ==
=== Books ===
Title	Year	ISBN	Publisher	Subject matter	Interviews and presentations	Comments
Chaos: Making a New Science	1987	ISBN 9780670811786	Viking Penguin	Chaos theory		Revised edition 2008, (ISBN 9780143113454)
Nature's Chaos	1989	ISBN 9780316609425	Viking Penguin			Written with Eliot Porter.
Genius: The Life and Science of Richard Feynman	1992	ISBN 9780679747048	Pantheon Books	Richard Feynman		
Faster: The Acceleration of Just About Everything	1999	ISBN 9780679775485	Pantheon Books		Presentation by Gleick on Faster, January 13, 2001, C-SPAN	
The Best American Science Writing 2000	2000	ISBN 9780060957360	HarperCollins		Panel discussion moderated by Gleick on The Best American Science Writing 2000, October 4, 2000	Editor
What Just Happened: A Chronicle from the Electronic Frontier	2002	ISBN 9780375713910	Pantheon Books		Presentation by Gleick on What Just Happened, August 21, 2002, C-SPAN	
Isaac Newton	2003	ISBN 9781400032952	Pantheon Books	Isaac Newton	Presentation by Gleick on Isaac Newton, June 12, 2003, C-SPAN	
The Information: A History, a Theory, a Flood	2011	ISBN 9780375423727	Pantheon Books		After Words interview with Gleick on The Information, June 18, 2011, C-SPAN	
Time Travel: A History	2016	ISBN 9780307908797	Pantheon Books	Time travel	Presentation by Gleick on Time Travel, October 15, 2016, C-SPAN; Presentation by Gleick on Time Travel, November 19, 2016, C-SPAN	
The Telephone: A New History	2026	ISBN 9780374618940	Farrar, Straus and Giroux	The telephone		

=== Articles ===
- James Gleick, "The Fate of Free Will" (review of Kevin J. Mitchell, Free Agents: How Evolution Gave Us Free Will, Princeton University Press, 2023, 333 pp.), The New York Review of Books, vol. LXXI, no. 1 (18 January 2024), pp. 27–28, 30. "Agency is what distinguishes us from machines. For biological creatures, reason and purpose come from acting in the world and experiencing the consequences. Artificial intelligences – disembodied, strangers to blood, sweat, and tears – have no occasion for that." (p. 30.)
- James Gleick, "The Prophet Business" (review of Glenn Adamson, A Century of Tomorrows: How Imagining the Future Shapes the Present, Bloomsbury, 2024, 336 pp.), The New York Review of Books, vol. LXXII, no. 3 (27 February 2025), pp. 6, 8, 10. "[Glenn] Adamson, having exposed... strains of failed futurology, suggests nonetheless that we... should continue to make our best guesses... always remembering that every prediction is a statement about the present... For... fourteen years, Wikipedia has included a[n] entry titled 'Timeline of the Far Future'... An editor responsible for one recent addition justified it with the comment, 'Adds a bit of hope.' A different editor deleted it a few seconds later." (p. 10.)
- James Gleick, "The Parrot in the Machine" (review of Emily M. Bender and Alex Hanna, The AI Con: How to Fight Big Tech's Hype and Create the Future We Want, Harper, 274 pp.; and James Boyle, The Line: AI and the Future of Personhood, MIT Press, 326 pp.), The New York Review of Books, vol. LXXII, no. 12 (24 July 2025), pp. 43–46.
- James Gleick, "How the Web Was Lost" (review of Tim Berners-Lee with Stephen Witt, This Is for Everyone: The Unfinished Story of the World Wide Web, Farrar, Straus and Giroux, 2025, 389 pp.; Joanna Walsh, Amateurs! How We Built Internet Culture, and Why It Matters, Verso, 2025, 262 pp.; and Cory Doctorow, Enshittification: Why Everything Suddenly Got Worse and What to Do About It, MCD, 338 pp.), The New York Review of Books, vol. LXXII, no. 19 (4 December 2025), pp. 6, 8, 10.
- James Gleick, "Talk to It" (review of Sherry Turkle, Artificial Intimacy: Who We Become When We Talk to Machines, Little, Brown, 2026, 262 pp.; and Sarah Ciston, David M. Berry, Anthony C. Hay, Mark C. Marino, Peter Millican, Arthur I. Schwarz, Jeff Shrager, and Peggy Weil, with a foreword by Janet H. Murray, Inventing ELIZA: How the First Chatbot Shaped the Future of AI, MIT Press, 2026, 339 pp.), The New York Review of Books, vol. LXXIII, no. 17 (5 November 2026), pp.34–36.
