= Charles Seife =

American author, journalist and professor

Charles Seife is an American author, journalist, and professor at New York University. He has written extensively on scientific and mathematical topics.

== Career ==
Seife holds a mathematics degree from Princeton University (1993), an M.S. in mathematics from Yale University and an M.S. in journalism from Columbia University.

Seife wrote for Science magazine and New Scientist before joining the Department of Journalism at New York University where he became a professor.

== Books ==
His first and best-known published book is Zero: The Biography of a Dangerous Idea (Viking, 2000).

In Proofiness: How You're Being Fooled By the Numbers (Penguin, 2010) Seife focuses on how much propaganda uses numbers worded in such a way that they confuse people and can be misinterpreted.

- Alpha & Omega: The Search for the Beginning and End of the Universe, Penguin Putnam, 2003. ISBN 0-670-03179-8
- Decoding the Universe, Penguin, 2007. ISBN 978-0-14-303839-9
- Seife, Charles (2008). Sun in a Bottle: The Strange History of Fusion and the Science of Wishful Thinking. Penguin. ISBN 9780670020331.
- Seife, Charles (2015-08-04). Virtual Unreality: The New Era of Digital Deception. Penguin. ISBN 9780143127673; pbk
- Seife, Charles (2021). Hawking Hawking: The Selling of a Scientific Celebrity. Basic Books. ISBN 978-1-5416-1837-4.
- Seife, Charles (2010). Proofiness: How You're Being Fooled by the Numbers. New York: Penguin. ISBN 978-0-14-312007-0.
- Seife, Charles (2000). Zero: The Biography of a Dangerous Idea. New York: Penguin Books. ISBN 9780140296471.

== Other writing ==
Seife's freelance work has appeared in The Philadelphia Inquirer, The Washington Post, The New York Times, Scientific American, and The Economist, among others. Throughout his career, he has written many book reviews, especially of books which focus on mathematics. Seife also wrote an essay which is currently featured in Rereading America: Cultural Contexts for Critical Thinking and Writing. His essay, “The Loneliness of The Interconnected,” focuses on how the internet may make its users more isolated.

== Professional associations ==
Seife is a member of PEN, the National Association of Science Writers, and the D.C. Science Writers Association.

== Awards ==
- 2001 PEN/Martha Albrand Award for First Nonfiction for Zero: The Biography of a Dangerous Idea
