= 2024–25 Austrian Football Bundesliga =

113th season of top-tier football in Austria

Austrian Bundesliga
- Season: 2024–25
- Dates: 2 August 2024 – 25 May 2025
- Champions: Sturm Graz (5th title)
- Relegated: Austria Klagenfurt
- Champions League: Sturm Graz; Salzburg
- Europa League: Wolfsberg
- Conference League: Austria Wien; Rapid Wien
- Top goalscorer: Ronivaldo (14 goals)
- Biggest home win: Sturm Graz 7–0 Austria Klagenfurt (23 November 2024)
- Biggest away win: LASK 1–5 Wolfsberg (1 September 2024)
- Highest scoring: Sturm Graz 7–0 Austria Klagenfurt (23 November 2024)
- Longest winning run: Austria Wien (8)
- Longest unbeaten run: RB Salzburg (12)
- Longest winless run: Altach (14)
- Longest losing run: LASK (5)
- Total attendance: 1,714,528
- Average attendance: 8,792

The 2024–25 Austrian Football Bundesliga, also known as Admiral Bundesliga for sponsorship reasons, was the 113th season of top-tier football in Austria. Sturm Graz successfully defended their championship. The season began on 2 August 2024 and concluded on 25 May 2025.

== Teams ==
SC Austria Lustenau were relegated to the 2024–25 Austrian Football Second League after finishing in last place in the 2023–24 Relegation Round, ending their two years stay in the top flight. Grazer AK was promoted as champions of the 2023–24 Austrian Football Second League, ending a seventeen-year hiatus from the top flight.

=== Stadia and locations ===
Location of teams in the 2024–25 Austrian Football Bundesliga

Team	Location	Venue	Capacity
Austria Klagenfurt	Klagenfurt	Wörthersee Stadion	29,863
Austria Wien	Vienna	Generali Arena	17,656
Blau-Weiß Linz	Linz	Hofmann Personal Stadion	5,595
Grazer AK	Graz	Merkur-Arena	16,364
LASK	Linz	Raiffeisen Arena	19,080
SK Rapid	Vienna	Allianz Stadion (Vienna)	28,600
Red Bull Salzburg	Wals-Siezenheim	Red Bull Arena	30,188
Rheindorf Altach	Altach	Stadion Schnabelholz	8,500
Sturm Graz	Graz	Merkur-Arena	16,364
TSV Hartberg	Hartberg	Profertil Arena Hartberg	4,635
Wolfsberger AC	Wolfsberg	Lavanttal-Arena	7,300
WSG Tirol	Innsbruck	Tivoli Stadion Tirol	16,008

=== Personnel and kits ===
Note: Flags indicate national team as has been defined under FIFA eligibility rules. Players may hold more than one non-FIFA nationality.

Team	Manager	Captain	Kit manufacturer	Shirt sponsors	
Team	Manager	Captain	Kit manufacturer	Main	Other(s)
Austria Klagenfurt	(Austria) Carsten Jancker	(Austria) Thorsten Mahrer	Capelli Sport	None	List: Front: Kärnten Sport, Stadtwerke Klagenfurt, Vivamayr, Kelag, Erlebnis Sportpark Klagenfurt; Back: Stadtwerke Klagenfurt; Sleeves: Hirter, Autohaus Sintschnig, Nissan; Shorts: Klagenfurt, REISSWOLF, Kleine Zeitung; Socks: None; Alternate: None
Austria Wien	(Austria) Stephan Helm	(Austria) Manfred Fischer	Macron	Frankstahl (H)/Steelcoin (A)	List: Front: Wien Holding; Back: Wien Holding; Sleeves: MTEL Austria, Wien Holding; Shorts: Schuller Eh'klar, Wien Holding, Marsbet; Socks: Wien Holding; Alternate: Steelcoin
Blau-Weiß Linz	(Austria) Gerald Scheiblehner	(Austria) Fabio Strauss	Uhlsport	Linz AG	List: Front: Linz, Linz AG; Back: Linz Airport; Sleeves: Personal Hofmann, Oberösterreichische Nachrichten, Linz AG; Shorts: Gasteiner Mineral Water, Autohaus Leeb in Wels; Socks: Liwest; Alternate: None
Grazer AK	(Austria) Ferdinand Feldhofer	(Austria) Marco Perchtold	Macron	Mapei	List: Front: Energie Steiermark, Grawe, Köck KFZ-Technik Meisterbetrieb; Back: Salanettis, Grapos Headquarter; Sleeves: bm-romar, Ziesler GmbH; Shorts: tim Austria, Kleine Zeitung, Energie Steiermark; Socks: Energie Graz; Alternate: Energie Steiermark
LASK	(Austria) Maximilian Ritscher (caretaker)	(Austria) Robert Zulj	Adidas	Backaldrin Kornspitz	List: Front: BWT, Oberösterreich, BWT Change the world - Sip by sip; Back: Energie AG, Zipfer; Sleeves: Raiffeisenlandesbank Oberösterreich, Aspöck; Shorts: Franz Oberndorfer GmbH, HYPO Oberösterreich, BWT, Nerobet; Socks: Molto Luce; Alternate: HYPO Oberösterreich
SK Rapid	(Austria) Stefan Kulovits (caretaker)	(Austria) Matthias Seidl	Puma	Wien Energie	List: Front: None; Back: spusu, Allianz; Sleeves: Raiffeisenlandesbank Oberösterreich; Shorts: Allianz, Wiener Zucker; Socks: easystaff; Alternate: foodaffairs
Red Bull Salzburg	(Germany) Thomas Letsch	(Germany) Janis Blaswich	Puma	Red Bull	List: Front: None; Back: Red Bull; Sleeves: Rauch; Shorts: None; Socks: None; Alternate: Rauch
Rheindorf Altach	(Austria) Fabio Ingolitsch	(Austria) Jan Zwischenbrugger	Jako	Cashpoint	List: Front: Gunz Warenhandels; Back: Markus Stolz GmbH, Waibel Workwear; Sleeves: Pfanner; Shorts: Vorarlberger Kraftwerke, Grand Casino Liechtenstein; Socks: Vorarlberger Nachrichten; Alternate: Gebrüder Weiss
Sturm Graz	(Austria) Jürgen Säumel	(Austria) Stefan Hierländer	Nike	Puntigamer	List: Front: Grawe, Puntigamer; Back: Puntigamer, Grapos Headquarter; Sleeves: Steirisches Kürbiskernöl; Shorts: tim Austria (H)/Graz (A), Kleine Zeitung, Energie Steiermark; Socks: Sieme Weingüter; Alternate: Energie Steiermark
TSV Hartberg	(Austria) Manfred Schmid	(Austria) Jürgen Heil	Adidas	Eggerglas	List: Front: ADMIRAL Sportwetten, PROFERTIL Sperm Booster, Kühlanlagen Postl, PROMACULA, Faustmann Möbel, KAPO Fenster und Türen, 11teamsports, Alois Schweighofer GmbH, Steiermark, Hartberg; Back: Hochegger Dächer, MOLIN Industrie, KE KELIT; Sleeves: Objekttischlerei Gleichweit, Menopearl; Shorts: Boxxenstop, Energie Hartberg, MM Kanal-Rohr-Sanierung, Energie Steiermark; Socks: Kühlanlagen Postl; Alternate: None
Wolfsberger AC	(Austria) Dietmar Kühbauer	(Austria) Dominik Baumgartner	Adidas	RZ Ökostrom	List: Front: Robitsch Obst und Gemüse, Kärnten Sport, 11teamsports, Radio Kärnten, velox.at, Kelag; Back: Salanettis; Sleeves: Velox Bau-Systeme, ADMIRAL; Shorts: Eskimo Eiszeit Kärnten, HERWA Multiclean Gebäudereinigung, Beschriftung Grafik Druck, Gigasport, Kleine Zeitung; Socks: BMW Gönitzer; Alternate: SBH Rohstoffhandels
WSG Tirol	(Austria) Philipp Semlic	(Austria) Valentino Müller	Puma	CATL	List: Front: Tiroler Tageszeitung, Tiroler Versicherung, Herz für den Tiroler Fussball; Back: Tirol; Sleeves: Tiroler Tageszeitung, Tiroler Wasserkraft, 11teamsports; Shorts: Fröschl Bau; Socks: Volksbank Tirol, Union Investment; Alternate: Tiroler Versicherung

=== Managerial changes ===
Team	Outgoing manager	Manner of departure	Date of vacancy	Position in the table	Incoming manager	Date of appointment	Ref.
Red Bull Salzburg	(Germany) Onur Çinel (caretaker)	End of caretaker spell	30 June 2024	Pre-season	(Netherlands) Pepijn Lijnders	1 July 2024	
Wolfsberger AC	(Austria) Manfred Schmid	Sacked	30 June 2024	Pre-season	(Austria) Dietmar Kühbauer	1 July 2024	
WSG Tirol	(Austria) Thomas Silberberger	Signed by Admira Wacker	30 June 2024	Pre-season	(Austria) Philipp Semlic	1 July 2024	
Austria Wien	(Austria) Christian Wegleitner (caretaker)	End of caretaker spell	30 June 2024	Pre-season	(Austria) Stephan Helm	1 July 2024	
LASK	(Austria) Thomas Darasz	Sacked	3 September 2024	11th	(Austria) Markus Schopp	3 September 2024	
TSV Hartberg	(Austria) Markus Schopp	Signed by LASK	3 September 2024	12th	(Austria) Markus Karner (caretaker)	3 September 2024	
TSV Hartberg	(Austria) Markus Karner (caretaker)	End of caretaker spell	22 September 2024	12th	(Austria) Manfred Schmid	22 September 2024	
SCR Altach	(Austria) Joachim Standfest	Sacked	30 September 2024	10th	(Austria) Fabio Ingolitsch	9 October 2024	
Grazer AK	(Austria) Gernot Messner	Sacked	21 October 2024	12th	(Austria) René Poms	22 October 2024	
Sturm Graz	(Austria) Christian Ilzer	Signed by Hoffenheim	15 November 2024	1st	(Austria) Jürgen Säumel	15 November 2024	
Red Bull Salzburg	(Netherlands) Pepijn Lijnders	Sacked	16 December 2024	5th	(Germany) Thomas Letsch	18 December 2024	
Grazer AK	(Austria) René Poms	Sacked	21 March 2025	11th	(Austria) Ferdinand Feldhofer	24 March 2025	
LASK	(Austria) Markus Schopp	Sacked	21 April 2025	7th	(Austria) Maximilian Ritscher (caretaker)	21 April 2025	
SK Rapid Wien	(Austria) Robert Klauß	Sacked	24 April 2025	5th	(Austria) Stefan Kulovits (caretaker)	24 April 2025	
Austria Klagenfurt	(Austria) Peter Pacult	Sacked	27 April 2025	11th	(Austria) Carsten Jancker	27 April 2025	

== Regular season ==
=== League table ===
Pos	Team	Pld	W	D	L	GF	GA	GD	Pts	Qualification
1	Sturm Graz	22	14	4	4	51	28	+23	46	Qualification for the Championship round
2	Austria Wien	22	14	4	4	36	19	+17	46	Qualification for the Championship round
3	Red Bull Salzburg	22	10	8	4	33	22	+11	38	Qualification for the Championship round
4	Wolfsberg	22	11	3	8	44	30	+14	36	Qualification for the Championship round
5	Rapid Wien	22	9	7	6	32	24	+8	34	Qualification for the Championship round
6	Blau-Weiß Linz	22	10	3	9	30	29	+1	33	Qualification for the Championship round
7	LASK	22	9	4	9	32	33	−1	31	Qualification for the Relegation round
8	TSV Hartberg	22	6	8	8	24	31	−7	26	Qualification for the Relegation round
9	Austria Klagenfurt	22	5	6	11	22	44	−22	21	Qualification for the Relegation round
10	WSG Tirol	22	4	7	11	20	31	−11	19	Qualification for the Relegation round
11	Grazer AK	22	3	7	12	27	45	−18	16	Qualification for the Relegation round
12	Rheindorf Altach	22	3	7	12	20	35	−15	16	Qualification for the Relegation round

Source: Austrian Football Bundesliga
Rules for classification: 1) Points; 2) Head-to-head record; 3) Goal difference; 4) Goals scored; 5) Matches won; 6) Away matches won; 7) Away goals scored.

=== Results ===
Home \ Away	AKL	AWI	BWL	GAK	HAR	LSK	RWI	RBS	ALT	STU	TIR	WAC
Austria Klagenfurt	—	0–1	3–1	4–2	2–2	1–2	1–1	0–0	2–2	0–2	0–3	2–1
Austria Wien	2–0	—	2–1	2–1	1–0	2–1	2–1	0–1	3–0	2–2	3–0	3–1
Blau-Weiß Linz	2–1	1–0	—	1–2	4–1	1–0	3–0	2–0	1–3	1–2	2–1	0–1
Grazer AK	0–1	1–2	2–2	—	0–3	0–0	1–1	2–3	1–1	1–2	2–1	2–3
Hartberg	1–1	1–1	2–1	1–1	—	1–2	2–1	1–1	2–0	1–2	1–0	0–3
LASK	4–0	1–3	0–0	4–2	1–1	—	2–1	0–1	1–2	1–2	2–1	1–5
Rapid Wien	2–0	2–1	0–1	3–0	2–1	1–1	—	3–2	5–0	1–0	2–0	1–3
Red Bull Salzburg	3–0	2–0	5–1	0–0	4–0	1–2	2–2	—	2–1	3–1	1–1	1–0
Rheindorf Altach	2–2	1–1	0–1	1–2	0–0	1–2	0–1	1–1	—	1–1	1–2	2–0
Sturm Graz	7–0	2–2	2–1	5–2	2–0	4–2	1–1	5–0	2–1	—	4–2	0–3
WSG Tirol	0–1	0–2	1–1	0–0	0–0	1–2	0–0	0–0	1–0	0–3	—	3–3
Wolfsberg	4–1	0–1	1–2	4–2	2–3	2–1	1–1	0–0	2–0	3–0	1–3	—

Source: Austrian Football Bundesliga
Legend: Blue = home team win; Yellow = draw; Red = away team win.

== Championship round ==
The points obtained during the regular season were halved (and rounded down) before the start of the playoff. As a result, the teams started with the following points before the playoff: Sturm Graz 23, Austria Wien 23, Red Bull Salzburg 19, Wolfsberger 18, Rapid Wien 17, and Blau-Weiß Linz 16. The points of Blau-Weiß Linz were rounded down – in the event of any ties on points at the end of the playoffs, a half point would be added for them.

Pos	Team	Pld	W	D	L	GF	GA	GD	Pts	Qualification	STU	RBS	AWI	WAC	RWI	BWL
1	Sturm Graz (C)	32	19	6	7	66	39	+27	40	Qualification for the Champions League play-off round	—	4–2	0–1	1–1	2–0	2–0
2	Red Bull Salzburg	32	16	9	7	53	36	+17	38	Qualification for the Champions League second qualifying round	1–2	—	2–0	1–1	4–2	2–1
3	Austria Wien	32	18	6	8	47	32	+15	37	Qualification for the Conference League second qualifying round	2–1	1–3	—	0–0	1–2	2–2
4	Wolfsberg	32	16	7	9	60	38	+22	37	Qualification for the Europa League third qualifying round (Note: Wolfsberg qualified for the Europa League third qualifying round as the 2024–25 Austrian Cup winners.)	1–1	2–1	1–2	—	5–1	2–0
5	Rapid Wien (O)	32	12	8	12	43	42	+1	27	Qualification for the Conference League play-offs	3–1	0–2	2–0	0–1	—	0–0
6	Blau-Weiß Linz	32	11	5	16	37	45	−8	21		0–1	1–2	0–2	1–2	2–1	—

Source: Austrian Football Bundesliga
Legend: Blue = home team win; Yellow = draw; Red = away team win.
Rules for classification: 1) Points; 2) Points with (possible) half points subtracted due to rounding; 3) Head-to-head points; 4) Head-to-head goal difference; 5) Head-to-head goals scored; 6) Goal difference; 7) Goals scored; 8) Matches won; 9) Away matches won; 10) Away goals scored.
(C) Champions; (O) Play-off winners

== Relegation round ==
The points obtained during the regular season were halved (and rounded down) before the start of the playoff. As a result, the teams started with the following points before the playoff: LASK 15, TSV Hartberg 13, Austria Klagenfurt 10, WSG Tirol 9, Grazer AK 8, and Rheindorf Altach 8. The points of LASK, Austria Klagenfurt, and WSG Tirol were rounded down – in the event of any ties on points at the end of the playoffs, a half point would be added for those teams.

Pos	Team	Pld	W	D	L	GF	GA	GD	Pts	Qualification	LSK	HAR	TIR	GAK	ALT	AKL
1	LASK	32	16	6	10	51	36	+15	38	Qualification for the Conference League play-offs	—	0–0	2–0	1–0	0–0	6–0
2	TSV Hartberg	32	11	11	10	40	40	0	31	Qualification for the Conference League play-offs	0–1	—	3–2	1–1	2–0	2–3
3	WSG Tirol	32	7	9	16	35	50	−15	20		1–3	1–3	—	1–1	1–0	5–3
4	Grazer AK	32	5	13	14	34	54	−20	20		1–0	0–3	0–0	—	1–0	1–1
5	Rheindorf Altach	32	5	11	16	29	46	−17	18		0–2	1–1	3–0	2–2	—	0–0
6	Austria Klagenfurt (R)	32	6	9	17	33	70	−37	16	Relegation to Austrian Football Second League	1–4	0–1	1–4	0–0	2–3	—

Source: Austrian Football Bundesliga
Legend: Blue = home team win; Yellow = draw; Red = away team win.
Rules for classification: 1) Points; 2) Points with (possible) half points subtracted due to rounding; 3) Head-to-head points; 4) Head-to-head goal difference; 5) Head-to-head goals scored; 6) Goal difference; 7) Goals scored; 8) Matches won; 9) Away matches won; 10) Away goals scored.
(R) Relegated

== Conference League play-offs ==
The winner and runner-up of the relegation round and the fifth-placed team from the championship round played to determine the qualifier to the Conference League second qualifying round.

Semi-final			Final
			7	LASK	3	0	3
7	LASK	2	5	Rapid Wien	1	3	4
8	Hartberg	0

=== Semi-final ===
26 May 2025	LASK	2–0	Hartberg	Linz
19:00 CEST (UTC+2)	Entrup 21'; Andrade 64'	Report		Stadium: Raiffeisen Arena; Attendance: 8,100; Referee: Julian Weinberger

=== Final ===
29 May 2025	LASK	3–1	Rapid Wien	Linz
17:00 CEST (UTC+2)	Žulj 5', 90+1'; Coulibaly 66'	Report	Seidl 26' (pen.)	Stadium: Raiffeisen Arena; Attendance: 13,200; Referee: Alexander Harkam

1 June 2025	Rapid Wien	3–0 (4–3 agg.)	LASK	Vienna
17:00 CEST (UTC+2)	Burgstaller 31'; Seidl 81' (pen.); Kara 90+5'	Report		Stadium: Allianz Stadion; Attendance: 18,125; Referee: Christopher Jäeger

== Statistics ==
=== Top scorers ===
Rank	Player	Club	Goals
1	(Austria) Ronivaldo	Blau-Weiß Linz	14
2	(Austria) Maximilian Entrup	LASK	13
2	(Mali) Dorgeles Nene	Red Bull Salzburg	13
4	(Austria) Dominik Fitz	Austria Wien	12
4	(Georgia (country)) Otar Kiteishvili	Sturm Graz	12
4	(Croatia) Patrik Mijić	Hartberg	12
7	(Denmark) Mika Biereth	Sturm Graz	11
7	(Denmark) William Bøving	Sturm Graz	11
7	(Germany) Maurice Malone	Austria Wien	11

== Awards ==
=== Annual awards ===
Award	Winner	Club
Player of the Season	(Georgia (country)) Otar Kiteishvili	Sturm Graz
Goalkeeper of the Season	(Netherlands) Kjell Scherpen	Sturm Graz
Newcomer of the Season	(Mali) Malick Junior Yalcouyé	Sturm Graz
Coach of the Season	(Austria) Dietmar Kühbauer	Wolfsberger AC

=== Team of the Year ===

Team of the Year
Goalkeeper	(Netherlands) Kjell Scherpen (Sturm Graz)				
Defence	(France) Serge-Philippe Raux- Yao (Rapid Wien)	Aleksandar Dragović (Austria Wien)		(Nigeria) Chibuike Nwaiwu (Wolfsberger AC)	
Midfield	(Israel) Oscar Gloukh (Red Bull Salzburg)	(Mali) Malick Junior Yalcouyé (Sturm Graz)	(Georgia (country)) Otar Kiteishvili (Sturm Graz)	Dominik Fitz (Austria Wien)	(Croatia) Dejan Zukić (Wolfsberger AC)
Attack	(Brazil) Ronivaldo (Blau-Weiß Linz)			(Denmark) William Bøving (Sturm Graz)	

== Attendances ==
Rank	Club	Average
1	SK Rapid Wien	19,973
2	SK Sturm Graz	15,267
3	FK Austria Wien	13,141
4	LASK Linz	12,115
5	FC RB Salzburg	12,069
6	Grazer AK	8,175
7	FC Blau-Weiss Linz	5,354
8	SC Rheindorf Altach	5,021
9	SK Austria Klagenfurt	4,384
10	Wolfsberger AC	4,219
11	TSV Hartberg Fussball	2,942
12	WSG Tirol	2,039

== See also ==
- 2024–25 Austrian Football Second League
- 2024–25 Austrian Cup
