= 2026–27 Austrian Football Bundesliga =

Austrian Bundesliga
- Season: 2026–27
- Dates: 1 August 2026 – 17 May 2027
- All statistics correct as of 26 June 2026.

The 2026–27 Austrian Football Bundesliga will be the 115th season of top-tier football in Austria. LASK will enter the season as defending champion having won their second title the previous year. The season begins on 1 August 2026 and will end on 17 May 2027. From this year for the first time since 2018–19, the points after the regular season will not be halved and will be carried over in full into the championship or relegation round.

== Teams ==
Blau-Weiß Linz were relegated to the 2026–27 Austrian Football Second League after finishing in last place in the 2025–26 Relegation Round, ending their three-year run in the top flight.

Austria Lustenau was promoted as champions of the 2025–26 Austrian Football Second League, returning just two years after their relegation.

=== Stadia and locations ===
Location of teams in the 2026–27 Austrian Football Bundesliga

Team	Location	Venue	Capacity
Austria Lustenau	Lustenau	Sun Minimeal Arena	5,138
Austria Wien	Vienna	Generali Arena	17,656
Grazer AK	Graz	Merkur-Arena	16,364
LASK	Linz	Raiffeisen Arena	19,080
SK Rapid	Vienna	Allianz Stadion (Vienna)	28,600
Red Bull Salzburg	Wals-Siezenheim	Red Bull Arena	30,188
Rheindorf Altach	Altach	Stadion Schnabelholz	8,500
SV Ried	Ried im Innkreis	Keine Sorgen Arena	7,680
Sturm Graz	Graz	Merkur-Arena	16,364
TSV Hartberg	Hartberg	Profertil Arena Hartberg	5,024
Wolfsberger AC	Wolfsberg	Lavanttal-Arena	7,300
WSG Tirol	Innsbruck	Tivoli Stadion Tirol	16,008

=== Personnel and kits ===
Note: Flags indicate national team as has been defined under FIFA eligibility rules. Players may hold more than one non-FIFA nationality.

Team	Manager	Captain	Kit manufacturer	Shirt sponsors	
Team	Manager	Captain	Kit manufacturer	Main	Other(s)
Austria Lustenau	(Austria) Markus Mader	(Austria) Matthias Maak	Uhlsport	Neoh	List: Front: Linz, Linz AG; Back: Linz Airport; Sleeves: Personal Hofmann, Oberösterreichische Nachrichten, Linz AG; Shorts: Gasteiner Mineral Water, Autohaus Leeb in Wels; Socks: Liwest; Alternate: None
Austria Wien	(Austria) Stephan Helm	(Austria) Manfred Fischer	Macron	Frankstahl (H)/Steelcoin (A)	List: Front: Wien Holding; Back: Wien Holding; Sleeves: MTEL Austria, Wien Holding; Shorts: Schuller Eh'klar, Wien Holding, Marsbet; Socks: Wien Holding; Alternate: Steelcoin
Grazer AK	(Austria) Gerald Scheiblehner	(Austria) Daniel Maderner	Macron	Mapei	List: Front: Energie Steiermark, Grawe, Köck KFZ-Technik Meisterbetrieb; Back: Salanettis, Grapos Headquarter; Sleeves: bm-romar, Ziesler GmbH; Shorts: tim Austria, Kleine Zeitung, Energie Steiermark; Socks: Energie Graz; Alternate: Energie Steiermark
LASK	(Austria) Dietmar Kühbauer	(Austria) Sascha Horvath	Adidas	Backaldrin Kornspitz	List: Front: BWT, Oberösterreich, BWT Change the world - Sip by sip; Back: Energie AG, Zipfer; Sleeves: Raiffeisenlandesbank Oberösterreich, Aspöck; Shorts: Franz Oberndorfer GmbH, HYPO Oberösterreich, BWT, Nerobet; Socks: Molto Luce; Alternate: HYPO Oberösterreich
Rapid Wien	(Denmark) Johannes Hoff Thorup	(Austria) Matthias Seidl	Mizuno	Wien Energie	List: Front: None; Back: spusu, Allianz; Sleeves: Raiffeisenlandesbank Oberösterreich; Shorts: Allianz, Wiener Zucker; Socks: easystaff; Alternate: foodaffairs
Red Bull Salzburg	(Germany) Danny Röhl	(Austria) Nikolas Veratschnig	Puma	Red Bull	List: Front: None; Back: Red Bull; Sleeves: Rauch; Shorts: None; Socks: None; Alternate: Rauch
Rheindorf Altach	(Serbia) Ognjen Zaric	(Austria) Lukas Jäger	Jako	Cashpoint	List: Front: Gunz Warenhandels; Back: Markus Stolz GmbH, Waibel Workwear; Sleeves: Pfanner; Shorts: Vorarlberger Kraftwerke, Grand Casino Liechtenstein; Socks: Vorarlberger Nachrichten; Alternate: Gebrüder Weiss
SV Ried	(Croatia) Mario Despotović	(Austria) Andreas Leitner	Hummel	Oberbank	List: Front: Back: Sleeves: Shorts: Socks: Alternate:
Sturm Graz	(Austria) Fabio Ingolitsch	(Slovenia) Jon Gorenc Stanković	Nike	Puntigamer	List: Front: Grawe, Puntigamer; Back: Puntigamer, Grapos Headquarter; Sleeves: Steirisches Kürbiskernöl; Shorts: tim Austria (H)/Graz (A), Kleine Zeitung, Energie Steiermark; Socks: Sieme Weingüter; Alternate: Energie Steiermark
TSV Hartberg	(Austria) Markus Schopp	(Austria) Tobias Kainz	Adidas	Eggerglas	List: Front: ADMIRAL Sportwetten, PROFERTIL Sperm Booster, Kühlanlagen Postl, PROMACULA, Faustmann Möbel, KAPO Fenster und Türen, 11teamsports, Alois Schweighofer GmbH, Steiermark, Hartberg; Back: Hochegger Dächer, MOLIN Industrie, KE KELIT; Sleeves: Objekttischlerei Gleichweit, Menopearl; Shorts: Boxxenstop, Energie Hartberg, MM Kanal-Rohr-Sanierung, Energie Steiermark; Socks: Kühlanlagen Postl; Alternate: None
Wolfsberger AC	(Austria) Thomas Silberberger	(Austria) Nicolas Wimmer	Adidas	RZ Ökostrom	List: Front: Robitsch Obst und Gemüse, Kärnten Sport, 11teamsports, Radio Kärnten, velox.at, Kelag; Back: Salanettis; Sleeves: Velox Bau-Systeme, ADMIRAL; Shorts: Eskimo Eiszeit Kärnten, HERWA Multiclean Gebäudereinigung, Beschriftung Grafik Druck, Gigasport, Kleine Zeitung; Socks: BMW Gönitzer; Alternate: SBH Rohstoffhandels
WSG Tirol	(Austria) Philipp Semlic	(Austria) Lukas Hinterseer	Puma	CATL	List: Front: Tiroler Tageszeitung, Tiroler Versicherung, Herz für den Tiroler Fussball; Back: Tirol; Sleeves: Tiroler Tageszeitung, Tiroler Wasserkraft, 11teamsports; Shorts: Fröschl Bau; Socks: Volksbank Tirol, Union Investment; Alternate: Tiroler Versicherung

=== Managerial changes ===
Team	Outgoing manager	Manner of departure	Date of vacancy	Position in the table	Incoming manager	Date of appointment	Ref.
TSV Hartberg	(Austria) Manfred Schmid	End of contract	18 May 2026	Pre-season	(Austria) Markus Schopp	20 May 2026	
Red Bull Salzburg	(Austria) Daniel Beichler	Sacked	18 May 2026	Pre-season	(Germany) Danny Röhl	17 June 2026	
SV Ried	(Austria) Maximilian Senft	Signed by Karlsruher SC	15 June 2026	Pre-season	(Croatia) Mario Despotović	15 June 2026	
Grazer AK	(Austria) Ferdinand Feldhofer	Sacked	17 August 2026	9th	(Austria) Joachim Standfest (interim)	17 August 2026	
Grazer AK	(Austria) Joachim Standfest	End of interim spell	24 August 2026	10th	(Austria) Gerald Scheiblehner	24 August 2026	

== Regular season ==
=== League table ===
Pos	Team	Pld	W	D	L	GF	GA	GD	Pts	Qualification
1	SK Rapid	13	12	0	1	42	9	+33	36	Qualification for the Championship round
2	Red Bull Salzburg	13	9	3	1	33	10	+23	30	Qualification for the Championship round
3	LASK	13	9	1	3	32	16	+16	28	Qualification for the Championship round
4	TSV Hartberg	13	6	2	5	24	21	+3	20	Qualification for the Championship round
5	Sturm Graz	13	5	4	4	22	18	+4	19	Qualification for the Championship round
6	SV Ried	13	5	4	4	23	23	0	19	Qualification for the Championship round
7	Austria Lustenau	13	4	2	7	16	30	−14	14	Qualification for the Relegation round
8	SCR Altach	13	4	1	8	12	20	−8	13	Qualification for the Relegation round
9	WSG Tirol	13	3	4	6	15	19	−4	13	Qualification for the Relegation round
10	Austria Wien	13	3	2	8	12	23	−11	11	Qualification for the Relegation round
11	Grazer AK	13	2	4	7	9	32	−23	10	Qualification for the Relegation round
12	Wolfsberger	13	1	3	9	9	28	−19	6	Qualification for the Relegation round

Updated to match(es) played on 22 November 2026. Source: Austrian Football Bundesliga
Rules for classification: 1) Points; 2) Head-to-head record; 3) Goal difference; 4) Goals scored; 5) Matches won; 6) Away matches won; 7) Away goals scored.

=== Results ===
Home \ Away	ALU	AWI	GAK	HAR	LSK	RWI	RBS	ALT	RIE	STU	TIR	WAC
Austria Lustenau	—		2–0	11 Dec	0–4	28 Nov		19 Sep	1–1		0–4	2–1
Austria Wien	2–1	—			0–2	0–2	1–0			0–2	0–1	28 Nov
Grazer AK	2–1	19 Sep	—	0–4		0–3	0–0	27 Nov		13 Dec		0–0
Hartberg	4–3	0–2	5 Dec	—	3–3			3–0	3–2	0–2		1–0
LASK		13 Dec	3–0	2–1	—	0–2	1–3	3–0	4–1		2–1	
SK Rapid	5–1	a	8–0	3–1	5 Dec	—		1–0	12 Dec	3–1	3–0	6–0
Red Bull Salzburg	5–1	4–1		1–0	29 Nov	5–1	—	18 Oct		3–0		13 Dec
SCR Altach		2–1	1–2	1–2			4 Dec	—	1–1	1–0	3–1	3–0
SV Ried		3–2	1–0	29 Nov	2–4	1–2	1–1		—		6 Dec	4–1
Sturm Graz	1–1	6 Dec	18 Oct		2–1		3–4	1–0	2–2	—	29 Nov	
WSG Tirol	0–1	1–1	1–1	2–2			0–3	12 Dec	1–2	1–1	—	
Wolfsberg	6 Dec	3–0			1–3	0–3	1–1		1–2	1–1	18 Oct	—

Updated to match(es) played on 22 November 2026. Source: Austrian Football Bundesliga
Legend: Blue = home team win; Yellow = draw; Red = away team win.

== Statistics ==
=== Top scorers ===
Rank	Player	Club	Goals
1	(United States) Samuel Adeniran	LASK	4
1	(Denmark) Tonni Adamsen	Rapid Wien	4
1	(Albania) Giacomo Vrioni	Wolfsberg	4
4	12 players		2

== See also ==
- 2026–27 Austrian Football Second League
- 2026–27 Austrian Cup
