= 2023–24 Austrian Football Bundesliga =

112th season of top-tier football in Austria

Austrian Bundesliga
- Season: 2023–24
- Dates: 28 July 2023 – 28 May 2024
- Champions: Sturm Graz (4th title)
- Relegated: Austria Lustenau
- Champions League: Sturm Graz; Red Bull Salzburg
- Europa League: SK Rapid; LASK
- Conference League: Austria Wien
- Matches: 192
- Goals: 496 (2.58 per match)
- Top goalscorer: Karim Konaté (20 goals)
- Biggest home win: Red Bull Salzburg 7–0 Austria Lustenau
- Biggest away win: Blau-Weiß Linz 0–5 SK Rapid; Austria Lustenau 0–5 SK Rapid
- Highest scoring: Red Bull Salzburg 7–0 Austria Lustenau
- Longest winning run: 6 games Red Bull Salzburg
- Longest unbeaten run: 14 games Red Bull Salzburg
- Longest winless run: 17 games Austria Lustenau
- Longest losing run: 7 games Austria Lustenau
- Highest attendance: 26,000; Rapid Wien 3–0 Austria Wien (25 February 2024)
- Lowest attendance: 623; Austria Klagenfurt 1–1 Hartberg (4 December 2023)
- Total attendance: 1,581,837
- Average attendance: 8,111

The 2023–24 Austrian Football Bundesliga, also known as Admiral Bundesliga for sponsorship reasons, was the 112th season of top-tier football in Austria. Red Bull Salzburg were the ten-times defending champions. The season began on 28 July 2023 and concluded on 28 May 2024. Sturm Graz won their fourth Bundesliga title and first since 2011, ending Salzburg's ten-year streak.

== Teams ==
=== Changes ===
SV Guntamatic Ried were relegated to the 2023–24 Austrian Football Second League after finishing in last place in the 2022–23 Relegation Round, ending their three years stay in the top flight. Blau-Weiß Linz promoted for the first time in history from this season, as champions of the 2022–23 Austrian Football Second League.

=== Stadia and locations ===
Location of teams in the 2023–24 Austrian Football Bundesliga

Team	Location	Venue	Capacity
Austria Klagenfurt	Klagenfurt	Wörthersee Stadion	29,863
Austria Lustenau	Lustenau	Reichshofstadion	5,138
Austria Wien	Vienna	Generali Arena	17,656
Blau-Weiß Linz	Linz	Hofmann Personal Stadion	5,595
LASK	Linz	Raiffeisen Arena	19,080
SK Rapid	Vienna	Allianz Stadion	28,000
Red Bull Salzburg	Wals-Siezenheim	Red Bull Arena	17,218 (30,188) (Note: Upper stand remains closed during league matches.)
Rheindorf Altach	Altach	Stadion Schnabelholz	8,500
Sturm Graz	Graz	Merkur-Arena	16,364
TSV Hartberg	Hartberg	Profertil Arena Hartberg	4,635
Wolfsberger AC	Wolfsberg	Lavanttal-Arena	7,300
WSG Tirol	Innsbruck	Tivoli Stadion Tirol	16,008

=== Personnel and kits ===
Note: Flags indicate national team as has been defined under FIFA eligibility rules. Players may hold more than one non-FIFA nationality.

Team	Manager	Captain	Kit manufacturer	Shirt sponsors (front)	Shirt sponsors (back)	Shirt sponsors (sleeve)	Shorts sponsor	Socks sponsor	Alternative shirt sponsor
Austria Klagenfurt	(Austria) Peter Pacult	(Austria) Thorsten Mahrer	Capelli Sport	Das Wien-Das Kärnten Gratiszeitung, Stadtwerke Klagenfurt, Kelag, Kärnten Sport, Vivamayr	Stadtwerke Klagenfurt	Hirter, Autohaus Sintschnig, Nissan	Klagenfurt, Hirter, Kleine Zeitung	None	None
Austria Lustenau	(Austria) Andreas Heraf	(Austria) Matthias Maak	Uhlsport	Union Investment, Hervis Sports, 11teamsports	Vorarlberger Kraftwerke, Jäger-Aquatec	Lech Zürs am Arlberg	Vorarlberger Kraftwerke, Mohrenbräu, Vorarlberger Nachrichten, Privis	None	Mohrenbräu
Austria Wien	(Germany) Michael Wimmer	(Austria) Manfred Fischer	Nike	Frankstahl, Wien Holding	Assicurazioni Generali	Wien Holding	Schuller Eh'klar, Wien Holding, Marsbet	Wien Holding	Steelcoin
Blau-Weiß Linz	(Austria) Gerald Scheiblehner	(Austria) Michael Brandner	Uhlsport	Linz AG, Linz	Linz Airport	Personal Hofmann, Oberösterreichische Nachrichten	None	Liwest	No alternate sponsor
LASK	(Austria) Thomas Darazs	(Austria) Robert Zulj	BWT	Backaldrin Kornspitz, Oberösterreich, BWT Change the world - Sip by sip	Energie AG, Zipfer	Raiffeisenlandesbank Oberösterreich	Franz Oberdorfer GmbH, HYPO Oberösterreich, BWT, SAR Anlagenbau	Molto Luce	HYPO Oberösterreich
SK Rapid	(Germany) Robert Klauß	(Austria) Guido Burgstaller	Puma	Wien Energie	spusu, Allianz	None	Wiener Zucker, Allianz	Easystaff	foodaffairs
Red Bull Salzburg	(Germany) Onur Çinel (caretaker)	(Austria) Andreas Ulmer	Nike	Red Bull	None	Rauch	None	None	Rauch
Rheindorf Altach	(Austria) Joachim Standfest	(Austria) Jan Zwischenbrugger	Jako	Cashpoint, Gunz Warenhandels	Markus Stolz GmbH, Waibel Workwear	Pfanner	Vorarlberger Kraftwerke, Fohrenburger	Vorarlberger Nachrichten	Gebrüder Weiss
Sturm Graz	(Austria) Christian Ilzer	(Austria) Stefan Hierländer	Nike	Puntigamer, Grawe	Puntigamer	Steirisches Kürbiskernöl	TIM Carsharing, Kleine Zeitung, Energie Steiermark	Sieme Weingüter	Energie Steiermark
TSV Hartberg	(Austria) Markus Schopp	(Austria) Jürgen Heil	Adidas	Eggerglas, ADMIRAL Sportwetten, PROFERTIL Sperm Booster, Kühlanlagen Postl, 11teamsports, Steiermark, Hartberg, PROMACULA, Alois Schweighofer GmbH, Faustmann Möbel	Objekttischlerei Gleichweit	Hochegger Dächer, MOLIN Industrie, KE KELIT	BMW Harmtodt, Energie Hartberg, Boxxenstop, MM Kanal-Rohr-Sanierung, Energie Steiermark	Kühlanlagen Postl	No alternate sponsor
Wolfsberger AC	(Austria) Manfred Schmid	(Austria) Mario Leitgeb	San Sirro	RZ Pellets, Robitsch Obst und Gemüse, wesa.at, Kelag, Kärnten Sport, Kärnten ORF, velox.at	Sorger Salanettis	Velox Bau-Systeme, ADMIRAL	Eskimo Eiszeit Kärnten, Beschriftung Grafik Druck, HERWA Multiclean Gebäudereinigung, Gigasport, Kleine Zeitung	BMW Gönitzer	SBH Rohstoffhandels
WSG Tirol	(Austria) Thomas Silberberger	(Germany) Ferdinand Oswald	Puma	Tiroler Tageszeitung, Tiroler Versicherung, Herz für den Tiroler Fussball	Tirol	Tiroler Wasserkraft, 11teamsports	Fröschl Bau	Volksbank Tirol, Union Investment	Tiroler Versicherung

=== Managerial changes ===
Team	Outgoing manager	Manner of departure	Date of vacancy	Position in the table	Incoming manager	Date of appointment	Ref.
Rheindorf Altach	(Austria) Klaus Schmidt	End of contract	2 June 2023	Pre-season	(Austria) Joachim Standfest	12 June 2023	
LASK	(Austria) Dietmar Kühbauer	Mutual consent	6 June 2023	Pre-season	(Austria) Thomas Sageder	6 June 2023	
Red Bull Salzburg	(Germany) Matthias Jaissle	Sacked	28 July 2023	Pre-season	(Austria) Alexander Hauser (caretaker)	28 July 2023	
Red Bull Salzburg	(Austria) Alexander Hauser (caretaker)	End of caretaker spell	31 July 2023	3rd	(Austria) Gerhard Struber	31 July 2023	
Austria Lustenau	(Austria) Markus Mader	Resigned	13 November 2023	12th	(Germany) Alexander Schneider (caretaker)	13 November 2023	
SK Rapid	(Austria) Zoran Barišić	Sacked	15 November 2023	8th	(Germany) Robert Klauß	20 November 2023	
Austria Lustenau	(Germany) Alexander Schneider (caretaker)	End of caretaker spell	19 December 2023	12th	(Austria) Andreas Heraf	19 December 2023	
LASK	(Austria) Thomas Sageder	Sacked	10 April 2024	4th	(Austria) Thomas Darazs	10 April 2024	
Red Bull Salzburg	(Austria) Gerhard Struber	Sacked	15 April 2024	1st	(Germany) Onur Çinel (caretaker)	15 April 2024	

== Regular season ==
=== League table ===
Pos	Team	Pld	W	D	L	GF	GA	GD	Pts	Qualification
1	Red Bull Salzburg	22	15	5	2	45	12	+33	50	Qualification for the Championship round
2	Sturm Graz	22	13	7	2	37	15	+22	46	Qualification for the Championship round
3	LASK	22	9	8	5	26	18	+8	35	Qualification for the Championship round
4	Austria Klagenfurt	22	8	10	4	29	27	+2	34 (Note: Head to head points: Klagenfurt 4, TSV Hartberg 1.)	Qualification for the Championship round
5	Hartberg	22	9	7	6	33	28	+5	34	Qualification for the Championship round
6	Rapid Wien	22	8	9	5	38	21	+17	33 (Note: Head to head points: Rapid 4, Austria Wien 1.)	Qualification for the Championship round
7	Austria Wien	22	9	6	7	25	22	+3	33	Qualification for the Relegation round
8	Wolfsberger AC	22	8	6	8	29	32	−3	30	Qualification for the Relegation round
9	SCR Altach	22	4	7	11	17	30	−13	19	Qualification for the Relegation round
10	Blau-Weiß Linz	22	4	7	11	22	38	−16	19	Qualification for the Relegation round
11	WSG Tirol	22	4	2	16	20	42	−22	14	Qualification for the Relegation round
12	Austria Lustenau	22	2	4	16	13	49	−36	10	Qualification for the Relegation round

Source: Austrian Football Bundesliga
Rules for classification: 1) Points; 2) Head-to-head record; 3) Goal difference; 4) Goals scored; 5) Matches won; 6) Away matches won; 7) Away goals scored.

=== Results ===
Home \ Away	AKL	ALU	AWI	BWL	LASK	RWI	RBS	ALT	STU	HAR	WAC	WSG
Austria Klagenfurt	—	1–0	2–2	2–0	1–3	1–1	2–2	1–1	0–3	1–1	2–2	1–0
Austria Lustenau	0–1	—	0–2	2–0	1–3	0–5	0–4	0–3	0–1	0–4	2–3	2–3
Austria Wien	2–2	1–0	—	4–0	0–0	0–0	0–0	2–1	0–3	3–1	0–0	2–0
Blau-Weiß Linz	0–0	0–0	1–2	—	2–0	0–5	1–1	1–1	1–1	3–3	2–0	1–2
LASK	2–2	2–0	2–0	2–0	—	1–1	0–1	1–0	3–1	0–0	0–1	1–0
Rapid Wien	2–3	1–1	3–0	1–0	3–3	—	0–1	4–0	1–1	0–1	3–3	1–1
Red Bull Salzburg	1–0	7–0	2–0	0–1	0–1	2–0	—	3–0	1–1	3–2	1–0	3–0
Rheindorf Altach	0–1	3–0	2–1	1–1	0–0	0–2	0–2	—	1–2	1–2	0–0	1–0
Sturm Graz	0–0	2–0	0–1	4–1	2–0	1–1	2–2	1–0	—	2–1	4–0	1–0
TSV Hartberg	0–3	2–2	2–1	3–2	0–0	1–0	1–5	0–0	1–1	—	2–0	3–0
Wolfsberger AC	4–0	1–1	1–0	2–1	2–1	0–2	1–2	1–1	1–2	0–3	—	4–1
WSG Tirol	1–3	0–2	0–2	2–4	1–1	1–2	0–2	5–1	0–2	1–0	2–3	—

Source: https://www.bundesliga.at/de/spielplan/
Legend: Blue = home team win; Yellow = draw; Red = away team win.

== Championship round ==
The points obtained during the regular season were halved (and rounded down) before the start of the playoff. As a result, the teams started with the following points before the playoff: Red Bull Salzburg 25, Sturm Graz 23, LASK 17, Austria Klagenfurt 17, TSV Hartberg 17, and Rapid Wien 16. The points of LASK and Rapid Wien were rounded down – in the event of any ties on points at the end of the playoffs, a half point was added for these teams.

Pos	Team	Pld	W	D	L	GF	GA	GD	Pts	Qualification	STU	RBS	LASK	RWI	HAR	AKL
1	Sturm Graz (C)	32	19	10	3	56	23	+33	44	Qualification for the Champions League league stage	—	0–1	1–0	1–0	1–1	2–0
2	Red Bull Salzburg	32	20	7	5	74	29	+45	42	Qualification for the Champions League third qualifying round (Note: Since the Europa League winners, Atalanta qualified for the Champions League via league position, Red Bull Salzburg were promoted from the Champions League second qualifying round to the third qualifying round as one of the two teams with the highest coefficient in the second qualifying round.)	2–2	—	7–1	1–1	5–1	4–2
3	LASK	32	14	10	8	43	33	+10	34	Qualification for the Europa League play-off round (Note: The 2023–24 Austrian Cup winners qualified for the Europa League play-off round. Since the cup winners (Sturm Graz) qualified based on league position, the Europa League spot was passed to the third-placed team.)	2–2	3–1	—	5–0	1–3	1–0
4	Rapid Wien	32	11	12	9	47	35	+12	28	Qualification for the Europa League second qualifying round	1–3	2–0	0–0	—	0–3	1–1
5	Hartberg	32	12	9	11	49	52	−3	28	Qualification for the Conference League play-offs	1–3	1–5	1–2	0–3	—	3–2
6	Austria Klagenfurt	32	9	12	11	40	50	−10	22		0–4	4–3	0–2	0–1	2–2	—

Source: Austrian Football Bundesliga
Legend: Blue = home team win; Yellow = draw; Red = away team win.
Rules for classification: 1) Points; 2) Points with (possible) half points subtracted due to rounding; 3) Head-to-head points; 4) Head-to-head goal difference; 5) Head-to-head goals scored; 6) Goal difference; 7) Goals scored; 8) Matches won; 9) Away matches won; 10) Away goals scored.
(C) Champions

== Relegation round ==
The points obtained during the regular season were halved (and rounded down) before the start of the playoff. As a result, the teams started with the following points before the playoff: Austria Wien 16, Wolfsberg 15, Rheindorf Altach 9, Blau-Weiß Linz 9, Tirol 7, and Lustenau 5. The points of Austria Wien, Rheindorf Altach and Blau-Weiß Linz were rounded down – in the event of any ties on points at the end of the playoffs, a half point will be added for these teams.

Pos	Team	Pld	W	D	L	GF	GA	GD	Pts	Qualification	WOL	AWI	BWL	ALT	WAT	LUS
1	Wolfsberger AC	32	12	10	10	41	39	+2	31	Qualification for the Conference League play-offs	—	0–1	0–2	0–0	3–1	1–1
2	Austria Wien (O)	32	12	10	10	35	34	+1	29	Qualification for the Conference League play-offs	0–4	—	0–0	2–2	3–0	1–1
3	Blau-Weiß Linz	32	7	11	14	33	48	−15	22		0–0	1–2	—	2–1	3–2	0–0
4	Rheindorf Altach	32	6	13	13	27	40	−13	21		0–1	1–1	2–2	—	0–0	2–2
5	WSG Tirol	32	7	5	20	29	55	−26	19		1–1	1–0	2–1	0–1	—	0–0
6	Austria Lustenau (R)	32	4	9	19	22	58	−36	16	Relegation to Austrian Football Second League	1–2	2–0	1–0	0–1	1–2	—

Legend: Blue = home team win; Yellow = draw; Red = away team win.
Rules for classification: 1) Points; 2) Points with (possible) half points subtracted due to rounding; 3) Head-to-head points; 4) Head-to-head goal difference; 5) Head-to-head goals scored; 6) Head-to-head away goals scored; 7) Goal difference; 8) Goals scored; 9) Matches won; 10) Away matches won; 11) Away goals scored.
(O) Play-off winners; (R) Relegated

== Conference League play-offs ==
The winner and runner-up of the relegation round, the fifth-placed team from the championship round play to determine the qualifier to the Conference League second qualifying round.

Semi-final			Final
			8	Austria Wien	2	1	3
7	Wolfsberger AC	1	5	Hartberg	1	0	1
8	Austria Wien	2

=== Semi-final ===
21 May 2024	Wolfsberger AC	1–2	Austria Wien	Wolfsberg
20:00	Omić (yellow card) 14'; Boakye 64'; Veratschnig (yellow card) 79'	Report	Meisl 8'; Potzmann (yellow card) 56'; Fischer (yellow card) 58'; Asllani (yellow card) 63'; Fitz 90+4'	Stadium: Lavanttal-Arena; Referee: Stefan Ebner

=== Final ===
24 May 2024	Austria Wien	2–1	Hartberg	Vienna
19:30	Wels (yellow card) 47'; Holland 51'; Fitz 58' (pen.); Saljic (yellow card) 90+6'	Report	Heil (yellow card) 29'; Avdijaj (yellow card) 84'; Entrup 84'	Stadium: Generali Arena; Referee: Sebastian Gishamer

28 May 2024	Hartberg	0–1 (1–3 agg.)	Austria Wien
19:00			Holland 39'

== Statistics ==
=== Top scorers ===
Rank	Player	Club	Goals
1	(Ivory Coast) Karim Konaté	Red Bull Salzburg	20
2	(Austria) Marco Grüll	SK Rapid	13
2	(Austria) Maximilian Entrup	TSV Hartberg	13
4	(Kosovo) Donis Avdijaj	Hartberg	12
4	(Austria) Thierno Ballo	Wolfsberger AC	12
4	(Croatia) Marin Ljubičić	LASK	12
7	(Austria) Andreas Gruber	SK Rapid	11
8	(Austria) Dominik Fitz	Austria Wien	10
8	(Brazil) (Austria) Ronivaldo	Blau-Weiß Linz	10
8	(Ghana) Augustine Boakye	Wolfsberger AC	10
8	(Germany) Sinan Karweina	Austria Klagenfurt	10
12	(Scotland) Andy Irving	Austria Klagenfurt	9
12	(Austria) Robert Žulj	LASK	9
12	(Georgia (country)) Otar Kiteishvili	Sturm Graz	9

=== Hat-tricks ===
Player	Club	Against	Result	Date
(Austria) Marco Grüll	SK Rapid	TSV Hartberg	0–3 (A)	31 March 2024
(Croatia) Marin Ljubičić	LASK	Red Bull Salzburg	3–1 (H)	12 April 2024

=== Discipline ===
==== Player ====
- Most yellow cards: 10
  - (Germany) Mike-Steven Bähre (Rheindorf Altach)
- Most red cards: 2
  - Pius Grabher (Austria Lustenau)
  - (Luxembourg) Marvin Martins (Austria Wien)
  - (Netherlands) Terence Kongolo (SK Rapid)

==== Club ====
- Most yellow cards: 82
  - Rheindorf Altach
- Most red cards: 5
  - Austria Wien
- Fewest yellow cards: 52
  - SK Rapid
- Fewest red cards: 0
  - Austria Klagenfurt

== Awards ==
=== Annual awards ===
Award	Winner	Club
Player of the Season	(Georgia (country)) Otar Kiteishvili	Sturm Graz
Goalkeeper of the Season	(Austria) Alexander Schlager	Red Bull Salzburg
Newcomer of the Season	(Ivory Coast) Karim Konaté	Red Bull Salzburg
Coach of the Season	(Austria) Christian Ilzer	Sturm Graz

=== Team of the Year ===

Team of the Year
Goalkeeper	(Austria) Tobias Lawal (LASK)			
Defence	(Bosnia and Herzegovina) Jusuf Gazibegović (Sturm Graz)	(Serbia) Strahinja Pavlović (Red Bull Salzburg)	(Switzerland) Gregory Wüthrich (Sturm Graz)	(Austria) Manuel Pfeifer (Hartberg)
Midfield	(Austria) Alexander Prass (Sturm Graz)	(Slovenia) Jon Gorenc Stanković (Sturm Graz)	(Georgia (country)) Otar Kiteishvili (Sturm Graz)	(Austria) Marco Grüll (Rapid Wien)
Attack	(Ivory Coast) Karim Konaté (Red Bull Salzburg)		(Austria) Maximilian Entrup (Hartberg)	

== Attendances ==
Rapid Wien drew the highest average home attendance in the 2023-24 edition of the Austrian Football Bundesliga.

#	Football club	Home games	Average attendance
1	Rapid Wien	11	18,651
2	Sturm Graz	11	14,657
3	Austria Wien	11	12,418
4	LASK	11	12,121
5	Red Bull Salzburg	11	11,457
6	SCR Altach	11	5,360
7	BW Linz	11	4,991
8	Austria Klagenfurt	11	4,526
9	Austria Lustenau	11	3,956
10	Wolfsberger AC	11	3,647
11	TSV Hartberg	11	2,925
12	WSG Tirol	11	2,010
