= Hirter =

Beer Brand

Hirter beer is a brand of beer that has been produced in Carinthia, Austria since 1270 AD, making it the second oldest private brewery in Austria. The flavor has been described as "roasty and malty with a small earthy hop presence". Hirter beer has a longer stocking time and does not use pasteurization. It has an ABV of 8.3%.
