= Philipp Semlic =

Austrian football manager (born 1983)

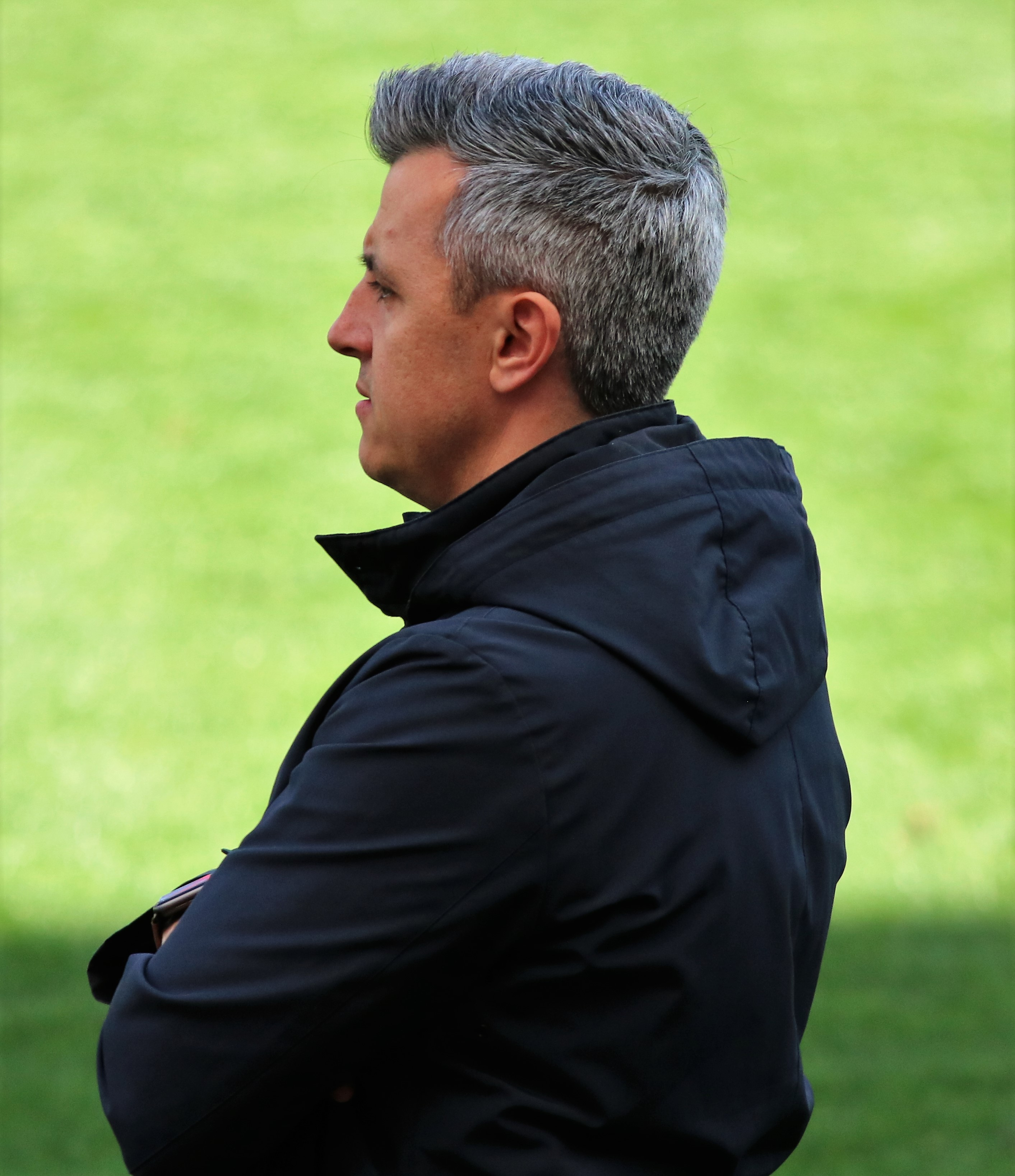
- Semlic with SV Lafnitz in 2022

Personal information
- Date of birth: 21 April 1983 (age 43)
- Place of birth: Vorau, Austria

Team information
- Current team: WSG Tirol (head coach)

Youth career
- 1991–1999: SVH Waldbach

Senior career*
Years	Team	Apps	(Gls)
1999–2006	SVH Waldbach		
2006–2010	USC Sonnhofen	139	(17)

Managerial career
- –2009: USC Sonnhofen youth
- 2009: SC Union Rabenwald youth
- 2010–2013: TSV Hartberg youth
- 2012–2013: TSV Hartberg assistance coach
- 2013: SK Sturm Graz (women) caretaker
- 2014: USC Sonnhofen (assistance coach)
- 2015–2016: TSV Hartberg II
- 2016–2017: TSV Hartberg
- 2017: Academy SK Sturm Graz assistance coach
- 2018–2020: Academy SK Sturm Graz
- 2020–2023: SV Lafnitz
- 2024: SKN St. Pölten
- 2024–: WSG Tirol
- * Club domestic league appearances and goals

Philipp Semlic (born 21 April 1983 in Vorau) is an Austrian football manager and former professional footballer who is the current head coach of WSG Tirol.

== Early life ==
Semlic began his playing career at SVH Waldbach. For the 2006–07 season, he moved to USC Sonnhofen. After four seasons at Sonnhofen, he retired in 2010 at the age of 27.

Semlic studied sports sciences, physical education and mathematics as part of a teaching degree and taught as a schoolteacher in Graz, Austria. During his studies, he successfully completed training as a ski instructor.

== Career ==
Semlic served as a youth coach at TSV Hartberg from January 2010. Between 2012 and 2013, he also acted as assistant coach for the club's first team under Paul Gludovatz. At the end of the 2012–13 season, he departed from Hartberg.

In September 2013, Semlic was appointed as caretaker manager of the SK Sturm Graz women's team, but was soon replaced by Markus Hiden. He remained with the club as the coach of the women's squad. From January 2014, he served as assistant coach to Roland Spreitzer at USC Sonnhofen.

In January 2015, Semlic was named manager of TSV Hartberg's fifth-division reserve team. Ahead of the 2016-17 season, he was appointed joint head coach of the club's third-division first team alongside Uwe Hölzl. Under their stewardship, Hartberg secured promotion to the Austrian Second League. Following the promotion, Semlic left Hartberg and joined the SK Sturm Graz academy as a coach.

In January 2020, Semlic was appointed manager of the second-division club SV Lafnitz. After three and a half years in charge, he left the club at the end of the 2022-23 season. In late 2023, he obtained the UEFA pro licence from the Austrian Football Association, the highest qualification available to professional coaches.

During the 2023–24 winter transfer window, Semlic took over as manager of league rivals SKN St. Pölten. After eleven matches in charge, during which the team recorded only three victories, he resigned from the position in May 2024. In 2024, Semlic was appointed manager of Bundesliga club WSG Tirol, succeeding Thomas Silberberger.
