= Brewery Puntigam =

Brewery in Graz, Austria

- Location: Graz, Styria, Austria
- Opened: 1838
- Owned by: Brau Union
- Parent: Heineken International
- Website: https://www.puntigamer.at/

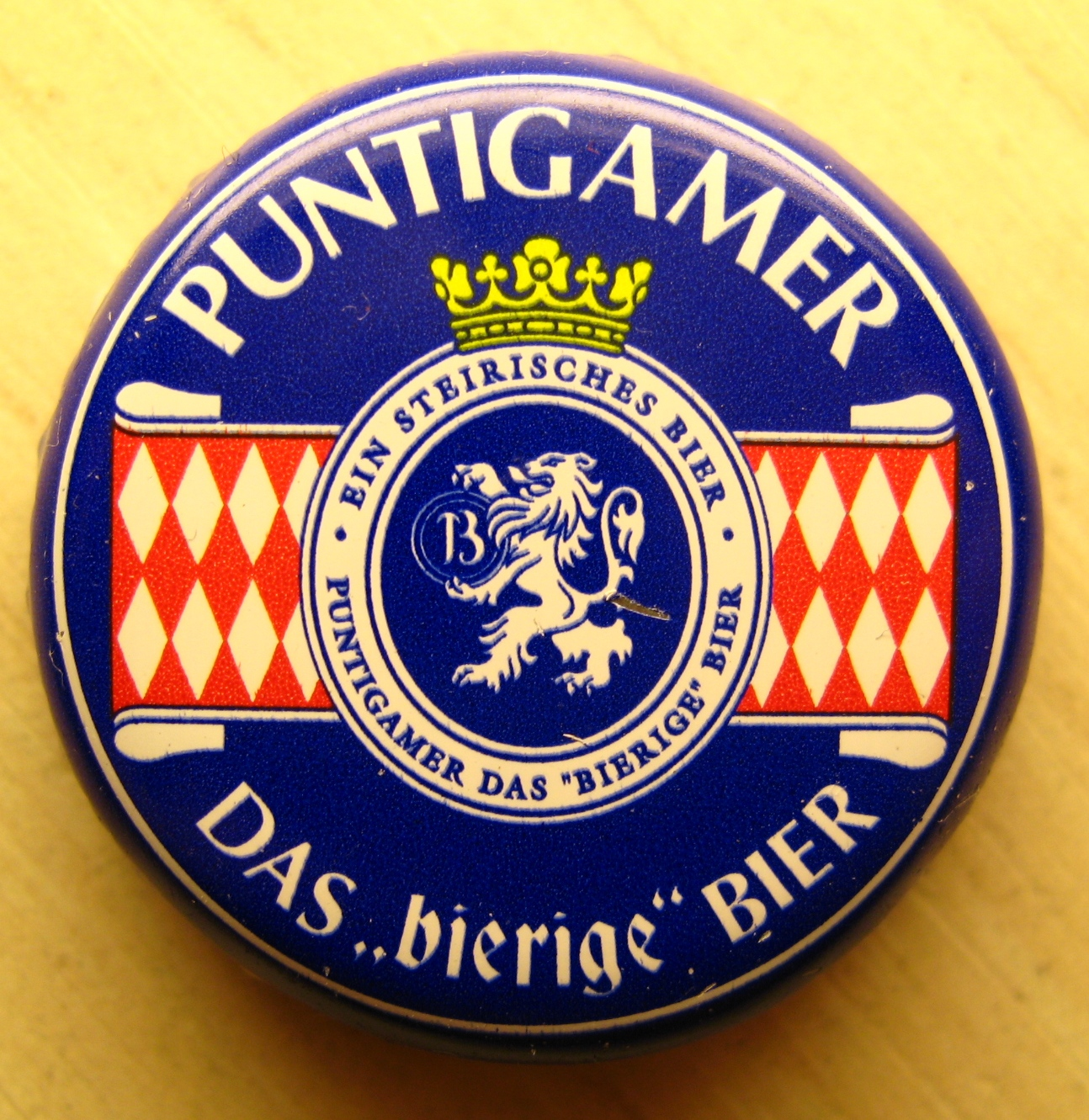
Beer Cap

The Brewery Puntigam is part of Brau Union, the largest Austrian brewer, whose majority shareholder is the Dutch brewing company Heineken. Brewery Puntigam one of the oldest in Styria is located in Puntigam the 17th city district of Graz.

== History ==
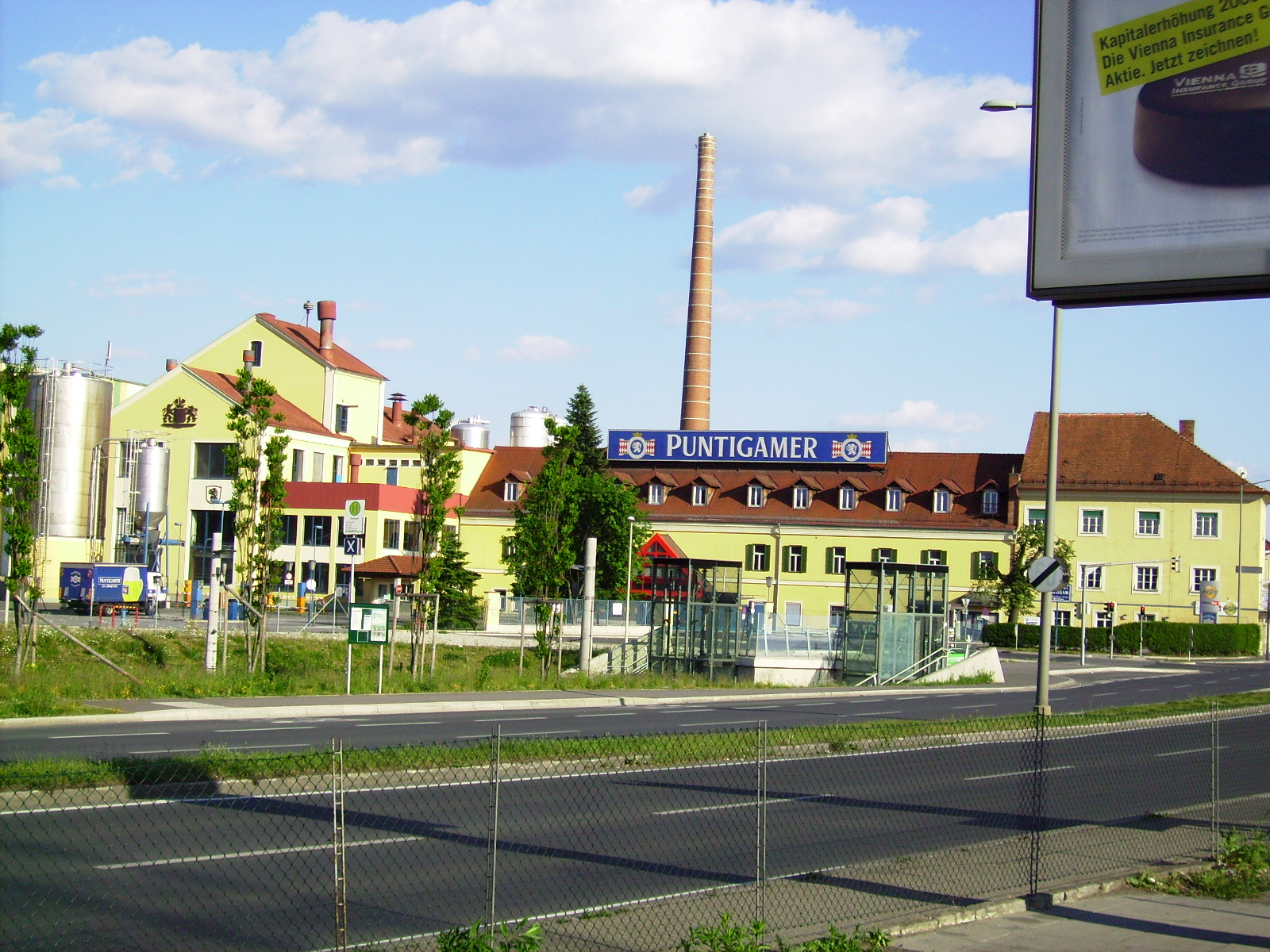
Brewery Puntigam Building in Graz

The brewery was established in the southern region of Graz near Feldkirchen bei Graz as early as 1478. The name Puntigam was originally a family name, not a location name. Located on the former "Kommerzialstraße" (current Triesterstraße), which led to Trieste there was a mansion with an attached inn, a small brewery, and a beer garden. The construction is dated to the year 1772, as indicated by an inscription on an archway. Among the numerous small breweries that emerged in Graz from the 15th century, only a few managed to endure, such as the Puntigam Brewery.

The brewery was officially founded in 1838 by Franz Knabl from Graz († March 3, 1849) on the grounds of Puntigamhof. Entrepreneur Franz Hold acquired the brewery from the Knabl family in 1840 and began a systematic expansion and modernization of the facility, which subsequently transformed into a large industrial brewery. By 1872, they were already producing around 100,000 hectoliters of beer. In 1874, the brewery's company fire brigade was established. In 1889, the brewery was taken over by the Schreiner family. The company's name was changed to "Erste Grazer Actienbrauerei vormals Schreiner & Söhne." Ten years later, they employed approximately 400 workers, and the annual beer production had increased to a record level of 380,000 hectoliters by 1913.

The Puntigam Brewery exported its products throughout the entire territory of the Austro-Hungarian Monarchy and acquired the Graz Brewery Japl, as well as breweries in Fürstenfeld, Mürzzuschlag, and Feldbach. Additionally, it held interests in the Laibach Brewery Corporation "Union" and the "United Carinthian Breweries A.G." in Villach.

Following the First World War and the associated loss of a large sales area due to the division of the former monarchy, the production volume shrank to one-tenth of the pre-war record value. After the economic crisis in 1935, there was a closer relationship with the Reininghaus Brewery.

In 1943, a merger took place with the second major brewery in Graz, owned by the Reininghaus brothers. Their own facility in Eggenberg was eventually shut down in 1947. Simultaneously, the entire beer production was relocated to Puntigam. Both brands were preserved.

=== Recent developments ===
The current annual beer production stands at approximately one million hectoliters. This makes Puntigamer one of the best-selling beers in Austria.

On May 2, 2022, the trial against 24 defendants began, accused of allegedly organizing theft of beer valued at 1.7 million euros as simulated damaged goods over several years (2009-2017), accompanied by beer tax evasion.

== Sponsoring ==
Since 1996, Puntigamer has been the main sponsor of the Graz football club SK Sturm. Furthermore, the brewery supports the football clubs Austria Wien and Wolfsberger AC, as well as the Austrian ice hockey team Graz 99ers.
