= Stephan Helm =

Austrian football manager (born 1983)

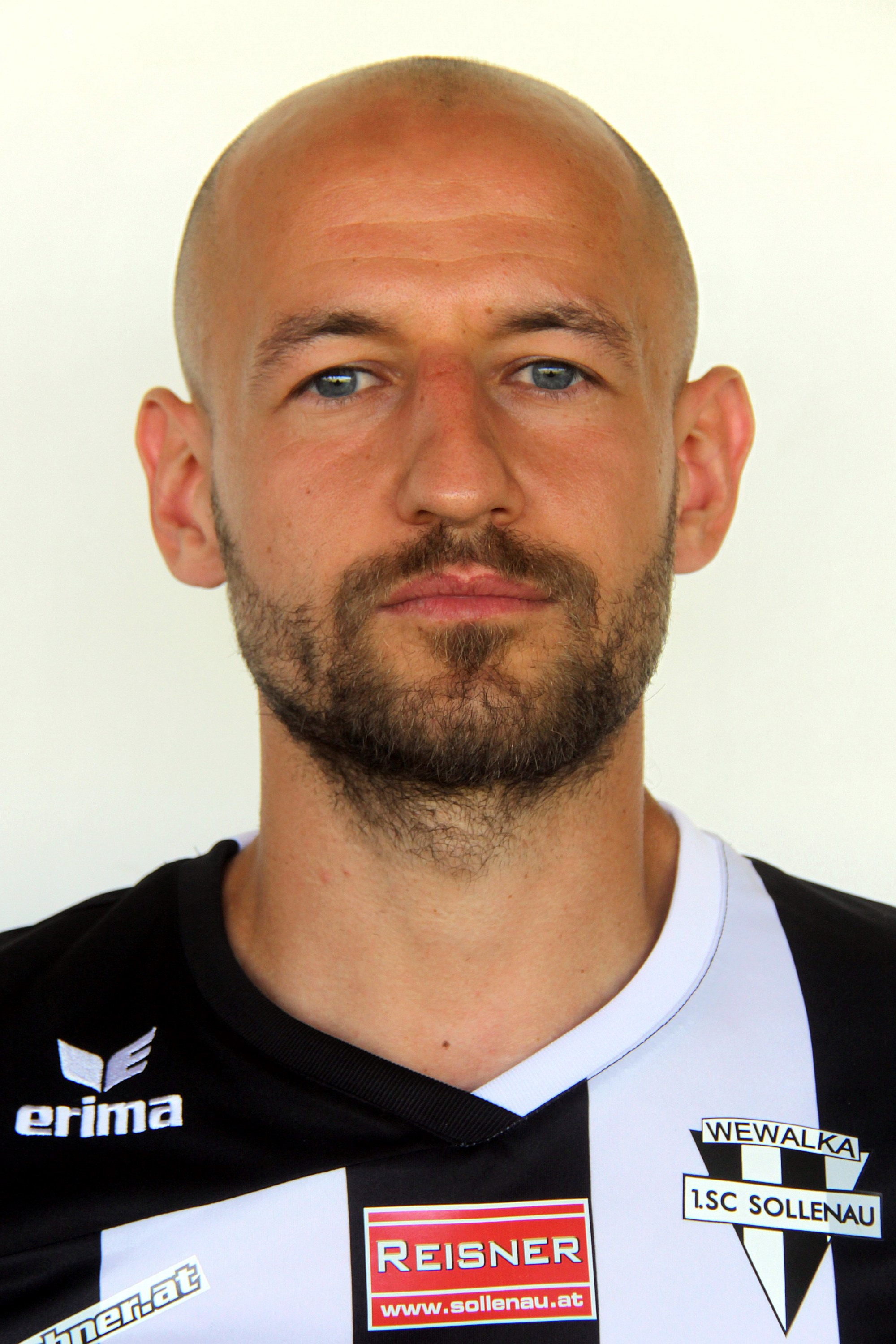
- Helm in 2014

Personal information
- Date of birth: 10 April 1983 (age 43)
- Place of birth: Vienna, Austria

Senior career*
Years	Team	Apps	(Gls)
–2004	UFC Pamhagen		
2004–2006	FC Mönchhof		
2006–2007	UFC Purbach		
2007–2009	SV Mattersburg II		
2009–2011	SC-ESV Parndorf 1919		
2011–2013	UFC Purbach		
2013–2015	1. SC Sollenau		
2015	SC Neusiedl am See 1919		
2016–2017	UFC Pamhagen		

Managerial career
- 2010: UFC Pamhagen
- 2016–2017: UFC Pamhagen
- 2018: FK Austria Wien (video analyst)
- 2018–2020: Grasshopper Club Zurich (video analyst)
- 2020–2021: LASK (assistant)
- 2021–2023: SKN St. Pölten
- 2024–2026: FK Austria Wien
- * Club domestic league appearances and goals

Stephan Helm (born 10 April 1983) is an Austrian football manager and former midfielder. In 2010 he became a football coach, and in 2024, was appointed as head coach of FK Austria Wien.

== Playing career ==
Helm started his playing career with Austrian side UFC Pamhagen. In 2004, he signed for Austrian side FC Mönchhof. In 2006, he signed for Austrian side UFC Purbach. In 2007, he signed for Austrian side SV Mattersburg II. In 2009, he signed for Austrian side SC-ESV Parndorf 1919. In 2011, he returned to Austrian side UFC Purbach. In 2013, he signed for Austrian side 1. SC Sollenau. In 2015, he signed for Austrian side SC Neusiedl am See 1919. In 2016, he returned to Austrian side UFC Pamhagen.

== Managerial career ==
In 2010, Helm was appointed manager of Austrian side UFC Pamhagen. In 2016, he returned to UFC Pamhagen. In 2018, he was appointed as a video analyst of Austrian side FK Austria Wien. After that, he was appointed as a video analyst of Swiss side Grasshopper Club Zurich. In 2020, he was appointed as an assistant manager of Austrian side LASK. In 2021, he was appointed manager of Austrian side SKN St. Pölten. He was described as "varied between a three-man and four-man defense" while managing the club. In 2024, he returned to Austrian side FK Austria Wien as manager.

== Personal life ==
Helm was born on 10 April 1983 in Vienna, Austria. He obtained a UEFA Pro License. He is a native of Pamhagen, Austria. He has been married. He has a daughter and a son.

== Managerial statistics ==
As of match played 23 October 2026

Managerial record by team and tenure
Team	From	To	Record							
Team	From	To	G	W	D	L	GF	GA	GD	Win %
SKN St. Pölten	1 July 2021	23 October 2023	69	34	11	24	114	81	+33	49.28
Austria Wien	1 July 2024	24 October 2026	94	46	15	33	159	131	+28	48.94
Total			163	80	26	57	273	212	+61	49.08
