= Tiroler Tageszeitung =

Austrian daily newspaper

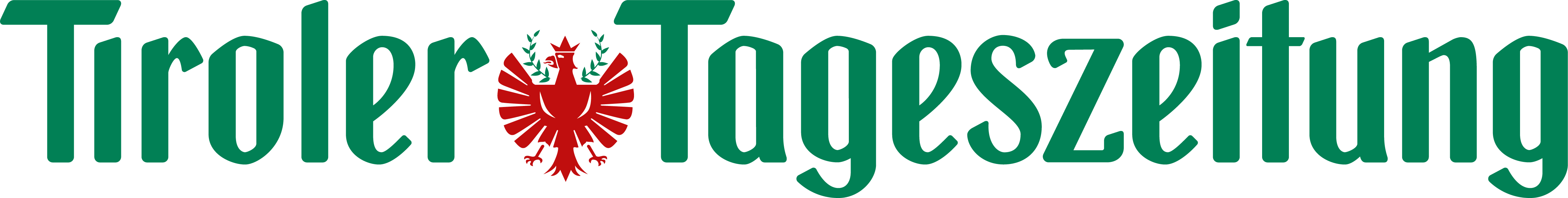
- Owner: Moser Holding
- Publisher: Schlüssel Verlag/Moser Holding
- Founded: 11 June 1945; 81 years ago
- Language: German
- Headquarters: Innsbruck
- Country: Austria
- Sister newspapers: TT Compact
- Website: www.tt.com

Tiroler Tageszeitung (also known as TT) is a provincial daily newspaper published in Innsbruck, Austria. The paper has been in circulation since 1945 and is the newspaper with the widest reach in the Austrian state of Tyrol.

== History and profile ==
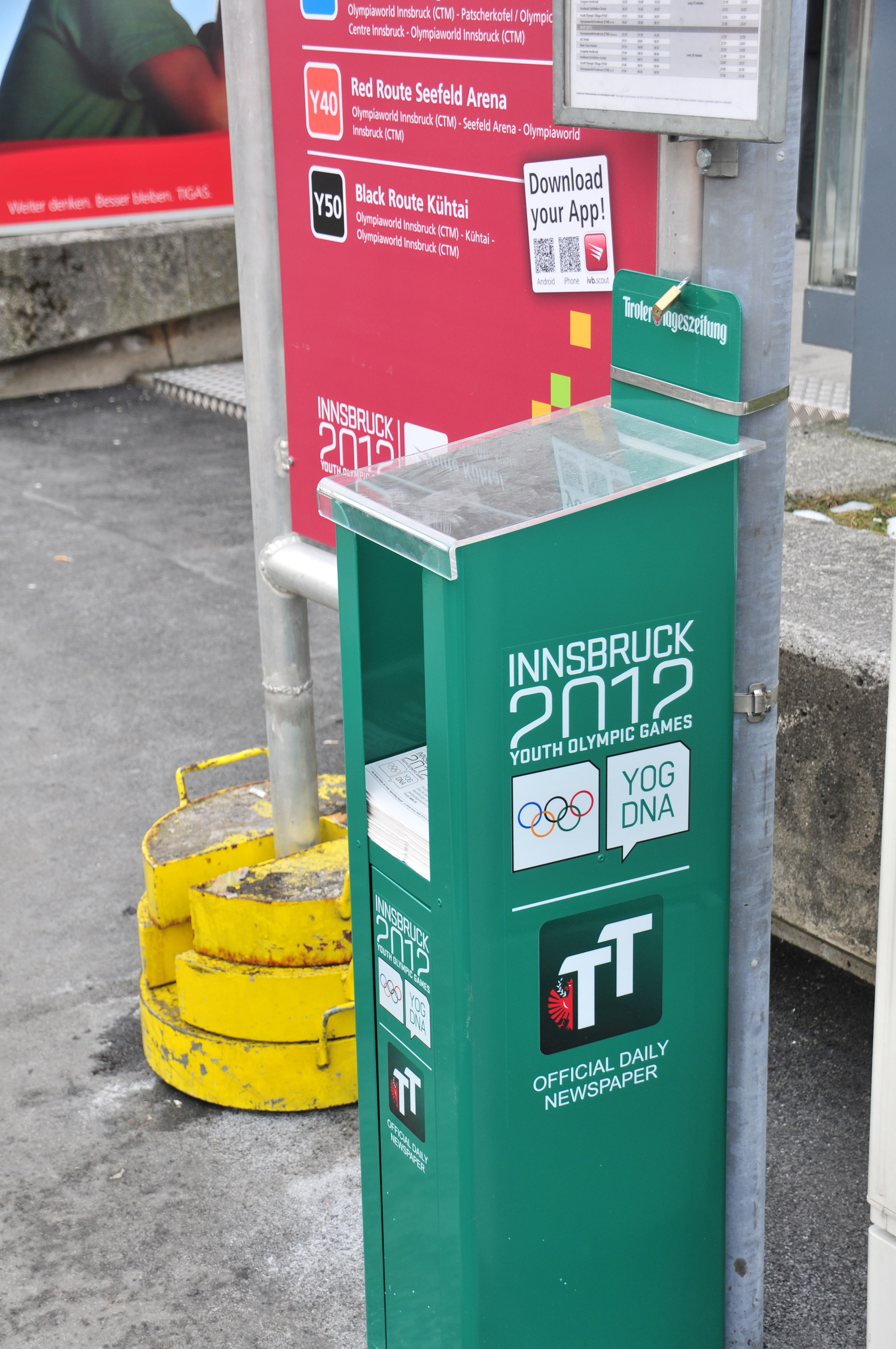
TT's sponsorship for Innsbruck 2012 Youth Olympics

TT was first published on 11 June 1945. During this period Austria was ruled by the Allies following World War II. Its foundation was supported by the French and Americans, but it was under the influence of the former. Later the ownership of TT was transferred to Austrians.

The German company Axel Springer Verlag acquired a stake of the paper in 1989 and had the majority stake of the paper in the 1990s. The paper is wholly owned by the Moser Holding. In 2008 the holding launched a free daily newspaper, namely TT Compact. The publisher of TT is the Schlüssel Verlag/Moser company.

TT is based in Innsbruck and is a leading publication in Tyrol region. The paper is described as a conservative publication. However, the paper has no political affiliation and has an independent stance.

TT is published in five regional editions. The paper has four main sections: international news, national news, regional news and sports. It is not an advertisement-oriented publication. The paper was the only official sponsor of the Innsbruck 2012 Youth Olympics.

In 2008 TT published a letter of German immunologist Clemens Sorg following his dismissal from the post as the rector of the Medical University of Innsbruck due to his involvement in a stem cell scandal.

== Circulation ==
TT was the sixth best selling Austrian newspaper in 2002 with a circulation of 122,000 copies. The paper had a circulation of 112,690 copies in 2003. It was the fifth best selling newspaper in Austria with a circulation of 121,000 copies in 2004.

The regional market share of TT was 63% and its regional readership was 47% in 2006. Its circulation in 2007 was 111,000 copies. In the period of 2007–2008 the daily had a readership of 3.89%. The 2008 circulation of the paper was 109,716 copies, making it the sixth most read newspaper in Austria. Its circulation was 108,045 copies in 2009 and 105,861 copies in 2010. The daily had a circulation of 87,149 copies in 2011. Its average circulation was 97,000 copies in 2013. The magazine sold 91,045 copies in 2018.
