= Grazer Wechselseitige Versicherung =

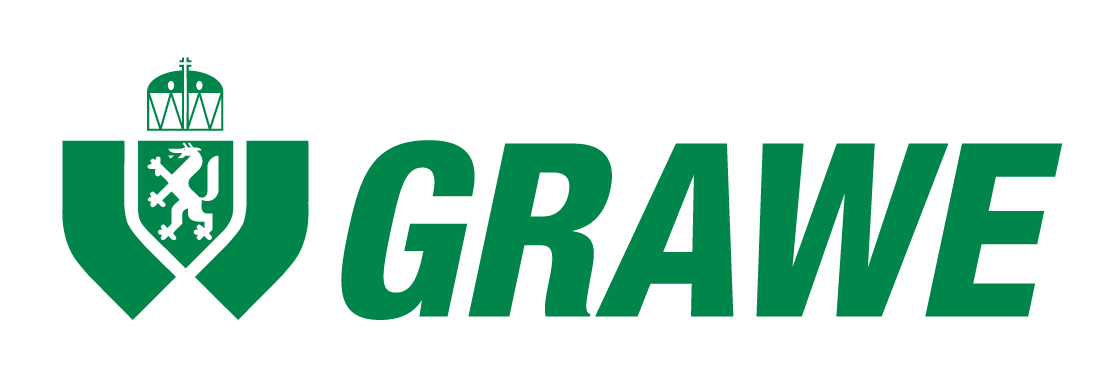
- Industry: Insurance
- Founded: 1828
- Headquarters: Graz, Austria
- Website: www.grawe.at

Grazer Wechselseitige Versicherung or Graz Mutual Insurance Company is one of the largest Central European insurance companies. Its headquarters are located in Graz, Austria.

== History ==
GRAWE was founded in 1828 by Archduke Johann as an "insurance institute for Styria, Carinthia and Carniola", with an original focus purely on fire insurance.

== Subsidiaries ==
GRAWE is the fifth largest insurance group in Austria. GRAWE has subsidiaries in Central and Eastern European countries such as Slovenia, Croatia, Hungary, Serbia, Bosnia and Herzegovina, Ukraine, Bulgaria, Romania, Moldova, Macedonia, Montenegro and Cyprus.

=== Serbia ===
GRAWE Osiguranje a.d. was registered as the first insurance company with foreign capital in Serbia. The company entered the Serbian market in 1997. GRAWE started out as a Greenfield investment with the aim to grow and develop in the Serbian market.

== Partnerships ==
GRAWE has agreements with Kärntner Landesversicherung (Carinthian insurance), Niederösterreichischen Versicherung (Lower Austrian insurance), Oberösterreichischen Versicherung (Upper Austrian insurance), Tiroler Versicherung (Tirolean insurance), and Vorarlberger Landesversicherung (Vorarlberg insurance). The network is called the Vereinigung Österreichischer Länderversicherer (Insurers association of Austrian countries).

== GRAWE group ==
In addition to the insurance sector, the Group is also involved in real estate management (e.g.,GRAWE Property Management Ltd, STIWOG), banks, and various investments, with many affiliates (e.g., Capital Bank GRAWE Group Ltd, Security KAG, Bank Burgenland).

== Size ==
The annual premium income of the Group (the "GRAWE Group") amounted 693.7 million euros in the fiscal year 2007. The number of managed contracts is just under 3.7 million.

== Management ==
Director General of GRAWE is Mag. Klaus Scheitegel. In the executive team, Gernot Reiter is serving as its deputy, alongside Georg Schneider and Paul Swoboda.

Supervisory Board President, Dr. Philipp Meran, traditionally, a direct descendant of the founder.
