= Pfanner =

Austrian beverage producer

Hermann Pfanner Getränke GmbH
- Type: Ges.m.b.H. (Private)
- Industry: Fruit juices
- Founded: 1854
- Headquarters: Lauterach, Austria
- Products: Fruit juices, ice teas, fruit juice concentrates
- Number of employees: 800
- Website: www.pfanner.com

Hermann Pfanner Getränke GmbH is an Austrian beverage producer. It claims to have produced over 420 million liters in 2010, with more than 80% of the total volume exported to more than 80 countries. Headquartered in Lauterach in Vorarlberg, its main markets are Germany, Italy, Austria, Romania and the Czech Republic.

According to company-related reports, Pfanner is the leader in the German ice tea market with a share of 19.8 percent. It's also one of the largest fruit processors and juice producers in Europe.

== History ==
The company was founded in 1854. In 1856 Max Hermann Pfanner bought the "Gasthof Hirschen" restaurant in Lauterach and founded a small in-house brewery. In 1919 his grandson Hermann Pfanner took over and expanded the business by selling various agricultural products, wines and spirits.

By 1933 fruit juice was produced for the first time. After Hermann Pfanner died, his wife Ferdinanda and their children continued the business. Due to thoughtful business practices and technical innovations, they could pass on the company to the next generation (Hedwig, Hans, Erwin and Egon Pfanner). This generation expanded the fruit juice business internationally. By 1984 these efforts were rewarded by the Austrian government with the coat of arms of Austria. In 1988 Hermann Pfanner Getränke GmbH was founded and handed over to the succeeding generation.

In 2001 fruit juice production in Hamburg was started to cater to the growing German market. Pfanner is still a family-run business, managed by the Pfanner, Schneider and Dietrich families.

In 2006, the company exceeded 200 million Euros in sales for the first time.

== Products ==
Pfanner produces about 210 different products, fruit juices being among the best known ones. The company also produces ice teas, lemonades and other soft drinks. The company also offers contract bottling services.

== Pfanner and Fairtrade ==
Pfanner started cooperating with Fairtrade in 2001. Today Pfanner is the biggest Fairtrade partner worldwide in the fruit juice sector and offers the widest range of fair trade products, according to the company.

== Production sites ==
Pfanner operates factories in Austria, Germany, Italy and Ukraine. Their headquarters are in Lauterach, the biggest production site is in Enns (Upper Austria). Other sites are in Hamburg (Germany), Policoro (Italy) and in Bar (Ukraine).
