= Manfred Schmid (footballer) =

Austrian football manager (born 1971)

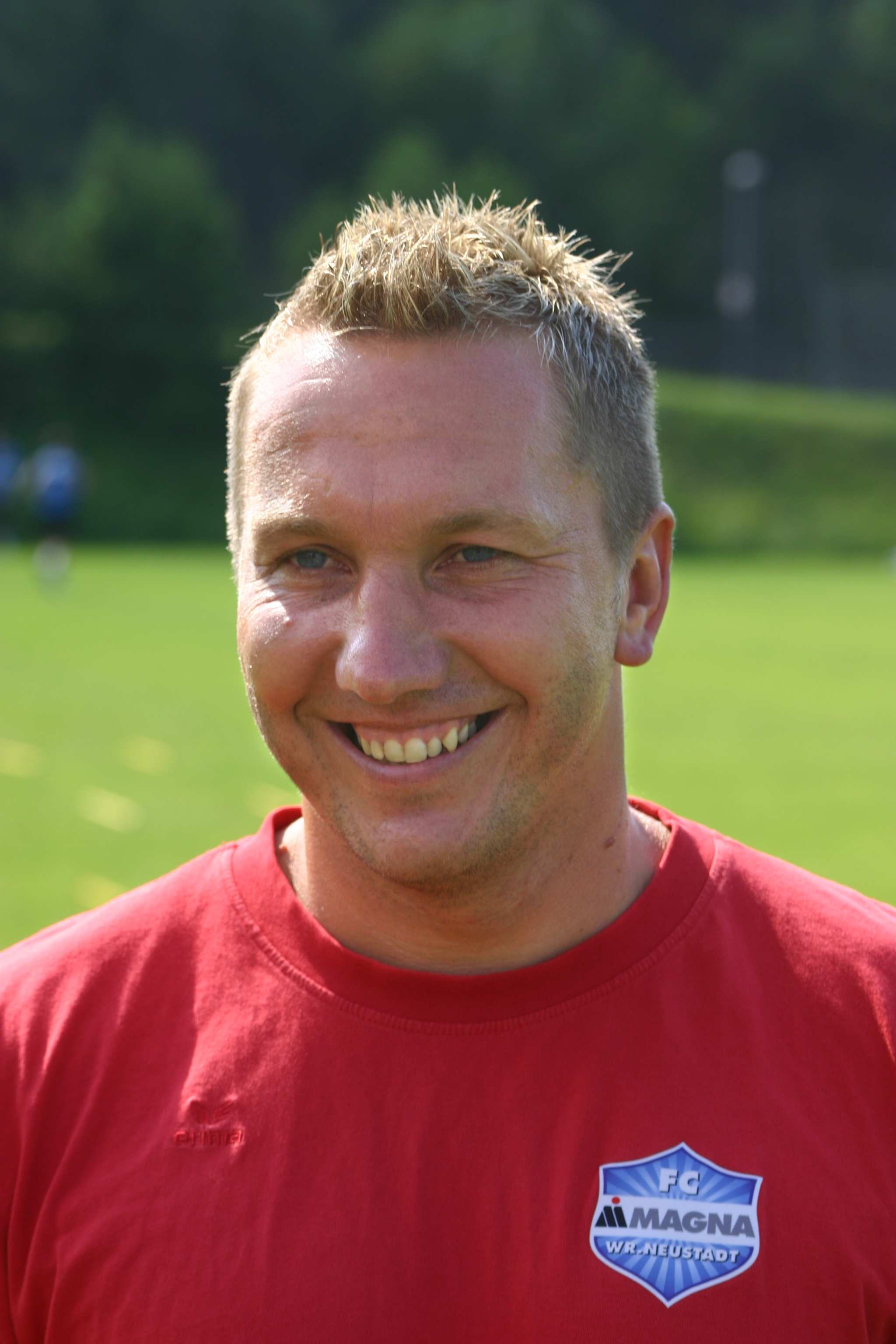
- Manfred Schmid in 2008

Personal information
- Date of birth: 20 February 1971 (age 55)
- Place of birth: Wien, Austria
- Height: 1.75 m (5 ft 9 in)
- Position: Midfielder

Youth career
- 1. Simmeringer SC
- –1988: Austria Wien

Senior career*
Years	Team	Apps	(Gls)
1988–2002	Austria Wien	224	(7)
2002–2003	LASK Linz	17	(0)
2003	Austria Wien II	11	(0)
2003–2004	FC Mönchhof		
2004–2006	SV Großweikersdorf		
2006–2008	FK Blau-Weiß Hollabrunn		

Managerial career
- 2002–2007: Austria Wien (youth)
- 2007–2008: Austria Wien II (assistant)
- 2008: Schwanenstadt
- 2008–2012: Wiener Neustadt (assistant)
- 2012–2013: Austria Wien (assistant)
- 2013–2017: Köln (assistant)
- 2017–2018: Borussia Dortmund (assistant)
- 2019: Köln (scout)
- 2019: Köln (assistant)
- 2019: Köln (caretaker)
- 2021–2022: Austria Wien
- 2023–2024: Wolfsberger AC
- 2024–2026: TSV Hartberg
- * Club domestic league appearances and goals

Manfred Schmid (born 20 February 1971) is an Austrian professional football manager and former player.

== Playing career ==
Schmid played for Austria Wien from 1989 to 2002 and LASK Linz from 2002 to 2003.

== Coaching career ==
Schmid was the assistant coach for the reserve team of Austria Wien in the 2007–08 season. However, during the winter break, he took over as head coach of Schwanenstadt 08 and was there until the end of the season. After his coaching stint at Schwanenstadt 08, he became assistant coach at Wiener Neustadt. He left Wiener Neustadt to return to Austria Wien where he became assistant coach to the first team. He became assistant coach of 1. FC Köln after the 2012–13 season. He has had talks with Austria Wien about the vacant head coach's job. However, Köln refused to release him. He was assistant coach at Borussia Dortmund from 2017 to 2018.

He was named the head coach of Köln on 9 November 2019 but never managed a game and Markus Gisdol took over nine days later.

During the 2021–22 season, he returned to Austria Wien, securing a contract as head coach extending until June 2023. In his inaugural season at the helm, he swiftly guided the club to third place in the standings of the Austrian Bundesliga, earning them a spot in European competitions. Despite their participation in the UEFA Europa Conference League after faltering in the UEFA Europa League playoffs, Austria Wien faced an early exit in the group stage with only two points. However, on 5 December 2022, his tenure came to an end as his contract was mutually terminated due to divergent visions regarding the team's sporting trajectory between Schmid and the club's supervisory board.

On 6 March 2023, Austrian club Wolfsberger AC appointed Schmid as their head coach following his spell at Austria Wien.

During his spell at Wolfsberger AC, Schmid utilised both a 3-4-1-2 and a 4-3-3 formation, the club performed well in Schmid's opening set of fixtures, however, as of December 2023 the club went on a run of just three wins in their last nine games. He left Wolfsberger AC at the end of the 2023–24 season.

Schmid was appointed head coach of Austrian Bundesliga club TSV Hartberg on 22 September 2024.

== Coaching record ==
As of 15 May 2014

Team	From	To	Record								
Team	From	To	G	W	D	L	GF	GA	GD	Win %	Ref.
Schwanenstadt	22 January 2008	30 June 2008	12	4	2	6	14	17	−3	33.33	
WAC			44	17	14	13					
Total			12	4	2	6	14	17	−3	33.33	—
