= Spusu =

Mobile Virtual Network Operator

spusu

spusu (from the German sprich und surf, "speak and surf") is a Mobile Virtual Network Operator (MVNO) belonging to MASS Response Service.

Launched in 2015 in Austria (on the 3 network), since 2020 it has been offering its telecommunications services in Italy (on the Wind Tre network), since 2023 also in the United Kingdom (on the EE network), and since 2024 in Switzerland (on the Salt Mobile network).

In Lower Austria and Burgenland it operates a 5G network with its own frequencies. According to its own data, in 2017 the operator had over 100,000 customers, at the beginning of 2020 around 300,000 customers under contract, and at the beginning of 2023 over 500,000 customers. The dialing code in Austria is 0670.

== Awards ==
In the 2016 survey conducted by the Society for Consumer Studies (ÖGVS), in which a total of 23 mobile phone providers were tested, spusu achieved first place in the "Conditions" category. The provider, which was still young at the time, took third place in the overall ranking.

In 2017, spusu was named test winner by the Society for Consumption Studies (ÖGVS). Out of 21 mobile phone providers tested, spusu took first place in the categories of conditions and customer service and thus achieved overall victory.

== EU roaming ==
Since June 15, 2017, network operators from the EU or EEA have been obliged to no longer charge their customers roaming surcharges within a fair use limit. However, the EU roaming regulation provides for the possibility of exceptions for mobile phone providers if the EU roaming requirements lead to negative contribution margins that threaten their existence and thus endanger the sustainability of the domestic charging model. The state-run Rundfunk- und Telekom Regulierungs-GmbH approved spusu such an exception for one year in October 2017 and granted it again for another year in October 2018. Despite being exempt from the obligation to provide customers with free roaming, the mobile operator granted its customers free telephony and SMS roaming within the EU/EEA area as well as limited data roaming (between 500 and 1,000 megabytes per month, depending on the tariff). Regardless, since April 1, 2019, data roaming as defined by the EU has been granted in full with all current tariffs. In addition to old tariffs, the only exceptions are data tariffs that are generally offered without roaming.

== Sponsorship ==
Between 2017 and 2021, spusu was the main and title sponsor of the Handball League Austria. Since 2018 it has been the main sponsor of SKN St. Pölten and FC Mistelbach as well as the Vienna Capitals.

spusu has also been a sponsor of SK Rapid Vienna since 2022.

== Advertising ==
In September 2018, spusu announced that former Austrian football player Hans Krankl would act as a testimonial for the mobile phone provider and will be featured on the brand's online, TV and print advertising materials in the future. He replaces the active football coach Dietmar Kühbauer as the brand's previous advertising face.

Toni Polster serves as the advertising face for the spusu e-bikes. Harry Prünster serves as the advertising face for spusu wine.
