= WSG Tirol =

Association football club in Austria

- Full name: Wattener Sportgemeinschaft Tirol
- Founded: 1930; 96 years ago
- Ground: Tivoli Stadion Tirol, Innsbruck
- Capacity: 16,008
- President: Diana Langes-Swarovski
- Manager: Philipp Semlic
- League: Austrian Bundesliga
- 2025–26: Austrian Bundesliga, 11th of 12
- Website: www.wsg-fussball.at
Home colours	Away colours

Wattener Sportgemeinschaft Tirol (lit. 'Wattens' Sports Community Tyrol'), commonly known as WSG Tirol, is a professional association football club based in the town of Wattens, Tyrol, Austria, that competes in the Austrian Football Bundesliga, the top tier of the Austrian football league system. Founded in 1930, it is affiliated to the Tirol Football Association. The team plays its home matches at Tivoli Stadion Tirol, where it has been based since 2019. In the 1969–70 season they played in the Nationalliga, the highest division in Austrian football at this time.

== History ==
The club was formed in 1930 and has been known as SC Wattens (1930–53), SV Wattens (1953–71), and WSG Wattens (1984–2019). Its most successful period was in 1968–71, when it competed in the Austrian Bundesliga. Between 1971 and 1984 it merged with FC Wacker Innsbruck to form SSW Innsbruck (the merged team went on to win the Bundesliga five times and reached the quarter-finals of the 1977-78 European Cup). In this period the club retained its identity with distinct youth teams. From 1984, WSG Wattens have played in the Austrian Regional League West and the second tier First League.

In 2019, they were promoted to the Bundesliga. After promotion, the club announced that their name would be changed to WSG Swarowski Tirol. In 2021 however, Swarovski ended its sponsorship and its name was removed from the club's name as well as from the business.

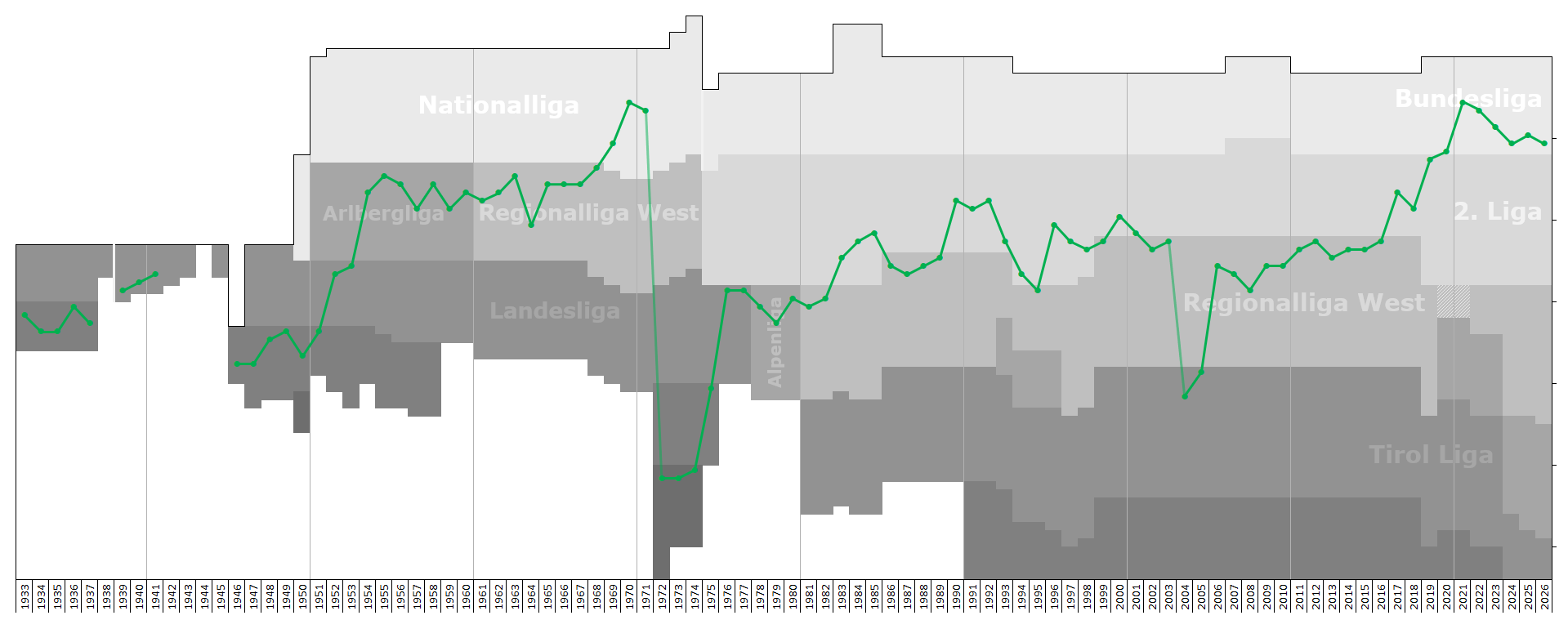
Historical chart of Wattens league performance

== Stadium ==
WSG Tirol play their home matches in Gernot Langes Stadion, Wattens. The stadium's capacity is 5500. The team's average home attendance for the 2010–11 season was 289. The stadium is also occasionally used for international matches, such as a 2010 friendly between Saudi Arabia and Nigeria.

In 2013 the stadium was renamed in Gernot Langes stadium in honour of the 70th birthday of the longtime president Gernot Langes.

The stadium does not currently meet Bundesliga suitability criteria and therefore redevelopment work has been planned to create a modern, 6,000 capacity stadium by the summer of 2023. During this period, the club will use the Tivoli Stadium in Innsbruck.

== Honours ==
- Austrian Second Division:
  - Winners (1): 2018–19
- Austrian Second Division (West):
  - Winners (1): 1968
- Austrian Third Division (West):
  - Winners (4): 1989, 1995, 1999, 2003, 2016

== Current squad ==
As of 8 September 2026

Note: Flags indicate national team as defined under FIFA eligibility rules; some limited exceptions apply. Players may hold more than one non-FIFA nationality.

No.	Pos.	Nation	Player
1	GK	BIH	Salko Hamzić
3	DF	AUT	David Gugganig
5	DF	USA	Drew Murray
6	MF	AUT	Marc Striednig
7	FW	USA	Quincy Butler
8	FW	DEN	Nikolai Baden Frederiksen
10	FW	AUT	Thomas Sabitzer
11	MF	AUT	Murat Satin
13	GK	AUT	Alexander Eckmayr
14	DF	GER	David Kubatta
15	MF	BFA	Mazou Bambara
16	FW	AUT	Lukas Hinterseer
17	FW	ENG	Michael Olakigbe (on loan from Brentford)

No.	Pos.	Nation	Player
18	MF	AUT	Husein Balić
22	MF	AUT	David Falkner
23	DF	CRO	Marco Boras
27	DF	AUT	David Jaunegg
28	MF	AUT	Moritz Oswald (on loan from Rapid Wien)
30	MF	AUT	Matthäus Taferner
31	DF	AUT	Michael Neuner
32	MF	AUT	Raphael Gschösser
34	GK	AUT	Felix Libiseller
35	GK	AUT	Julian Margreiter
36	FW	AUT	Thomas Goiginger
37	FW	AUT	Moritz Wels
43	MF	AUT	Nemanja Čelić

=== Out on loan ===
Note: Flags indicate national team as defined under FIFA eligibility rules; some limited exceptions apply. Players may hold more than one non-FIFA nationality.

No. / Pos. / Nation / Player; — / DF / AUT / Lukas Schweighofer (at Austria Salzburg until 30 June 2027)	No. / Pos. / Nation / Player; — / MF / AUT / Christian Huetz (at Austria Salzburg until 30 June 2027)

== Club Officials ==
Position	Staff
Manager	(Austria) Philipp Semlic
Assistant Manager	(Czech Republic) Martin Švejnoha (Austria) Manuel Ludwiger
Goalkeeper Coach	(Austria) Mischa Todeschini (Austria) Ferdinand Oswald
Athletic and Rehabilitation Coach	(Austria) Michael Öhlknecht
Video Analyst	(Austria) Sebastian Ungerank
Team Doctor	(Austria) Gregor Unterberger (Austria) Clemens Burgstaller
Physiotherapist	(Austria) Anja Pölzl (Austria) Patrick Grassnig
Team Manager	(Austria) Stefan Köck
Kitman	(Germany) Matthias Peters
Busdriver	(Austria) Servet Sisman

== Manager history ==
- (Austria) Fritz Pfister (1964–1970)
- (Austria) Eduard Frühwirth (1970–1971)
- (Austria) Hugo Perwein (1989–1990)
- (Austria) Günther Rinker (1991–1994)
- (Austria) Friedrich Peer (1994–1997)
- (Austria) Wolfgang Schwarz (1997–2000)
- (Austria) Günther Steinlechner (2000–2001)
- (Bosnia and Herzegovina) Fuad Đulić (2001)
- (Austria) Michael Streiter (2001–2002)
- (Austria) Georg Saringer (2005)
- (Austria) Thomas Pfeiler (2006–2007)
- (Austria) Klaus Schuster (2007)
- (Austria) Robert Auer (2007–2008)
- (Austria) Roland Kirchler (2008–2012)
- (Austria) Robert Wazinger (2012–2013)
- (Austria) Thomas Silberberger (2013-2024)
- (Austria) Philipp Semlic (2024-)

== Logos ==
Club Logo until 1971

WSG Swarovski Tirol logo 2019–2021

Club logo as WSG Tirol since 2021

== See also ==
- Football in Austria
- Austrian Football First League
