= Zipf Brewery =

Austrian brewery

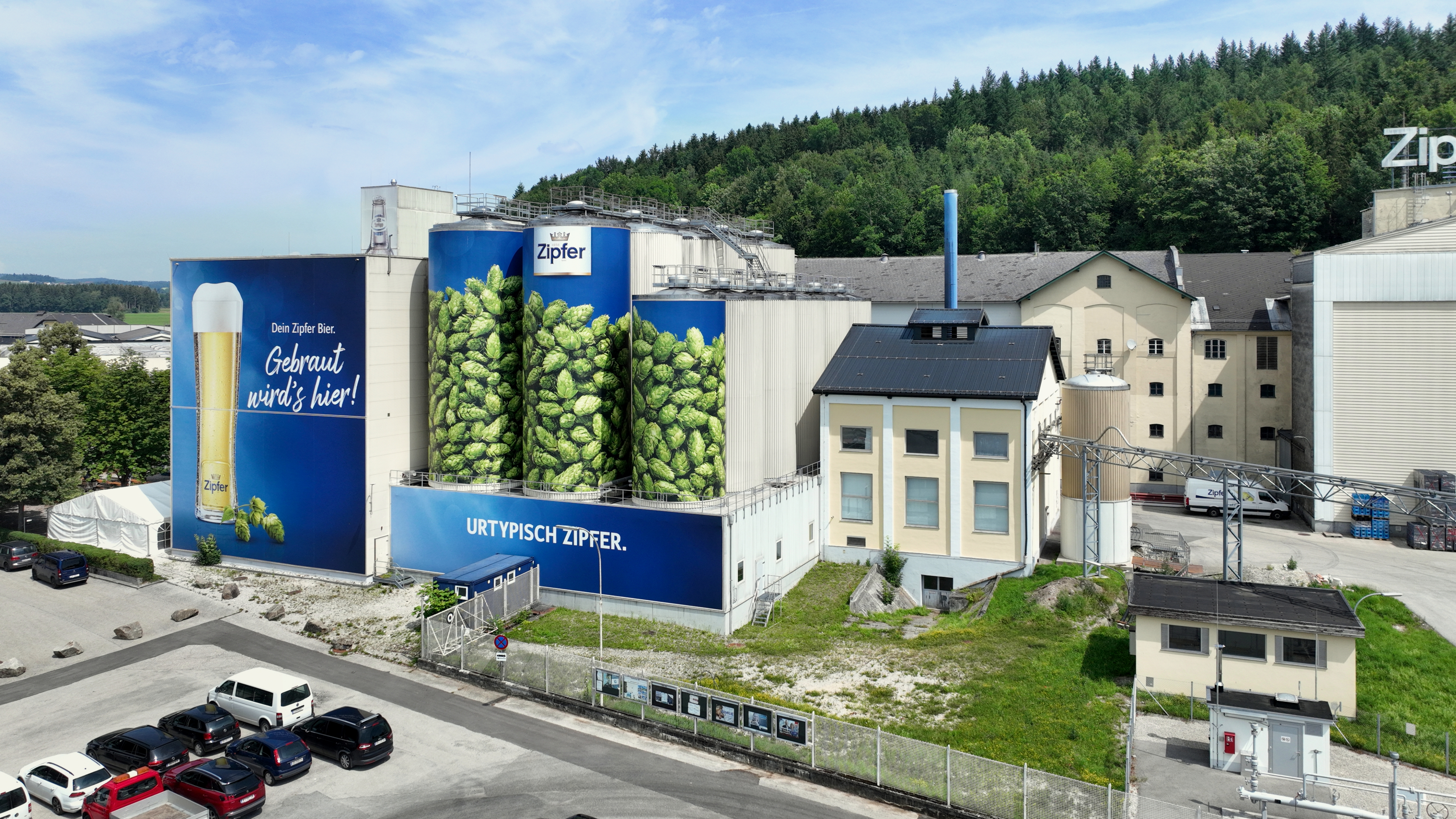
Partial view of the Zipf Brewery.

The Zipf Brewery (in German: Brauerei Zipf) is a brewery in the Upper Austrian municipality of Neukirchen an der Vöckla (Vöcklabruck District). It is named after its location in the Zipf division and is part of Brau Union Österreich AG, the majority of whose shares are owned by Heineken.

== History ==
In 1842, Friedrich Hofmann began brewing his own beer in a small brewery with an adjoining pub in Zipf, Upper Austria, and selling it to other pubs in the area. With the expansion of the railroad network, the urban breweries expanded their delivery area into the countryside. Financial difficulties and a forced auction of the brewery in 1858 were the consequences.

At the forced auction on July 20, 1858, the Viennese banker Franz Schaup bought the brewery premises for a purchase price of 19,500 gulden. This day is still considered the official date of foundation.

As part of the so-called Hofmann reality, the small brewery was expanded by Schaup. He had cellars dug into the mountain north of the brewery and equipped the brewhouse and malt house with a steam engine. Within five years, Schaup managed to increase the annual output from 1,542 hectoliters (hl) to 14,206 hl. In 1864, Franz Schaup bequeathed the brewery to his son Wilhelm Schaup. Before the turn of the century, he expanded his legacy into an industrial brewery. This was characterized above all by artificial cooling, the connection to today's Austria's western railway, and the introduction of a company health insurance fund and the opening of the company hospital. After his death in 1899, Wilhelm Schaup left behind a modern brewery with an annual output of 120,000 hl. Management passed to his two sons-in-law Richard Kretz and Max Limbeck-Lilienau.

=== First World War ===
The company's rise was abruptly interrupted by the First World War. In 1917, a low point was reached with an output of only 14,000 hl. The devaluation of the currency made it necessary to convert the company into a stock corporation - the "Brauerei Zipf AG vormals Wilhelm Schaup" - on January 1, 1921. The predecessor bank of Creditanstalt and the Göss brewery were added as financially strong partners. Together they held 45% of the share capital. The remaining 55% remained in family ownership. The management of the company was now the responsibility of a board of directors, which was strongly influenced by the partners. As a result of the stock market crash of 1929, Creditanstalt's minority shareholding passed to Continentale Gesellschaft für Bank-und Industriewerte in Basel, until it was finally taken over by Braubank AG in 1935.

=== Anschluss ===
Although the Anschluss to the German Reich initially led to a phase of upswing, the brewing industry was also affected by the control of raw material supplies as early as 1940–1941. Soon, a sufficient supply in terms of volume was only possible by reducing the original gravity. In 1943, the brewery's underground cellar facilities, operating equipment and workshops were confiscated for the construction of the Redl-Zipf subcamp. The camp prisoners worked on the construction of engines for the V2 rocket. In the last year of the war, the brewery finally came to a complete standstill.

=== After the Second World War ===
After the end of World War II, Fritz Kretz - great-grandson of the brewery's founder - initially took over the management of the disused brewery alone and brewed the first post-war Zipfer beer in February 1946. In the mid-1950s, Kretz and his nephew Gottfried Nüchtern laid the foundations for the brewery's rise from 0 hectoliters produced in 1945 to almost 1,000,000 hl in the mid-1990s. A decisive factor in this development was the early focus on the production of specialty beers - from "Zipfer Spezial" to "Zipfer Urhell" to "Zipfer Urtyp".

=== Merger with Österreichische Brau AG ===
On January 1, 1970, the Zipf brewery merged with Brau AG. Since 1993 Österreichische Brau AG, together with Steirerbrau and other foreign sister companies, has been an equal subsidiary of Brau-Union. Following a decision in the spring of 1997, Österreichische Brau AG and Steirerbrau merged to form Brau Union Österreich on January 1, 1998.

=== Merger with the Heineken Group ===
In 2003, the international group Heineken merged with the Austrian market leader Brau Union. The Heineken Group, which owns more than 100 beer brands worldwide, has since held the majority of shares in some of the best-known Austrian beer brands, including Zipfer. One of the corporate guidelines of the second-largest brewery group is to leave the brewing sites, raw materials and beer recipes untouched. The influence of the majority owner is mainly reflected in marketing and communication measures.

== Literature ==
- Stephanie Kretz: Die Kraft der Marke Zipfer. Service Fachverlag an der Wirtschaftsuniversität Wien, Wien 1999, S. 1–148 (PDF auf wu.ac.at).
- Simone Fröschl: Gesellschaftlicher Wandel und neue Zielgruppe. Frauen und Bierwerbung am Beispiel „Zipfer Sparkling“. Diplomarbeite, Wien 2003, 221 Blatt.
- Sabine Kiesenhofer: Wie Marken von Konsumenten wahrgenommen werden, am Beispiel der Einzelmarken Gösser und Zipfer der Brau Union Österreich AG. Masterarbeit, Steyr 2013, 152 Blatt.
- Stefan Wedrac: Die Brauerei Zipf im Nationalsozialismus: Ein österreichisches Brauunternehmen zwischen V2-Rüstungsbetrieb, KZ-Außenlager und NS-Kriegswirtschaft. Vandenhoeck & Ruprecht, 2021, ISBN 978-3-205-21360-4
