= Gebrüder Weiss =

Austrian transport and logistics company

- Native name: Gebrüder Weiss GmbH
- Industry: Transport & Logistics
- Founded: 1823 (as Gebrüder Weiss)
- Headquarters: Bundesstraße 110, A-6923 Lauterach, Austria
- Number of locations: 180 (2025)
- Key people: Wolfram Senger-Weiss (CEO); Jürgen Bauer; Alessandro Cacciola; Peter Schafleitner
- Revenue: 2,72 billion € (2025)
- Number of employees: 8,600 (2025)
- Website: www.gw-world.com

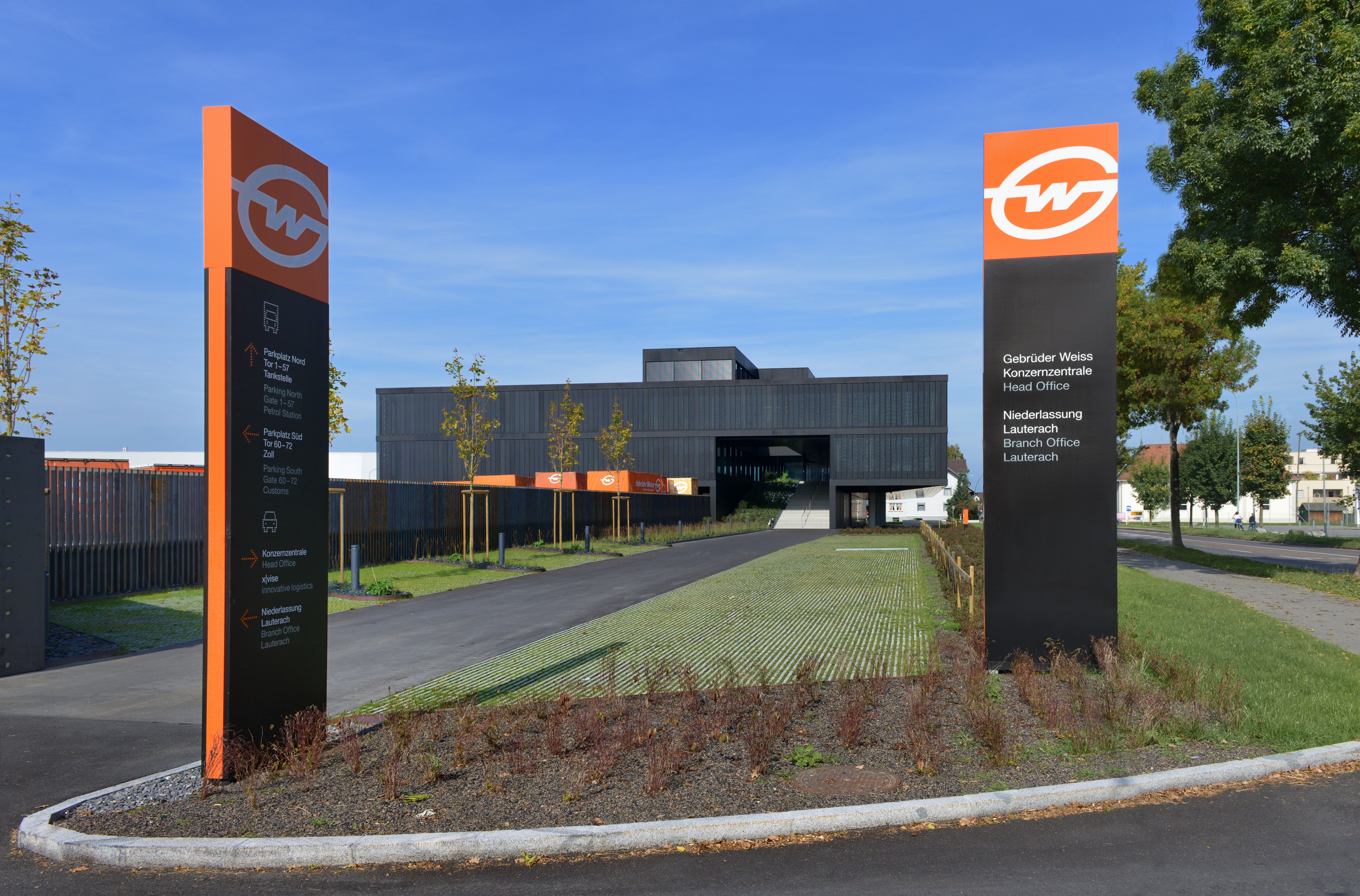
Gebrüder Weiss GmbH Lauterach

Gebrüder Weiss GmbH is an international transport and logistics company specializing in land, sea, and air freight, headquartered in Lauterach, Austria, with around 180 locations worldwide. In addition to transport and logistics services, the company also offers digital services as well as supply chain management solutions. Gebrüder Weiss can trace their history in the transport industry back over 500 years and, as such, is one of the oldest transport and logistics companies in the world. In total, around 8,600 employees (as of 2025) work for the company. In 2025, the annual turnover was 2.73 billion euros.

== History ==
=== Background ===
The Gebrüder Weiss roots can be traced back more than 500 years. Ancestors of the Senger-Weiss family, connected the trading centers of Milan and Lindau, known as the Lindau Messenger. When the old route through the Via Mala gorge was expanded, the Lindau Messenger (also referred to as the Milan Messenger) became a regular service – established by Hans Spehler in 1487. The route ran from Lindau via Fussach and Chur, across the 2100-meter-high Splügen Pass to Lake Como and on to Milan.

For centuries, the Lindau Messenger was one of the most important services on the transalpine north–south axis. The Messenger used various methods to transport technical goods, money, silk or food: boats for Lake Constance and Lake Como, horses for the flatter sections and mules for the mountainous ones along the Via Mala. The Lindau Messenger also carried or escorted people across the Alps, one of the most famous passengers being Johann Wolfgang von Goethe. The poet took advantage of the Messenger service on his way back from Italy in 1788.

Due to broader social developments at this time and emerging industrialization, the Lindauer Messenger's future prospects became increasingly limited. For this reason, in 1781 Johann Kasimir Weiss joined forces with the Fußach trading post. The post, under Johann Schneider, (Weiss's uncle by marriage to Ursula Schneider, née Spehler), no longer carried out transports directly, but was involved in organizing them. This can be seen as the precursor of a modern logistics terminal, which is concerned with the consolidation of goods flows. The trading office served as a central point for interim storage and the management of messenger services, but increasingly also for the transport needs of the then emerging Vorarlberg textile industry. The trading post operated on behalf of the Lindau Chamber of Commerce and expanded its services in the following years in parallel with the rapidly growing regional textile industry.

=== Founding ===
When the last managing director of the trading post from the Schneider family died without direct descendants in 1822, the business passed into the sole ownership of Josef Weiss (eldest son of Johann Kasimir Weiss). Together with his two half-brothers, Leonhard, and Johann Alois Karl Weiss, he continued the company and renamed it Gebrüder Weiss in 1823. After Leonhard Weiss died without children in 1832 and following the deaths of Josef Weiss (1845) and his son Josef Anton Weiss (1862), the company became the sole property of Johann Alois Karl Weiss. After his death in 1868, his sons Eduard and Ferdinand Weiss took over the business, although Eduard left the freight forwarding company in 1876. One of their first official acts was relocating the company headquarters from Fußach to Bregenz on July 1, 1872.

=== First expansion during industrialization ===
During the Industrial Revolution, the demand for raw materials and the volume of transported goods increased drastically. To secure the supply of commodities such as cotton, textile companies in Vorarlberg founded their own trading firms in key transshipment hubs or took stakes in existing ones. Freight forwarding companies – among them Gebrüder Weiss – handled transportation and established their own networks and partnerships in relevant international markets. This included opening branches in Mediterranean ports. Gebrüder Weiss established its first such branch around 1875 in Trieste, then part of the Austro-Hungarian Empire. On July 4, 1877, the company founded Fratelli Weiss, Selmer & Gerhardt in Venice. Further branches followed in Genoa (1882) and Gorizia (1896). In its core market of Vorarlberg, the company expanded with new locations in Feldkirch and Bludenz (1884), and in Dornbirn during the 1890s. From 1890 onward, Gebrüder Weiss also established its first offices in Switzerland (in Romanshorn, Buchs, and St. Margrethen). With the acquisition of Schubert & Vöth, the company strengthened its activities in Vienna. In 1906, Anton Weiss took over the management following the death of his father Ferdinand. He was later supported by his brother-in-law Adolf Jerie, who was responsible for operations in Vienna.

=== Transformation of business activities since 1900 ===
With the onset of World War I, the company's expansion phase came to an end. In 1910, the Fratelli Weiss branches in Venice and Genoa were sold to an Italian freight forwarder. Additionally, at the outbreak of the war, many employees, including managing director Anton Weiss, had to serve in the military. After the war, inflation in Austria escalated to hyperinflation in the summer of 1921, and Gebrüder Weiss's order volume dropped significantly. In the same year, Adolf Jerie and Ferdinand, son of Anton, took over management. However, Adolf Jerie died two years later, leaving Ferdinand Weiss, then only 23 years old, as sole managing director. Despite the Great Depression and a decline in customer orders, the company expanded its network again in 1932 with the establishment of a branch in Hamburg. Connections to all major Austrian cities and European economic centers followed. In 1935, Gebrüder Weiss took over the Austrian agency of the Bavarian Lloyds in Regensburg and entered the Danube shipping business. It was also during this time that the company adopted the color orange for its trucks. According to company lore, a truck needed urgently for a customer order was only coated with orange rust protection paint but was nevertheless used. Ferdinand Weiss decided to keep this eye-catching color as the company's standard truck color.

=== Second expansion in Austria ===
The demand for freight forwarding services was high shortly after the war's end to support supply and reconstruction efforts. Gebrüder Weiss in Vorarlberg could rely on mostly intact facilities. An order from Caritas to deliver so-called CARE packages allowed the company started expanding into rebuild its business activities in the early post-war years. By 1947, revenues had nearly doubled, and new trucks were acquired, laying the foundation for further growth. From 1950 onwards, the company entered a new expansion phase in Austria, opening new branches in Innsbruck, Graz, and Linz. After Ferdinand Weiss's death (1968), his daughter Heidegunde Senger-Weiss (Heidi) and her husband Paul Senger-Weiss took over management. In 1988, the parcel service APS Austria Paket System (today DPD Austria) was founded together with two Austrian partners, Lagermax and Schachinger. In 1972, the general partnership (OHG) was converted into a GmbH, and the partnership agreement from 1921 was replaced by modern corporate regulations.

=== Global expansion ===
Following the fall of the Iron Curtain, Gebrüder Weiss expanded in 1989 into neighboring Central and Eastern European countries, beginning with Hungary and the Czech Republic (1990). Branches were then established in Slovakia, Croatia, and Serbia. The expansion strategy ultimately led to the company entering the markets of Romania and Bulgaria in 2000, extending Gebrüder Weiss's core region to the Black Sea. In subsequent years, all the other countries along the Black Sea coast, including Bosnia and Herzegovina, Montenegro, North Macedonia, and Ukraine, became part of the network.

Since the early 2000s, Gebrüder Weiss has expanded its network along the New Silk Road, in Central Asian countries up to China. From there, the company organizes direct connections between Europe and Asia as well as transport within and between Central Asian countries. So ist der Konzern seit 2007 in Almaty, Kasachstan tätig. Since 2007, the company has been active in Almaty, Kazakhstan. Further expansions followed in Armenia, Uzbekistan, Russia, and Turkey. In 2012, Gebrüder Weiss established a logistics terminal in Tbilisi, Georgia, as part of its expansion along the New Silk Road. The Tbilisi location was developed into a central hub for goods transport between Europe and Central Asia and expanded as a logistics center. In Germany, Gebrüder Weiss took over the forwarding company Diehl in Baden-Württemberg completely.

At the beginning of 2009, Gebrüder Weiss took over the land and logistics operations of Hellmann Worldwide in the Czech Republic. In the 2011 fiscal year, the company exceeded €1 billion in revenue for the first time in its history. In 2014, Gebrüder Weiss moved into its new corporate headquarters in Lauterach. In China, the company founded a joint venture with Jilin International Transport Corporation (JIT) focusing on automotive logistics. In 2017, the company established its own national organization in the US with locations in Chicago, New York, Atlanta, Boston, Dallas, and Los Angeles. In 2019, Wolfram Senger-Weiss became chairman of the management board, after 14 years of leadership by a non-family member.

=== COVID-19 pandemic ===
During the COVID-19 pandemic, Gebrüder Weiss accelerated its digital transformation by launching the new customer portal myGW. This online platform provides direct access to all services and delivers real-time information on transport and logistics orders. With the acquisition of the Bremen-based freight forwarder Ipsen Logistics, the company strengthened its air and sea freight network in Germany and entered the markets in Poland and Malaysia. In the same year, Gebrüder Weiss also expanded into South Korea, Australia, and New Zealand. By then, the international network comprised 170 locations across nearly three dozen countries. In total, the company invested more than €70 million in 2020 to expand its branch network, IT infrastructure, and acquisitions. In 2022, the company generated annual revenues of approximately €3.7 billion.

=== Further development ===
In 2022, the company invested €67 million to expand its global network, particularly in Germany, Hungary, Romania, the US, Turkey, and Georgia with the latter two serving as key hubs for transport routes to Central Asia and China along the New Silk Road. By the end of 2022, the company employed approximately 8,400 people.

In early 2023, Gebrüder Weiss completed the rebranding of the Bavarian freight forwarder Lode to Gebrüder Weiss Waldkraiburg and took over the freight company Rentschler in Baden-Württemberg. Additionally, the company acquired B+A Luft- und Seefrachtspedition in Nuremberg, Spedition Wedlich in Bayreuth, and the Konradsreuth branch from Spedition Amm. That same year, Gebrüder Weiss opened a new logistics terminal in Reutte, Austria, to serve local businesses in Tyrol. Around €8 million was invested in the facility, which complements the company's existing branches in Innsbruck, Wörgl, and Hall in Tyrol. These acquisitions and expansions further strengthened the company's domestic road freight network in Austria and Germany.

In its global network, Gebrüder Weiss opened a new location in Albania, closing the geographical gap between Montenegro and North Macedonia and expanding its transport connections in Southeast Europe. In October 2023, the company also opened a location in Laredo, USA – the largest transhipment hub for Mexican imports. The Laredo branch became the company's tenth U.S. location, following sites in Chicago (headquarters), Atlanta, Boston, Dallas, El Paso, Los Angeles, Miami, New York, and San Francisco.

In October 2023, Heidegunde Senger-Weiss, co-partner and former managing director of the company, passed away. Together with her husband, she led Gebrüder Weiss from 1968 to 2004 and later served on the supervisory board from 2005 to 2017.

In 2024, Gebrüder Weiss opened a new logistics center in Straubing, Bavaria. The official opening was attended by, among others, the Bavarian Minister President Markus Söder.

At the company's location in Wolfurt, Vorarlberg, the ground-breaking ceremony for a new IT and logistics center also took place. The 30,000 square meter facility will include a high-bay warehouse, a manual warehouse, and an office building for the IT department. The completion of the company's largest construction project to date is planned for the end of 2025.

In July 2025, Peter Kloiber retired after 28 years on the executive board. Peter Schafleitner, previously Director of Product Management for Land Transport, was promoted to the executive board.

Throughout 2025, Gebrüder Weiss opened subsidiaries in Thailand and the Philippines. With this market entry, Gebrüder Weiss is now active in ten countries across East and Southeast Asia and Oceania. These include Australia, Greater China, Japan, Malaysia, New Zealand, Singapore, South Korea, Thailand, and Vietnam.

In January 2026, Gebrüder Weiss acquired a majority stake in the Istanbul-based logistics service provider Sienzi Lojistik. Since then, the company has been operating under the name "Sienzi Lojistik – a Company of Gebrüder Weiss" and remains an independent entity. This investment expands the company's market presence in Turkey.

Effective January 1, 2026, the Gebrüder Weiss representative office in Tashkent was converted into an independent country organization.

In early March 2026, Alessandro Cacciola was acquired as head of the Air & Sea area, succeeding Lothar Thoma, who announced his departure from the logistics industry after some 40 years.

== Locations ==
Gebrüder Weiss operates 180 company-owned locations worldwide across 34 countries. The company's network covers the following regions:

- Locations in Eastern and Southeastern Europe from Austria to the Black Sea: Albania, Bosnia and Herzegovina, Bulgaria, Croatia, Montenegro, North Macedonia, Poland, Romania, Serbia, Slovakia, Slovenia, Czech Republic, Ukraine, Hungary
- Locations along the New Silk Road: Armenia, China, Georgia, Kazakhstan, Taiwan, Turkey, and Uzbekistan
- Locations in North America: USA and Canada
- Locations in Central Europe: Austria, Germany, and Switzerland, and
- Locations in Southeast Asia: Australia, Japan, Malaysia, New Zealand, Singapore, South Korea, Vietnam, and Thailand.

== Controversy ==
In late 2019, a conflict arose over the expansion of the Gebrüder Weiss freight forwarding company in the Schallmoos, Salzburg, district. To make way for the expansion plans, parts of the marshland in Schallmoos — which, in its original form, gave the district its name — were to be drained and cleared. Construction work began in February 2020, even as the Nature Conservation Union was pursuing an ongoing appeal with the Provincial Administrative Court. It was dismissed as inadmissible. In April 2020, the Salzburg City Council finally approved the facility expansion project.

== Sustainable engagement ==
Since 2011, Gebrüder Weiss has operated its own wind farm in northern Germany. In addition, photovoltaic systems are deployed at various logistics locations. Both new buildings and existing facilities are gradually being equipped with the appropriate technology. In 2024, the number of photovoltaic systems in the DACH region and Eastern Europe increased from 27 to 34. The total amount of electricity generated was 12,699 megawatt hours, which covered about half of the total electricity demand of all company locations worldwide.

In land transport, Gebrüder Weiss is deploying alternative drive technologies. Since 2021, a hydrogen-powered truck has been in operation in Switzerland. Electric trucks and vans are deployed in Austria, Germany, Hungary, Romania, and Croatia, primarily for less-than-truckload (LTL) transport, line-haul services, and final-mile deliveries. In certain regions, alternative delivery solutions complement the existing logistics strategy. On the Croatian islands of Rab and Lošinj, as well as in Lauterach in Vorarlberg, Austria, electric tricycles are used to deliver goods locally.

Gebrüder Weiss supported, as a logistics partner and main sponsor, the Gebrüder Weiss Peak Evolution Team at Ojos del Salado in Chile, which aimed to set a world attitude record for electric vehicles. To this end the team converted a diesel-based vehicle from Aebi Schmidt into a solar-powered truck called "Terren". Gebrüder Weiss was responsible, among other things, for planning the shipment of the vehicle from Switzerland to Chile. In December 2023, the team reached an altitude record for street-legal electric vehicles at around 6,500 meter.

== Digital services and supply chain management ==
The "myGW" platform serves as a central hub for shippers and their customers, facilitating the electronic booking system, the management of digitized documents, and communication. It also provides direct access to all services and delivers real-time information on transport and logistics orders. In the same year, the platform was awarded the Hermes Transport.Logistics Award by the Austrian Federal Economic Chamber. One year after its launch, approximately 14,500 customers in 19 countries were using the platform. In its fifth year, the platform had over 25,000 active users.

In addition, Gebrüder Weiss carries out projects in the field of supply chain management by monitoring, managing, and controlling its customers' supply chains. The goal is to make them more efficient and sustainable. For example, Gebrüder Weiss developed the Control Tower – a monitoring and evaluation system – for the Liechtenstein-based construction technology group Hilti. This includes a personalized dashboard that provides data, key business indicators, and events throughout the entire supply chain. For the core concept of the Hilti Control Tower, Gebrüder Weiss received a Supply Chain Excellence Award from Translog Connect in Budapest in 2013.

== Awards ==
- 2003: Award WU-Manager of the Year for Heidi and Paul Senger-Weiss,
- 2008: Austrian State Prize for the environmentally friendly block train OCC,
- 2010: GRI quality seal for the first sustainability report from a logistics company,
- 2013: Supply Chain Excellence Award from Translog Connect in Budapest,
- 2014: Four special stamps issued commemorating the historic Landau Messenger service and thus of the early history of Gebrüder Weiss,
- 2014, 2019, 2020: Best of Content Marketing Award for the Gebrüder Weiss customer magazine Atlas,
- 2015: Introduction of Heidi Senger-Weiss into the Logistics Hall of Fame,
- 2015: German Prize for Online Communication for the game app Logistics Expert,
- 2018: Red Dot Design Award for the Gebrüder Weiss yearbook 2017,
- 2020: Export prize winner in the Transport and Traffic category of the Austrian Chamber of Commerce,
- 2021: Award Hermes.Traffic.Logistics.Prize of the Austrian Chamber of Commerce,
- 2023: Austrian State Prize PR in the category of product and service PR,
- 2023: Award Hermes.Wirtschafts.Prize of the Hermes Economic Forum and Austrian newspaper Kurier,
- 2023: Award for the logistics brand of 2023 from the trade newspaper "Verkehr",
- 2025: Red Dot Design Award for the Gebrüder Weiss customer magazine ATLAS (issue "Material").
- 2026: Creditreform credit rating certificate with a credit rating index of 173 points.
- 2026: EcoVadis Gold Status with a sustainability rating of 85 out of 100 points.
