= Kleine Zeitung =

Austrian daily newspaper

- Type: Daily newspaper
- Format: Berliner
- Owner(s): Styria Media Group
- Founded: 22 November 1904; 120 years ago
- Political alignment: Center right
- Headquarters: Graz, Klagenfurt
- Country: Austria
- Circulation: 347,000 (2013)
- Website: www.kleinezeitung.at

Kleine Zeitung (German: [ˈklaɪnə ˈtsaɪtʊŋ]; lit. 'Small Newspaper') is an Austrian newspaper based in Graz and Klagenfurt. As the largest regional newspaper in Austria, covering the federal states Styria and Carinthia with East Tyrol, the paper has around 800,000 readers.

== History and profile ==
Kleine Zeitung was founded in 1904 by the Katholischer Preßverein (Catholic Press Association). The first issue was published on Tuesday, 22 November 1904. The paper is based in Graz as well as in Klagenfurt. From its inception, it was designed as a paper to be read by the masses, covering general and regional news topics at a reasonable cost. The paper is owned by the Styria Media Group, which also owns the daily newspaper Die Presse. Kleine Zeitung is published in the half Berlin format.

Kleine Zeitung has a center-right political leaning. Fritz Csoklich served as the editor-in-chief of the paper for thirty years until 1994.

Kleine Zeitung is the recipient of the 2005 European Newspaper Award in the category of regional newspaper.

== Circulation ==
The circulation of Kleine Zeitung was 293,000 copies in 2001. It was the second best selling newspaper in Austria with a circulation of 295,000 copies in 2002. In 2003 it was again the second best selling newspaper in the country with a circulation of 298,000 copies. The paper had a circulation of 292,000 copies in 2004. During the third quarter of 2005 its circulation was 264,253 copies.

In 2007 Kleine Zeitung sold 306,000 copies. The paper had a circulation of 308,819 copies in 2008 and was the third most read paper in the country. Its circulation was 311,245 copies in 2009 and 313,094 copies in 2010. The paper had a circulation of 280,983 copies in 2011. Its average circulation was 347,000 copies in 2013.
