= Rauch (company) =

Austrian multinational beverage company

Rauch Fruchtsäfte GmbH & Co OG
- Type: Public company
- Industry: Beverage
- Founded: 1919
- Founder: Franz Rauch
- Headquarters: Rankweil, Austria
- Area served: Worldwide
- Key people: Jürgen Rauch (managing director)
- Products: Beverage
- Revenue: €1 billion (2020)
- Website: www.rauch.cc

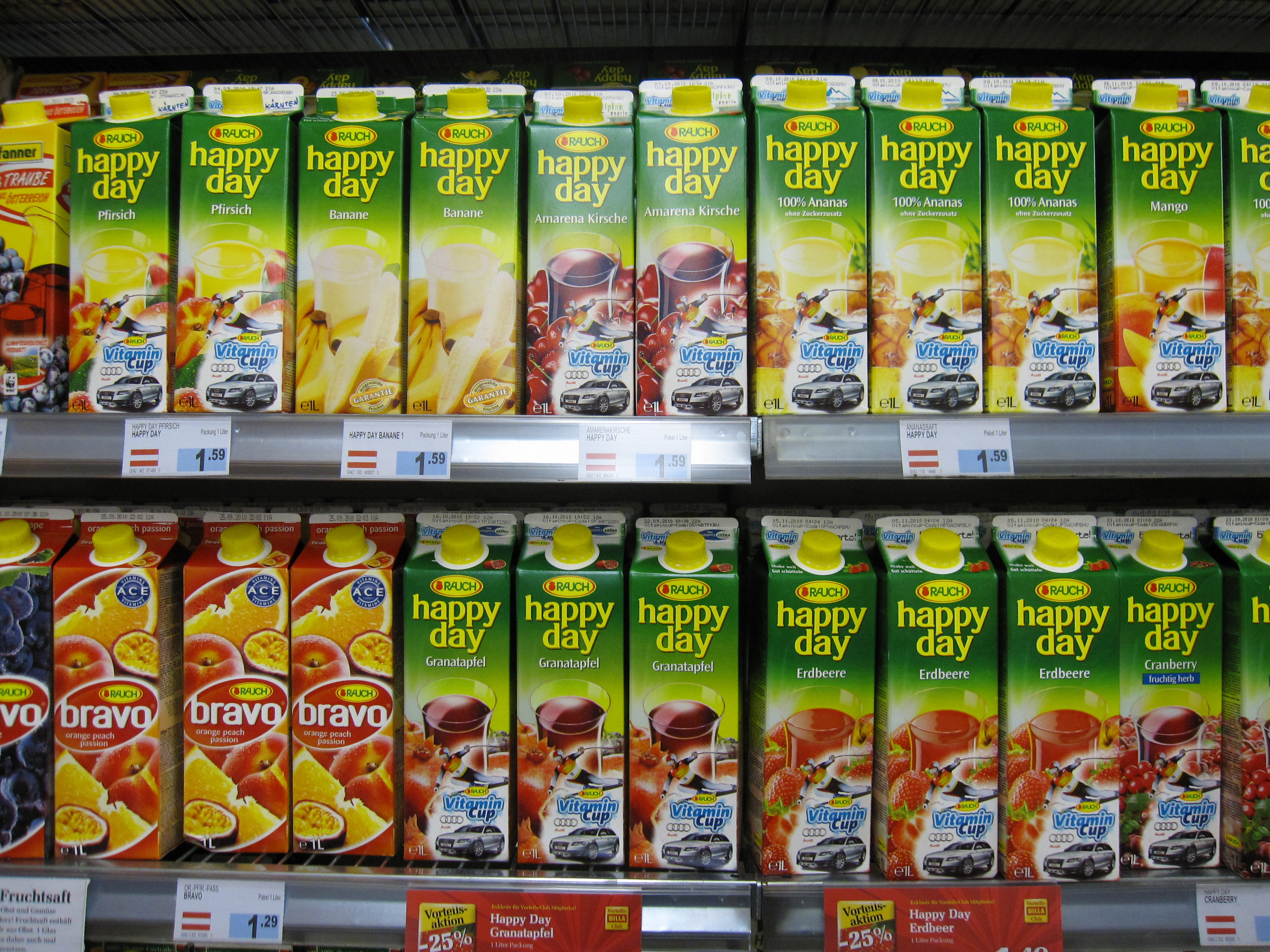
Rauch products in Austria

Rauch Fruchtsäfte GmbH & Co OG is an Austrian multinational beverage company based in Rankweil, Austria. It was founded in 1919 by Franz Rauch and has remained an Austrian family business for four generations.

The Rauch brand is particularly known for producing a range of juices and nectars, isotonic drinks, ice coffees, and ice teas, including Happy Day, Bravo, Cafemio, Juice Bar, Nativa, Istonic Sport, Willi Dungl, MyTea and Yippy. The company exports products to about 100 countries and also offers private-label production services such as Bravo sold throughout the former Yugoslavia, and Albania.

== History ==
The Austrian family business was founded by Franz Rauch in 1919 as a cider press for the surrounding farmers. In the interwar period, however, the fruit juice production was already carried out industrially. In 1962 the company was taken over by the next generation and got internationally oriented.

In the 1970s Rauch became the market leader in the Austrian market with the brands Happy Day and Bravo and sold Tetra Pak instead of glass bottles. When a campaign against smoking was launched in Austria with the slogan "Ohne Rauch geht's auch" ("it's possible without smoke"), the company Rauch created the advertising slogan "Ohne Rauch geht's nicht, wenn man denn vom Fruchtsaft spricht" ("Without smoke it is not possible, if one speaks of the fruit juice") and was thus known until the 1980s. The slogan worked because Rauch is not only the name of the company, but also means smoke in German.

In 1998 the beverage supply was also extended to ice tea. In addition, the brewery Fohrenburg was taken over in Bludenz.

On 8 June 2016 the Federal Competition Authority of Austria (BWB) announced a decision of the Cartel Court on 3 March 2016 against Rauch Fruchtsäfte GmbH & Co OG and Rauch Fruchtsäfte GmbH. Due to vertical price adjustments of final retail prices to retail customers in the period from September 2003 to March 2012, a fine of EUR 1.7 million was imposed.

In 2017 the beverage producer was honored as the "Top Brand 2017" in the fruit drinks category in Germany. It was the most successful year so far in the company's history and the company was able to increase sales by 2.4 percent from EUR 881 million to EUR 902 million.

2019 was the first year in which Rauch sales grew over EUR 1 billion, which fell by 5.3 percent to EUR 965 million in 2020, presumably due to their gastronomy partners' massive losses caused by the COVID-19 pandemic.

== Company ==
=== Business areas ===
The production covers three business areas: the actual fruit juice production, semi-manufactured products and co-packing. The products are exported to over 90 countries.

Today Rauch is the world's largest bottler of beverages for Red Bull. In 2019, Rauch and the Red Bull company revealed plans to build a canning facility in Arizona within the following five years.

Rauch also cooperates with the German Bitburger Brewery Group. As part of this cooperation since February 2008 Rauch products are distributed by Bitburger.

=== Locations ===
The company has a total of 17 locations in 12 European countries and one in North America, with each subsidiary being assigned to a respective national subsidiary of Rauch. The following production branches exist:

- Austria: Rankweil (headquarters), Nüziders
- Hungary: Budapest, Nyírmada
- Switzerland: Widnau
- Serbia: Koceljeva, Belgrade (administration)
- Bulgaria: Sofia
- Germany: Planegg
- Italy: Brianza
- Croatia: Zagreb
- Poland: Przeworsk, Płońsk, Kluczkowice-Osiedle, Siemiatycze
- Slovakia: Bratislava
- Czech Republic: Prague
- United States: Glendale

=== Sponsoring ===
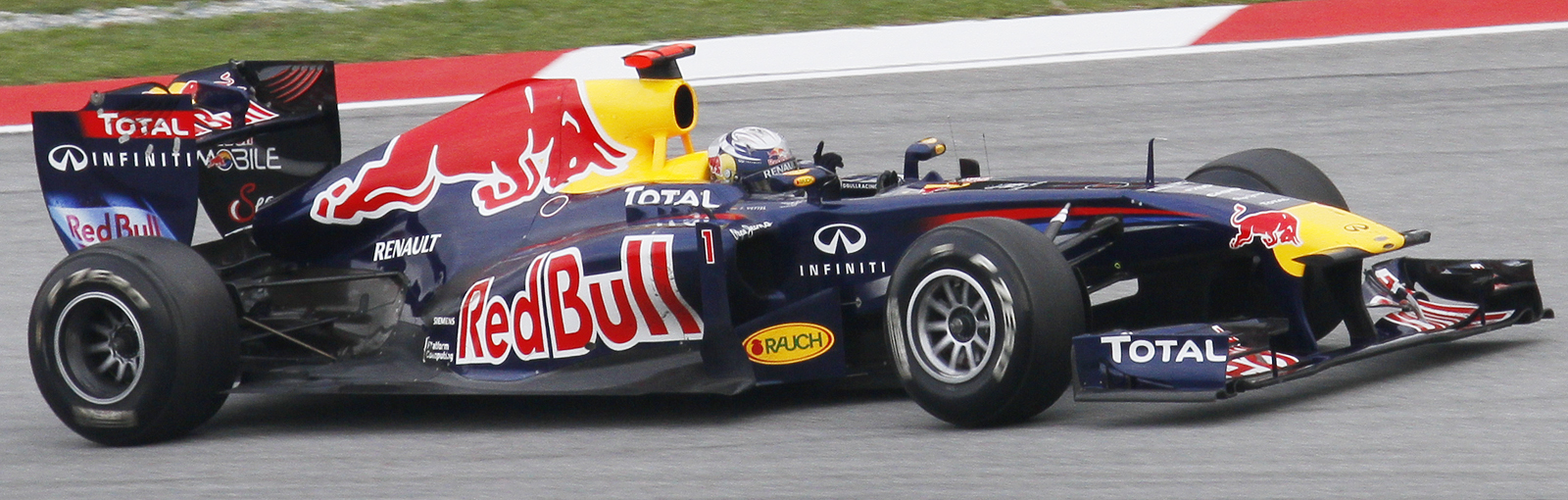
Sebastian Vettel at the Malaysian Grand Prix 2011

In ski racing, Rauch Fruchtsäfte partners with the Austrian Ski Association (ÖSV) as well as the Slovenian (Slo.Ski) and the racers Anna Veith, Katharina Liensberger and Petra Vlhová.

Rauch fruit juices supports the football clubs FC Red Bull Salzburg and in Germany since 2017 the RB Leipzig.

In cooperation with Red Bull, the Rauch logo can also be seen on the Formula 1 car from Red Bull Racing since its inaugural season.

Also, in beach volleyball, Rauch fruit juices sponsors of various events, such as the 2017 World Cup in Vienna.

== Export refunds ==
Since Commission Regulation (EC) No. 259/2008 in March 2008, recipients of the European Agricultural Guarantee Fund (EAGF) and the European Agricultural Fund for Rural Development (EAFRD) have been published on the internet. As a result, it has been announced that Rauch receives export refunds from these funds to offset the difference between world sugar prices and high EU prices (due to protective tariffs and production quotas) to remain internationally competitive. In the years 2008 to 2010, Rauch was by far the largest beneficiary of this money in Austria. Since 2011, the prices of EU sugar and the world market price are more or less balanced and compensation payments have therefore been halted.
