= 2026–27 SK Sturm Graz season =

SK Sturm Graz
2026–27 season
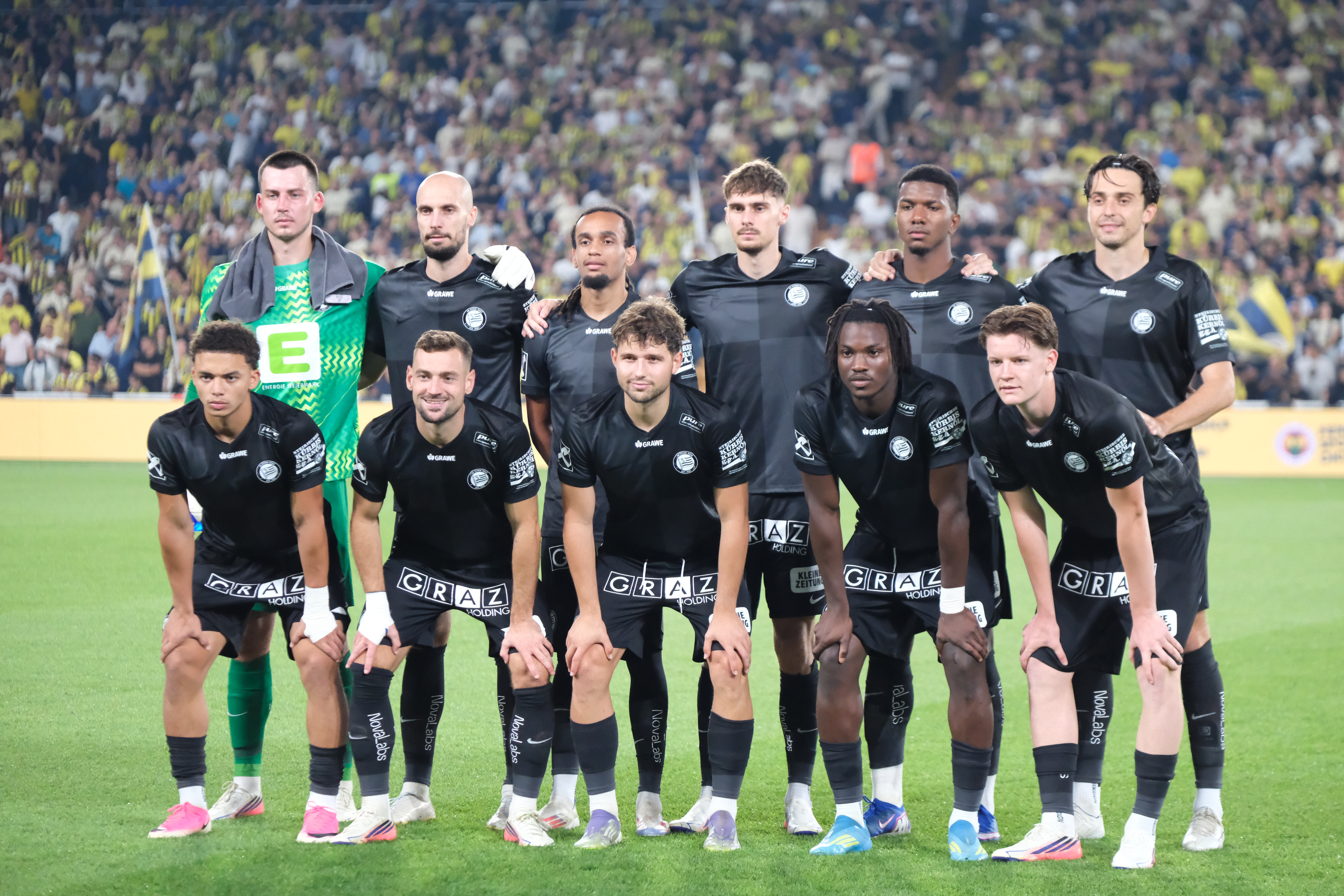
- Manager: Fabio Ingolitsch
- Stadium: Liebenauer Stadium
- Austrian Bundesliga: 4th
- Austrian Cup: Third round
- UEFA Champions League: Play-off round
- UEFA Europa League: League stage
- Top goalscorer: League: Oumar Diakité (7); All: Oumar Diakité (8)
- Highest home attendance: 16,546 (vs. SV Ried, 25 October 2026)
- Lowest home attendance: 13,109 (vs. Rennes, 16 September 2026)
- Average home league attendance: 15,571
- Biggest win: 6–1 (vs. Grazer AK, 18 October 2026)
- Biggest defeat: 3–0 (vs. Red Bull Salzburg, 20 September 2026) (vs. Bournemouth, 15 October 2026)
- All statistics correct as of 1 November 2026.

The 2026–27 season is the 118th season in the history of SK Sturm Graz, and the club's 61st consecutive season in the Austrian Bundesliga. In addition to the domestic league, the team is participating in the Austrian Cup and the UEFA Europa League, having been eliminated in the play-off round of the UEFA Champions League.

== Transfers ==
=== In ===
Pos.	Player	Transferred from	Fee	Date	Source
DF	(Serbia) Petar Petrović	(Serbia) Javor-Matis	€1,000,000	22 May 2026	
DF	(Austria) Jürgen Heil	(Austria) TSV Hartberg	Free	23 May 2026	
GK	(Austria) Ammar Helac	(Austria) TSV Hartberg	Free	23 May 2026	
MF	(Austria) Simon Seidl	(Austria) Blau-Weiß Linz	€100,000	28 May 2026	
DF	(Costa Rica) Jeyland Mitchell	(Netherlands) Feyenoord	€1,800,000	2 June 2026	
FW	(Germany) Nelson Weiper	(Germany) Mainz	Loan	17 July 2026	
MF	(France) Anis Mathurin	(France) Auxerre	Free	22 July 2026	
DF	(Venezuela) Luis Balbo	(Italy) Fiorentina	€1,500,000	29 July 2026	
MF	(Kosovo) Valmir Matoshi	(Switzerland) FC Thun	€700,000	24 August 2026	
DF	(Germany) Joshua Quarshie	(England) Southampton	Loan	27 August 2026	
FW	(Ivory Coast) Oumar Diakité	(France) Stade Reims	Loan	2 September 2026	

=== Out ===
Pos.	Player	Transferred to	Fee	Date	Source
GK	(Austria) Matteo Bignetti	(Germany) 1. FC Saarbrücken	Free	3 June 2026	
DF	(Belgium) Dimitri Lavalée	(Belgium) Standard Liège	Free	24 June 2026	
DF	(Bosnia and Herzegovina) Emir Karić	(United States) Sporting Kansas City	€450,000	24 June 2026	
DF	(Austria) David Burger	(Austria) Hartberg II	Free	1 July 2026	
DF	(Austria) Emanuel Aiwu	(Cyprus) Apollon Limassol	Undisclosed	17 July 2026	
FW	(Austria) Peter Kiedl	(Germany) Hansa Rostock	Undisclosed	30 July 2026	
MF	(Austria) Tim Huber	(Austria) SC Kalsdorf	Loan	2 August 2026	
MF	(France) Anis Mathurin	(Austria) SC Kalsdorf	Loan	4 August 2026	
MF	(Cameroon) Ryan Fosso	(Belgium) Standard Liège	€950,000	14 August 2026	
DF	(Costa Rica) Jeyland Mitchell	(France) RC Strasbourg	€8,000,000	19 August 2026	
FW	(Germany) Maurice Malone	(United States) Minnesota United	€1,500,000	24 August 2026	
FW	(Mali) Amady Camara	(Denmark) Randers	€700,000	31 August 2026	

== Competitions ==
=== Overall record ===
Competition	First match	Last match	Starting round	Final position	Record							
Competition	First match	Last match	Starting round	Final position	Pld	W	D	L	GF	GA	GD	Win %
Austrian Football Bundesliga	1 August 2026		Matchday 1		11	5	4	2	19	13	+6	45.45
Austrian Cup	24 July 2026	29 October 2026	First round	Third round	3	2	0	1	9	4	+5	66.67
UEFA Champions League	21 July 2026	11 August 2026	Second qualifying round	Play-off round	4	2	0	2	6	3	+3	50.00
UEFA Europa League	16 September 2026		League phase		3	1	1	1	1	3	−2	33.33
Total					21	10	5	6	35	23	+12	47.62

Last updated: 1 November 2026
Source: Soccerway

=== Austrian Bundesliga ===
==== League table ====
Pos	Team	Pld	W	D	L	GF	GA	GD	Pts	Qualification
3	LASK	12	8	1	3	30	15	+15	25	Qualification for the Championship round
4	TSV Hartberg	12	6	2	4	23	19	+4	20	Qualification for the Championship round
5	Sturm Graz	12	5	4	3	22	17	+5	19	Qualification for the Championship round
6	SV Ried	12	4	4	4	21	22	−1	16	Qualification for the Championship round
7	WSG Tirol	12	3	4	5	15	18	−3	13	Qualification for the Relegation round

Updated to match(es) played on 8 November 2026. Source: Austrian Football Bundesliga
Rules for classification: 1) Points; 2) Head-to-head record; 3) Goal difference; 4) Goals scored; 5) Matches won; 6) Away matches won; 7) Away goals scored.

==== Results summary ====
Overall								Home						Away					
Pld	W	D	L	GF	GA	GD	Pts	W	D	L	GF	GA	GD	W	D	L	GF	GA	GD
11	5	4	2	19	13	+6	19	3	2	0	12	5	+7	2	2	2	7	8	−1

Last updated: 1 November 2026.
Source: Bundesliga

==== Results by round ====
Round	1	2	3	4	5	6	7	8	9	10	11
Ground	A	A	H	H	A	H	A	A	H	H	A
Result	D	W	W	D	L	W	L	W	W	D	D
Position	6	5	4	3	4	4	4	4	4	4	4

Updated to match(es) played on 1 November 2026. Source: ADMIRAL Bundesliga
A = Away; H = Home; W = Win; D = Draw; L = Loss

==== Matches ====
1 August 2026 1	WSG Tirol	1–1	Sturm Graz	Innsbruck
17:00	Olakigbe 42'; Gschösser (yellow card) 84'	Report	Seidl (yellow card) 14'; Hödl (yellow card) 18'; Soglo (yellow card) 19'; Fosso (yellow card) 25'; Włodarczyk 29'	Stadium: Tivoli Stadion Tirol; Attendance: 2,239; Referee: Stefan Ebner

8 August 2026 2	TSV Hartberg	0–2	Sturm Graz	Hartberg
19:30	Schopp (yellow card) 37' (yellow-red card) 60'	Report	Weiper 70', 81'; Vallçi (yellow card) 90+4'	Stadium: Profertil Arena Hartberg; Attendance: 5,085; Referee: Julian Weinberger

15 August 2026 3	Sturm Graz	1–0	SCR Altach	Graz
19:30	Jatta 78'	Report	Jäger (yellow card) 36'; Greil (yellow card) 40'	Stadium: Liebenauer Stadium; Attendance: 15,527; Referee: Florian Jäger

22 August 2026 4	Sturm Graz	1–1	Austria Lustenau	Graz
19:30	Weiper (yellow card) 66'; Jatta 66' (pen.); Gorenc Stanković (yellow card) 90+2'; Mamageishvili (yellow card) 90+2'	Report	Weixelbraun 10'; Kacuri (yellow card) 45'; Ismailcebioglu (yellow card) 90+5'; Schierl (red card) 90+7'	Stadium: Liebenauer Stadium; Attendance: 14,512; Referee: Julian Weinberger

30 August 2026 5	Rapid Wien	3–1	Sturm Graz	Wien
17:00	Demir 7' (pen.); Tilio 17'; Amane (yellow card) 59'; Dahl 86'; Wurmbrand (yellow card) 89'	Report	Heil (yellow card) 3'; Beganović 10'; Gorenc Stanković (yellow card) 53'; Weinhandl (yellow card) 65'; Vallçi (red card) 90'	Stadium: Allianz Stadion; Attendance: 24,689; Referee: Stefan Ebner

13 September 2026 6	Sturm Graz	2–1	LASK	Graz
17:00	Heil (yellow card) 13'; Mamageishvili 34'; Diakité 59'; Kiteishvili (yellow card) 85', (penalty missed) 90+6'; Rózga (yellow card) 85'	Report	Daněk 45+3'; Bogarde (yellow card) 76'; Horvath (yellow card) 85'	Stadium: Liebenauer Stadium; Attendance: 15,878; Referee: Sebastian Gishamer

20 September 2026 7	Red Bull Salzburg	3–0	Sturm Graz	Salzburg
17:00 CEST (UTC+2)	Veratschnig 72'; Boma 77'; Camara 83'	Report	Heil (yellow card) 72' (red card) 76'; Koller (yellow card) 79'	Stadium: Red Bull Arena; Attendance: 12,631; Referee: Isa Simsek

10 October 2026 8	Austria Wien	0–2	Sturm Graz	Wien
19:30 CEST (UTC+2)	Nnodim (yellow card) 77'	Report	Diakité 45+1', 56' (pen.); Weinhandl (yellow card) 66'; Balbo (yellow card) 90'	Stadium: Generali-Arena; Attendance: 14,368; Referee: Walter Altmann

18 October 2026 9	Sturm Graz	6–1	Grazer AK	Graz
17:00	Weinhandl 38'; Heil 39'; Diakité 41', 49', 51', (yellow card) 52'; Gorenc Stanković 75'; Halwachs (yellow card) 82'	Report	Cvetko 11'; Große (yellow card) 48'; Hofleitner (yellow card) 53'	Stadium: Liebenauer Stadium; Attendance: 15,391; Referee: Julian Weinberger

25 October 2026 10	Sturm Graz	2–2	SV Ried	Graz
14:30	Seidl 31'; Malić (red card) 45+2'; Gorenc Stanković (yellow card) 45+3'; Beganović 90+2'; Włodarczyk (yellow card) 90+3'	Report	Capan (yellow card) 26'; Pomer 45+4' (pen.); Rossdorfer (yellow card) 47'; Thelin 55'	Stadium: Liebenauer Stadium; Attendance: 16,546; Referee: Safak Barmaksiz

1 November 2026 11	Wolfsberger AC	1–1	Sturm Graz	Wolfsberg
14:30 CET (UTC+1)	Fitz (yellow card) 40'; Avdijaj 45'; Kitz (yellow card) 58'	Report	Quarshie (yellow card) 90+4'; Diakité 90+4'	Stadium: Lavanttal-Arena; Attendance: 4,528; Referee: Alain Sadikovski

=== Austrian Cup ===
24 July 2026 First round	SV Seekirchen	0–3	Sturm Graz	Seekirchen am Wallersee
20:30	Heuberger (yellow card) 22'; Pär (yellow card) 28'; Leitenstorfer (yellow card) 58'; Freund (yellow card) 73'; Braun (yellow card) 81'	Report	Seidl 39'; Fosso 49'; Włodarczyk 85'	Stadium: Seekirchen Sportzentrum; Attendance: 1,600; Referee: Markus Greinecker

5 September 2026 Second round	ASK Voitsberg	1–4	Sturm Graz	Voitsberg
15:30	Scheucher (yellow card) 28'; Neubauer 83'; Schriebl (yellow card) 84'; Zivanović (yellow card) 86'	Report	Weiper 15'; Malić (yellow card) 43'; Gorenc Stanković (yellow card) 47'; Seidl 66'; Mamageishvili 70'; Kiteishvili 87'	Stadium: Hans Blümel Stadion; Attendance: 3,650; Referee: Isa Simsek

29 October 2026 Third round	Austria Lustenau	3–2	Sturm Graz	Lustenau
18:00	Jastremski 16', 65', (yellow card) 54'; Weixelbraun 26'; Grabher (yellow card) 34'; Diarra (yellow card) 76'; Maak (yellow card) 86'	Report	Balbo 35', (yellow card) 58'; Matoshi (yellow card) 51'; Petrović (yellow card) 56'; Quarshie (yellow card) 68'; Seidl 80'; Diakité (yellow card) 90+2'	Stadium: Reichshofstadion; Attendance: 3,115; Referee: Arnes Talic

=== UEFA Champions League ===
==== Second qualifying round ====
The draw for the second qualifying round was held on 17 June 2026.

21 July 2026 First leg	Sturm Graz (Austria)	4–0	(Scotland) Heart of Midlothian	Liebenauer Stadium, Graz
20:45	Gorenc Stanković 4', (yellow card) 56'; Mitchell 50'; Weinhandl 53'; Heil 59'	Report	McEntee (yellow card) 47'; Ba-Sy (yellow card) 86'	Attendance: 15,822; Referee: Gergo Bogár (Hungary)

28 July 2026 Second leg	Heart of Midlothian (Scotland)	0–2 (0–6 agg.)	(Austria) Sturm Graz	Tynecastle Park, Edinburgh
19:45		Report	Vallçi (yellow card) 61'; Seidl 64'; Soglo 68'	Attendance: 17,861; Referee: Andris Treimanis (Latvia)

==== Play-off round ====
The play-off round draw was held on 3 August 2026.

5 August 2026 First leg	Fenerbahçe (Turkey)	2–0	(Austria) Sturm Graz	Şükrü Saracoğlu Stadium, Istanbul
21:00	Talisca 10'; Greenwood 45'	Report	Gorenc Stanković (yellow card) 21'; Heil (yellow card) 58'; Kayombo (yellow card) 65'	Attendance: 39,800; Referee: Chris Kavanagh (England)

11 August 2026 Second leg	Sturm Graz (Austria)	0–1 (0–3 agg.)	(Turkey) Fenerbahçe	Liebenauer Stadium, Graz
20:30	Mitchell (yellow card) 84'; Fosso (yellow card) 90+4'	Report	Semedo (yellow card) 40'; Brown (yellow card) 45+1'; Talisca 66' (pen.); Aktürkoğlu (yellow card) 90'	Attendance: 15,589; Referee: Alejandro Hernández (Spain)

=== UEFA Europa League ===
==== League phase ====
Sturm Graz were in Pot 3 for the league phase draw, which was held on 28 August 2026. Sturm Graz were randomly drawn to play Marseille and AZ Alkmaar from Pot 1, Rennes and Dinamo Zagreb from Pot 2, Celje and Bournemouth from Pot 3, and finally OFI Crete and TSG Hoffenheim from Pot 4.

===== League phase table =====
Pos	Team	Pld	W	D	L	GF	GA	GD	Pts	Qualification
22	(Czech Republic) Sparta Prague	4	1	1	2	6	6	0	4	Advance to knockout phase play-offs (unseeded)
23	(Germany) TSG Hoffenheim	4	1	1	2	6	6	0	4	Advance to knockout phase play-offs (unseeded)
24	(Austria) Sturm Graz	4	1	1	2	3	6	−3	4	Advance to knockout phase play-offs (unseeded)
25	(Slovenia) Celje	4	1	1	2	5	9	−4	4	
26	(Austria) Red Bull Salzburg	4	1	1	2	3	8	−5	4	

Updated to match(es) played on 5 November 2026. Source: UEFA
Rules for classification: League phase tiebreakers

===== Results summary =====
Overall								Home						Away					
Pld	W	D	L	GF	GA	GD	Pts	W	D	L	GF	GA	GD	W	D	L	GF	GA	GD
3	1	1	1	1	3	−2	4	1	1	0	1	0	+1	0	0	1	0	3	−3

Last updated: 22 October 2026.
Source: UEFA

===== Results by round =====
Round	1	2	3	4	5	6	7	8
Ground	H	A	H	H	A	A	H	A
Result	D	L	W					
Position	17	26	19					
Points	1	1	4					

Updated to match(es) played on 22 October 2026. Source: UEFA
A = Away; H = Home; W = Win; D = Draw; L = Loss; P = Postponed

===== Matches =====
Win Draw Loss Fixtures

16 September 2026 1	Sturm Graz (Austria)	0–0	(France) Rennes	Graz, Austria
21:00 UTC+1	Balbo (yellow card) 51'; Stanković (yellow card) 90+7'			Stadium: Liebenauer Stadium; Attendance: 13,109; Referee: Manfredas Lukjančukas (Lithuania)

15 October 2026 2	Bournemouth (England)	3–0	(Austria) Sturm Graz	Bournemouth, England
20:00 UTC+0	Evanilson (yellow card) 14', (goal) 43'; Diakité (yellow card) 58'; Soler (yellow card) 66'; Rayan 76'; Rodríguez 90+2' (pen.)	Report	Beganović (yellow card) 41'; Halwachs (yellow card) 85'; Vallçi (yellow card) 87'	Stadium: Dean Court; Attendance: 12,070; Referee: Jérôme Brisard (France)

22 October 2026 3	Sturm Graz (Austria)	1–0	(France) Marseille	Graz, Austria
18:45 UTC+1	Diakité 13', (yellow card) 33'; Weinhandl (yellow card) 63'; Malić (yellow card) 84'	Report	Angel Gomes (yellow card) 24'; Gouiri (yellow card) 80'; Meïté (yellow card) 90+1'	Stadium: Liebenauer Stadium; Attendance: 14,215; Referee: Nenad Minaković (Serbia)

5 November 2026 4	Sturm Graz (Austria)	v	(Slovenia) Celje	Graz, Austria
21:00 UTC+1				Stadium: Liebenauer Stadium

28 November 2026 5	TSG Hoffenheim (Germany)	v	(Austria) Sturm Graz	Sinsheim, Germany
21:00 UTC+1				Stadium: Rhein-Neckar-Arena

10 December 2026 6	AZ Alkmaar (Netherlands)	v	(Austria) Sturm Graz	Alkmaar, Netherlands
18:45 UTC+1				Stadium: AFAS Stadion

21 January 2027 7	Sturm Graz (Austria)	v	(Greece) OFI Crete	Graz, Austria
18:45 UTC+1				Stadium: Liebenauer Stadium

28 January 2027 8	Dinamo Zagreb (Croatia)	v	(Austria) Sturm Graz	Zagreb, Croatia
21:00 UTC+1				Stadium: Stadion Maksimir

== Statistics ==
=== Goalscorers ===
Rank	Pos.	Player	Austrian Bundesliga	Austrian Cup	Champions League	Europa League	Total
1	FW	(Ivory Coast) Oumar Diakité	7	0	0	1	8
2	MF	(Austria) Simon Seidl	1	3	1	0	5
3	FW	(Germany) Nelson Weiper	2	1	0	0	3
4	FW	(Norway) Seedy Jatta	2	0	0	0	2
4	FW	(Austria) Belmin Beganović	2	0	0	0	2
4	FW	(Poland) Szymon Włodarczyk	1	1	0	0	2
4	MF	(Georgia (country)) Gizo Mamageishvili	1	1	0	0	2
4	MF	(Austria) Luca Weinhandl	1	0	1	0	2
4	DF	(Austria) Jürgen Heil	1	0	1	0	2
4	MF	(Slovenia) Jon Gorenc Stanković	1	0	1	0	2
11	MF	(Cameroon) Ryan Fosso	0	1	0	0	1
11	MF	(Georgia (country)) Otar Kiteishvili	0	1	0	0	1
11	DF	(Venezuela) Luis Balbo	0	1	0	0	1
11	DF	(Costa Rica) Jeyland Mitchell	0	0	1	0	1
11	DF	(England) Emran Soglo	0	0	1	0	1

Last updated: 1 November 2026.
Source: FBref.com
