= Jacob Hödl =

Austrian footballer (born 2007)

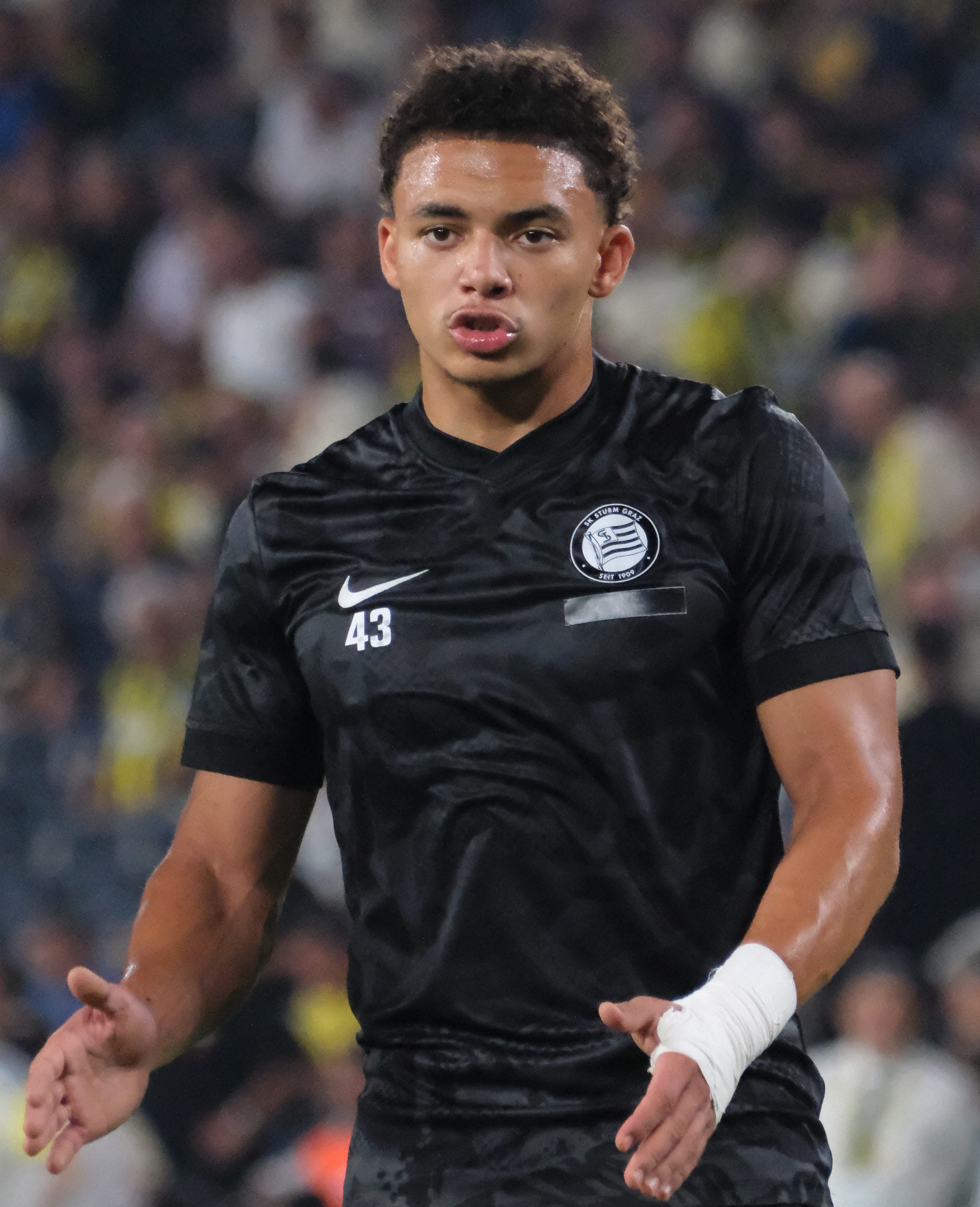

Personal information
- Full name: Jacob Peter Hödl
- Date of birth: 31 January 2007 (age 19)
- Place of birth: Hartberg, Austria
- Height: 1.75 m (5 ft 9 in)
- Positions: Wing-back; forward; midfielder

Team information
- Current team: Sturm Graz
- Number: 43

Youth career
- JAZ GU-Süd
- 2013–2023: Sturm Graz

Senior career*
Years	Team	Apps	(Gls)
2023–2025	Sturm Graz II	32	(3)
2024–	Sturm Graz	44	(2)

International career^{‡}
2021	Austria U15	2	(1)
2024	Austria U17	7	(0)
2024–2025	Austria U18	6	(1)
2025–	Austria U19	2	(0)
2025–	Austria U21	7	(1)
- * Club domestic league appearances and goals as of 25 October 2026 ‡ National team caps and goals as of 6 October 2026

Jacob Peter Hödl (born 31 January 2007) is an Austrian professional footballer who plays as a forward for Sturm Graz.

== Club career ==
Born in Hartberg, Hödl is a youth product of JAZ GU-Süd and Sturm Graz.

In September 2024, he signed his first professional contract with Sturm Graz, having already become a regular starter with its reserve team. The following season, he became regularly decisive with Strum II, most notably scoring an Austrian Second League goal of the round against FC Liefering to offer his team a 1–0 victory.

Hödl made his professional debut with Sturm Graz in a 2–0 Austrian Football Bundesliga win over Blau Weiss Linz on 20 April 2025. The following month, he signed a contract extension with the club, establishing himself as a regular member of the first team amidst a youthful squad comprising the likes of Leon Grgic, Konstantin Schopp, Belmin Beganović or Arjan Malić.

== International career ==
Hödl is a youth international for Austria, having played for the under-17 team, taking part in the 2024 European championship.

== Career statistics ==
As of match played 29 October 2026

Appearances and goals by club, season and competition
Club	Season	League			National cup		Europe		Other		Total	
Club	Season	Division	Apps	Goals	Apps	Goals	Apps	Goals	Apps	Goals	Apps	Goals
Sturm Graz II	2023–24	2. Liga	12	0	—		—		—		12	0
Sturm Graz II	2024–25	2. Liga	20	3	—		—		—		20	3
Sturm Graz II	Total		32	3	—		—		—		32	3
Sturm Graz	2024–25	Austrian Bundesliga	6	0	0	0	0	0	—		6	0
Sturm Graz	2025–26	Austrian Bundesliga	28	2	3	0	9 (Note: Two appearances in UEFA Champions League, seven appearances in UEFA Europa League)	0	—		40	2
Sturm Graz	2026–27	Austrian Bundesliga	10	0	2	0	7 (Note: Four appearances in UEFA Champions League, three appearances in UEFA Europa League)	0	—		19	0
Sturm Graz	Total		44	2	5	0	16	0	—		65	2
Career total			76	5	5	0	16	0	0	0	97	5
