= Günther Neukirchner =

Austrian footballer

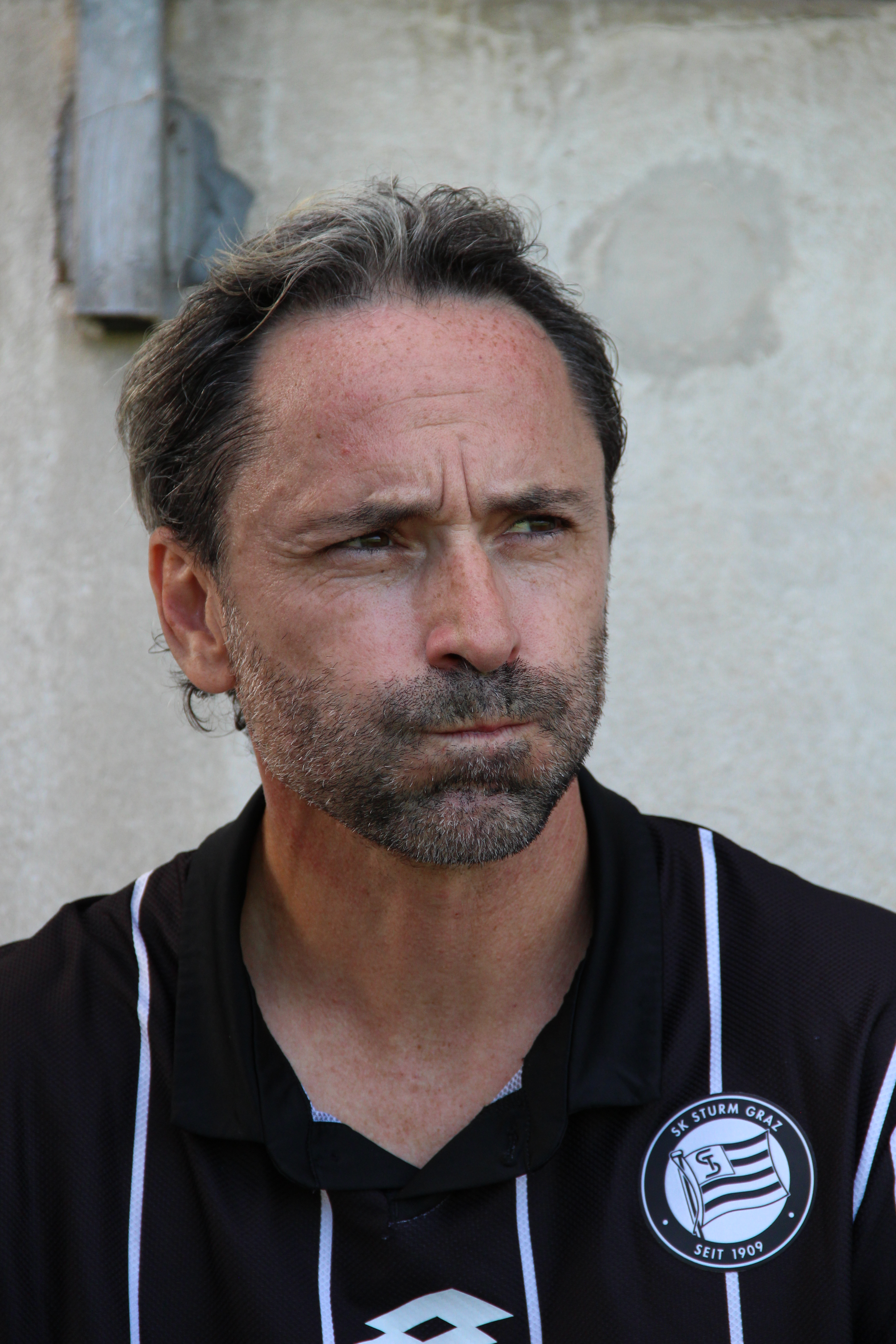
- Neukirchner with SK Sturm Graz in 2018

Personal information
- Date of birth: December 2, 1971 (age 54)
- Place of birth: Grambach, Austria
- Height: 1.77 m (5 ft 10 in)
- Position: Defender

Team information
- Current team: SK Sturm Graz (amateurs coach)

Youth career
- SK Sturm Graz

Senior career*
Years	Team	Apps	(Gls)
1989–2006	SK Sturm Graz	421	(28)
2006–2007	FC Gratkorn	16	(1)
Total		438	(29)

International career^{‡}
1992–1993	Austria U21	10	(2)
1998–2001	Austria	14	(1)

Managerial career
- 2014: SK Sturm Graz (interim)
- 2018: SK Sturm Graz (interim)
- * Club domestic league appearances and goals as of 11 August 2010 ‡ National team caps and goals as of 11 August 2010

Günther Neukirchner (born December 2, 1971) is a former Austrian football player in the position of a defender. He spent the greatest part of his active career with the traditional Styrian club SK Sturm Graz, with whom he enjoyed great success.

== Career ==
=== Playing career ===
Neukirchner played 17 years for Austrian Bundesliga side Sturm Graz. The all-rounder was a central player of SK Sturm Graz, and has been playing there since 1980. "Gü", as he was called by his teammates, first played in the youth team, the amateurs and later in the first team. He became an all-rounder because, as a young Sturm player, he was not used in his position as a striker and therefore kept moving to other positions. He has already played every position in the Bundesliga, with the exception of goalkeeper.

Neukirchner made his debut for the Austrian Football Association on August 19, 1998, against France in a 2–2 draw in Vienna. He made a total of 14 international appearances. His career in the national team came to a somewhat inglorious end when, together with eight teammates, he refused to fly to Israel to take part in the final qualifying match for the 2002 World Cup.

He became Austrian champion twice and Austrian cup winner three times with Sturm Graz. He also played three times in the Champions League.

On August 30, 2006, it was announced on the club's website that Neukirchner was ending his active career. On August 31, the Graz legend signed a contract with FC Gratkorn in the second-tier First League. In the summer of 2007, after 16 appearances and one goal, he ended his active career as a player there. With 426 games Günther Neukirchner played the second most games for SK Sturm Graz.

=== Coaching career ===
For the 2009/10 season, the Graz native moved back to his original club, this time to fill the position of co-coach of the amateur team. In September 2014, Neukirchner served as interim coach of the professionals for two games. In November 2018, he became interim coach for a second time for one game.

== Achievements ==
- 2× Austrian Champion (1997/1998 and 1998/1999)
- 4× Austrian runner-up (1994/1995, 1995/1996, 1999/2000, 2001/2002)
- 3× ÖFB Cup winner (1996, 1997, 1999)
- 2× ÖFB Cup finalist (1998 and 2002)
- 3× Austrian Supercup winner (1996, 1998, 1999)
- 2× Austrian Supercup finalist (1997, 2002)

== Other ==
After a 4–0 defeat to Grazer AK on February 27, 2005, Neukirchner delivered a legendary interview in which he criticized, above all, the "stupid" questions asked by the sports journalist from the Premiere channel.

At the general assembly of SK Sturm Graz on January 18, 2016, he was honored as honorary captain together with Mario Haas and Andy Pichler.

He also played futsal for the 1. FSC Graz.
