= Ammar Helać =

Austrian association footballer

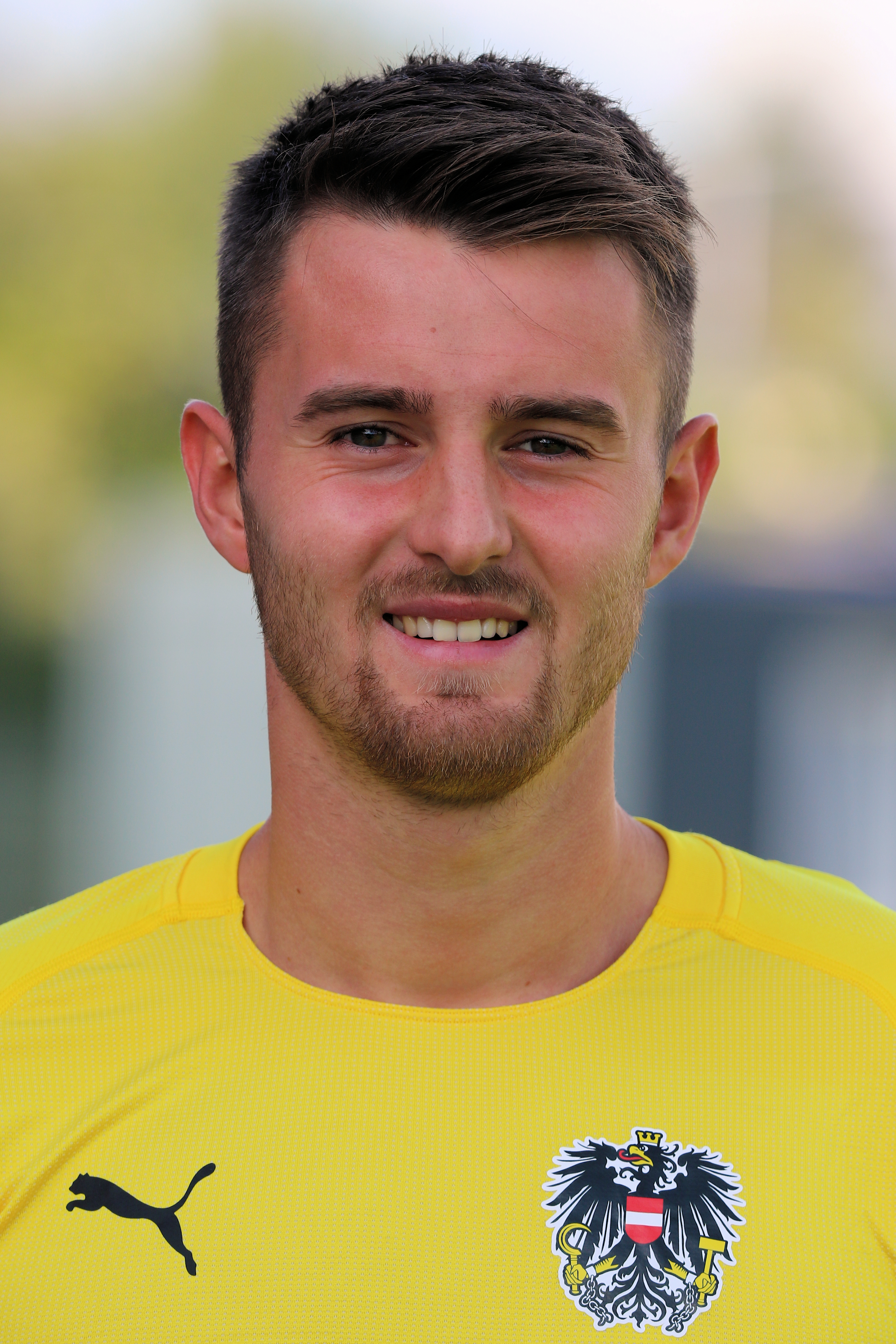
- Helać in 2019

Personal information
- Date of birth: 13 June 1998 (age 28)
- Place of birth: Linz, Austria
- Height: 1.90 m (6 ft 3 in)
- Position: Goalkeeper

Team information
- Current team: Sturm Graz
- Number: 22

Youth career
- 2006–2016: Donau Linz

Senior career*
Years	Team	Apps	(Gls)
2013–2017	Donau Linz II	5	(0)
2016–2017	Donau Linz	27	(0)
2017–2018	Blau-Weiß Linz II	5	(0)
2017–2020	Blau-Weiß Linz]	55	(0)
2020–2022	Austria Wien II	14	(0)
2020–2022	Austria Wien	0	(0)
2022–2024	Austria Lustenau	3	(0)
2024–2025	Rheindorf Altach	3	(0)
2025–2026	TSV Hartberg	3	(0)
2026–	Sturm Graz	4	(0)

International career^{‡}
2019	Austria U20	1	(0)
2019–2020	Austria U21	2	(0)
- * Club domestic league appearances and goals as of 25 October 2026 ‡ National team caps and goals as of 16:43, 29 June 2022 (UTC)

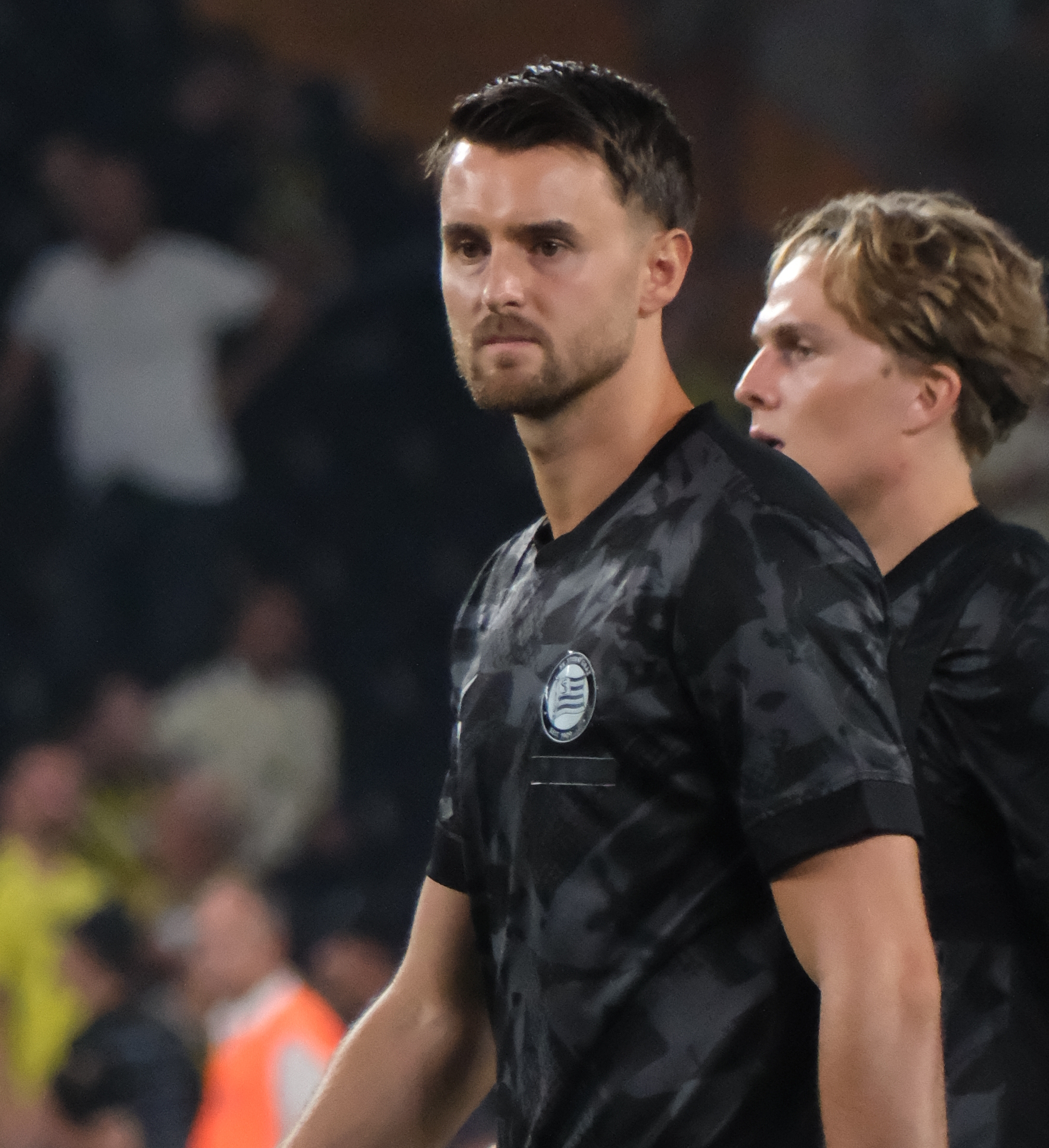
Helać in 2026

Ammar Helać (born 13 June 1998) is an Austrian professional footballer who plays as a goalkeeper for Austrian Bundesliga club Sturm Graz.

== Career ==
Helać is a product of the youth academy of Donau Linz, and began his senior career with them in 2016. On 17 November 2017, he transferred to Blau-Weiß Linz in the 2. Liga. He made his professional debut with Blau-Weiß Linz in a 2–0 2. Liga loss to WSG Tirol on 17 November 2017. After three seasons with them, he moved to Austria Wien on 20 February 2020.

For the 2024–25 season, Helać joined Rheindorf Altach.

On 1 July 2025, he joined Austrian Bundesliga club TSV Hartberg for the 2025–26 season.

== International career ==
Born in Austria, Helać is of Bosnian descent. He is a youth international for Austria, having represented the Austria U20s and U21s.

== Career statistics ==
As of match played 29 October 2026

Appearances and goals by club, season and competition
Club	Season	League			Cup		Europe		Other		Total	
Club	Season	Division	Apps	Goals	Apps	Goals	Apps	Goals	Apps	Goals	Apps	Goals
Donau Linz II	2014–15	Bezirksliga Oberbayern-Nord	2	0	—		—		—		2	0
Donau Linz II	2016–17	Bezirksliga Oberbayern-Nord	3	0	—		—		—		3	0
Donau Linz II	Total		5	0	—		—		—		5	0
Donau Linz	2016–17	OÖ Liga	27	0	—		—		—		27	0
Blau-Weiß Linz II	2017–18	2. Liga	5	0	—		—		—		5	0
Blau-Weiß Linz]	2017–18	2. Liga	7	0	1	0	—		—		8	0
Blau-Weiß Linz]	2018–19	2. Liga	29	0	0	0	—		—		29	0
Blau-Weiß Linz]	2019–20	2. Liga	19	0	1	0	—		—		20	0
Blau-Weiß Linz]	Total		55	0	2	0	—		—		57	0
Austria Wien II	2020–21	2. Liga	12	0	—		—		—		12	0
Austria Wien II	2021–22	2. Liga	2	0	—		—		—		2	0
Austria Wien II	Total		14	0	—		—		—		14	0
Austria Wien	2020–21	Austrian Bundesliga	0	0	0	0	—		0	0	0	0
Austria Wien	2021–22	Austrian Bundesliga	0	0	0	0	0	0	—		0	0
Austria Wien	2022–23	Austrian Bundesliga	—		0	0	—		—		0	0
Austria Wien	Total		0	0	0	0	0	0	0	0	0	0
Austria Lustenau	2022–23	Austrian Bundesliga	3	0	1	0	—		0	0	4	0
Austria Lustenau	2023–24	Austrian Bundesliga	0	0	3	0	—		—		3	0
Austria Lustenau	Total		3	0	4	0	—		—		7	0
Rheindorf Altach	2024–25	Austrian Bundesliga	3	0	0	0	—		—		3	0
TSV Hartberg	2025–26	Austrian Bundesliga	3	0	0	0	—		—		3	0
Sturm Graz	2026–27	Austrian Bundesliga	4	0	1	0	1 (Note: appearances in UEFA Europa League)	0	—		6	0
Career total			119	0	7	0	1	0	0	0	127	0
