= Ludwig Durek =

Austrian footballer

Personal information
- Date of birth: 27 January 1921
- Date of death: 14 April 2000 (aged 79)
- Position: Striker

Senior career*
Years	Team	Apps	(Gls)
1933–1946	FC Wien		
1946–1956	SK Sturm Graz	143	(62)
- WSV Donawitz

International career
1940–1942	Germany	6	(2)
1945	Austria	2	(0)

Managerial career
- 1950: SK Sturm Graz
- WSV Donawitz
- Klagenfurter AC
- 1958–1960: SK Sturm Graz
- * Club domestic league appearances and goals

Ludwig Durek (27 January 1921 – 14 April 2000) was an Austrian international footballer. He was also part of Austria's squad for the football tournament at the 1948 Summer Olympics, but he did not play in any matches.
