= Petar Petrović (footballer, born 2005) =

Serbian footballer (born 2005)

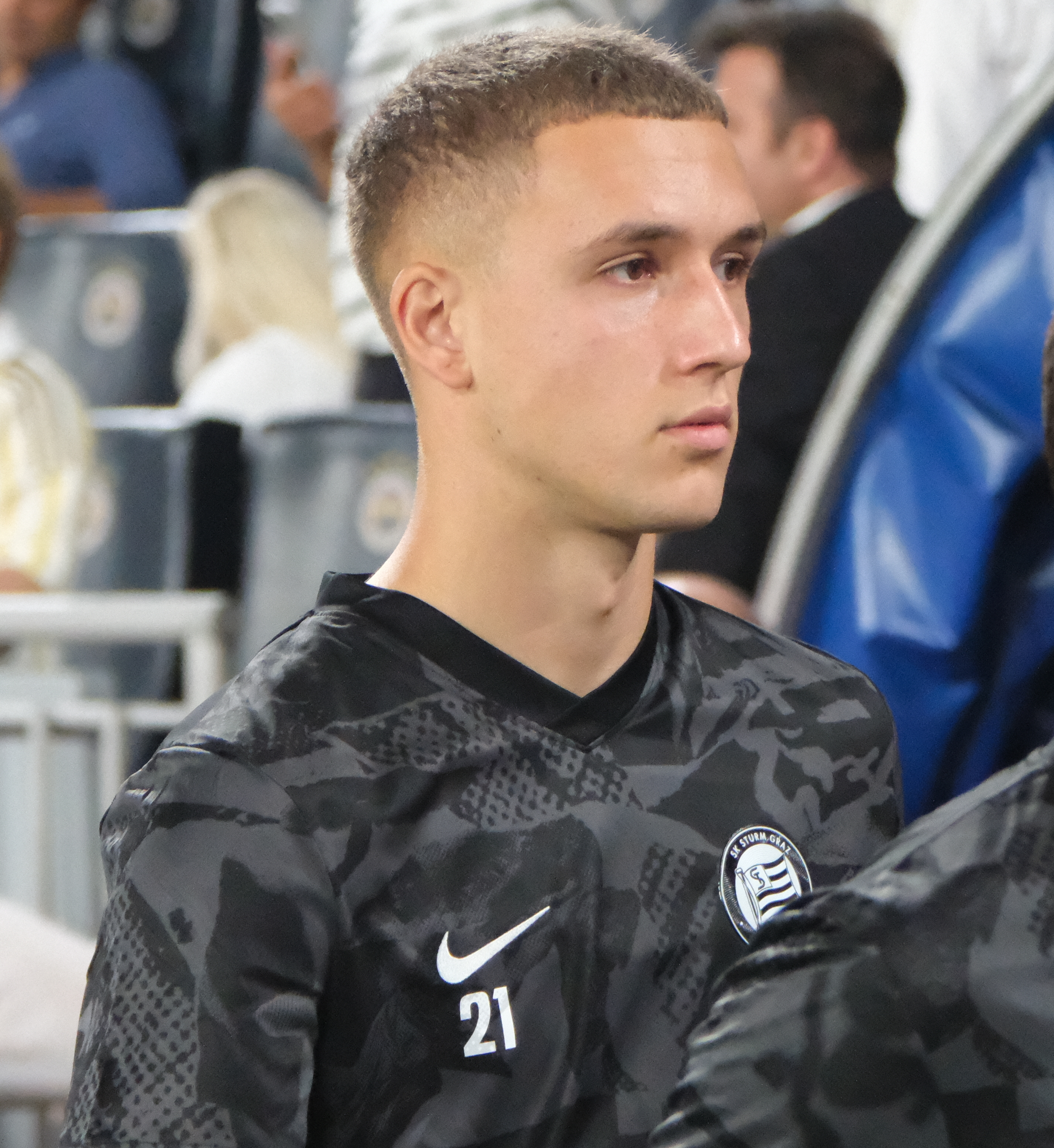

Personal information
- Date of birth: 13 July 2005 (age 21)
- Place of birth: Belgrade, Serbia and Montenegro
- Height: 1.91 m (6 ft 3 in)
- Position: Defender

Team information
- Current team: SK Sturm Graz
- Number: 35

Youth career
- –2021: Partizan
- 2021–2023: Teleoptik
- 2023–2024: Partizan

Senior career*
Years	Team	Apps	(Gls)
2024–2026	Javor Ivanjica	36	(4)
2025	→ Zlatibor Čajetina (loan)		
2026–	Sturm Graz	5	(0)

International career^{‡}
2026–	Serbia U21	6	(0)
2026–	Serbia	1	(0)
- * Club domestic league appearances and goals as of 25 October 2026 ‡ National team caps and goals as of 5 October 2026

Petar Petrović (Serbian Cyrillic: Петар Петровић; born 13 July 2005) is a Serbian professional footballer who plays as a defender for SK Sturm Graz.

== Club career ==
As a youth player, Petrović joined the youth academy of Serbian side FK Partizan. Following his stint there, he joined the youth academy of Serbian side FK Teleoptik in 2021. Two years later, he returned to the youth academy of Serbian side FK Partizan, where he played in the UEFA Youth League.

During the summer of 2024, he signed for Serbian side FK Javor Ivanjica, where he made thirty-six league appearances and scored four goals and helped the club achieve promotion from the second tier to the top flight. Subsequently, he was sent on loan to Serbian side FK Zlatibor Čajetina in early 2025. Serbian newspaper Blic wrote in 2026 that he "became a revelation in the SuperLiga" while playing for the club. Ahead of the 2026–27 season, he signed for Austrian side SK Sturm Graz.

== International career ==
Petrović is a Serbia youth international. On 26 March 2026, he debuted for the Serbia national under-21 football team during a 2–2 away friendly draw with the Kyrgyzstan national under-23 football team.

== Career statistics ==
=== Club ===
As of match played 29 October 2026

Appearances and goals by club, season and competition
Club	Season	League			Cup		Europe		Other		Total	
Club	Season	Division	Apps	Goals	Apps	Goals	Apps	Goals	Apps	Goals	Apps	Goals
Javor Ivanjica	2024–25	Serbian SuperLiga	2	0	1	0	—		—		3	0
Javor Ivanjica	2025–26	Serbian SuperLiga	34	4	1	0	—		—		35	4
Javor Ivanjica	Total		36	4	2	0	—		—		38	4
Sturm Graz	2026–27	Austrian Bundesliga	5	0	3	1	2 (Note: One appearance in UEFA Champions League, one appearance in UEFA Europa League)	0	—		10	1
Career total			41	4	5	1	2	0	0	0	48	5

=== International ===
As of match played 4 June 2026

Appearances and goals by national team and year
National team	Year	Apps	Goals
Serbia	2026	1	0
Total		1	0
