= Werner Gregoritsch =

Austrian footballer and manager

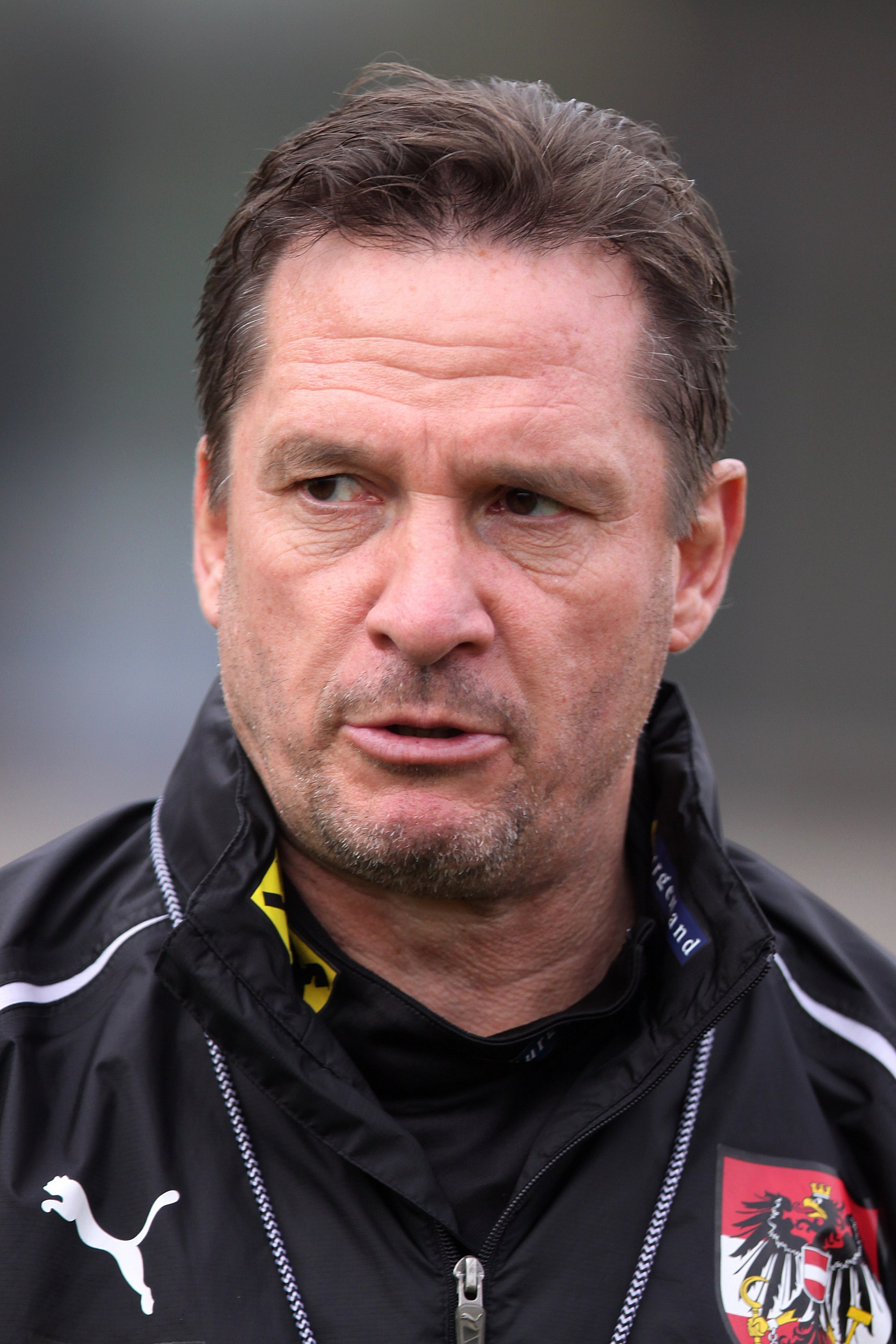
- Gregoritsch managing the Austria U21 national team in October 2015

Personal information
- Date of birth: 22 March 1958 (age 68)
- Place of birth: Graz, Austria
- Height: 1.80 m (5 ft 11 in)
- Position: Forward

Team information
- Current team: Austria U21 (manager)

Senior career*
Years	Team	Apps	(Gls)
1976–1981	Grazer AK	42	(10)
1981–1983	VOEST Linz	49	(9)
1983–1984	Grazer AK	21	(5)
1984–1985	First Vienna	22	(3)
1985–1987	DSV Leoben		
1987–1988	Deutschlandsberger SC		
1988–1989	SV Güssing		
1989–1990	ASK Schlaining		
1990–1991	ESK Graz		
Total		134	(27)

Managerial career
- 1988–1989: SV Güssing
- 1989–1990: ASK Schlaining
- 1990–1991: ESK Graz
- 1992–2000: Grazer AK Youth
- 2000–2001: Grazer AK
- 2002–2004: SV Mattersburg
- 2004–2006: LASK Linz
- 2006–2011: Kapfenberger SV
- 2012–: Austria U21
- * Club domestic league appearances and goals

Werner Gregoritsch (born 22 March 1958) is an Austrian football manager and former player. He manages the Austria U21 national team and has previously managed Kapfenberger SV, SV Mattersburg and Grazer AK.

== Personal life ==
Gregoritsch's son, Michael, is the youngest goalscorer in the history of the Austrian Bundesliga. He scored his first goal at the age of 15 years and 361 days.
