= Dietmar Pegam =

Austrian footballer and manager

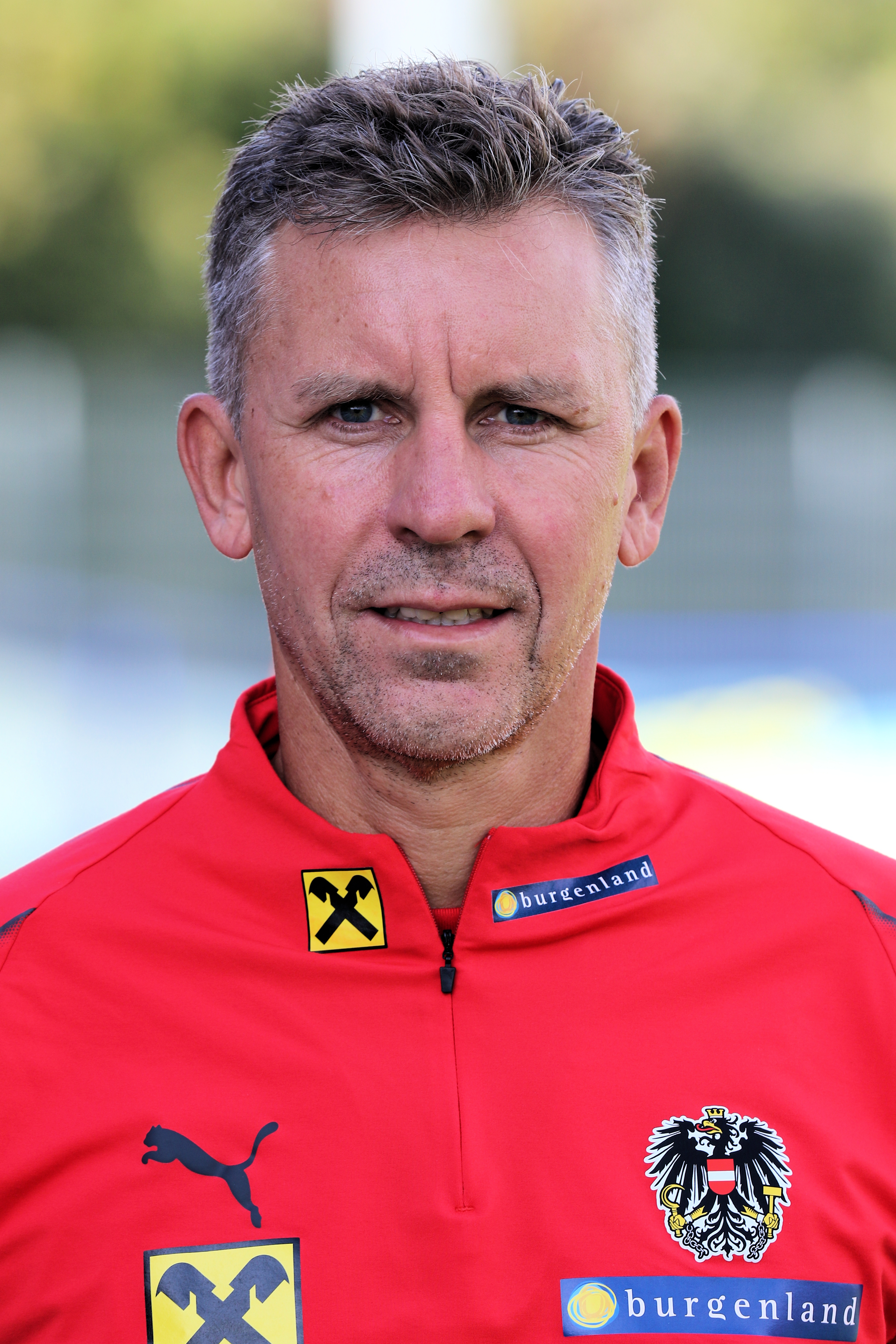

Personal information
- Date of birth: 11 June 1968 (age 58)
- Place of birth: Graz
- Position: Midfielder

Senior career*
Years	Team	Apps	(Gls)
1986–1992	SK Sturm Graz		
1992–1993	SVL Flavia Solva		
1993	Grazer AK		
1994–1996	SV Oberwart		
1996–1997	SVL Flavia Solva		

Managerial career
- 2007–2008: Grazer AK
- 2008–2009: SK Austria Kärnten (assistant)
- 2009–2012: SK Sturm Graz (assistant)
- 2012–2014: Austria u-21 (assistant)
- 2017–: Austria u-21 (assistant)
- * Club domestic league appearances and goals

Dietmar Pegam (born 11 June 1968) is an Austrian football midfielder and later manager.
