= Luis Balbo =

Venezuelan footballer

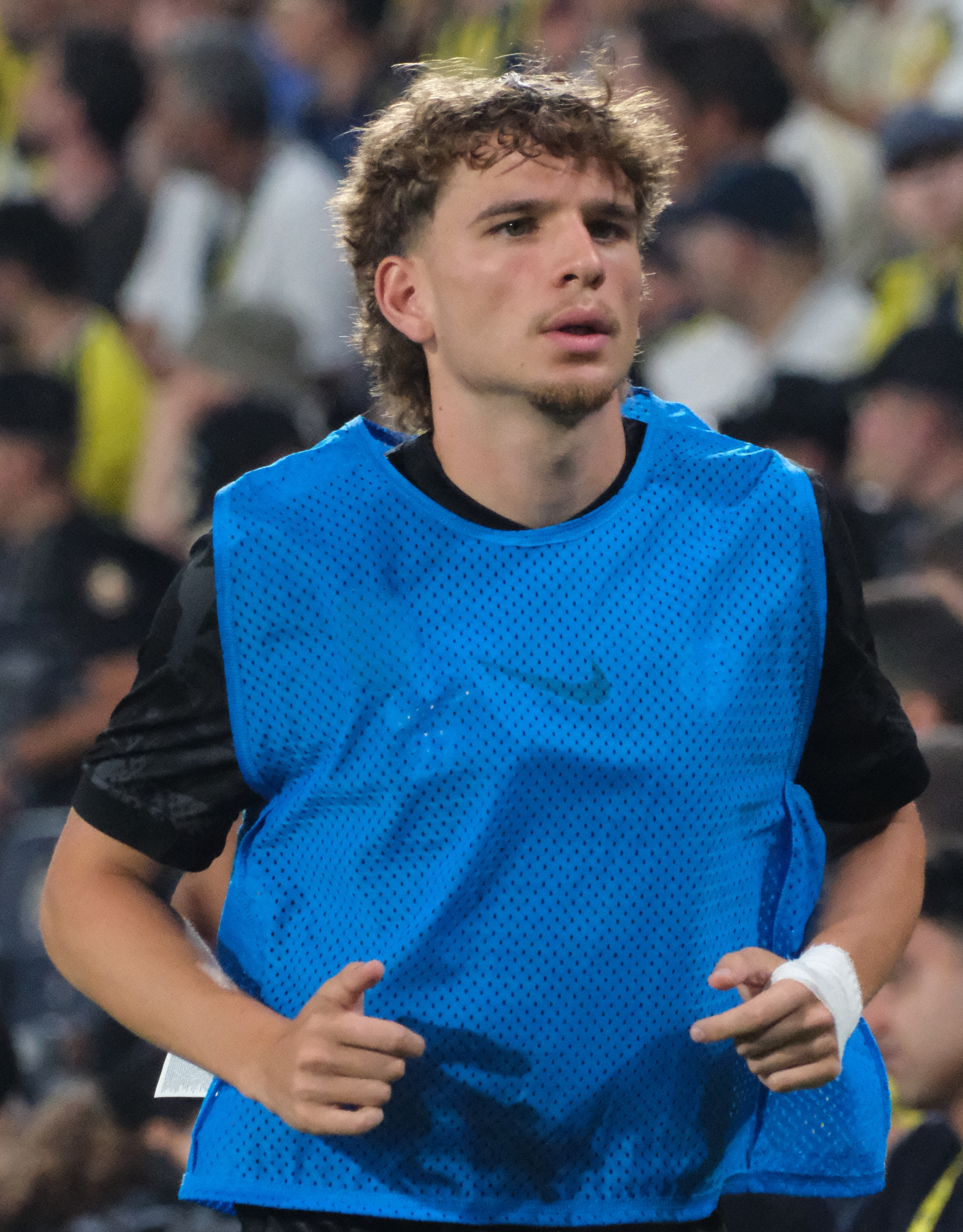
- Balbo with Sturm Graz in 2026

Personal information
- Full name: Luis Francisco Balbo Vieira
- Date of birth: 28 March 2006 (age 20)
- Place of birth: Ciudad Guayana, Venezuela
- Height: 1.78 m (5 ft 10 in)
- Position: Left-back

Team information
- Current team: Sturm Graz
- Number: 27

Youth career
- 2016–2017: União da Madeira
- 2017–2020: Porto
- 2020–2024: Famalicão
- 2024–2026: Fiorentina

Senior career*
Years	Team	Apps	(Gls)
2026	Fiorentina	6	(0)
2026–	Sturm Graz	8	(0)

International career^{‡}
2022	Portugal U16	1	(0)
2023	Venezuela U17	5	(0)
2025	Venezuela U20	2	(0)
2025	Venezuela U23	1	(0)
2025–	Venezuela	6	(0)
Medal record
Men's football
Representing Venezuela
FIFA Series
Runner-up	2026 Uzbekistan
- * Club domestic league appearances and goals as of 20:24, 25 October 2026 (UTC) ‡ National team caps and goals as of 22:01, 2 October 2026 (UTC)

Luis Francisco Balbo Vieira (born 28 March 2006) is a Venezuelan professional footballer who plays as a left-back for the Austrian Bundesliga club Sturm Graz. A former youth international for Portugal and Venezuela, he plays for the Venezuela national team.

== Club career ==
Balbo is a youth product of the academies of the Portuguese clubs União da Madeira, Porto and Famalicão. On 30 January 2024, he joined the Italian club Fiorentina on a contract until 2028.

== International career ==
Balbo was born in Venezuela to Venezuelan parents, and is of Portuguese descent through a grandmother. He moved to Portugal and holds dual Venezuelan and Portuguese citizenship. He made an appearance for the Portugal U16s in 2022. He played for the Venezuela U17s at the 2023 FIFA U-17 World Cup. He was also called up to the Venezuela U20s at the 2025 South American U-20 Championship.

He was called up to the senior Venezuela national team for a set of friendlies in November 2025. He debuted in a 1–0 win over Australia on 14 November 2025.

== Personal life ==
Luis Balbo has a brother, Luis Estefano, who is also a footballer but plays as a goalkeeper in Portugal.

== Career statistics ==
=== Club ===
As of match played 29 October 2026

Appearances and goals by club, season and competition
Club	Season	League			Cup		Europe		Other		Total	
Club	Season	League	Apps	Goals	Apps	Goals	Apps	Goals	Apps	Goals	Apps	Goals
Fiorentina	2025–26	Serie A	6	0	1	0	3 (Note: Appearances in UEFA Conference League)	0	—		10	0
Sturm Graz	2026–27	Austrian Bundesliga	8	0	2	0	3 (Note: Appearances in UEFA Europa League)	0	—		13	0
Career total			14	0	3	0	6	0	0	0	23	0

=== International ===
As of match played 2 October 2026

Appearances and goals by national team and year
National team	Year	Apps	Goals
Venezuela	2025	1	0
Venezuela	2026	5	0
Total		6	0

== Honours ==
Venezuela

- FIFA Series runner-up: 2026
