= Belmin Beganović =

Congolese footballer (born 2006)

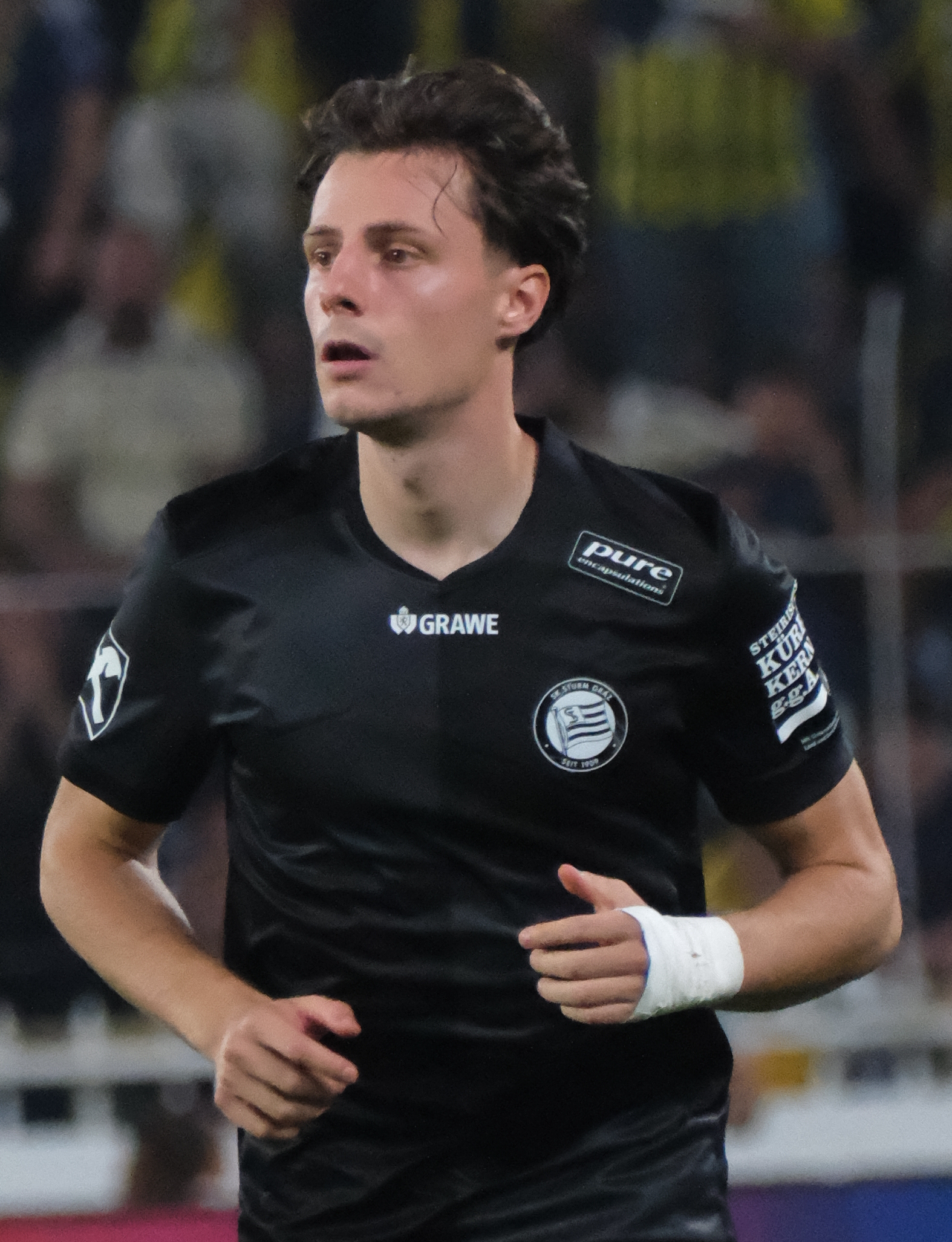

Personal information
- Date of birth: 9 September 2004 (age 22)
- Place of birth: Bihać, Bosnia and Herzegovina
- Height: 1.83 m (6 ft 0 in)
- Position: Forward

Team information
- Current team: Sturm Graz
- Number: 26

Youth career
- 2015–2018: USK St. Michael
- 2015–2018: Ried

Senior career*
Years	Team	Apps	(Gls)
2022–2024	Ried II	25	(8)
2022–2024	Ried	31	(8)
2024–	Sturm Graz II	20	(8)
2025–	Sturm Graz	22	(5)

International career^{‡}
2025–	Austria U21	4	(0)
- * Club domestic league appearances and goals as of 19:45, 25 October 2026 (UTC) ‡ National team caps and goals as of 19:02, 10 December 2025 (UTC)

Belmin Beganović (born 9 September 2004) is a professional footballer who plays as a forward for Austrian Bundesliga club Sturm Graz. Born in Bosnia and Herzegovina, he is a youth international for Austria.

== Career ==
Beganović is a product of the youth academies of the Austrian clubs USK St. Michael and Ried. On 15 July 2022, he was promoted to Ried's senior team in the Austrian Bundesliga. On 18 August 2024, he transferred to Sturm Graz on a contract until 2028. He helped Sturm Graz 2024–25 Austrian Football Bundesliga in his debut season with them.

== International career ==
Beganović was born in Bosnia and Herzegovina and moved to Austria at a young age, and holds dual Bosnian and Austrian citizenship. In March 2025, he was called up to the Austria U21s for a set of friendlies.

== Career statistics ==
As of match played 29 October 2026

Appearances and goals by club, season and competition
Club	Season	League			Cup		Europe		Other		Total	
Club	Season	Division	Apps	Goals	Apps	Goals	Apps	Goals	Apps	Goals	Apps	Goals
Ried II	2021–22	Austrian Regionalliga Central	12	2	—		—		—		12	2
Ried II	2022–23	Austrian Regionalliga Central	10	4	—		—		—		10	4
Ried II	2023–24	Austrian Regionalliga Central	3	2	—		—		—		3	2
Ried II	Total		25	8	—		—		—		25	8
Ried	2022–23	Austrian Bundesliga	12	1	2	0	—		—		14	1
Ried	2023–24	2. Liga	18	4	1	0	—		—		19	4
Ried	2024–25	2. Liga	1	0	1	1	—		—		2	1
Ried	Total		31	5	2	1	—		—		33	6
Sturm Graz II	2024–25	2. Liga	19	8	—		—		—		19	8
Sturm Graz II	2025–26	2. Liga	1	0	—		—		—		1	0
Sturm Graz II	Total		20	8	—		—		—		20	8
Sturm Graz	2024–25	Austrian Bundesliga	3	0	—		—		—		3	0
Sturm Graz	2025–26	Austrian Bundesliga	15	3	3	0	6 (Note: One appearance in UEFA Champions League, five appearances in UEFA Europa League)	0	—		24	3
Sturm Graz	2026–27	Austrian Bundesliga	4	2	3	0	6 (Note: Three appearances in UEFA Champions League, three appearances in UEFA Europa League)	0	—		13	2
Sturm Graz	Total		22	5	6	0	12	0	—		40	5
Career total			98	26	10	1	12	0	0	0	120	27

== Honours ==
Ried

- Austrian Football Second League: 2024–25

Sturm Graz

- Austrian Football Bundesliga: 2024–25
