= Emran Soglo =

English footballer (born 2005)

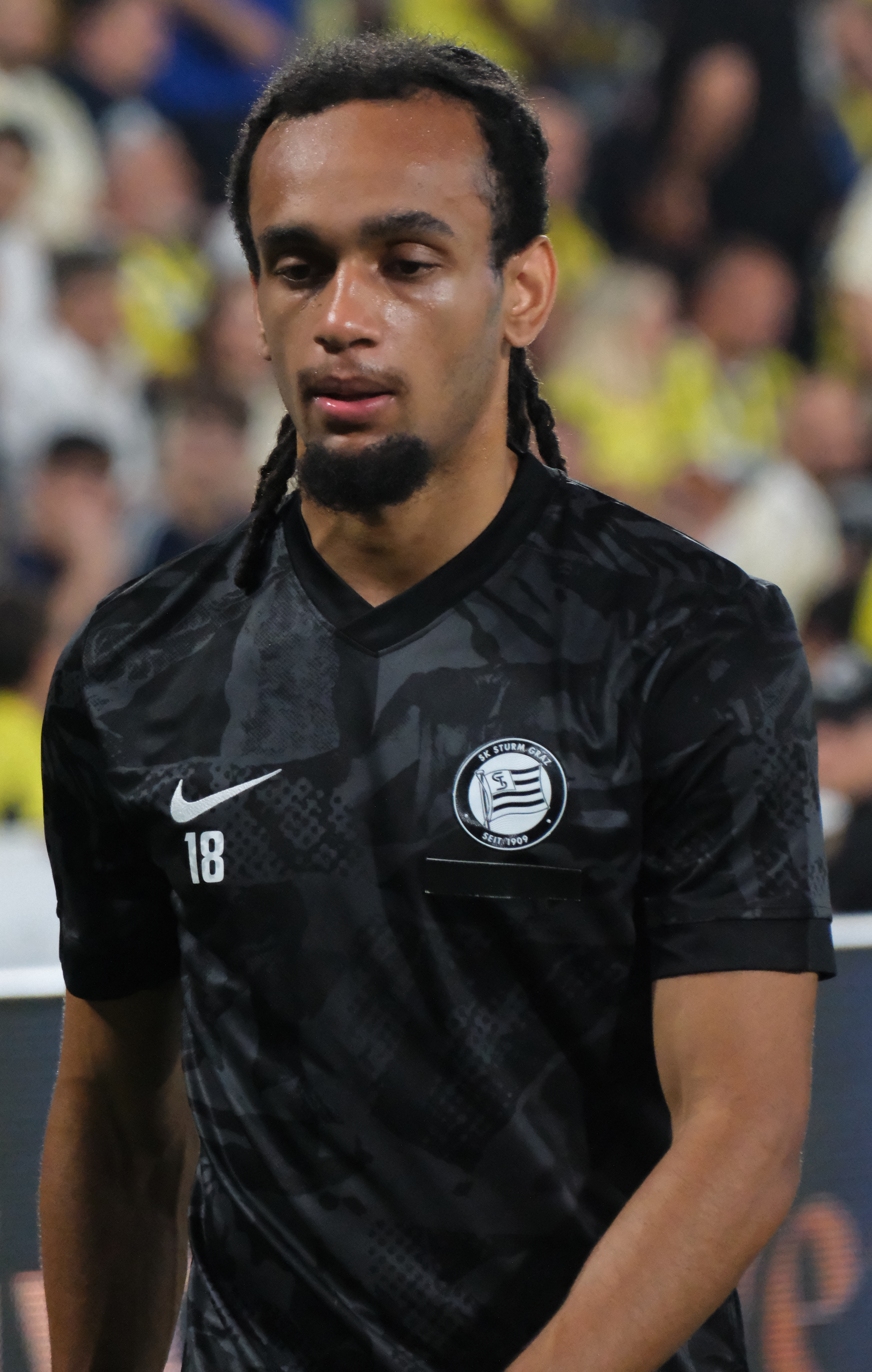
- Soglo with Sturm Graz in 2026

Personal information
- Full name: Emran Gamal Marwan Soglo
- Date of birth: 11 July 2005 (age 21)
- Place of birth: Créteil, France
- Height: 1.78 m (5 ft 10 in)
- Position: Left-back

Team information
- Current team: Sturm Graz
- Number: 18

Youth career
- Sucy FC
- –2013: RC Joinville
- 2013–2015: US Lusitanos Saint-Maur
- 2015–2021: Chelsea
- 2022: Marseille

Senior career*
Years	Team	Apps	(Gls)
2022–2025	Marseille B	17	(1)
2023–2025	Marseille	3	(1)
2025–	Sturm Graz	8	(0)
2025	Sturm Graz II	7	(0)
2025–2026	→ Zulte Waregem (loan)	18	(0)

International career^{‡}
2023	England U20	3	(1)
- * Club domestic league appearances and goals as of 30 August 2026 ‡ National team caps and goals as of 20 November 2023

Emran Gamal Marwan Soglo (born 11 July 2005) is a professional footballer who plays as a left-back for Austrian Football Bundesliga club Sturm Graz. Born in France, he represented England at youth level.

== Club career ==
Soglo joined Chelsea in 2015 at the age of 10. He left the club after six years going on trial with West Ham United. In February 2022, he joined Ligue 1 side Marseille. In August 2023, he made his professional league debut for Marseille, scoring in a 2–2 draw with Metz.

On 30 January 2025, Soglo signed with Sturm Graz in Austria.

On 8 September 2025, Soglo joined Belgian Pro League side Zulte Waregem on loan with an option to buy.

== International career ==
Born in France, grew up in England, and of Beninese descent, Soglo is eligible for both French and English national teams with his dual citizenship, and received calls with the England under-15s and under-17s. In September 2023, he was called up to the England U20 squad for the first time.

He made his U20 debut on 12 October 2023 during a 2–0 away defeat to Romania.

== Career statistics ==
As of match played 30 August 2026

Appearances and goals by club, season and competition
Club	Season	League			Cup		Europe		Total	
Club	Season	Division	Apps	Goals	Apps	Goals	Apps	Goals	Apps	Goals
Marseille II	2021–22	CFA 2	2	0	—		—		2	0
Marseille II	2022–23	CFA 2	8	0	—		—		8	0
Marseille II	2023–24	CFA 2	5	1	—		—		5	1
Marseille II	Total		15	1	—		—		15	1
Marseille	2023–24	Ligue 1	3	1	1	0	5 (Note: Appearances in UEFA Europa League)	0	9	1
Sturm Graz	2024–25	Austrian Bundesliga	3	0	—		—		3	0
Sturm Graz	2026–27	Austrian Bundesliga	5	0	1	0	4 (Note: Four appearances and one goal in UEFA Champions League)	1	10	1
Sturm Graz	Total		8	0	1	0	4	1	13	1
Sturm Graz II	2024–25	2. Liga	5	0	—		—		5	0
Sturm Graz II	2025–26	2. Liga	2	0	—		—		2	0
Sturm Graz II	Total		7	0	—		—		7	0
Zulte Waregem (loan)	2025–26	Belgian Pro League	18	0	2	0	—		20	0
Career total			51	2	4	0	9	1	64	3
