= Austria national under-21 football team =

National under-21 association football team representing Austria

Austria Under-21
- Association: Austrian Football Association
- Head coach: Werner Gregoritsch
- Captain: Kevin Danso
- Most caps: Markus Berger (36)
- Top scorer: Michael Gregoritsch (20)
First colours	Second colours

First international
- (Czech Republic) Czechoslovakia 1–2 Austria

Biggest win
- Austria 10–0 Liechtenstein; Austria 10–0 Saudi Arabia

Biggest defeat
- (Czech Republic) Czechoslovakia 6–0 Austria; Israel 6–0 Austria

UEFA U-21 Championship
- Appearances: 1 (first in 2019)
- Best result: Group stage (2019)

The Austria national under-21 football team is the national under-21 football team of Austria and is controlled by the Austrian Football Association.

This team is for Austrian players aged 21 or under at the start of a two-year European Under-21 Football Championship campaign, so players can be, and often are, up to 23 years old.

== Staff ==
- Head coach: Werner Gregoritsch
- Assistant coach: Dietmar Pegam
- Goalkeeper coach: Raimund Hedl

== Players ==
=== Current squad ===
The following players were called up for the 2027 UEFA European Under-21 Championship qualification Group I matches against Denmark on 2 October and Wales on 6 October 2026.

Caps and goals updated as of 6 October 2026, after the match against Wales.

No.	Pos.	Player	Date of birth (age)	Caps	Goals	Club
1	GK	Lukas Jungwirth	30 April 2004 (age 22)	9	0	(Austrian Football Association) LASK
12	GK	Nikola Sarcevic	27 December 2006 (age 19)	0	0	(Austrian Football Association) Red Bull Salzburg
	GK	Matteo Bignetti	6 May 2004 (age 22)	3	0	(German Football Association) 1. FC Saarbrücken
	GK	Juri Kirchmayr	11 December 2005 (age 20)	0	0	(Austrian Football Association) Wacker Innsbruck
2	DF	Eaden Roka	3 September 2007 (age 19)	0	0	(Austrian Football Association) Rapid Vienna
3	DF	Christopher Olivier	31 January 2006 (age 20)	4	0	(Danish Football Association) Brøndby
4	DF	David Puczka	26 January 2005 (age 21)	11	3	(Italian Football Federation) Genoa
5	DF	Jannik Schuster	16 May 2006 (age 20)	7	1	(The Football Association) Brentford
16	DF	Valentin Zabransky	2 February 2007 (age 19)	2	0	(Austrian Football Association) Red Bull Salzburg
22	DF	Ifeanyi Ndukwe	3 March 2008 (age 18)	1	0	(Royal Spanish Football Federation) Levante
	DF	Konstantin Schopp	30 December 2005 (age 20)	5	0	(Austrian Football Association) TSV Hartberg
	DF	Jakob Schöller	9 December 2005 (age 20)	2	0	(Austrian Football Association) Rapid Vienna
	DF	Matteo Schablas	14 March 2005 (age 21)	0	0	(Austrian Football Association) Austria Wien
6	MF	Nikolas Sattlberger	18 January 2004 (age 22)	20	0	(Royal Belgian Football Association) Genk
7	MF	Vasilije Marković	12 May 2008 (age 18)	3	0	(Austrian Football Association) Austria Wien
8	MF	Yanik Spalt	3 September 2007 (age 19)	1	0	(German Football Association) VfB Stuttgart
10	MF	Jacob Hödl	31 January 2007 (age 19)	7	1	(Austrian Football Association) Sturm Graz
11	MF	Oluwaseun Adewumi	23 February 2005 (age 21)	14	1	(German Football Association) Hertha BSC
14	MF	Luca Weinhandl	11 January 2009 (age 17)	2	1	(Austrian Football Association) Sturm Graz
18	MF	Nicolas Bajlicz	8 July 2004 (age 22)	8	0	(Austrian Football Association) Rapid Vienna
20	MF	Ensar Mušić	9 September 2007 (age 19)	1	0	(Austrian Football Association) Rapid Vienna
	MF	Florian Micheler	17 May 2005 (age 21)	8	0	(German Football Association) TSG Hoffenheim
9	FW	Furkan Dursun	14 March 2005 (age 21)	10	1	(Swiss Football Association) Thun
15	FW	Nikolaus Wurmbrand	5 January 2006 (age 20)	6	2	(Austrian Football Association) Rapid Vienna
17	FW	Erik Kojzek	2 January 2006 (age 20)	7	3	(Football Association of Serbia) Partizan
19	FW	Oghenetejiri Adejenughure	4 February 2007 (age 19)	2	0	(Austrian Football Association) FC Liefering
21	FW	Thierry Tazemeta	27 July 2007 (age 19)	1	0	(German Football Association) 1. FC Kaiserslautern

=== Recent call-ups ===
The following players have also been called up to the squad in the last twelve months and are still eligible for selection.

Pos.	Player	Date of birth (age)	Caps	Goals	Club	Latest call-up

== Former coaches ==
- (Austria) Gustl Starek (1985–1987)
- (Austria) Ernst Weber (1996–1999)
- (Austria) Willibald Ruttensteiner (2001–2005)
- (Austria) Gerhard Hitzel (2005)
- (Austria) Willibald Ruttensteiner (2005–2006)
- (Austria) Manfred Zsak (2006–2009)
- (Austria) Andreas Herzog (2009–2011)

== See also ==
- Austria national football team
- Austria national under-19 football team
- Austria national under-17 football team
