= Luca Weinhandl =

Austrian footballer (born 2009)

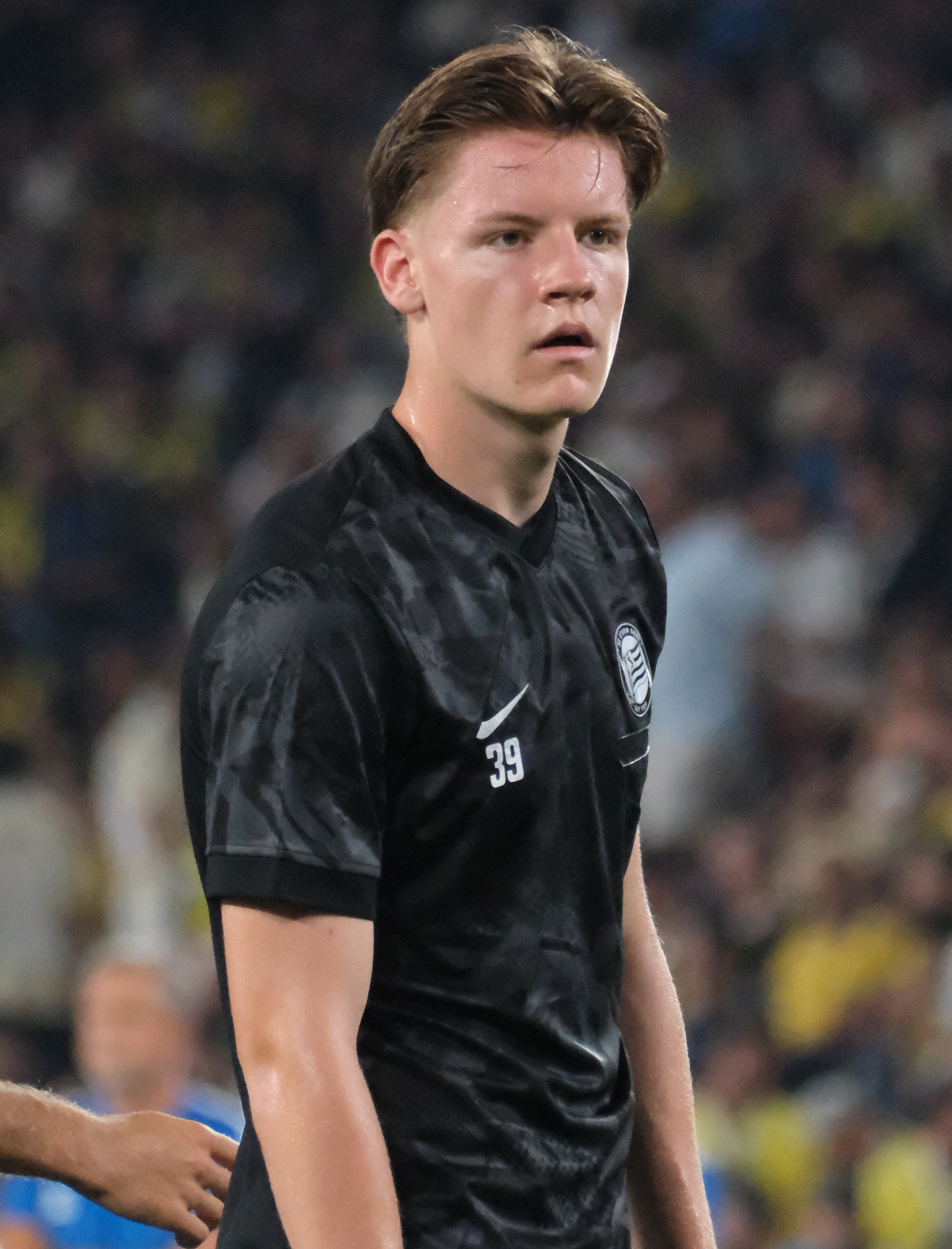
- Weinhandl with Sturm Graz in 2026

Personal information
- Date of birth: 11 January 2009 (age 17)
- Place of birth: Graz, Austria
- Height: 1.90 m (6 ft 3 in)
- Position: Midfielder

Team information
- Current team: Sturm Graz
- Number: 39

Youth career
- –2014: SV Wildon
- 2015–2025: Sturm Graz

Senior career*
Years	Team	Apps	(Gls)
2024–	Sturm Graz II	20	(2)
2025–	Sturm Graz	18	(2)

International career^{‡}
2024	Austria U15	6	(0)
2024	Austria U16	4	(1)
2025–	Austria U17	13	(0)
2026–	Austria U19	5	(1)
2026–	Austria	1	(0)
Medal record
Men's football
Representing Austria
FIFA U-17 World Cup
Runner-up	2025 Qatar
- * Club domestic league appearances and goals as of 25 October 2026 ‡ National team caps and goals as of 17 November 2026

Luca Weinhandl (born 11 January 2009) is an Austrian professional footballer who plays as a midfielder for Austrian Bundesliga club Sturm Graz and the Austria national team.

== Early life ==
Weinhandl was born on 11 January 2009 in Graz, Austria. Born in Austria, he is a native of Styria, Austria.

== Club career ==
As a youth player, Weinhandl joined the youth academy of SV Wildon. Following his stint there, he joined the youth academy of Sturm Graz in 2015 and was promoted to the club's senior team in 2025.

== International career ==
Weinhandl is an Austria youth international. During November 2025, he played for the Austria under-17 national team at the 2025 FIFA U-17 World Cup.

He was one of the players who were called up with the Austria national team by head coach Ralf Rangnick for the 2026–27 UEFA Nations League B matches against Republic of Ireland on 14 November and Israel on 17 November 2026.

== Style of play ==
Weinhandl plays as a midfielder. Austrian newspaper Kleine Zeitung wrote in 2025 "at 1.90 meters tall... [he] possesses extraordinary physical abilities".

== Career statistics ==
As of match played 29 October 2026

Appearances and goals by club, season and competition
Club	Season	League			Cup		Europe		Other		Total	
Club	Season	Division	Apps	Goals	Apps	Goals	Apps	Goals	Apps	Goals	Apps	Goals
Sturm Graz II	2024–25	2. Liga	9	0	—		—		—		9	0
Sturm Graz II	2025–26	2. Liga	10	1	—		—		—		10	1
Sturm Graz II	Total		19	1	—		—		—		19	1
Sturm Graz	2025–26	Austrian Bundesliga	10	1	1	0	2 (Note: Appearances in UEFA Europa League)	0	—		13	1
Sturm Graz	2026–27	Austrian Bundesliga	9	1	3	0	6 (Note: Four appearances and one goal in UEFA Champions League, two appearances in UEFA Europa League)	1	—		18	2
Sturm Graz	Total		19	2	4	0	8	1	—		31	3
Career total			38	3	4	0	8	1	0	0	50	4

=== International ===
As of match played 17 November 2026

Appearances and goals by national team and year
National team	Year	Apps	Goals
Austria	2026	1	0
Total		1	0

== Honours ==
Austria U17

- FIFA U-17 World Cup runner-up: 2025
