= Arjan Malić =

Bosnian footballer (born 2005)

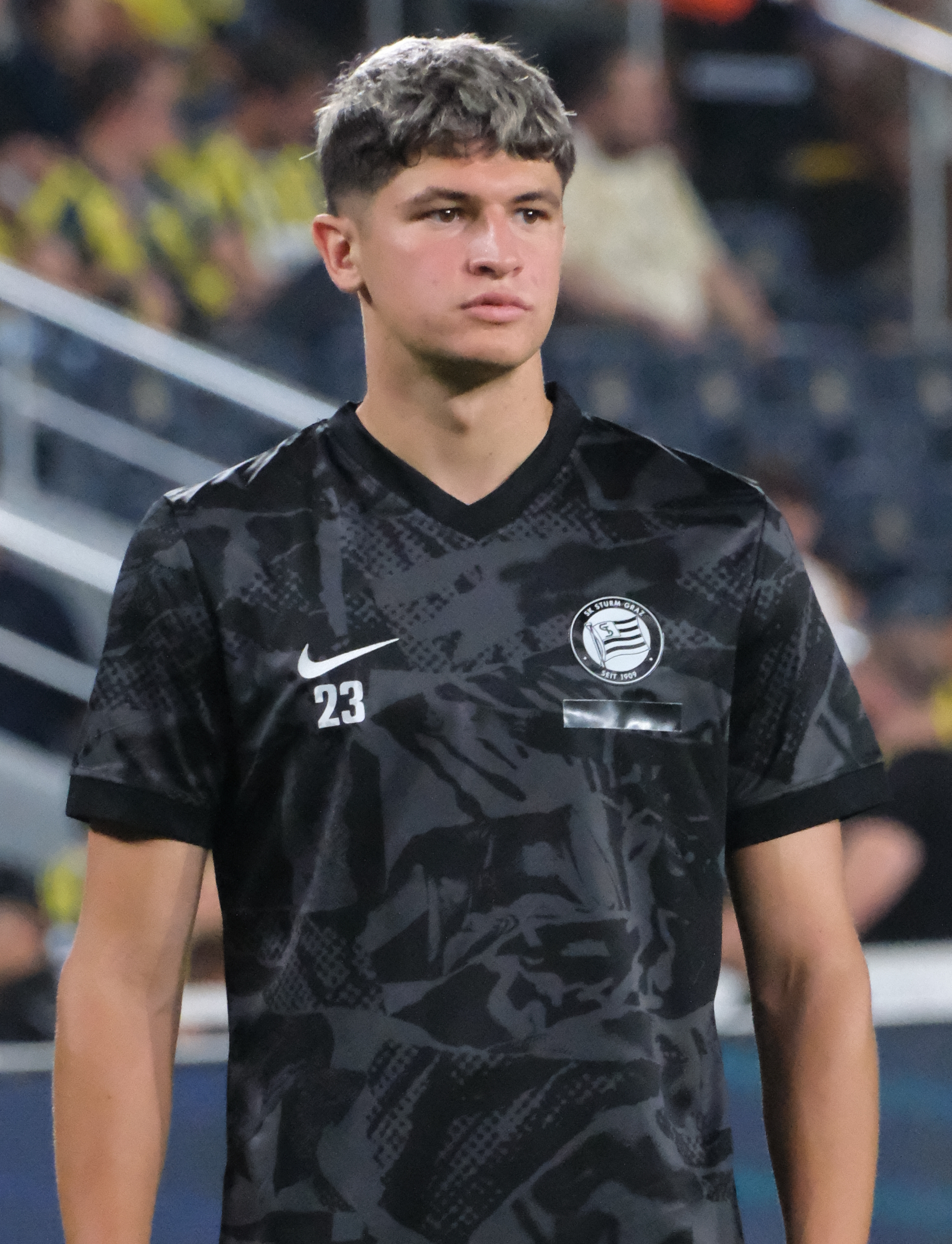
- Malić with Sturm Graz in 2026

Personal information
- Date of birth: 28 August 2005 (age 21)
- Place of birth: Jesenice, Slovenia
- Height: 1.86 m (6 ft 1 in)
- Position: Centre-back

Team information
- Current team: Sturm Graz
- Number: 23

Youth career
- 2014–2023: Ried

Senior career*
Years	Team	Apps	(Gls)
2023	Ried II	13	(0)
2023–2024	Ried	29	(0)
2025–	Sturm Graz	37	(1)

International career^{‡}
2023–2024	Slovenia U19	8	(0)
2024–2026	Bosnia and Herzegovina U21	2	(0)
2025–	Bosnia and Herzegovina	11	(0)
- * Club domestic league appearances and goals as of 8 November 2026 ‡ National team caps and goals as of 17 November 2026

Arjan Malić (pronounced [ǎrjan mâːlitɕ]; born 28 August 2005) is a professional footballer who plays as a centre-back for Austrian Bundesliga club Sturm Graz. Born in Slovenia, he plays for the Bosnia and Herzegovina national team.

Malić started his professional career at Ried, playing first in its reserve team, before joining Sturm Graz in 2024.

Malić represented Slovenia and Bosnia and Herzegovina at youth levels, but decided to represent the latter at the senior level. He made his senior international debut in 2025, earning 11 caps since, and represented the nation at the 2026 FIFA World Cup.

== Club career ==
=== Early career ===
Malić came through Ried's youth setup, which he joined in 2014. He made his professional debut against FAC on 30 July 2023 at the age of 17. On 1 March 2024, he scored his first professional goal in a triumph over Stripfing.

=== Sturm Graz ===
In June, Malić was transferred to Sturm Graz for an undisclosed fee. He made his official debut for the team against Red Bull Salzburg on 6 October.

Malić debuted in the UEFA Champions League away at Lille on 11 December. Six weeks later, he scored his first goal in the competition against RB Leipzig, which was his first goal for Sturm Graz.

He won his first trophy with the club on 24 May, when they were crowned league champions.

On 14 December, he scored his first league goal against Austria Wien.

== International career ==
Despite representing Slovenia at the under-19 level, Malić decided to play for Bosnia and Herzegovina at the senior level. He was first part of the Bosnia and Herzegovina under-21 team.

In March 2025, he received his first senior call up, for 2026 FIFA World Cup qualifiers against Romania and Cyprus. He debuted against the former on 21 March.

In June 2026, Malić was named in Bosnia and Herzegovina's squad for the 2026 FIFA World Cup. He made his tournament debut in the last group game against Qatar on 24 June.

== Career statistics ==
=== Club ===
As of match played 8 November 2026

Appearances and goals by club, season and competition
Club	Season	League			Austrian Cup		Continental		Total	
Club	Season	Division	Apps	Goals	Apps	Goals	Apps	Goals	Apps	Goals
Ried II	2022–23	Austrian Regionalliga Central	13	0	–		–		2	0
Ried	2023–24	2. Liga	29	1	2	0	–		31	1
Sturm Graz	2024–25	Austrian Bundesliga	11	0	2	0	3 (Note: Appearances in UEFA Champions League)	1	16	1
Sturm Graz	2025–26	Austrian Bundesliga	18	1	3	0	7 (Note: Two appearances in UEFA Champions League; five appearances in UEFA Europa League)	0	28	1
Sturm Graz	2026–27	Austrian Bundesliga	8	0	2	0	7 (Note: Three appearances in UEFA Champios League; four appearances in UEFA Europa League)	0	17	0
Sturm Graz	Total		37	1	7	0	17	1	61	2
Career total			79	2	9	0	17	1	105	3

=== International ===
As of match played 17 November 2026

Appearances and goals by national team and year
National team	Year	Apps	Goals
Bosnia and Herzegovina
Bosnia and Herzegovina	2025	6	0
Bosnia and Herzegovina	2026	5	0
Total		11	0

== Honours ==
Sturm Graz

- Austrian Bundesliga: 2024–25
