= SK Sturm Graz =

Austrian professional football club

Sturm Graz
- Full name: Sportklub Sturm Graz
- Nickname: Die Schwoazn (The Blacks)
- Founded: 1 May 1909; 117 years ago as Grazer Fußballclub Sturm
- Ground: Merkur Arena
- Capacity: 16,364; 15,400 (international games)
- President: Christian Jauk
- Head coach: Fabio Ingolitsch
- League: Austrian Bundesliga
- 2025–26: Austrian Bundesliga, 2nd of 12
- Website: sksturm.at
Home colours	Away colours	Third colours

Sportklub Sturm Graz ([ʃtʊʁm ɡʁaːts], lit. 'Graz Storm') is an Austrian professional association football club, based in Graz, playing in the Austrian Football Bundesliga. The club was founded in 1909. Its colours are black and white.

In its history, Sturm Graz has won the Austrian football championship five times, in 1998, 1999, 2011, 2024 and 2025, and participated several times in the UEFA Champions League and UEFA Europa League. Their biggest rivals are Graz neighbours Grazer AK, with whom they share their stadium, the Merkur Arena.

== History ==
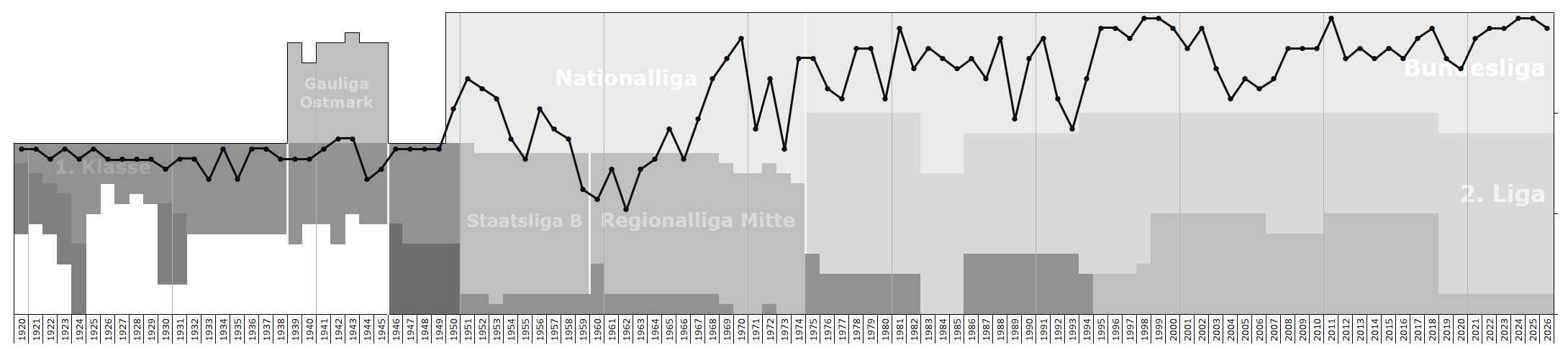
Historical chart of Sturm Graz league performance

=== Foundation ===
SK Sturm Graz was founded in 1909 by students, just like its neighbours Grazer AK, founded in 1902. Its initial name was Grazer Fußballclub Sturm. Between 1921 and 1949, the team enjoyed considerable success in winning the regional Styrian championship 11 times.

The Anschluss in 1938 made Austria part of the German Third Reich and Austrian clubs became part of German football competition. Sturm played in the opening round of the 1940 Tschammerpokal, predecessor to the modern-day DFB-Pokal. They then qualified to play in the Gauliga Ostmark, one of Germany's top-flight regional leagues, in 1941. The team withdrew part way through the 1941–42 season and was relegated after an 11th-place result in the following campaign.

In 1949, Sturm entered the Austrian national league as the first non-Vienna-based team.

=== 1981: First success ===
The first great success came under manager Otto Barić, when the club finished runners-up in the league in the 1980–81 season. In 1983–84, the club battled through to the quarter-finals of the UEFA Cup, beaten only by Nottingham Forest through a penalty in extra-time.

=== 1992: Start of a new era ===
In December 1992, Hannes Kartnig was installed as president, naming his close friend Heinz Schilcher as new manager. At the time, Sturm was languishing under enormous debts. Sturm qualified for the newly formed Zehnerliga, and Kartnig and Schilcher decided the best course of action would be to abstain from big-name signings, opting instead for a new start using young players from the club's youth setup. In 1993, Milan Đuričić became manager.

=== 1994 to 2002: Osim and European football ===
In 1994, the Bosnian Ivica Osim took control of the up-to-now unsuccessful Sturm; this proved to be a crucial turning-point in the club's history. Osim succeeded in producing an effective and powerful team using the young and inexperienced players at his disposal, strengthened with a few experienced leading players. The team's first success was as runners-up in the league in 1995. One year later, they won their first title, beating Admira Wacker in the cup final, but wobbling in the league to finish runners-up yet again.

In 1998, Sturm won its first Austrian Bundesliga title, pulling away from the field early on and winning the title with seven games in hand. Sturm set two records during this season; they remained unbeaten in their first 12 matches, and then for another 19 matches later in the season. At the end of the season, they amassed 81 points, an Austrian record total, winning the title with 19 points ahead of Rapid Wien. This season also saw the development of the "magic triangle" of Mario Haas, Hannes Reinmayr and Ivica Vastić.

The year 1999 saw Sturm Graz retain the title, securing the treble as they did so (league, cup and super cup), in addition to appearing in the qualification for the UEFA Champions League. Here, however, a scoreless draw with Spartak Moscow proved to be the team's only success. The 1999–2000 season saw Sturm in the Champions League for a second time, finishing third in its group. FC Tirol wrested the domestic title from Sturm's grasp, but the runners-up spot achieved was sufficient for a third trip into the following season's Champions League.

Sensationally, Sturm Graz won its Champions League Group D (against Galatasaray, Rangers and Monaco), reaching the second round for the first time. The league campaign was less successful – a fourth-place finish, the worst under Osim.

After the Champions League exploits, several key players out of the 12 who later left were not suitably replaced. Worse still, this hasty squad redevelopment devoured almost all the profit made from the European campaign. Only a small fraction of the money was invested in youth development to establish an academy. Despite this, the newly assembled team again finished in second place in the league, but failed at the qualification hurdle for the Champions League. This, together with increasing criticism from the club president, precipitated the departure of Osim after eight years at the helm.

=== 2002 to 2009: Consolidation ===
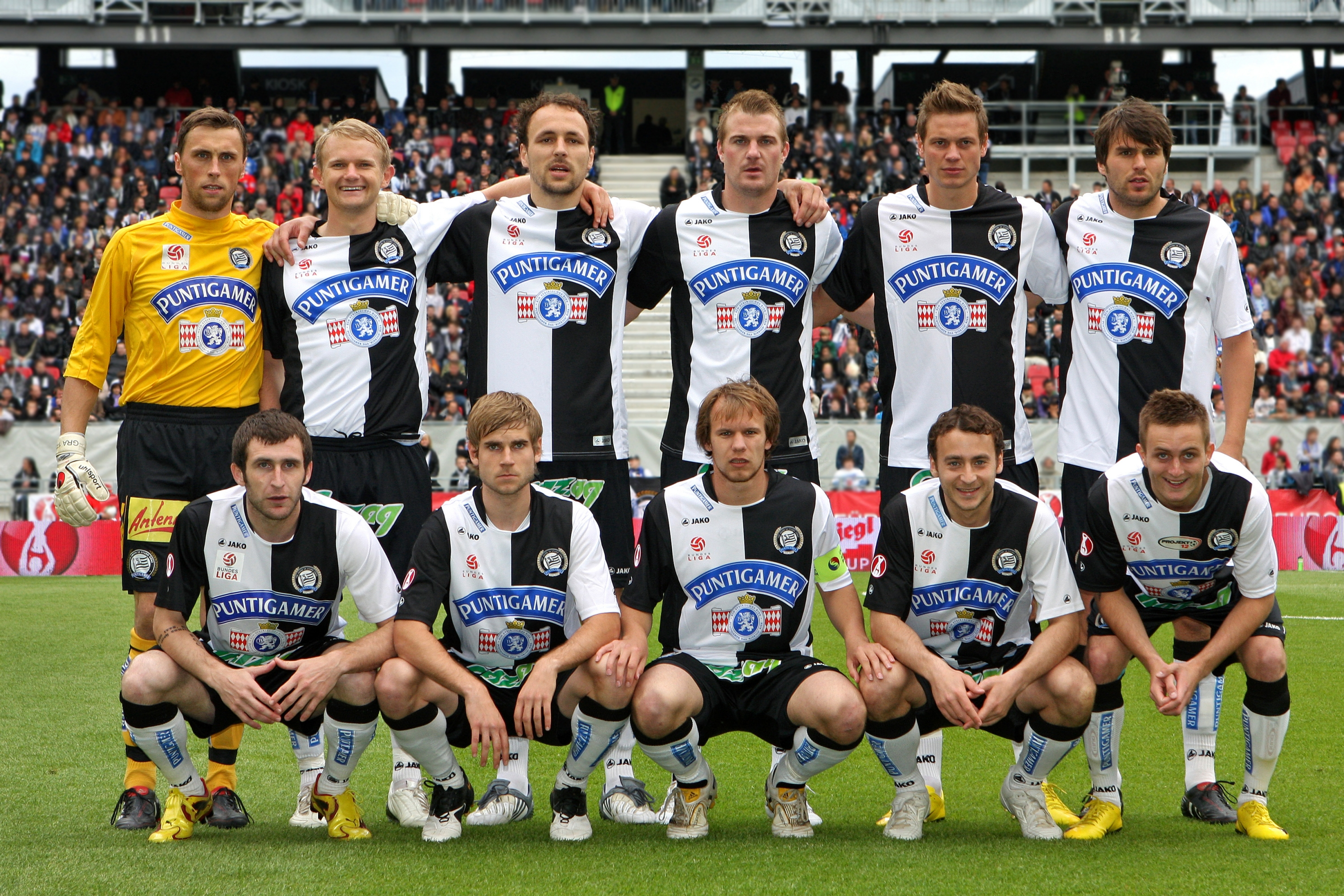
Sturm Graz, 2010 cup winners

Franco Foda and Gilbert Gress (seven defeats in nine games) both enjoyed short and fruitless stints as coach, before former sweeper Mihailo Petrović took control in autumn 2003. He presided over a gradual introduction of young talent, securing the team's place in the top flight in both 2004 and 2005, finishing in seventh position.

Since 2005, Sturm has been facing financial problems and, on 1 September 2006, a petition of bankruptcy was filed by the tax authorities. Because of the financial situation, Sturm was forced to use young players who were soon sold to reconsole the club. Also in 2006, coach Mihailo Petrović left the club and was replaced by Franco Foda.

=== 2009 to present day: New successes ===
Former logo

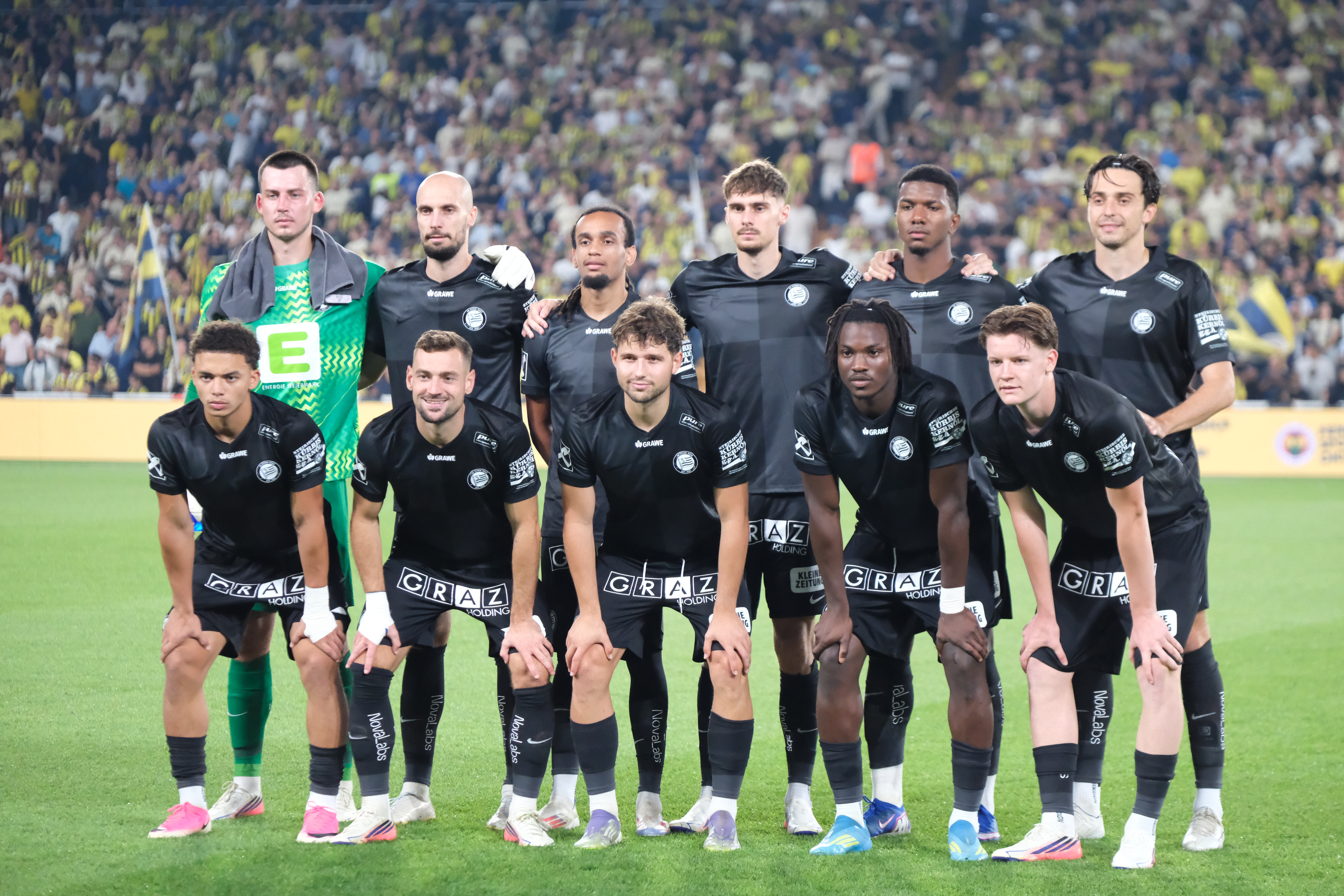
Sturm Graz squad against to Fenerbahçe in 2026 August at Şükrü Saracoğlu Stadium

After a fourth-place finish in 2009, the Blackies qualified for the group stage of the UEFA Europa League in 2009–10. Their opponents were Galatasaray, Panathinaikos and Dinamo București. In 2010, the Blackies won the ÖFB-Cup in Klagenfurt in front of 25,000 of its own fans against Wiener Neustadt. That was the highest number of fans ever travelling to a match in a different state.

In 2010–11, Sturm won the Austrian championship. A highlight of the season was a qualifying match against Juventus in the UEFA Europa League.

In 2011–12, Sturm played in the UEFA Champions League qualification rounds and managed to defeat Hungarian club Videoton and Zestaponi of Georgia. In the play-off, however, Sturm Graz lost against BATE Borisov, thus ensuring qualification to the group stages of the Europa League, where they were grouped with Anderlecht, Lokomotiv Moscow and AEK Athens. At the end of the season, Sturm finished fifth in the Bundesliga and head coach Franco Foda was fired after six years. With his replacement Peter Hyballa, Sturm played strong during the autumn months, but a poor spring resulted in Hyballa's dismissal before the end of the season. Sturm managed to fourth in the final league table, albeit with the lowest number of points ever sufficed for fourth place. This ensured Europa League qualification for the subsequent year. Darko Milanič, who won several titles with Maribor in Slovenia, took the reins of the club for the 2013–14 campaign. In the 2023–24 season, Sturm Graz clinched their fourth league title after a 2–0 win over Austria Klagenfurt on the final matchday, ending Red Bull Salzburg dominance for the last decade, in addition to securing a Champions League group stage berth for the first time since 2000–01.

== Stadium ==
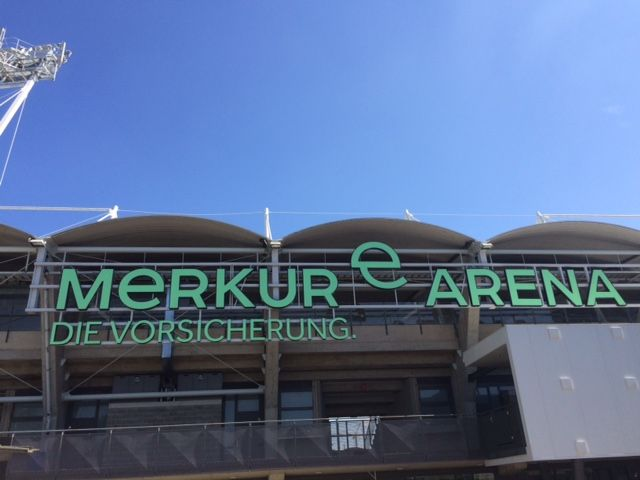
Merkur Arena

The traditional home of the team for many years was the Gruabn, which held over 12,000 people – almost exclusively standing – and which was characterised by its narrow playing field and the proximity of the fans to the players. From 1997 to 2005, Gruabn was used just as a training ground and for youth and amateur matches. In 2005, the ground was sold to the city of Graz to relieve the club's financial difficulties. The year 1997 saw the club's move to the Arnold Schwarzenegger Stadium, shared between Sturm and its local rivals, Grazer AK. From February 2006, the stadium was called UPC-Arena. In July 2016, Merkur Insurance won the Sponsoring rights for the stadium. The stadium is now called the Merkur Arena.

== Fans and the Graz Derby ==
A study published in 2008 by the German market research institute Sport + Markt showed that Sturm have around 360,000 fans across Austria, which is only second to the number of Rapid Wien supporters. In Europe, there are estimated to be 410,000 fans, which ranks them as the 117th-most supported club.

There are several organised fan groups- a few ones are Jewels Sturm and the Brigata Graz, which were both founded in 1994, and Grazer Sturmflut, founded two years later in 1996.

Sturm fans have a friendship with fans of German 2. Bundesliga club Karlsruhe. They have also contacts with fans of Werder Bremen and fans from Pisa and Carrara in the Italian league. More recently, they have also had contacts with a group of Maribor ultras.

Sturm have a big rivalry with cross-town rivals Grazer AK, with whom they compete the Graz Derby. In 1974, there was big opposition from both sets of fans against a proposed merger to become "FC Graz." Since 1920, excluding the friendly matches (especially before the first official Styrian Cup in 1920), 199 matches have been played between the two, of which there were 185 encounters in the league (130 at the professional level and 55 at amateur level in the Styrian League); an additional seven encounters in the Austrian Cup; one match in the Austrian Supercup; two meetings in the Tschammerpokal and four games in the Styrian Cup. The first Derby took place in 1911, the last was dated 2 Nov 2023. So far, Sturm have won more derby matches than Grazer AK.

Other rivalries are with the two Vienna clubs (Austria Wien and Rapid Wien) due to the history of competition for trophies between the three clubs, and as with most ultras the fans have a strong dislike of Red Bull Salzburg, unhappy with the acquisition of Austria Salzburg by Austrian energy drink company Red Bull.

== Honours ==
Type	Competition	Titles	Seasons
Domestic	Austrian Bundesliga	5	1997–98, 1998–99, 2010–11, 2023–24, 2024–25
Domestic	Austrian Cup	7	1995–96, 1996–97, 1998–99, 2009–10, 2017–18, 2022–23, 2023–24
Domestic	Austrian Supercup	3	1996, 1998, 1999

=== Other Titles ===
- UEFA Intertoto Cup
  - Winners (1): 2008 (Joint Winner)
- Austrian Amateur Champions
  - Winners (1): 1934

=== Runners-up ===
- Austrian Bundesliga
  - Runners-up (9): 1980–81, 1994–95, 1995–96, 1999–2000, 2001–02, 2017–18, 2021–22, 2022–23, 2025–26
- Austrian Cup
  - Runners-up (4): 1947–48, 1974–75, 1997–98, 2001–02
- Austrian Supercup
  - Runners-up (2): 1997, 2002

=== Participants ===
- UEFA Champions League (4 participations): 1998–99, 1999–2000, 2000–01 (2nd Group stage), 2024–25
- UEFA Cup (12 participations): 1970–71, 1974–75, 1978–79, 1981–82, 1983–84 (Quarter-finals), 1988–89, 1991–92, 1995–96, 1999–2000, 2002–03, 2026–27

== European record ==
- Q= Qualifying
- P= Preliminary
- PO = Play-off
- KPO = Knockout play-offs
- R16 = Round of 16
- QF = Quarter-finals

Season	Competition	Round	Country	Opponent	Home	Away	Aggregate
1970–71	Inter-Cities Fairs Cup	1	(Finland)	Ilves	3–0	2–4	5–4
1970–71	Inter-Cities Fairs Cup	2	(England)	Arsenal	1–0	0–2	1–2
1974–75	UEFA Cup	1	(Belgium)	Antwerp	2–1	0–1	2–2 (a)
1975–76	UEFA Cup Winners' Cup	1	(Bulgaria)	Slavia Sofia	3–1	0–1	3–2
1975–76	UEFA Cup Winners' Cup	2	(Hungary)	Szombathelyi Haladás	2–0	1–1	3–1
1975–76	UEFA Cup Winners' Cup	QF	(West Germany)	Eintracht Frankfurt	0–2	0–1	0–3
1978–79	UEFA Cup	1	(West Germany)	Borussia Mönchengladbach	1–2	1–5	2–7
1981–82	UEFA Cup	1	(Soviet Union)	CSKA Moscow	1–0	1–2	2–2 (a)
1981–82	UEFA Cup	2	(Sweden)	IFK Göteborg	2–2	2–3	4–5
1983–84	UEFA Cup	1	(Romania)	Sportul Studențesc	0–0	2–1	2–1
1983–84	UEFA Cup	2	(Italy)	Hellas Verona	0–0	2–2	2–2 (a)
1983–84	UEFA Cup	3	(East Germany)	Lokomotive Leipzig	2–0	0–1	2–1
1983–84	UEFA Cup	QF	(England)	Nottingham Forest	1–1 (a.e.t.)	0–1	1–2
1988–89	UEFA Cup	1	(Switzerland)	Servette	0–0	0–1	0–1
1991–92	UEFA Cup	1	(Netherlands)	Utrecht	0–1	1–3	1–4
1995–96	UEFA Cup	Q	(Czech Republic)	Slavia Prague	0–1	1–1	1–2
1996–97	UEFA Cup Winners' Cup	1	(Czech Republic)	Sparta Prague	2–2	1–1	3–3
1997–98	UEFA Cup Winners' Cup	1	(Cyprus)	APOEL	3–0	1–0	4–0
1997–98	UEFA Cup Winners' Cup	2	(Greece)	AEK Athens	1–0	0–2	1–2
1998–99	UEFA Champions League	Q2	(Hungary)	Újpest	4–0	3–2	7–2
1998–99	UEFA Champions League	Group C	(Russia)	Spartak Moscow	0–2	0–0	4th
1998–99	UEFA Champions League	Group C	(Italy)	Internazionale	0–2	0–1	4th
1998–99	UEFA Champions League	Group C	(Spain)	Real Madrid	1–5	1–6	4th
1999–2000	UEFA Champions League	Q3	(Switzerland)	Servette	2–1	2–2	4–3
1999–2000	UEFA Champions League	Group D	(France)	Marseille	3–2	0–2	3rd
1999–2000	UEFA Champions League	Group D	(England)	Manchester United	0–3	1–2	3rd
1999–2000	UEFA Champions League	Group D	(Croatia)	Croatia Zagreb	1–0	0–3	3rd
1999–2000	UEFA Cup	3	(Italy)	Parma	3–3 (a.e.t.)	1–2	4–5
2000–01	UEFA Champions League	Q2	(Israel)	Hapoel Tel Aviv	3–0	2–1	5–1
2000–01	UEFA Champions League	Q3	(Netherlands)	Feyenoord	2–1	1–1	3–2
2000–01	UEFA Champions League	Group D	(Scotland)	Rangers	2–0	0–5	1st
2000–01	UEFA Champions League	Group D	(Turkey)	Galatasaray	3–0	2–2	1st
2000–01	UEFA Champions League	Group D	(France)	Monaco	2–0	0–5	1st
2000–01	UEFA Champions League	Group A	(Spain)	Valencia	0–5	0–2	3rd
2000–01	UEFA Champions League	Group A	(England)	Manchester United	0–2	0–3	3rd
2000–01	UEFA Champions League	Group A	(Greece)	Panathinaikos	2–0	2–1	3rd
2001	UEFA Intertoto Cup	2	(Switzerland)	Lausanne	0–1	3–3	3–4
2002–03	UEFA Champions League	Q3	(Israel)	Maccabi Haifa	3–3	0–2	3–5
2002–03	UEFA Cup	1	(Scotland)	Livingston	5–2	3–4	8–6
2002–03	UEFA Cup	2	(Bulgaria)	Levski Sofia	1–0	0–1	1–1 (8–7 p)
2002–03	UEFA Cup	3	(Italy)	Lazio	1–3	1–0	2–3
2005	UEFA Intertoto Cup	1	(Andorra)	Rànger's	5–0	1–1	6–1
2005	UEFA Intertoto Cup	2	(Germany)	VfL Wolfsburg	1–3	2–2	3–5
2008	UEFA Intertoto Cup	2	(Belarus)	Shakhtyor Soligorsk	2–0	0–0	2–0
2008	UEFA Intertoto Cup	3	(Hungary)	Budapest Honvéd	0–0	2–1	2–1
2008–09	UEFA Cup	Q2	(Switzerland)	Zürich	1–1	1–1	2–2 (2–4 p)
2009–10	UEFA Europa League	Q2	(Bosnia and Herzegovina)	Široki Brijeg	2–1	1–1	3–2
2009–10	UEFA Europa League	Q3	(Montenegro)	Petrovac	5–0	2–1	7–1
2009–10	UEFA Europa League	PO	(Ukraine)	Metalist Kharkiv	1–1	1–0	2–1
2009–10	UEFA Europa League	Group F	(Romania)	Dinamo București	0–1	1–2	4th
2009–10	UEFA Europa League	Group F	(Turkey)	Galatasaray	1–0	1–1	4th
2009–10	UEFA Europa League	Group F	(Greece)	Panathinaikos	0–1	0–1	4th
2010–11	UEFA Europa League	Q3	(Georgia (country))	Dinamo Tbilisi	2–0	1–1	3–1
2010–11	UEFA Europa League	PO	(Italy)	Juventus	1–2	0–1	1–3
2011–12	UEFA Champions League	Q2	(Hungary)	Videoton	2–0	2–3	4–3
2011–12	UEFA Champions League	Q3	(Georgia (country))	Zestaponi	1–0	1–1	2–1
2011–12	UEFA Champions League	PO	(Belarus)	BATE Borisov	0–2	1–1	1–3
2011–12	UEFA Europa League	Group L	(Russia)	Lokomotiv Moscow	1–2	1–3	4th
2011–12	UEFA Europa League	Group L	(Greece)	AEK Athens	1–3	2–1	4th
2011–12	UEFA Europa League	Group L	(Belgium)	Anderlecht	0–2	0–3	4th
2013–14	UEFA Europa League	Q2	(Iceland)	Breiðablik	0–1	0–0	0–1
2015–16	UEFA Europa League	Q3	(Russia)	Rubin Kazan	2–3	1–1	3–4
2017–18	UEFA Europa League	Q2	(Montenegro)	Mladost Podgorica	0–1	3–0	3–1
2017–18	UEFA Europa League	Q3	(Turkey)	Fenerbahçe	1–2	1–1	2–3
2018–19	UEFA Champions League	Q2	(Netherlands)	Ajax	1–3	0–2	1–5
2018–19	UEFA Europa League	Q3	(Cyprus)	AEK Larnaca	0–2	0–5	0–7
2019–20	UEFA Europa League	Q2	(Norway)	Haugesund	2–1	0–2	2–3
2021–22	UEFA Europa League	PO	(Slovenia)	Mura	2–0	3–1	5–1
2021–22	UEFA Europa League	Group B	(France)	Monaco	1–1	0–1	4th
2021–22	UEFA Europa League	Group B	(Netherlands)	PSV Eindhoven	1–4	0–2	4th
2021–22	UEFA Europa League	Group B	(Spain)	Real Sociedad	0–1	1–1	4th
2022–23	UEFA Champions League	Q3	(Ukraine)	Dynamo Kyiv	1–2 (a.e.t.)	0–1	1–3
2022–23	UEFA Europa League	Group F	(Italy)	Lazio	0–0	2–2	4th
2022–23	UEFA Europa League	Group F	(Netherlands)	Feyenoord	1–0	0–6	4th
2022–23	UEFA Europa League	Group F	(Denmark)	Midtjylland	1–0	0–2	4th
2023–24	UEFA Champions League	Q3	(Netherlands)	PSV Eindhoven	1–3	1–4	2–7
2023–24	UEFA Europa League	Group D	(Portugal)	Sporting CP	1–2	0–3	3rd
2023–24	UEFA Europa League	Group D	(Poland)	Raków Częstochowa	0–1	1–0	3rd
2023–24	UEFA Europa League	Group D	(Italy)	Atalanta	2–2	0–1	3rd
2023–24	UEFA Europa Conference League	KPO	(Slovakia)	Slovan Bratislava	4–1	1–0	5–1
2023–24	UEFA Europa Conference League	R16	(France)	Lille	0–3	1–1	1–4
2024–25	UEFA Champions League	League phase	(France)	Brest	—N/a	1–2	30th
2024–25	UEFA Champions League	League phase	(Belgium)	Club Brugge	0–1	—N/a	30th
2024–25	UEFA Champions League	League phase	(Portugal)	Sporting CP	0–2	—N/a	30th
2024–25	UEFA Champions League	League phase	(Germany)	Borussia Dortmund	—N/a	0–1	30th
2024–25	UEFA Champions League	League phase	(Spain)	Girona	1–0	—N/a	30th
2024–25	UEFA Champions League	League phase	(France)	Lille	—N/a	2–3	30th
2024–25	UEFA Champions League	League phase	(Italy)	Atalanta	—N/a	0–5	30th
2024–25	UEFA Champions League	League phase	(Germany)	RB Leipzig	1–0	—N/a	30th
2025–26	UEFA Champions League	PO	(Norway)	Bodø/Glimt	2–1	0–5	2–6
2025–26	UEFA Europa League	League phase	(Denmark)	Midtjylland	—N/a	0–2	26th
2025–26	UEFA Europa League	League phase	(Scotland)	Rangers	2–1	—N/a	26th
2025–26	UEFA Europa League	League phase	(Scotland)	Celtic	—N/a	1–2	26th
2025–26	UEFA Europa League	League phase	(England)	Nottingham Forest	0–0	—N/a	26th
2025–26	UEFA Europa League	League phase	(Greece)	Panathinaikos	—N/a	1–2	26th
2025–26	UEFA Europa League	League phase	(Serbia)	Red Star Belgrade	0–1	—N/a	26th
2025–26	UEFA Europa League	League phase	(Netherlands)	Feyenoord	—N/a	0–3	26th
2025–26	UEFA Europa League	League phase	(Norway)	Brann	1–0	—N/a	26th
2026–27	UEFA Champions League	Q2	(Scotland)	Heart of Midlothian	4–0	2–0	6–0
2026–27	UEFA Champions League	Q3	(Turkey)	Fenerbahçe	0–1	0–2	0–3

== Players ==
=== Current squad ===
As of 24 October 2026

Note: Flags indicate national team as defined under FIFA eligibility rules; some limited exceptions apply. Players may hold more than one non-FIFA nationality.

No.	Pos.	Nation	Player
4	MF	SLO	Jon Gorenc Stanković (captain)
5	DF	AUT	Albert Vallçi
8	MF	POL	Filip Rózga
9	FW	CRO	Leon Grgić
10	MF	GEO	Otar Kiteishvili
11	FW	COD	Axel Kayombo
14	FW	CIV	Oumar Diakité (on loan from Reims)
15	MF	GEO	Gizo Mamageishvili
17	FW	POL	Szymon Włodarczyk
18	DF	ENG	Emran Soglo
19	MF	AUT	Simon Seidl
20	FW	NOR	Seedy Jatta
21	DF	SRB	Petar Petrović

No.	Pos.	Nation	Player
22	GK	AUT	Ammar Helać
23	DF	BIH	Arjan Malić
26	FW	AUT	Belmin Beganović
27	DF	VEN	Luis Balbo
28	DF	AUT	Jürgen Heil
30	DF	AUT	Paul Koller
35	DF	AUT	Niklas Geyrhofer
39	MF	AUT	Luca Weinhandl
41	GK	AUT	Elias Lorenz
43	MF	AUT	Jacob Hödl
44	FW	GER	Nelson Weiper (on loan from Mainz 05)
53	GK	RUS	Daniil Khudyakov
79	MF	KOS	Valmir Matoshi
—	GK	CZE	Adam Stejskal

=== Out on loan ===
Note: Flags indicate national team as defined under FIFA eligibility rules; some limited exceptions apply. Players may hold more than one non-FIFA nationality.

No.	Pos.	Nation	Player
—	MF	DEN	Julius Beck (at IF Elfsborg until 31 December 2026)
—	MF	AUT	Tim Huber (at SC Kalsdorf until 30 June 2027)

No.	Pos.	Nation	Player
—	MF	FRA	Anis Mathurin (at SC Kalsdorf until 30 June 2027)
—	FW	ANG	Daniel Sumbu (at Borussia Dortmund II until 30 June 2027)

=== Reserve team ===
Sturm Graz II

As of 5 February 2026 are the reserve team of SK Sturm Graz. They currently play in the second-level football league in Austria Admiral 2nd League.

Note: Flags indicate national team as defined under FIFA eligibility rules; some limited exceptions apply. Players may hold more than one non-FIFA nationality.

No.	Pos.	Nation	Player
1	GK	AUT	Nils Donat
2	DF	MAR	Smail Bakhty
4	DF	FRA	Ismaël Jabateh
5	DF	AUT	David Burger
6	DF	AUT	Gabriel Haider
9	FW	GER	Dennis Jastrzembski
10	MF	GHA	Lord Afrifa
11	MF	AUT	Thomas Gurmann
13	DF	AUT	Jonas Wolf
15	MF	AUT	Janne Gratzei
17	MF	AUT	Jonas Löcker
21	DF	AUT	Tizian-Valentino Scharmer
27	DF	AUT	Sebastian Pirker
29	MF	MLI	Youba Koïta

No.	Pos.	Nation	Player
30	DF	BIH	Senad Mustafić
31	DF	GER	Barne Pernot
32	GK	AUT	Christoph Wiener-Pucher
33	MF	FRA	Wisler Lazarre
37	DF	SLO	Kristjan Bendra
38	FW	AUT	Jonas Peinhart
41	GK	AUT	Elias Lorenz
44	MF	GAM	Abdoulie Kanté
45	FW	ANG	Daniel Sumbu
47	FW	AUT	Richmond Osayantin
56	MF	AUT	Jonas Petritsch
57	MF	CRO	Mate Grgić
60	MF	AUT	Jakob Ploner
66	DF	AUT	Louis Morgenstern

=== Retired numbers ===
Note: Flags indicate national team as defined under FIFA eligibility rules; some limited exceptions apply. Players may hold more than one non-FIFA nationality.

No.	Pos.	Nation	Player
3	DF	AUT	Günther Neukirchner (1989–2006)
7	FW	AUT	Mario Haas (1993–2012)

== Coaching staff ==
Position	Name
Head coach	(Austria) Fabio Ingolitsch
Assistent Coach	(Austria) Christoph Witamwas (Austria) Sargon Duran
Goalkeeper Coach	(Austria) Stefan Loch
Match Analyst	(Germany) Sebastian Podsiadly (Austria) Michele Stock
Development Coach	(Austria) Günther Neukirchner
Managing Director Sport	(Germany) Michael Parensen
Technical Director	(Germany) Benjamin Schunk
Scout	(Austria) Emil Bauer (Austria) Rasim Memić (Austria) Christoph Leitgeb
Director of youth department	(Austria) Thomas Raffl
Chief instructor	(Austria) Dietmar Pegam
Team Manager	(Austria) Martin Ehrenreich

== Managerial history ==
- (Austria) Leopold Kruschitz (1945–46)
- (Austria) Josef Molzer (1946–49)
- (Austria) Ludwig Durek (1950)
- (Austria) Franz Czernicky (1951–52)
- (Austria) (Germany) Karl Decker (1952–54)
- (Hungary) (Austria) Janos Gerdov (1954)
- (Austria) Hans Gmeindl (1955)
- (Austria) Rudolf Strittich (1 July 1955 – 30 June 1956)
- (Austria) Josef Blum (1956–58)
- (Austria) Ludwig Durek (1958–60)
- (Hungary) (Austria) János Szép (1960–61)
- (Austria) Otto Mühlbauer (1961)
- (Austria) August Rumpf (1961–62)
- (Hungary) (Austria) Lajos Lörinczy (1962–63)
- (Austria) August Rumpf (1963)
- (Austria) Rudolf Suchanek (1963–64)
- (Austria) Karl Adamek (1965–66)
- (Austria) Franz Fuchs (1966–67)
- (Austria) Karl Kowanz (1967)
- (Austria) Gerd Springer (1967–70)
- (Hungary) (Austria) János Szép (1970–71)
- (Austria) August Rumpf (1971)
- (Austria) Adolf Remy (1971–72)
- (Austria) Karl Schlechta (1972–77)
- (Austria) Dr. Günther Paulitsch (1977–80)
- (Socialist Federal Republic of Yugoslavia) Otto Barić (1 July 1980 – 30 June 1982)
- (Austria) Gernot Fraydl (1 July 1982 – 9 April 1984)
- (Austria) Robert Pflug (10 April 1984 – 23 September 1984)
- (Austria) Hermann Stessl (24 September 1984 – 30 June 1985)
- (Socialist Federal Republic of Yugoslavia) Ivan Marković (1 July 1985 – 12 October 1985)
- (Austria) Franz Mikscha (13 Oct 1985 – 30 June 1986)
- (Austria) Walter Ludescher (1 July 1986 – 24 September 1988)
- (Austria) Manfred Steiner (int.) (24 September 1988 – 31 October 1988)
- (Socialist Federal Republic of Yugoslavia) Otto Barić (1 Oct 1988 – 30 June 1989)
- (Austria) August Starek (1 July 1989 – 1 November 1991)
- (Austria) Robert Pflug (1 Nov 1991 – 1 October 1992)
- (Slovakia) Ladislav Jurkemik (1 Nov 1992 – 30 June 1993)
- (Croatia) Milan Đuričić (1 July 1993 – 30 June 1994)
- (Bosnia and Herzegovina) Ivica Osim (1 June 1994 – 14 September 2002)
- (Germany) Franco Foda (14 September 2002 – 31 May 2003)
- (Switzerland) Gilbert Gress (1 July 2003 – 31 August 2003)
- (Serbia and Montenegro) Mihailo Petrović (1 September 2003 – 31 May 2006)
- (Germany) Franco Foda (1 July 2006 – 12 April 2012)
- (Germany) Thomas Kristl (int.) (12 April 2012 – 31 May 2012)
- (Germany) Peter Hyballa (1 June 2012 – 22 April 2013)
- (Austria) Markus Schopp (int.) (22 April 2013 – 3 June 2013)
- (Slovenia) Darko Milanič (4 June 2013 – 23 September 2014)
- (Austria) Günther Neukirchner (int.) (23 September 2014 – 30 September 2014)
- (Germany) Franco Foda (30 September 2014 – 1 January 2018)
- (Germany) Heiko Vogel (1 January 2018 – 5 November 2018)
- (Austria) Günther Neukirchner (int.) (5 Nov 2018 – 12 November 2018)
- (Austria) Roman Mählich (12 Nov 2018 – 31 June 2019)
- (England) Nestor El Maestro (1 July 2019 – 25 June 2020)
- (Austria) Christian Ilzer (17 July 2020 – 15 Nov 2024)
- (Austria) Jürgen Säumel (15 Nov 2024 – present)
