= 2026–27 SC Rheindorf Altach season =

SC Rheindorf Altach
2026–27 season
- Manager: Ognjen Zarić
- Stadium: Stadion Schnabelholz
- Austrian Football Bundesliga: 12th
- Austrian Cup: Third round
- Top goalscorer: League: Patrick Greil; Yann Massombo (2 each); All: Yann Massombo (4)
- Highest home attendance: 5,132 (vs. TSV Hartberg, 22 August 2026)
- Lowest home attendance: 2,819 (vs. SK Bischofshofen, 4 September 2026)
- Average home league attendance: 4,771
- Biggest win: 7–0 (vs. SK Bischofshofen, 4 September 2026)
- Biggest defeat: 3–0 (vs. LASK, 29 August 2026)
- All statistics correct as of 12 September 2026.

The 2026–27 season is the 98th season in the history of SC Rheindorf Altach, and the club's thirteenth consecutive season in the Austrian Football Bundesliga. In addition to the domestic league, the team is scheduled to participate in the Austrian Cup.

== Transfers ==
=== In ===
Pos.	Player	Transferred from	Fee	Date	Source
FW	(Austria) Marko Raguž	Austria Wien	Free	18 May 2026	
MF	(Austria) Denizcan Cosgun	Austria Salzburg	Free	11 June 2026	
FW	(Japan) Shingo Nakano	(Singapore) FC Jurong	Free	16 June 2026	
DF	(Austria) Jakob Brandtner	(Austria) FC Liefering	Free	1 July 2026	
MF	(Austria) Yanis Eisschill	(Austria) SKU Amstetten	Undisclosed	1 July 2026	
DF	(Brazil) Henrique Bell	(Brazil) São Paulo	Undisclosed	1 July 2026	
DF	(Austria) Benjamin Böckle	(Austria) Rapid Wien	Undisclosed	2 July 2026	
FW	(Serbia) Srdjan Hrstić	(Sweden) BK Häcken	Undisclosed	17 July 2026	
DF	(Germany) Niklas Niehoff	(Germany) Holstein Kiel	Loan	18 July 2026	
FW	(Germany) Rodney Elongo-Yombo	(Germany) 1. FC Saarbrücken	Free	26 August 2026	
DF	(Austria) Johannes Naschberger		Free	14 September 2026	

=== Out ===
Pos.	Player	Transferred to	Fee	Date	Source
FW	(Albania) Anteo Fetahu	(Austria) SW Bregenz	Free	29 June 2026	
MF	(Austria) Alexander Gorgon	(Poland) Świt Szczecin	Free	30 June 2026	
DF	(Austria) Sandro Ingolitsch		Released	1 July 2026	
DF	(Austria) Lukas Gugganig		Released	1 July 2026	
MF	(Kosovo) Blendi Idrizi		Released	1 July 2026	
FW	(Austria) Luca Kronberger		Released	1 July 2026	
DF	(Burkina Faso) Mohamed Ouédraogo	(France) Lyon	€2,000,000	3 July 2026	
MF	(Austria) Diego Madritsch	(Austria) Blau-Weiß Linz	Free	2 September 2026	

== Friendlies ==
20 June 2026 Friendly	FC Hörbranz (Austria)	0–4	(Austria) SCR Altach	Hörbranz
18:00		Report	Yalcin 6', 25'; Jäger 56'; Nakano 61'

27 June 2026 Friendly	FC St. Gallen (Switzerland)	3–2	(Austria) SCR Altach	Widnau, Switzerland
16:00	Görtler 32'; Baldé 45'; Fazliji 61'	Report	Zech 36'; Massombo 57'	Stadium: Sportgelände Aegeten Widnau

4 July 2026 Friendly	SCR Altach (Austria)	1–2	(Germany) 1. FC Heidenheim	Koblach
16:00	Greil 57'	Report	Keller 34'; Wagner 60'	Stadium: Sportanlage Lohma Koblach

10 July 2026 Friendly	FC Vaduz (Liechtenstein)	0–1	(Austria) SCR Altach	Freiburg, Germany
16:00		Report	Milojević 41'	Stadium: Möslestadion

18 July 2026 Friendly	SCR Altach (Austria)	3–1	(Switzerland) Grasshoppers	Altach
16:30	Böckle 4'; Diawara 8'; Greil 68'	Report	Muci 19'	Stadium: Stadion Schnabelholz; Attendance: 1,500

19 July 2026 Friendly	FC Dornbirn (Austria)	Cancelled	(Austria) SCR Altach
15:00		Report

== Competitions ==
=== Overall record ===
Competition	First match	Last match	Starting round	Record							
Competition	First match	Last match	Starting round	Pld	W	D	L	GF	GA	GD	Win %
Austrian Football Bundesliga	2 August 2026		Matchday 1	7	1	0	6	5	12	−7	14.29
Austrian Cup	24 July 2026		First round	2	2	0	0	8	0	+8	100.00
Total				9	3	0	6	13	12	+1	33.33

Last updated: 19 September 2026
Source: Soccerway

=== Austrian Football Bundesliga ===
==== League table ====
Pos	Team	Pld	W	D	L	GF	GA	GD	Pts	Qualification
8	Austria Lustenau	12	3	2	7	15	30	−15	11	Qualification for the Relegation round
9	Grazer AK	12	2	4	6	9	29	−20	10	Qualification for the Relegation round
10	SCR Altach	12	3	1	8	11	20	−9	10	Qualification for the Relegation round
11	Austria Wien	12	2	2	8	11	23	−12	8	Qualification for the Relegation round
12	Wolfsberger	12	1	3	8	8	26	−18	6	Qualification for the Relegation round

Updated to match(es) played on 8 November 2026. Source: Austrian Football Bundesliga
Rules for classification: 1) Points; 2) Head-to-head record; 3) Goal difference; 4) Goals scored; 5) Matches won; 6) Away matches won; 7) Away goals scored.

==== Results summary ====
Overall								Home						Away					
Pld	W	D	L	GF	GA	GD	Pts	W	D	L	GF	GA	GD	W	D	L	GF	GA	GD
7	1	0	6	5	12	−7	3	1	0	2	5	5	0	0	0	4	0	7	−7

Last updated: 19 September 2026.
Source: ADMIRAL Bundesliga

==== Results by round ====
Round	1	2	3	4	5	6	7
Ground	A	H	A	H	A	H	A
Result	L	W	L	L	L	L	L
Position	10	6	7	11	11	12	

Updated to match(es) played on 19 September 2026. Source: ADMIRAL Bundesliga
A = Away; H = Home; W = Win; D = Draw; L = Loss

==== Matches ====
2 August 2026 1	Rapid Wien	1–0	SCR Altach	Wien
19:00	Dahl 4'	Report	Milojević (yellow card) 45'; Zech (yellow card) 60'	Stadium: Allianz Stadion; Attendance: 16,795; Referee: Jakob Semler

8 August 2026 2	SCR Altach	3–1	WSG Tirol	Altach
19:30	Greil 19', 87'; Massombo 56'; Niehoff (yellow card) 85'	Report	Murray (yellow card) 6'; Balić 14'	Stadium: Stadion Schnabelholz; Attendance: 5,029; Referee: Sebastian Gishamer

15 August 2026 3	SK Sturm Graz	1–0	SCR Altach	Graz
19:30	Jatta 78'	Report	Jäger (yellow card) 36'; Greil (yellow card) 40'	Stadium: Liebenauer Stadium; Attendance: 14,715; Referee: Florian Jäger

22 August 2026 4	SCR Altach	1–2	TSV Hartberg	Altach
17:00	Diawara 53'	Report	Gattermayer 16', (yellow card) 87'; Wilfinger (yellow card) 85'; Feldhofer (yellow card) 86'; Markuš 90+3'	Stadium: Stadion Schnabelholz; Attendance: 5,132; Referee: Walter Altmann

29 August 2026 5	LASK	3–0	SCR Altach	Linz
19:30	Lang 3', 19'; Mbuyamba (yellow card) 50'; Tornich (yellow card) 55'; Flecker 89'	Report	Diawara (yellow card) 47'; Demaku (yellow card) 53'; Greil (yellow card) 54'; Milojevic (yellow card) 66'	Stadium: Raiffeisen Arena; Attendance: 12,659; Referee: Alexander Harkam

12 September 2026 6	SCR Altach	1–2	Grazer AK	Altach
17:00	Massombo 25'; Jäger (yellow card) 74'	Report	Oberleitner 6'; Hofleitner 38', (yellow card) 90'	Stadium: Stadion Schnabelholz; Attendance: 4,152; Referee: Josef Spurny

19 September 2026 7	Austria Lustenau	2–0	SCR Altach	Lustenau
17:00	Anílson (yellow card) 7'; Afrifa (yellow card) 31'; Verinac 36'; Weixelbraun 45+1'; Delaye (yellow card) 70'; Diarra (yellow card) 84'	Report	Stojanović (yellow card) 84'	Stadium: Reichshofstadion; Attendance: 5,198; Referee: Stefan Ebner

=== Austrian Cup ===
24 July 2026 First round	SV Leobendorf	0–1	SCR Altach	Leobendorf
19:00	Beljan (yellow card) 41'; Pellegrini (yellow card) 79'	Report	Massombo 67'	Stadium: Sportplatz Leobendorf; Attendance: 400; Referee: Achim Untergasser

4 September 2026 Second round	SCR Altach	7–0	SK Bischofshofen	Altach
18:30	Massombo 9'; Jäger 26'; Diawara 27', 45'; Böckle 30'; Hrstić 56'; Elongo-Yombo 78'	Report	Celikovic (yellow card) 36'	Stadium: Stadion Schnabelholz; Attendance: 2,819; Referee: Stefan Macanovic

27 October 2026 Third round	Grazer AK	v	SCR Altach	Graz
18:30		Report		Stadium: Merkur-Arena

== Statistics ==
=== Appearances and goals ===
As of match played 19 September 2026

Players with no appearances are not included on the list
Italics indicate a loaned in player

No.	Pos	Nat	Player	Total		Bundesliga		Austrian Cup	
No.	Pos	Nat	Player	Apps	Goals	Apps	Goals	Apps	Goals
1	GK	(Austria) AUT	Dejan Stojanovic	9	0	7+0	0	2+0	0
4	DF	(Brazil) BRA	Henrique Bell	1	0	0+0	0	1+0	0
6	MF	(Austria) AUT	Vesel Demaku	9	0	7+0	0	2+0	0
7	MF	(Austria) AUT	Denizcan Cosgun	2	0	0+2	0	0+0	0
8	MF	(Germany) GER	Mike-Steven Bähre	9	0	7+0	0	2+0	0
9	FW	(Austria) AUT	Marko Raguž	6	0	1+3	0	0+2	0
10	FW	(Sweden) SWE	Ousmane Diawara	9	3	7+0	1	2+0	2
14	DF	(Austria) AUT	Johannes Naschberger	1	0	0+1	0	0+0	0
16	DF	(Sweden) SWE	Rassa Rahmani	4	0	2+0	0	2+0	0
17	DF	(Austria) AUT	Lukas Jäger	9	1	7+0	0	2+0	1
18	MF	(Austria) AUT	Patrick Greil	9	2	7+0	2	2+0	0
19	FW	(Serbia) SRB	Srdjan Hrstić	9	1	2+5	0	0+2	1
20	MF	(Austria) AUT	Erkin Yalcin	4	0	0+4	0	0+0	0
21	DF	(Austria) AUT	Jakob Brandtner	3	0	0+2	0	0+1	0
22	MF	(Austria) AUT	Yanis Eisschill	5	0	0+4	0	0+1	0
23	DF	(Austria) AUT	Benedikt Zech	6	0	5+0	0	1+0	0
27	DF	(Austria) AUT	Filip Milojevic	8	0	7+0	0	1+0	0
28	MF	(France) FRA	Yann Massombo	7	4	4+1	2	2+0	2
29	MF	(Germany) GER	Niklas Niehoff	9	0	7+0	0	1+1	0
32	MF	(Austria) AUT	Nemanja Krstovic	1	0	0+1	0	0+0	0
34	MF	(Austria) AUT	Adrian Vonbrül	1	0	0+0	0	0+1	0
37	DF	(Austria) AUT	Benjamin Böckle	9	1	7+0	0	2+0	1
39	FW	(Germany) GER	Rodney Elongo-Yombo	4	1	0+3	0	0+1	1
