= 2025–26 SK Sturm Graz season =

SK Sturm Graz
2025–26 season
- Manager: Jürgen Säumel
- Stadium: Liebenauer Stadium
- Austrian Bundesliga: 2nd
- Austrian Cup: Quarter-finals
- UEFA Champions League: Play-off round
- UEFA Europa League: League stage
- Top goalscorer: League: Otar Kiteishvili (15 goals); All: Otar Kiteishvili (19 goals)
Home colours	Away colours	Third colours

The 2025–26 season was the 117th season in the history of SK Sturm Graz, and the club's 60th consecutive season in the Austrian Bundesliga. In addition to the domestic league, the team participated in the Austrian Cup and the UEFA Europa League, having been eliminated in the play-off round of the UEFA Champions League.

== Transfers ==
=== In ===
Pos.	Player	Transferred from	Fee	Date	Source
FW	(Democratic Republic of the Congo) Axel Kayombo	(Switzerland) Basel	Undisclosed	1 July 2025	
MF	(Poland) Filip Rózga	(Poland) Cracovia	Undisclosed	1 July 2025	
MF	(Denmark) Julius Beck	(Denmark) Esbjerg fB	Undisclosed	1 July 2025	
DF	(Germany) Tim Oermann	(Germany) Bayer Leverkusen	Loan	1 July 2025	
GK	(Denmark) Oliver Christensen	(Italy) Fiorentina	Loan	2 August 2025	
FW	(Germany) Maurice Malone	Austria Wien	Undisclosed	2 September 2025	
DF	(Costa Rica) Jeyland Mitchell	(Netherlands) Feyenoord	Loan	2 September 2025	

=== Out ===
Pos.	Player	Transferred to	Fee	Date	Source
MF	(Switzerland) Gregory Wüthrich	(Switzerland) Young Boys	Free	1 July 2025	
DF	(Mali) Amadou Dante	(Portugal) Arouca	Undisclosed (Note: Previously on loan at Arouca)	1 July 2025	
MF	(Hungary) Martin Kern	(Hungary) Puskás Akadémia	Undisclosed	5 August 2025	
FW	(Mali) Amady Camara	(France) Nantes	Loan	9 August 2025	
FW	(Poland) Szymon Włodarczyk	(Netherlands) Excelsior	Loan	22 August 2025	
FW	(Denmark) William Bøving	(Germany) Mainz 05	Undisclosed	1 September 2025	
DF	(England) Emran Soglo	(Belgium) Zulte Waregem	Loan	8 September 2025	

== Competitions ==
=== Austrian Bundesliga ===
==== League table ====
Pos	Team	Pld	W	D	L	GF	GA	GD	Pts	Qualification
1	Sturm Graz	22	12	2	8	33	26	+7	38	Qualification for the Championship round
2	Red Bull Salzburg	22	10	7	5	42	26	+16	37	Qualification for the Championship round
3	LASK	22	11	4	7	32	30	+2	37	Qualification for the Championship round
4	Austria Wien	22	11	3	8	34	30	+4	36	Qualification for the Championship round
5	SK Rapid	22	9	6	7	26	25	+1	33	Qualification for the Championship round

Source: Austrian Football Bundesliga
Rules for classification: 1) Points; 2) Head-to-head record; 3) Goal difference; 4) Goals scored; 5) Matches won; 6) Away matches won; 7) Away goals scored.

==== Results summary ====
Overall								Home						Away					
Pld	W	D	L	GF	GA	GD	Pts	W	D	L	GF	GA	GD	W	D	L	GF	GA	GD
7	5	0	2	12	4	+8	15	2	0	2	5	3	+2	3	0	0	7	1	+6

Last updated: 28 September 2025.
Source: Bundesliga

==== Results by round ====
Round	1	2	3	4	5	6	7	8	9	10	11	12	13	14	15	16	17	18	19	20	21	22
Ground	A	H	A	A	A	H	A	H	A	A	H	A	H	H	A	H	A	H	A	H		
Result	W	L	W	W	L	W	W	W	W	W	L	L	D	L	W							
Position	2	5	5	3	5	2	2	2	1	1	2	4	3	3	2							

Updated to match(es) played on 30 November 2025. Source: ADMIRAL Bundesliga
A = Away; H = Home; W = Win; D = Draw; L = Loss

==== Matches ====
1 August 2024 1	LASK	0–2	Sturm	Linz
20:30		Report	Grgić 9'; Kiteishvili 12' (pen.)	Stadium: Raiffeisen Arena; Referee: Harald Lechner

10 August 2024 2	Sturm	1–2	Rapid	Graz
17:00	Marcelin 57' (o.g.)	Report	67' Dahl; 70' Mbuyi	Stadium: Liebenauer Stadium; Attendance: 16,250; Referee: Peter Altmann

16 August 2024 4	SV Ried	1–3	Sturm	Ried im Innkreis
19:30	Kiedl 13'	Report	Kiteishvili 16', 44'; Johnston 31'	Stadium: Josko Arena; Referee: Arnes Talic

30 August 2024 5	Grazer AK	0–3	Sturm	Graz
19:30	Koch (red card) 80'	Report	Jatta 41', 90+6'; Horvat 64'	Stadium: Liebenauer Stadium; Referee: Christian-Petru Ciochirca

14 September 2025 6	Sturm Graz	0–1	Austria Wien	Graz
17:00 CEST (UTC+2)		Report	Eggestein 22'	Stadium: Liebenauer Stadium; Attendance: 16,856; Referee: Markus Hameter

20 September 2025 7	Red Bull Salzburg	0–2	Sturm Graz	Salzburg
17:00 CEST (UTC+2)	Diabate (red card) 22'; Schlager (yellow card) 69'	Report	Karić (yellow card) 38'; Horvat 41'; Jatta 50'; Malone (yellow card) 86'	Stadium: Red Bull Arena; Attendance: 10,938; Referee: Stefan Ebner

28 September 2025 8	Sturm Graz	1–0	TSV Hartberg	Graz
14:30 CEST (UTC+2)	Vincze 90+5' (o.g.)	Report		Stadium: Liebenauer Stadium; Referee: Arnes Talic

5 October 2025 9	SCR Altach	0–2	Sturm Graz	Altach
15:30 CEST (UTC+2)	Jäger (yellow card) 4'; Diawara (yellow card) 75'; Ingolitsch (yellow card) 79'; Ingolitsch (yellow card) 86'	Report	Lavalée (yellow card) 28'; Aiwu (yellow card) 63'; Kiteishvili 85' (pen.); Mitchell (yellow card) 86'; Beck (yellow card) 88'; Christensen (yellow card) 90+3'; Beganović 90+5'	Stadium: CASHPOINT Arena; Attendance: 6,452; Referee: Isa Simsek

19 October 2025 10	Blau-Weiß Linz	3–4	Sturm Graz	Linz
14:30 CEST (UTC+2)	Ronivaldo 17'; Bakatukanda (yellow card) 30'; Weissman 75'; Fofana 84'; Moormann (yellow card) 90+2'	Report	Chukwuani 8'; Stanković (yellow card) 28'; Karić (yellow card) 45'; Malone 63'; Grgić 73'; Kiteishvili 87'; Rózga (yellow card) 90+2'	Stadium: Hofmann Personal Stadion; Attendance: 5,595; Referee: Walter Altmann

26 October 2025 11	Sturm Graz	1–3	Wolfsberger AC	Graz
14:30 CEST (UTC+2)	Lavalée (yellow card) 9'; Rózga 54'; Gorenc Stanković (yellow card) 90+5'	Report	Zukić 12' (yellow card) 89'; Baumgartner (yellow card) 17' (yellow-red card) 74'; Piesinger 19'; Renner 32'; Kojzek (yellow card) 90+4'; Wimmer (yellow card) 90+6'	Stadium: Liebenauer Stadium; Attendance: 16,603; Referee: Josef Spurny

2 November 2025 12	Rapid Wien	2–1	Sturm Graz	Vienna
17:00 CET (UTC+2)	Seidl 66'; Lavalée 75' (o.g.); Bolla (yellow card) 77'; Amane (yellow card) 86'; Gartler (yellow card) 90+5'; Gulliksen (yellow card) 90+6'	Report	Malone 39'; Lavalée (yellow card) 65'	Stadium: Allianz Stadion; Attendance: 24,766; Referee: Markus Hameter

9 November 2025 13	Sturm Graz	1–1	Red Bull Salzburg	Graz
17:00 CET (UTC+2)	Grgić 46'; Mitchell (yellow card) 90+4'	Report	Ratkov (yellow card) 44'; Vertessen 65'; Lainer (yellow card) 66'; Diabaté (yellow card) 81'	Stadium: Merkur-Arena; Attendance: 16,307; Referee: Stefan Ebner

23 November 2025 14	Sturm Graz	1–3	LASK	Graz
14:30 CET (UTC+2)	Kiteishvili 7'	Report	Jørgensen 25'; Usor 27'; Andrade (yellow card) 42'; Daněk 60'; Horvath (yellow card) 81'; Coulibaly (yellow card) 90+5'	Stadium: Merkur-Arena; Attendance: 15,476; Referee: Walter Altmann

30 November 2025 15	TSV Hartberg	0–1	Sturm Graz	Hartberg
14:30 CET (UTC+2)	Dominic Vincze (yellow card) 44'; Heil (yellow card) 79'; Spendlhofer (yellow card) 79'; Hülsmann (yellow card) 79'; Havel (yellow card) 90+6'; Schmid (red card) 90+7'	Report	Oermann (yellow card) 11'; Aiwu (yellow card) 27'; Kayombo (yellow card) 79'; Kiteishvili 81' (pen.); Malić (yellow card) 90+3'	Stadium: Profertil Arena Hartberg; Attendance: 4,982; Referee: Daniel Pfister

=== Austrian Cup ===
25 July 2025 First round	SK Bischofshofen	0–4	Sturm Graz	Bischofshofen
			Kiteishvili 9'; Safonov 11' (o.g.); Jatta 13'; Camara 86'	Stadium: Sportplatz Bischofshofen; Attendance: 1,499; Referee: Daniel Pfister

17 September 2025 Second round	SC Röthis	0–2	Sturm Graz	Röthis
19:30 CEST (UTC+2)			Rózga 26'; Malone 90'	Stadium: Sportplatz an der Ratz

29 October 2025 Third round	Admira Wacker	1–1 (a.e.t.) (9–10 p)	SK Sturm Graz	Maria Enzersdorf
18:00 CET (UTC+1)	Schmidt 11', (yellow card) 81'; Olsa (yellow card) 79'	Report	Jatta (yellow card) 57'; Meisl 73' (o.g.); Malić (yellow card) 102'	Stadium: Datenpol Arena; Attendance: 4,500; Referee: Harald Lechner
	Penalties
	Gemicibaşi (penalty scored); Malicsek (penalty scored); Weberbauer (penalty scored); Meisl (penalty scored); Steiner (penalty missed); Tambwe-Kasengele (penalty scored); Schabauer (penalty scored); Olsa (penalty scored); Holzhacker (penalty scored); Haudum (penalty scored); Siebenhandl (penalty missed)		Kiteishvili (penalty scored); Grgić (penalty missed); Horvat (penalty scored); Kayombo (penalty scored); Chukwuani (penalty scored); Malić (penalty scored); Lavalée (penalty scored) , (yellow card); Gorenc Stanković (penalty scored); Bignetti (penalty scored); Geyrhofer (penalty scored); Aiwu (penalty scored)

1 February 2026 Quarter-final	SCR Altach	3–1 (a.e.t.)	SK Sturm Graz	Altach
17:30 CET (UTC+1)	Greil 51', 105'; Ingolitsch (yellow card) 66'; Milojević (yellow card) 90+1'; Hrstić 102'	Report	Oermann (yellow card) 32' (yellow-red card) 78'; Koller (yellow card) 63'; Kayombo 71'	Stadium: CASHPOINT Arena; Attendance: 4,154; Referee: Julian Weinberger

=== UEFA Champions League ===
==== Play-off round ====
The draw for the play-off round was held on 4 August 2025.

20 August 2025 First leg	Bodø/Glimt (Norway)	5–0	(Austria) Sturm Graz	Aspmyra Stadion, Bodø
21:00	Høgh 7'; Bjørtuft 10'; Saltnes 25'; Evjen 54'; Bøving 79' (o.g.)	Report		Attendance: 7,896; Referee: Sandro Schärer (Switzerland)

26 August 2025 Second leg	Sturm Graz (Austria)	2–1 (2–6 agg.)	(Norway) Bodø/Glimt	Wörthersee Stadion, Klagenfurt (Note: Sturm Graz played their home matches at Wörthersee Stadion in Klagenfurt, instead of their regular stadium, Liebenauer Stadium in Graz, which did not meet UEFA requirements.)
21:00	Jatta 30'; Oermann 73'	Report	Jørgensen 15'	Attendance: 9,050; Referee: Szymon Marciniak (Poland)

=== UEFA Europa League ===
==== League phase ====
The draw for the league stage was held on 29 August 2025.

Pos	Team	Pld	W	D	L	GF	GA	GD	Pts	Qualification
24	(Norwegian Football Federation) Brann	8	2	3	3	9	11	−2	9	Advance to knockout phase play-offs (unseeded)
25	(Swiss Football Association) Young Boys	8	3	0	5	10	16	−6	9	
26	(Austrian Football Association) Sturm Graz	8	2	1	5	5	11	−6	7	
27	(Romanian Football Federation) FCSB	8	2	1	5	9	16	−7	7	
28	(Royal Dutch Football Association) Go Ahead Eagles	8	2	1	5	6	14	−8	7	

Source: UEFA
Rules for classification: League phase tiebreakers

Round	1	2	3	4	5	6	7	8
Ground	A	H	A	H	A	H	A	H
Result	L	W	L	D	L	L	L	W
Position	35	22	27	26	28	29		26
Points	0	3	3	4	4	4	4	7

Source: UEFA
A = Away; H = Home; W = Win; D = Draw; L = Loss

Win Draw Loss Fixtures

24 September 2025 1	Midtjylland (Denmark)	2–0	(Austria) Sturm Graz	MCH Arena, Herning
18:45	Christensen 7' (o.g.); Diao 88'	Report		Attendance: 8,331; Referee: Orel Grinfeld (Israel)

2 October 2025 2	Sturm Graz (Austria)	2–1	(Scotland) Rangers	Liebenauer Stadium, Graz
21:00	Horvat 7'; Kiteishvili 35'	Report	Gassama 49'	Attendance: 15,532; Referee: Halil Umut Meler (Turkey)

23 October 2025 3	Celtic (Scotland)	2–1	(Austria) Sturm Graz	Celtic Park, Glasgow
21:00 (20:00 UTC+1)		Report

6 November 2025 4	Sturm Graz (Austria)	0–0	(England) Nottingham Forest	Liebenauer Stadium, Graz
18:45		Report		Attendance: 16,192; Referee: Mykola Balakin (Ukraine)

27 November 2025 5	Panathinaikos (Greece)	2–1	(Austria) Sturm Graz	Olympic Stadium, Athens
21:00 (22:00 UTC+2)	Świderski 18'; Calabria 74'	Report	Kiteishvili 34'	Attendance: 21,013; Referee: Simone Sozza (Italy)

11 December 2025 6	Sturm Graz (Austria)	0–1	(Serbia) Red Star Belgrade	Liebenauer Stadium, Graz
18:45		Report	Ivanić 55'	Attendance: 16,077; Referee: Damian Sylwestrzak (Poland)

22 January 2026 7	Feyenoord (Netherlands)	3–0	(Austria) Sturm Graz	De Kuip, Rotterdam
18:45	Watanabe 5'; Hadj Moussa 68'; Borges 90'	Report

29 January 2026 8	Sturm Graz (Austria)	1–0	(Norway) Brann	Liebenauer Stadium, Graz
21:00	Kiteishvili 85'	Report

== Statistics ==
=== Goalscorers ===
Rank	Pos.	Player	Austrian Bundesliga	Austrian Cup	Champions League	Europa League	Total
1	MF	(Georgia (country)) Otar Kiteishvili	12	1	0	3	16
2	FW	(Norway) Seedy Jatta	3	1	1	0	5
3	FW	(Germany) Maurice Malone	3	1	0	0	4
3	MF	(Slovenia) Tomi Horvat	2	0	0	2	4
5	FW	(Austria) Leon Grgić	3	0	0	0	3
5	MF	(Poland) Filip Rózga	2	1	0	0	3
7	MF	(Austria) Jacob Hödl	2	0	0	0	2
7	MF	(Slovenia) Jon Gorenc Stanković	2	0	0	0	2
9	MF	(Cameroon) Ryan Fosso	1	0	0	0	1
9	DF	(Costa Rica) Jeyland Mitchell	1	0	0	0	1
9	DF	(Scotland) Max Johnston	1	0	0	0	1
9	FW	(Mali) Amady Camara	0	1	0	0	1
9	FW	(France) Axel Kayombo	0	1	0	0	1
9	DF	(Germany) Tim Oermann	0	0	1	0	1
Own goals			1	1	0	0	1
Totals			33	8	2	5	49

Last updated: 20 March 2026.
Source: FBref.com
