= 2025–26 Austrian Football Bundesliga =

113th season of top-tier football in Austria

Austrian Bundesliga
- Season: 2025–26
- Dates: 1 August 2025 – 17 May 2026
- Champions: LASK (2nd title)
- Relegated: Blau-Weiß Linz
- Champions League: LASK; Sturm Graz
- Europa League: Red Bull Salzburg
- Conference League: Austria Wien; Rapid Wien
- Matches: 132
- Goals: 348 (2.64 per match)
- Top goalscorer: Otar Kiteishvili (15 goals)
- Biggest home win: Salzburg 5–0 GAK (9 August 2025)
- Biggest away win: LASK 1–5 Salzburg (22 February 2026)
- Highest scoring: BWL 3–4 Sturm Graz (19 October 2025)
- Longest winning run: LASK (6)
- Longest unbeaten run: SK Sturm Graz (13)
- Longest winless run: GAK (11)
- Longest losing run: BWL (7)
- Highest attendance: 26,000; Rapid 1–3 Austria Wien (28 September 2025)
- Lowest attendance: 1,097; Hartberg 2–2 Wolfsberg (20 September 2025)
- Total attendance: 1,593,193
- Average attendance: 8,344

The 2025–26 Austrian Football Bundesliga, also known as Admiral Bundesliga for sponsorship reasons, was the 114th season of top-tier football in Austria. Sturm Graz were the two-time defending champion. The season began on 1 August 2025 and ended on 17 May 2026. This was the final season with the halving of points after the regular season, which was instituted for the 2018–19 season.

== Teams ==
Austria Klagenfurt were relegated to the 2025–26 Austrian Football Second League after finishing in last place in the 2024–25 Relegation Round, ending four-year run in the top flight. SV Ried was promoted as champions of the 2024–25 Austrian Football Second League, returning just two years after its relegation.

=== Stadia and locations ===
Location of teams in the 2025–26 Austrian Football Bundesliga

Team	Location	Venue	Capacity
Austria Wien	Vienna	Generali Arena	17,656
Blau-Weiß Linz	Linz	Hofmann Personal Stadion	5,595
Grazer AK	Graz	Merkur-Arena	16,364
LASK	Linz	Raiffeisen Arena	19,080
SK Rapid	Vienna	Allianz Stadion (Vienna)	28,600
Red Bull Salzburg	Wals-Siezenheim	Red Bull Arena	30,188
Rheindorf Altach	Altach	Stadion Schnabelholz	8,500
SV Ried	Ried im Innkreis	Keine Sorgen Arena	7,680
Sturm Graz	Graz	Merkur-Arena	16,364
TSV Hartberg	Hartberg	Profertil Arena Hartberg (Note: Hartberg played the first six home matches in the Datenpol Arena in Maria Enzersdorf because of renovations to their own stadium in Hartberg.)	5,024
Wolfsberger AC	Wolfsberg	Lavanttal-Arena	7,300
WSG Tirol	Innsbruck	Tivoli Stadion Tirol	16,008

=== Personnel and kits ===
Note: Flags indicate national team as has been defined under FIFA eligibility rules. Players may hold more than one non-FIFA nationality.

Team	Manager	Captain	Kit manufacturer	Shirt sponsors	
Team	Manager	Captain	Kit manufacturer	Main	Other(s)
Austria Wien	(Austria) Stephan Helm	(Austria) Manfred Fischer	Macron	Frankstahl (H)/Steelcoin (A)	List: Front: Wien Holding; Back: Wien Holding; Sleeves: MTEL Austria, Wien Holding; Shorts: Schuller Eh'klar, Wien Holding, Marsbet; Socks: Wien Holding; Alternate: Steelcoin
Blau-Weiß Linz	(Germany) Michael Köllner	(Austria) Fabio Strauss	Uhlsport	Linz AG	List: Front: Linz, Linz AG; Back: Linz Airport; Sleeves: Personal Hofmann, Oberösterreichische Nachrichten, Linz AG; Shorts: Gasteiner Mineral Water, Autohaus Leeb in Wels; Socks: Liwest; Alternate: None
Grazer AK	(Austria) Ferdinand Feldhofer	(Austria) Daniel Maderner	Macron	Mapei	List: Front: Energie Steiermark, Grawe, Köck KFZ-Technik Meisterbetrieb; Back: Salanettis, Grapos Headquarter; Sleeves: bm-romar, Ziesler GmbH; Shorts: tim Austria, Kleine Zeitung, Energie Steiermark; Socks: Energie Graz; Alternate: Energie Steiermark
LASK	(Austria) Dietmar Kühbauer	(Austria) Sascha Horvath	Adidas	Backaldrin Kornspitz	List: Front: BWT, Oberösterreich, BWT Change the world - Sip by sip; Back: Energie AG, Zipfer; Sleeves: Raiffeisenlandesbank Oberösterreich, Aspöck; Shorts: Franz Oberndorfer GmbH, HYPO Oberösterreich, BWT, Nerobet; Socks: Molto Luce; Alternate: HYPO Oberösterreich
Rapid Wien	(Denmark) Johannes Hoff Thorup	(Austria) Matthias Seidl	Puma	Wien Energie	List: Front: None; Back: spusu, Allianz; Sleeves: Raiffeisenlandesbank Oberösterreich; Shorts: Allianz, Wiener Zucker; Socks: easystaff; Alternate: foodaffairs
Red Bull Salzburg	(Austria) Daniel Beichler	(Denmark) Mads Bidstrup	Puma	Red Bull	List: Front: None; Back: Red Bull; Sleeves: Rauch; Shorts: None; Socks: None; Alternate: Rauch
Rheindorf Altach	(Serbia) Ognjen Zaric	(Austria) Lukas Jäger	Jako	Cashpoint	List: Front: Gunz Warenhandels; Back: Markus Stolz GmbH, Waibel Workwear; Sleeves: Pfanner; Shorts: Vorarlberger Kraftwerke, Grand Casino Liechtenstein; Socks: Vorarlberger Nachrichten; Alternate: Gebrüder Weiss
Ried	(Austria) Maximilian Senft	(Austria) Andreas Leitner	Hummel	Oberbank	List: Front: Back: Sleeves: Shorts: Socks: Alternate:
Sturm Graz	(Austria) Fabio Ingolitsch	(Austria) Stefan Hierländer	Nike	Puntigamer	List: Front: Grawe, Puntigamer; Back: Puntigamer, Grapos Headquarter; Sleeves: Steirisches Kürbiskernöl; Shorts: tim Austria (H)/Graz (A), Kleine Zeitung, Energie Steiermark; Socks: Sieme Weingüter; Alternate: Energie Steiermark
TSV Hartberg	(Austria) Manfred Schmid	(Austria) Jürgen Heil	Adidas	Eggerglas	List: Front: ADMIRAL Sportwetten, PROFERTIL Sperm Booster, Kühlanlagen Postl, PROMACULA, Faustmann Möbel, KAPO Fenster und Türen, 11teamsports, Alois Schweighofer GmbH, Steiermark, Hartberg; Back: Hochegger Dächer, MOLIN Industrie, KE KELIT; Sleeves: Objekttischlerei Gleichweit, Menopearl; Shorts: Boxxenstop, Energie Hartberg, MM Kanal-Rohr-Sanierung, Energie Steiermark; Socks: Kühlanlagen Postl; Alternate: None
Wolfsberger AC	(Austria) Thomas Silberberger	(Austria) Dominik Baumgartner	Adidas	RZ Ökostrom	List: Front: Robitsch Obst und Gemüse, Kärnten Sport, 11teamsports, Radio Kärnten, velox.at, Kelag; Back: Salanettis; Sleeves: Velox Bau-Systeme, ADMIRAL; Shorts: Eskimo Eiszeit Kärnten, HERWA Multiclean Gebäudereinigung, Beschriftung Grafik Druck, Gigasport, Kleine Zeitung; Socks: BMW Gönitzer; Alternate: SBH Rohstoffhandels
WSG Tirol	(Austria) Philipp Semlic	(Austria) Valentino Müller	Puma	CATL	List: Front: Tiroler Tageszeitung, Tiroler Versicherung, Herz für den Tiroler Fussball; Back: Tirol; Sleeves: Tiroler Tageszeitung, Tiroler Wasserkraft, 11teamsports; Shorts: Fröschl Bau; Socks: Volksbank Tirol, Union Investment; Alternate: Tiroler Versicherung

=== Managerial changes ===
Team	Outgoing manager	Manner of departure	Date of vacancy	Position in the table	Incoming manager	Date of appointment	Ref.
Blau-Weiß Linz	(Austria) Gerald Scheiblehner	Signed by Grasshopper	23 June 2025	Pre-season	(Slovenia) Mitja Mörec	5 July 2025	
SK Rapid Wien	(Austria) Stefan Kulovits (caretaker)	End of caretaker spell	30 June 2025	Pre-season	(Austria) Peter Stöger	1 July 2025	
LASK	(Austria) Maximilian Ritscher (caretaker)	End of caretaker spell	30 June 2025	Pre-season	(Portugal) João Sacramento	1 July 2025	
LASK	(Portugal) João Sacramento	Mutual consent	23 September 2025	10th	(Austria) Dietmar Kühbauer	9 October 2025	
Wolfsberger AC	(Austria) Dietmar Kühbauer	Signed by LASK	9 October 2025	4th	(Austria) Peter Pacult	13 October 2025	
Wolfsberger AC	(Austria) Peter Pacult	Sacked	12 November 2025	4th	(Germany) Ismail Atalan	12 November 2025	
Rapid Wien	(Austria) Peter Stöger	Sacked	28 November 2025	2nd	(Denmark) Johannes Hoff Thorup	30 December 2025	
Blau-Weiß Linz	(Slovenia) Mitja Mörec	Sacked	30 November 2025	12th	(Germany) Michael Köllner	21 December 2025	
Sturm Graz	(Austria) Jürgen Säumel	Sacked	22 December 2025	3rd	(Austria) Fabio Ingolitsch	29 December 2025	
Rheindorf Altach	(Austria) Fabio Ingolitsch	Signed by SK Sturm Graz	29 December 2025	9th	(Serbia) Ognjen Zaric	9 January 2026	
Red Bull Salzburg	(Germany) Thomas Letsch	Sacked	17 February 2026	1st	(Austria) Daniel Beichler	18 February 2026	
Wolfsberger AC	(Germany) Ismail Atalan	Sacked	7 April 2026	11th	(Austria) Thomas Silberberger	8 April 2026	

== Regular season ==
=== League table ===
Pos	Team	Pld	W	D	L	GF	GA	GD	Pts	Qualification
1	Sturm Graz	22	12	2	8	33	26	+7	38	Qualification for the Championship round
2	Red Bull Salzburg	22	10	7	5	42	26	+16	37	Qualification for the Championship round
3	LASK	22	11	4	7	32	30	+2	37	Qualification for the Championship round
4	Austria Wien	22	11	3	8	34	30	+4	36	Qualification for the Championship round
5	SK Rapid	22	9	6	7	26	25	+1	33	Qualification for the Championship round
6	TSV Hartberg	22	8	9	5	29	24	+5	33	Qualification for the Championship round
7	WSG Tirol	22	8	7	7	31	30	+1	31	Qualification for the Relegation round
8	SCR Altach	22	7	8	7	22	23	−1	29	Qualification for the Relegation round
9	SV Ried	22	8	4	10	26	30	−4	28	Qualification for the Relegation round
10	Wolfsberger	22	7	5	10	31	32	−1	26	Qualification for the Relegation round
11	Grazer AK	22	4	8	10	22	36	−14	20	Qualification for the Relegation round
12	Blau-Weiß Linz	22	4	3	15	20	36	−16	15	Qualification for the Relegation round

Source: Austrian Football Bundesliga
Rules for classification: 1) Points; 2) Head-to-head record; 3) Goal difference; 4) Goals scored; 5) Matches won; 6) Away matches won; 7) Away goals scored.

=== Results ===
Home \ Away	AWI	BWL	GAK	HAR	LSK	RWI	RBS	ALT	RIE	STU	TIR	WAC
Austria Wien	—	0–1	2–1	1–3	2–2	2–0	0–3	1–0	3–2	3–1	0–0	0–2
Blau-Weiß Linz	2–3	—	3–0	0–1	0–1	1–1	0–2	1–0	0–2	3–4	2–3	2–1
Grazer AK	2–2	3–1	—	0–0	1–2	1–1	1–1	3–1	2–1	0–3	1–1	1–3
Hartberg	2–1	1–1	1–0	—	2–2	0–1	1–2	0–0	2–0	0–1	2–1	2–2
LASK	2–1	2–0	1–0	3–3	—	3–0	1–5	1–0	1–3	0–2	1–0	3–1
SK Rapid	1–3	1–0	1–2	1–1	0–2	—	1–0	0–0	1–2	2–1	4–1	2–0
Red Bull Salzburg	0–2	2–2	5–0	0–0	3–0	2–1	—	2–2	4–1	0–2	2–3	2–1
SCR Altach	2–1	1–0	1–1	2–2	1–0	1–1	1–1	—	1–0	0–2	1–1	3–1
SV Ried	0–2	2–1	0–0	0–2	1–1	0–2	2–2	3–0	—	1–3	2–0	1–0
Sturm Graz	0–1	1–0	2–1	1–0	1–3	1–2	1–1	2–0	1–0	—	1–3	1–3
WSG Tirol	2–3	2–0	2–0	4–2	3–1	1–1	1–2	0–3	1–1	1–0	—	1–1
Wolfsberg	2–1	3–0	2–2	1–2	1–0	1–2	3–1	0–2	1–2	2–2	0–0	—

Source: Austrian Football Bundesliga
Legend: Blue = home team win; Yellow = draw; Red = away team win.

== Championship round ==
The points obtained during the regular season were halved (and rounded down) before the start of the playoff. As a result, the teams started with the following points before the playoff: Sturm Graz 19, Red Bull Salzburg 18, LASK 18, Austria Wien 18, Rapid Wien 16 and Hartberg 16. The points of Red Bull Salzburg, LASK, Rapid Wien and Hartberg were rounded down – in the event of any ties on points at the end of the playoffs, a half point would be added for them.

Pos	Team	Pld	W	D	L	GF	GA	GD	Pts	Qualification	LSK	STU	RBS	AWI	RWI	HAR
1	LASK (C)	32	17	7	8	56	42	+14	39	Qualification for the Champions League play-off round	—	1–1	2–1	4–1	3–1	0–0
2	Sturm Graz	32	16	8	8	51	35	+16	37	Qualification for the Champions League second qualifying round	1–1	—	1–1	1–1	2–0	0–0
3	Red Bull Salzburg	32	13	9	10	56	41	+15	29	Qualification for the Europa League third qualifying round (Note: The 2025–26 Austrian Cup winners (LASK) qualified for the Europa League third qualifying round. Since LASK finished as league champions, the Europa League berth went to the third place team.)	2–3	1–1	—	3–1	0–1	1–3
4	Austria Wien	32	14	5	13	45	50	−5	29	Qualification for the Conference League second qualifying round	0–3	2–5	1–3	—	1–1	1–0
5	SK Rapid (O)	32	12	8	12	36	41	−5	27	Qualification for the Conference League play-offs	4–2	0–2	1–0	0–2	—	0–2
6	Hartberg	32	10	12	10	40	40	0	25		1–5	2–4	1–2	0–1	2–2	—

Source: Austrian Football Bundesliga
Legend: Blue = home team win; Yellow = draw; Red = away team win.
Rules for classification: 1) Points; 2) Points with (possible) half points subtracted due to rounding; 3) Head-to-head points; 4) Head-to-head goal difference; 5) Head-to-head goals scored; 6) Goal difference; 7) Goals scored; 8) Matches won; 9) Away matches won; 10) Away goals scored.
(C) Champions; (O) Play-off winners

== Relegation round ==
The points obtained during the regular season were halved (and rounded down) before the start of the playoff. As a result, the teams started with the following points before the playoff: WSG Tirol 15, Rheindorf Altach 14, Ried 14, Wolfsberger AC 13, Grazer AK 10, and Blau-Weiß Linz 7. The points of WSG Tirol, Rheindorf Altach, and Blau-Weiß Linz were rounded down – in the event of any ties on points at the end of the playoffs, a half point would be added for those teams.

Pos	Team	Pld	W	D	L	GF	GA	GD	Pts	Qualification	RIE	WAC	ALT	GAK	TIR	BWL
1	Ried	32	12	6	14	38	42	−4	28	Qualification for the Conference League play-offs	—	0–1	3–2	2–0	2–1	2–0
2	Wolfsberger AC	32	11	8	13	41	42	−1	28	Qualification for the Conference League play-offs	0–0	—	1–1	1–0	2–0	0–0
3	Rheindorf Altach	32	10	12	10	36	39	−3	27		2–0	1–4	—	1–0	0–0	3–1
4	Grazer AK	32	9	10	13	42	45	−3	27		1–1	2–0	2–2	—	4–0	2–1
5	WSG Tirol	32	10	10	12	40	52	−12	24		1–0	3–1	2–2	1–5	—	1–1
6	Blau-Weiß Linz (R)	32	8	5	19	37	49	−12	21	Relegation to Austrian Football Second League	3–2	3–0	3–0	0–3	5–0	—

Source: Austrian Football Bundesliga
Legend: Blue = home team win; Yellow = draw; Red = away team win.
Rules for classification: 1) Points; 2) Points with (possible) half points subtracted due to rounding; 3) Head-to-head points; 4) Head-to-head goal difference; 5) Head-to-head goals scored; 6) Goal difference; 7) Goals scored; 8) Matches won; 9) Away matches won; 10) Away goals scored.
(R) Relegated

== Conference League play-offs ==
The winner and runner-up of the relegation round and the fifth-placed team from the championship round played to determine the qualifier to the Conference League second qualifying round.

Semi-final			Final
			7	Ried	2	0	2
7	Ried	2	5	Rapid Wien	1	3	4
8	Wolfsberger AC	1

=== Semi-final ===
19 May 2026	Ried	2–1	Wolfsberger AC	Ried
18:30 CEST (UTC+2)	Mutandwa 80', 90+3'	Report	Sulzner 87'	Stadium: BWT X Upper Austrian Arena; Attendance: 2,607; Referee: Markus Hameter

=== Final ===
22 May 2026	Ried	2–1	Rapid Wien	Ried
19:30 CEST (UTC+2)	Havenaar 14'; Boguo 77'	Report	Amane 75'	Stadium: BWT X Upper Austrian Arena; Attendance: 4,638; Referee: Walter Altmann

25 May 2026	Rapid Wien	3–0 (4–2 agg.)	Ried	Vienna
17:00 CEST (UTC+2)	Schöller 26', 66'; Schaub 90+2'	Report		Stadium: Allianz Stadion; Attendance: 14,604; Referee: Christian-Petru Ciochirca

== Statistics ==
=== Top scorers ===
Rank	Player	Club	Goals
1	(Georgia (country)) Otar Kiteishvili	Sturm Graz	15
2	(Zambia) Kingstone Mutandwa	SV Ried	14
3	(Austria) Elias Havel	Hartberg	13
3	(Nigeria) Moses Usor	LASK	13
5	(Austria) Patrick Greil	SCR Altach	12
6	(France) Ramiz Harakaté	Grazer AK	11
7	(United States) Samuel Adeniran	LASK	10
7	(Austria) Valentino Müller	WSG Tirol	10
9	(Bosnia and Herzegovina) Kerim Alajbegović	Red Bull Salzburg	9
9	(Denmark) Nikolai Baden	WSG Tirol	9
9	(Germany) Johannes Eggestein	Austria Wien	9
9	(Serbia) Petar Ratkov	Red Bull Salzburg	9
9	(Brazil) Ronivaldo	Blau-Weiß Linz	9
9	(Israel) Shon Weissman	Blau-Weiß Linz	9

== Awards ==
=== Annual awards ===
Award	Winner	Club
Player of the Season	(Georgia (country)) Otar Kiteishvili	Sturm Graz
Goalkeeper of the Season	(Germany) Tom Ritzy Hülsmann	Hartberg
Newcomer of the Season	(Bosnia and Herzegovina) Kerim Alajbegović	Red Bull Salzburg
Coach of the Season	(Austria) Dietmar Kühbauer	LASK

=== Team of the Year ===

Team of the Year
Goalkeeper	(Germany) Tom Ritzy Hülsmann (Hartberg)				
Defence	(Panama) Andrés Andrade (LASK)		Aleksandar Dragović (Austria Wien)		(Senegal) Modou Kéba Cissé (LASK)
Midfield	(Bosnia and Herzegovina) Kerim Alajbegović (Red Bull Salzburg)	(Georgia (country)) Otar Kiteishvili (Sturm Graz)	(Austria) Sascha Horvath (LASK)	(Austria) Patrick Greil (Altach)	(Denmark) Kasper Jørgensen (LASK)
Attack	(Austria) Saša Kalajdžić (LASK)		(Nigeria) Moses Usor (LASK)		

== Attendances ==
Austrian Football Bundesliga clubs listed by average home league attendance:

Pos	Club	Average attendance
1	SK Rapid	19,210
2	Sturm Graz	15,848
3	Austria Wien	13,659
4	LASK	13,401
5	RB Salzburg	10,789
6	Grazer AK	8,153
7	BW Linz	5,253
8	SV Ried	5,049
9	Rheindorf Altach	4,970
10	Wolfsberger AC	4,187
11	TSV Hartberg	3,327
12	WSG Tirol	1,975

== See also ==
- 2025–26 Austrian Football Second League
- 2025–26 Austrian Cup
