= Filip Rózga =

Polish footballer (born 2006

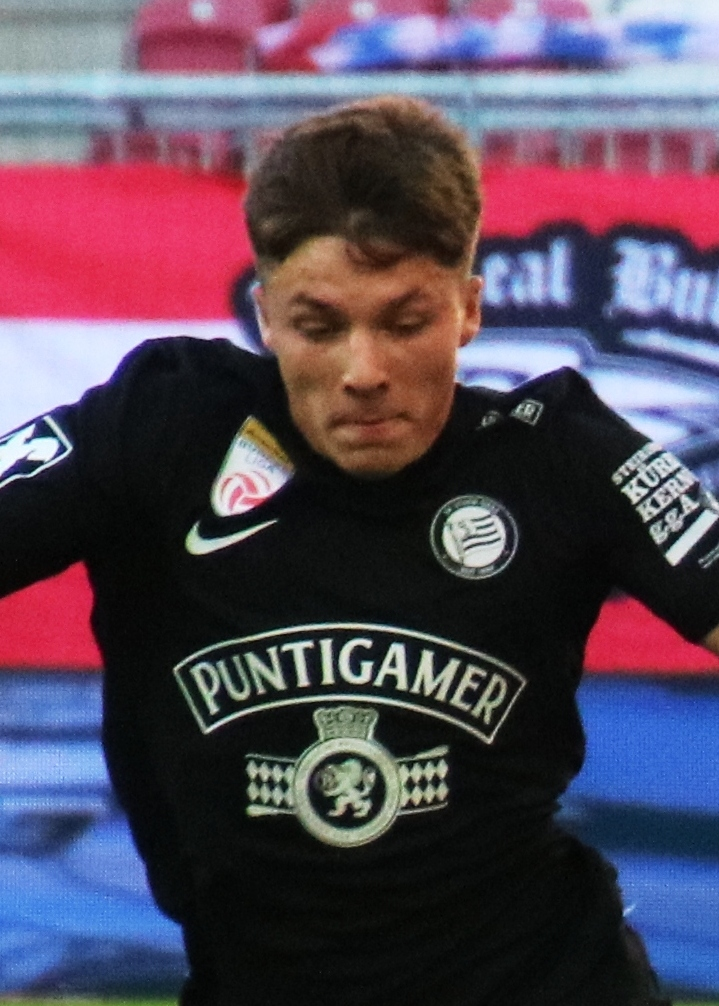
- Rózga playing for Sturm Graz in 2025

Personal information
- Full name: Filip Jan Rózga
- Date of birth: 7 August 2006 (age 20)
- Place of birth: Skawina, Poland
- Height: 1.77 m (5 ft 10 in)
- Position: Midfielder

Team information
- Current team: Sturm Graz
- Number: 8

Youth career
- –2024: Cracovia

Senior career*
Years	Team	Apps	(Gls)
2023–2025	Cracovia	42	(2)
2025–	Sturm Graz	22	(2)

International career^{‡}
2022–2023	Poland U17	10	(1)
2023	Poland U18	5	(2)
2024–2025	Poland U19	4	(0)
2025	Poland U21	2	(0)
2025–	Poland	4	(0)
- * Club domestic league appearances and goals as of 20:32, 20 September 2026 (UTC) ‡ National team caps and goals as of 18:09, 31 May 2026 (UTC)

Filip Jan Rózga (born 7 August 2006) is a Polish professional footballer who plays as a midfielder for Austrian Bundesliga club Sturm Graz and the Poland national team.

== Club career ==
As a youth player, Rózga joined the youth academy of Polish side Cracovia, and was promoted to the club's senior team in 2023, where he made forty-two league appearances and scored two goals. On 27 May 2023, Rózga made his league debut in a 3–0 home win over Wisła Płock. On 24 August 2024, he scored his first goal for Cracovia during a 3–2 home win over Górnik Zabrze in the league.

Ahead of the 2025–26 season, Rózga signed a four-year contract with Austrian side Sturm Graz. Austrian newspaper Kronen Zeitung wrote in 2025 that he "long since made a name for himself as a great talent in Poland" upon signing for the club.

== International career ==
Rózga is a Poland youth international. In October 2024 and March 2025, he played for the Poland under-19 team in the 2025 UEFA European Under-19 Championship qualification campaign.

Rózga received his first call-up for the Poland senior team in November 2025 ahead of their 2026 FIFA World Cup qualifying matches against the Netherlands and Malta. He made his debut on 14 November as a late substitute in a 1–1 draw against the Netherlands.

== Career statistics ==
=== Club ===
As of match played 20 September 2026

Appearances and goals by club, season and competition
Club	Season	League			National cup (Note: Includes Polish Cup, Austrian Cup)		Europe		Other		Total	
Club	Season	Division	Apps	Goals	Apps	Goals	Apps	Goals	Apps	Goals	Apps	Goals
Cracovia	2022–23	Ekstraklasa	1	0	0	0	—		—		1	0
Cracovia	2023–24	Ekstraklasa	12	0	1	0	—		—		13	0
Cracovia	2024–25	Ekstraklasa	29	2	1	0	—		—		30	2
Cracovia	Total		42	2	2	0	—		—		44	2
Sturm Graz	2025–26	Austrian Bundesliga	20	2	4	1	7 (Note: One appearance in UEFA Champions League, six appearances in UEFA Europa League)	0	—		31	3
Sturm Graz	2026–27	Austrian Bundesliga	2	0	0	0	1 (Note: Appearances in UEFA Europa League)	0	—		3	0
Sturm Graz	Total		22	2	4	1	8	0	—		34	3
Career total			64	4	6	1	8	0	0	0	78	5

=== International ===
As of match played 31 May 2026

Appearances and goals by national team and year
National team	Year	Apps	Goals
Poland
Poland	2025	2	0
Poland	2026	2	0
Total		4	0
