= Julius Beck (footballer, born 2005) =

Danish footballer (born 2005)

Personal information
- Full name: Julius Eskelund Beck
- Date of birth: 27 April 2005 (age 21)
- Place of birth: Haderslev, Denmark
- Height: 1.78 m (5 ft 10 in)
- Position: Midfielder

Team information
- Current team: Elfsborg (on loan from Sturm Graz)
- Number: 19

Youth career
- SønderjyskE
- 2021–2023: Spezia
- 2023–2024: → AGF (loan)

Senior career*
Years	Team	Apps	(Gls)
2021	SønderjyskE	3	(0)
2022–2025	Spezia	1	(0)
2023–2024	→ AGF (loan)	7	(0)
2024–2025	→ Esbjerg fB (loan)	19	(3)
2025	Esbjerg fB	0	(0)
2025–	Sturm Graz II	4	(2)
2025–	Sturm Graz	3	(0)
2026–	→ Elfsborg (loan)	8	(0)

International career^{‡}
2020–2021	Denmark U16	4	(0)
2021–2022	Denmark U17	12	(1)
2022–2023	Denmark U18	8	(0)
2023	Denmark U19	7	(0)
2025–	Denmark U20	4	(1)
- * Club domestic league appearances and goals as of 8 July 2026 ‡ National team caps and goals as of 18:13, 5 July 2025 (UTC)

Julius Eskelund Beck (born 27 April 2005) is a Danish professional footballer who plays as a midfielder for Allsvenskan club IF Elfsborg, on loan from Austrian Bundesliga club Sturm Graz.

== Career ==
=== SønderjyskE ===
Beck is a product of SønderjyskE, where he spent his whole youth career. He played his way through the youth section. In January 2021, 15-year old Beck played in a friendly game for SønderjyskE's first team against AC Horsens, where he also scored.

On 9 May 2021, 16-year old Beck got his official debut for SønderjyskE in the Danish Superliga against Vejle Boldklub, where he became the supremely youngest player who has ever represented SønderjyskE in the Danish Superliga as well as the third youngest Danish Superliga debutant ever. Beck started on the bench, but came on the pitch after the half time. Beck made a total of three league appearances in the 2020/21 season.

=== Spezia ===
On 31 August 2021, SønderjyskE sold Julis Beck to Italian club Spezia, a club that had the same owners as SønderjyskE. On 28 August 2022, 17-year old Beck was called up to his first Serie A game for Spezia. He remained on the bench for the whole game. He got his Serie A-debut on 2 October 2022 in a 0–4 defeat against Lazio.

==== Loan to AGF ====
On 1 September 2023, he joined AGF on loan for the rest of the season. The deal also included a purchase option. After his loan spell, which saw him play just under 200 minutes of first team time in 8 matches, Beck returned to Spezia.

=== Esbjerg fB ===
On 2 September 2024 newly promoted Danish 1st Division club Esbjerg fB confirmed that Beck joined the club on a rental agreement until the end of the 2024–25 season, with an option to buy included.

On February 2, 2025, it was confirmed that Esbjerg had bought Beck free in Spezia on a deal until June 2027. This meant that after the loan deal ended at the conclusion of the season, he would make a permanent move to Esbjerg.

=== Sturm Graz ===
On 30 May 2025 it was confirmed, that Beck had joined Austrian Football Bundesliga club Sturm Graz on a deal until June 2029.

On 5 February 2026, Beck joined Allsvenskan club IF Elfsborg, on a one-year loan deal, ahead of the 2026 season.

== Personal life ==
Julius Beck is the son of former Danish footballer, Henrik Beck, born in 1974.

== Career statistics ==
As of match played 5 October 2025

Club	Season	League			National cup (Note: Includes Danish Cup, Coppa Italia, Austrian Cup)		Europe		Total	
Club	Season	Division	Apps	Goals	Apps	Goals	Apps	Goals	Apps	Goals
SønderjyskE	2020–21	Danish Superliga	3	0	0	0	—		3	0
Spezia	2022–23	Serie A	1	0	1	0	—		2	0
AGF (loan)	2023–24	Danish Superliga	7	0	1	0	—		8	0
Esbjerg fB (loan)	2024–25	Danish 1st Division	19	2	3	0	—		22	2
Sturm Graz	2025–26	Austrian Bundesliga	3	0	1	0	2 (Note: One appearance in UEFA Champions League, one appearance in UEFA Europa League)	0	6	0
Career total			33	0	6	0	2	0	41	2
