= Joachim Standfest =

Austrian football manager (born 1980)

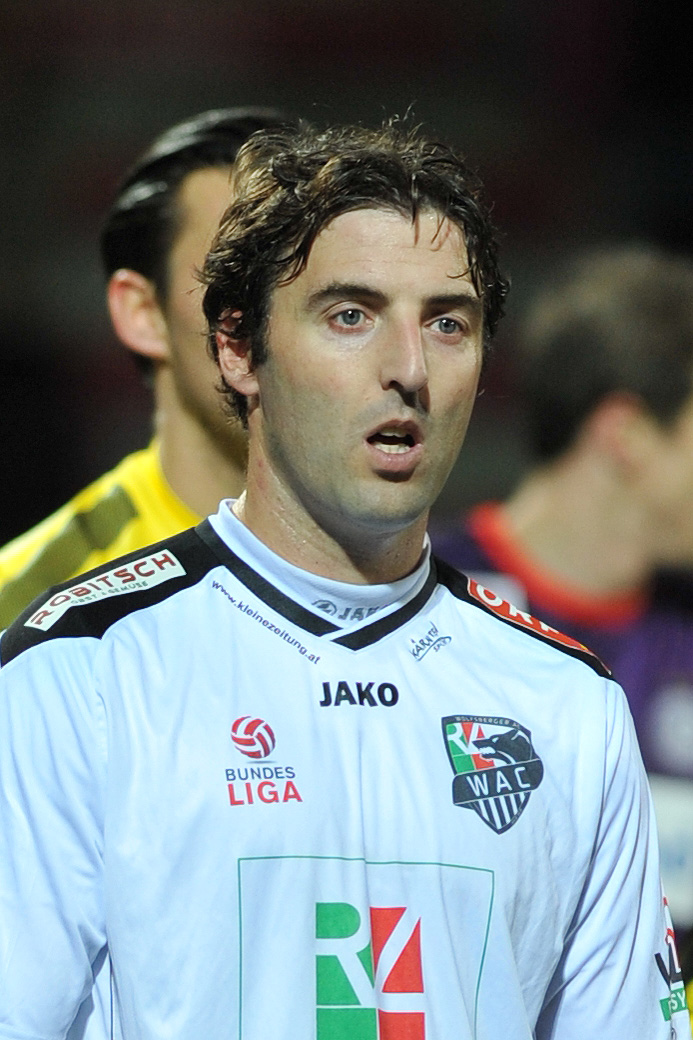
- Standfest in 2013

Personal information
- Date of birth: 30 May 1980 (age 46)
- Place of birth: Leoben, Austria
- Height: 1.80 m (5 ft 11 in)
- Positions: Right back; midfielder

Team information
- Current team: Grazer AK (caretaker manager)

Youth career
- –1996: SV Radmer
- 1996–1997: WSV Eisenerz

Senior career*
Years	Team	Apps	(Gls)
1997–1998	SV Rottenmann		
1998–2006	Grazer AK	216	(13)
2007–2010	Austria Wien	107	(9)
2010–2012	Sturm Graz	59	(1)
2012–2013	Kapfenberger SV	34	(3)
2013–2017	Wolfsberger AC	126	(6)

International career
1998–2001	Austria U-21	7	(0)
2003–2008	Austria	34	(2)

Managerial career
- 2017: Sturm Graz II
- 2018–2019: Sturm Graz (assistant)
- 2019–2020: Admira Wacker (assistant)
- 2020–2021: Amstetten
- 2022–2023: Austria Wien (U18)
- 2023: Rheindorf Altach (assistant)
- 2023–2024: Rheindorf Altach
- 2026–: Grazer AK (assistant)
- 2026–: Grazer AK (caretaker)
- * Club domestic league appearances and goals

Joachim Standfest (born 30 May 1980) is an Austrian football coach and former professional player who is the caretaker manager of Austrian Bundesliga club Grazer AK . During his playing career he was a midfielder or right-back.

== Club career ==
Born in Leoben, Styria, Standfest made his professional debut for Grazer AK in the 1998–1999 season. He stayed nine seasons with GAK, winning a league title and three domestic cups. He left GAK for giants Austria Wien in January 2007, just before GAK were demoted to the Regionalliga Mitte because of financial difficulties.

In 2001 Standfest underwent bowel surgery and a tumor was taken away.

In 2010, he transferred from vice-champions Austria Wien to cup-winners Sturm Graz, citing family reasons for the move. In 2012, he left Sturm Graz to join Kapfenberger SV.

Standfest retired from playing in May 2015.

== International career ==
Standfest made his debut for Austria in October 2003 against the Czech Republic and was a participant at EURO 2008. He earned 34 caps, scoring 2 goals.

== Managerial career ==
On 7 August 2020, Standfest was hired by Austrian Football Second League club Amstetten.

On 1 February 2022, he signed with Austria Wien as the head coach of the club's under-18 squad.

Standfest joined Austrian Bundesliga club Rheindorf Altach as assistant coach on 21 March 2023. On 1 July 2023, Standfest was announced as their new head coach, following the departure of Klaus Schmidt. He was dismissed on 30 September 2023, with Altach in second-to-last in the Bundesliga standings.

On 17 August 2026, Standfest was appointed caretaker manager of Grazer AK following the dismissal of Ferdinand Feldhofer.

== Career statistics ==
Appearances and goals by national team and year
National team	Year	Apps	Goals
Austria	2003	1	0
Austria	2004	5	0
Austria	2005	3	1
Austria	2006	7	0
Austria	2007	11	1
Austria	2008	7	0
Total		34	2

== Honours ==
- Austrian Bundesliga: 2004
- Austrian Cup: 2000, 2002, 2004, 2007, 2009
