= Jeyland Mitchell =

Costa Rican footballer (born 2004)

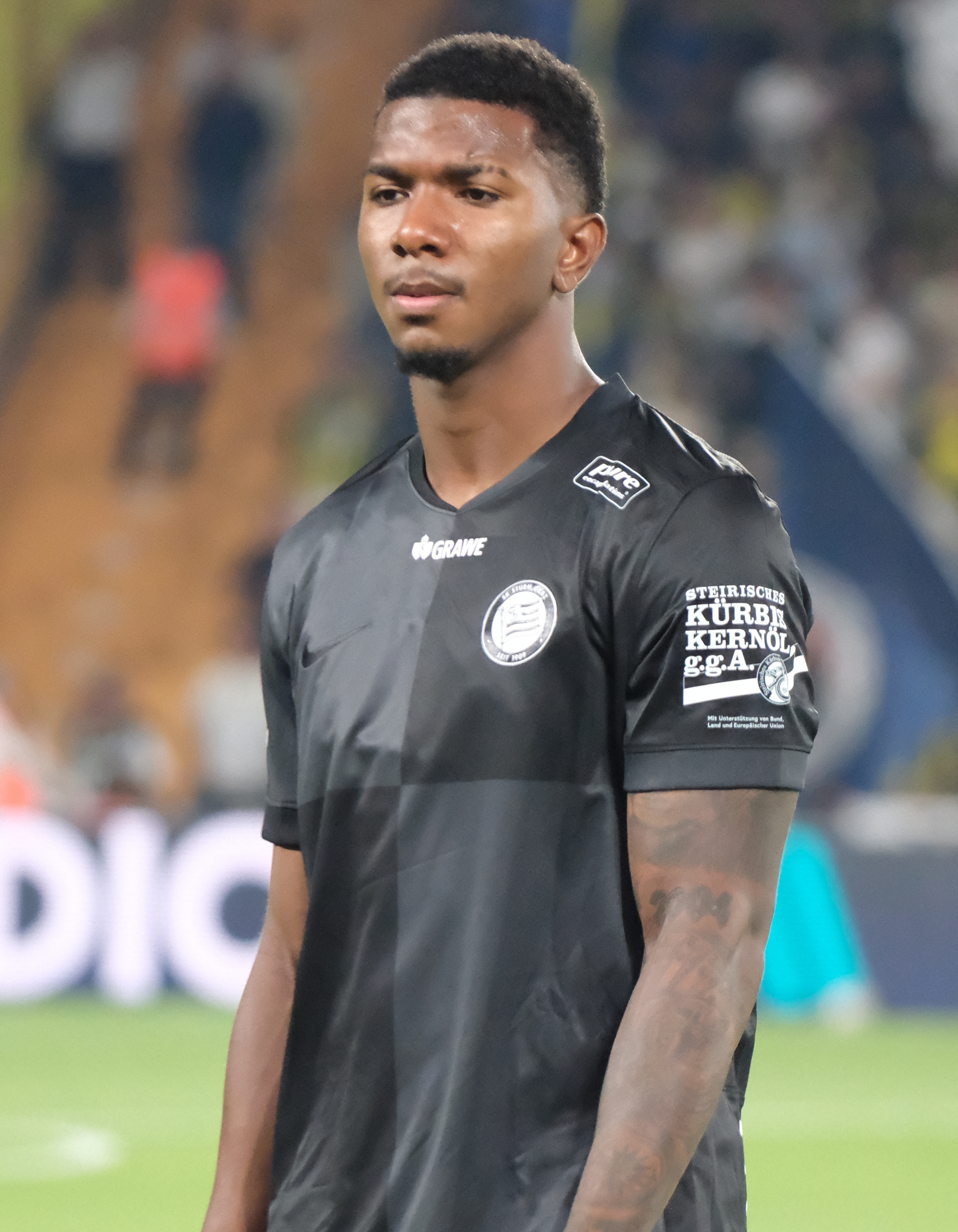
- Mitchell in 2026

Personal information
- Full name: Jeyland Yahir Mitchell Baltodano
- Date of birth: 29 September 2004 (age 22)
- Place of birth: Limón, Costa Rica
- Height: 1.87 m (6 ft 2 in)
- Position: Defender

Team information
- Current team: Strasbourg
- Number: 4

Youth career
- –2020: Limón
- 2020: Deportivo Saprissa

Senior career*
Years	Team	Apps	(Gls)
2021	Limón	0	(0)
2021–2023	Guanacasteca	25	(1)
2023	Municipal Liberia	9	(1)
2024	Alajuelense	12	(0)
2024–2026	Feyenoord	4	(0)
2025–2026	→ Sturm Graz (loan)	19	(1)
2026	Sturm Graz	2	(0)
2026–	Strasbourg	6	(0)

International career^{‡}
2024–	Costa Rica	29	(2)
- * Club domestic league appearances and goals as of 19:14, 17 October 2026 (UTC) ‡ National team caps and goals as of 21:26, 4 October 2026 (UTC)

Jeyland Yahir Mitchell Baltodano (born 29 September 2004) is a Costa Rican professional footballer who plays as a defender for Ligue 1 club Strasbourg, and the Costa Rica national team.

== Early and personal life ==
Mitchell was born in Limón. His grandfather Harold was a footballer for both Limonense and Cartaginés, and he is the cousin of fellow footballer Josué Mitchell. Whilst his mother is a Deportivo Saprissa supporter, Mitchell is a Alajuelense fan.

== Club career ==
=== Limón ===
Having started training as a footballer at age 3, he joined Limón's academy aged 8. He joined the academy of Deportivo Saprissa in 2020 but left and returned to Limón after the start of the COVID-19 pandemic. He re-signed for Limón in 2021, joining the club's first team but manager Luis Fernando Fallas was sacked shortly after and he never made a first-team appearance for the club.

=== Guanacasteca ===
After a spell out of football playing basketball, Mitchell followed former manager Fallas to Guanacasteca for the 2021–22 Apertura. He made his Liga FPD debut on 13 October 2021 in a 3–1 defeat to Municipal Grecia. In March 2022, Mitchell suffered a muscle tear that ruled him out for the rest of the season, having made 12 league appearances over the course of the season. Mitchell played 13 times during the 2022–23 season.

=== Municipal Liberia ===
On 28 June 2023, it was announced that Mitchell had signed for Municipal Liberia. He made 9 appearances, scoring once, during the 2023–24 Apertura.

=== Alajuelense ===
In December 2023, it was announced that Mitchell had signed for Alajuelense on a one-year contract. Mitchell made his debut for Alajuelense in a 4–0 win away to Municipal Liberia on 27 March 2024, due to an injury to Alexis Gamboa. After 12 appearances for Alajuelense, he extended his contract until June 2027 at the end of the season.

=== Feyenoord ===
On 8 July 2024, Mitchell signed for Eredivisie club Feyenoord on a five-year contract.

=== Sturm Graz ===
On 1 September 2025, Mitchell moved on loan to Austrian Bundesliga club Sturm Graz on a season-long loan with an option to buy. Later that year, on 7 December, he scored his first goal for the club in a 2–1 win over Grazer AK.

=== Strasbourg ===
On 19 August 2026, Mitchell signed a five-year contract with Ligue 1 side Strasbourg.

== International career ==
On 28 January 2024, it was announced that Mitchell had received his first call-up to the Costa Rica national team for a friendly against El Salvador on 2 February, with Mitchell making his international debut in this match after coming on as a substitute.

Mitchell was named in Costa Rica's squad for the 2024 Copa América.

== Career statistics ==
=== Club ===
As of match played 17 October 2026

Appearances and goals by club, season and competition
Club	Season	League			National cup (Note: Includes KNVB Cup, Austrian Cup)		Continental		Other		Total	
Club	Season	Division	Apps	Goals	Apps	Goals	Apps	Goals	Apps	Goals	Apps	Goals
Limón	2020–21	Liga FPD	0	0	—		—		—		0	0
Guanacasteca	2021–22	Liga FPD	12	1	—		—		—		12	1
Guanacasteca	2022–23	Liga FPD	13	0	—		—		—		13	0
Guanacasteca	Total		25	1	—		—		—		25	1
Municipal Liberia	2023–24	Liga FPD	9	1	—		—		—		9	1
Alajuelense	2023–24	Liga FPD	12	0	—		—		—		12	0
Feyenoord	2024–25	Eredivisie	1	0	1	0	7 (Note: Appearances in UEFA Champions League)	0	0	0	9	0
Sturm Graz (loan)	2025–26	Austrian Bundesliga	19	1	0	0	7 (Note: Appearances in UEFA Europa League)	0	—		26	1
Sturm Graz	2026–27	Austrian Bundesliga	2	0	0	0	4 (Note: Four appearances in UEFA Champions League)	1	—		6	1
Strasbourg	2026–27	Ligue 1	6	0	0	0	—		—		6	0
Career total			74	3	1	0	18	1	0	0	93	4

=== International ===
As of match played 4 October 2026

Appearances and goals by national team and year
National team	Year	Apps	Goals
Costa Rica	2024	13	0
Costa Rica	2025	8	2
Costa Rica	2026	8	0
Total		29	2

Scores and results list Costa Rica's goal tally first.

List of international goals scored by Jeyland Mitchell
No.	Date	Venue	Opponent	Score	Result	Competition
1	21 March 2025	FFB Stadium, Belmopan, Belize	Belize	4–0	7–0	2025 CONCACAF Gold Cup qualification
2	10 June 2025	Estadio Nacional, San José, Costa Rica	Trinidad and Tobago	1–0	2–1	2026 FIFA World Cup qualification
