= Axel Kayombo =

Congolese footballer (born 2006)

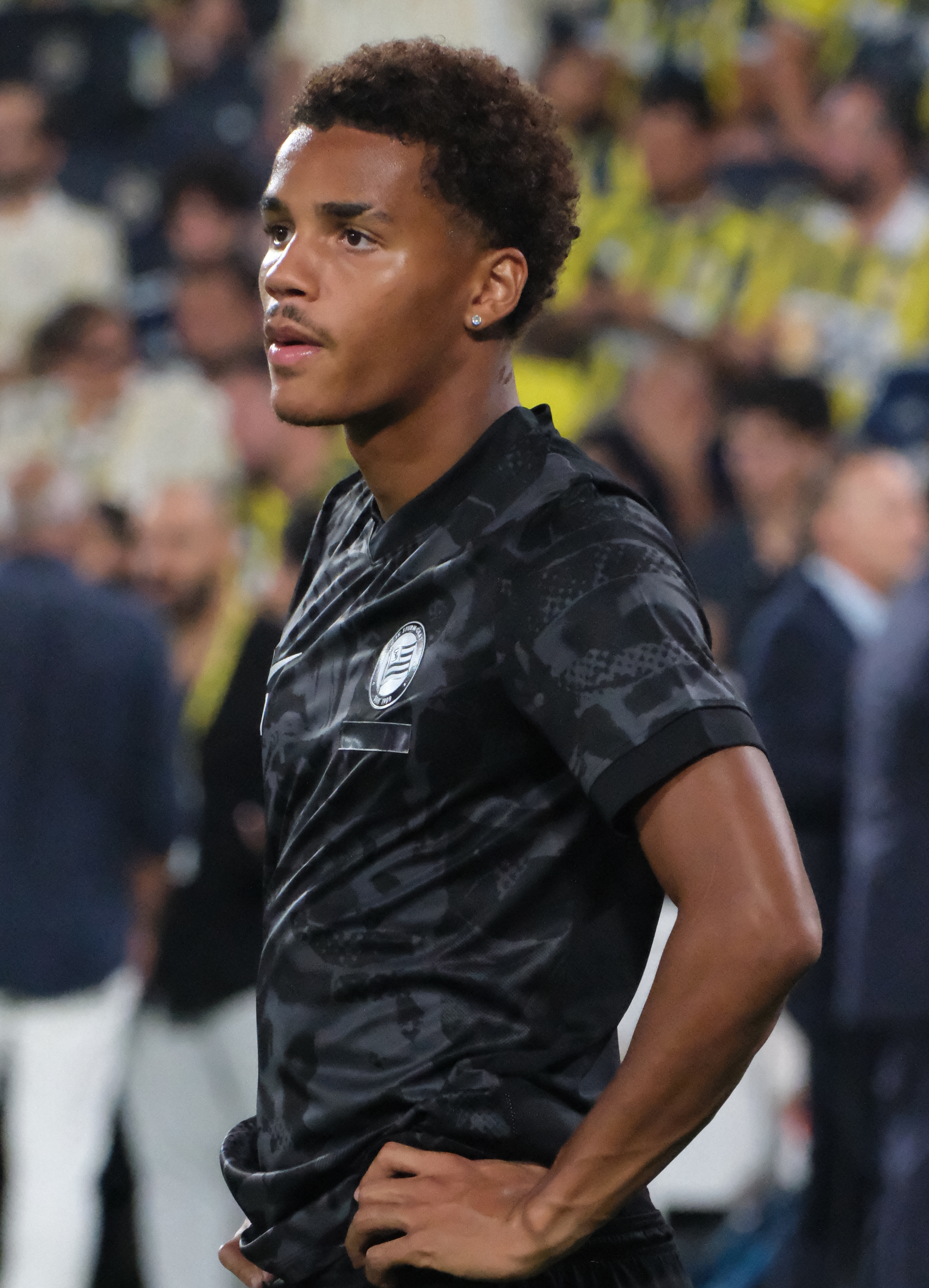

Personal information
- Full name: Axel Flory Pierre Kayombo
- Date of birth: 25 February 2006 (age 20)
- Place of birth: Écully, France
- Height: 1.86 m (6 ft 1 in)
- Position: Winger

Team information
- Current team: Sturm Graz
- Number: 11

Youth career
- Servette

Senior career*
Years	Team	Apps	(Gls)
2022–2024	Basel II	42	(16)
2024–2025	Basel	2	(0)
2024–2025	→ Stade Lausanne Ouchy (loan)	28	(9)
2025–	Sturm Graz	21	(1)

International career^{‡}
2024–2025	DR Congo U20	4	(0)
- * Club domestic league appearances and goals as of 19:26, 10 October 2026 (UTC) ‡ National team caps and goals as of 15:26, 7 July 2025 (UTC)

Axel Flory Pierre Kayombo (born 25 February 2006) is a professional footballer who plays as a winger for Austrian Bundesliga club Sturm Graz. Born in France, he is a youth international for the DR Congo.

== Career ==
A youth product of Servette, Kayombo moved to Basel in 2015 where he finished his development. On 21 July 2023, he was promoted to Basel's senior side. He made his senior and professional debut with Basel in a 2–0 Swiss Super League loss to FC Lugano on 2 April 2024. On 31 July 2024, he extended his contract with Basel until 2026, and joined Stade Lausanne-Ouchy on a season-long loan in the Swiss Challenge League. On 28 May 2025, he joined Sturm Graz in the Austrian Football Bundesliga on a contract until 2029.

On 28 May 2025, Kayombo signed a long-term contract with Austrian Bundesliga champions Sturm Graz.

== International career ==
Born in France, Kayombo is of DR Congolese descent through his father and holds dual French-Congolese citizenship. In November 2024, he was called up to the DR Congo U20s for a training camp. He was not released by his club to the DR Congo U20s for the 2025 U-20 Africa Cup of Nations.

== Career statistics ==
As of match played 15 October 2026

Appearances and goals by club, season and competition
Club	Season	League			Cup		Europe		Total	
Club	Season	Division	Apps	Goals	Apps	Goals	Apps	Goals	Apps	Goals
Basel U21	2021–22	Swiss Promotion League	2	0	—		—		2	0
Basel U21	2022–23	Swiss Promotion League	10	2	—		—		10	2
Basel U21	2023–24	Swiss Promotion League	30	14	—		—		30	14
Basel U21	Total		42	16	—		—		42	16
Basel	2023–24	Swiss Super League	2	0	0	0	0	0	2	0
Stade Lausanne Ouchy (loan)	2024–25	Swiss Super League	28	9	2	1	—		30	10
Sturm Graz	2025–26	Austrian Bundesliga	16	1	2	1	6 (Note: Appearances in UEFA Europa League)	0	24	2
Sturm Graz	2026–27	Austrian Bundesliga	5	0	1	0	4 (Note: Three appearances in UEFA Champions League, one appearance in UEFA Europa League)	0	10	0
Sturm Graz	Total		21	1	3	1	10	0	34	2
Career total			92	26	5	2	10	0	107	28
