= Fabio Ingolitsch =

Austrian football manager (born 1992)

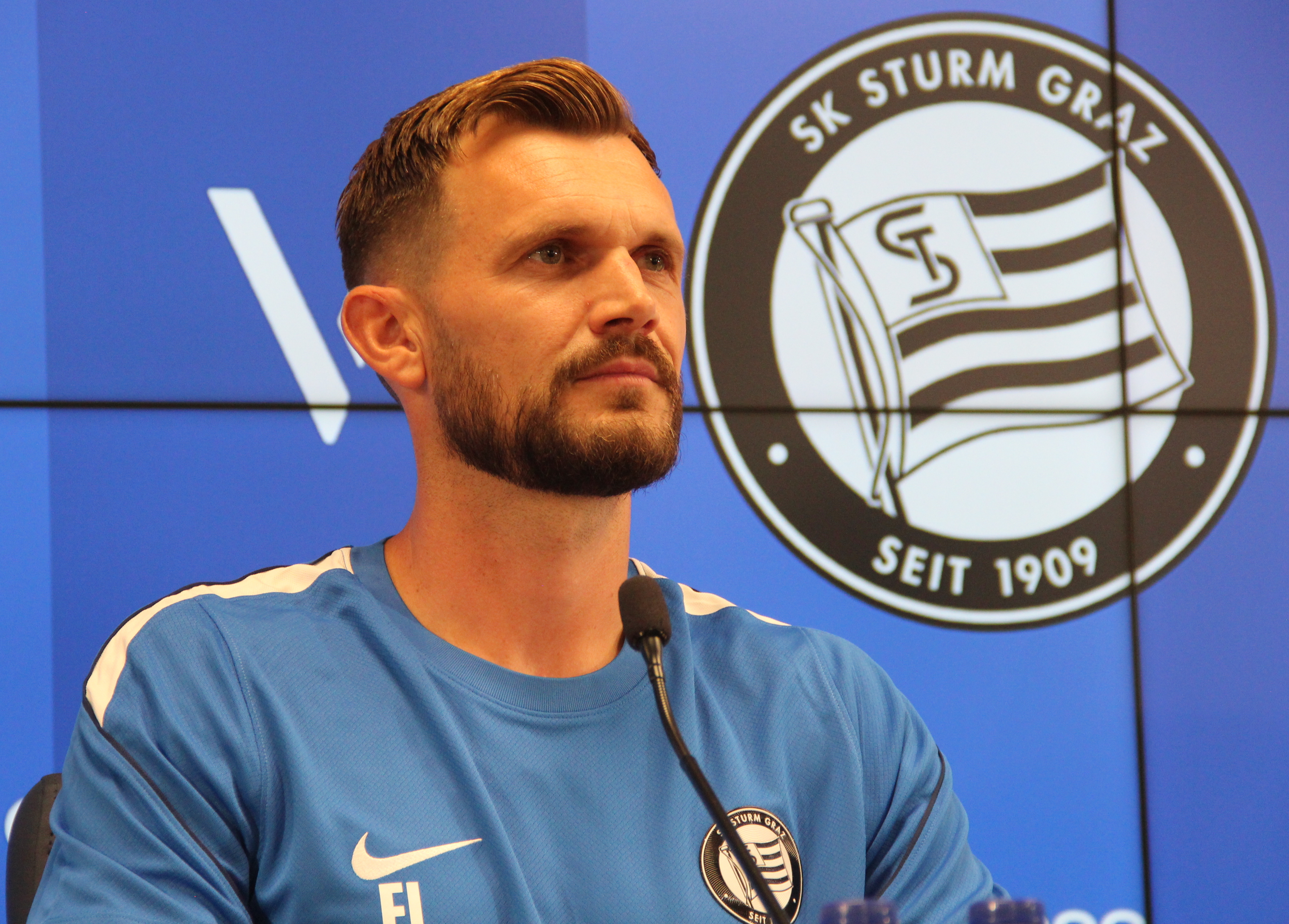
- Ingolitsch in 2026

Personal information
- Date of birth: 10 April 1992 (age 34)
- Place of birth: Salzburg, Austria
- Position: Midfielder

Team information
- Current team: Sturm Graz (head coach)

Youth career
- 1998–2007: SK Bischofshofen

Senior career*
Years	Team	Apps	(Gls)
2007	SK Bischofshofen II	3	(1)
2007–2010	SK Bischofshofen	54	(6)
2010	TSV St. Johann	8	(0)
2010	TSV St. Johann II	4	(1)
2011–2012	SK Bischofshofen	32	(8)
2012–2014	SC Golling	30	(13)
2014	SK Bischofshofen	14	(5)
2015–2016	SC Golling	30	(13)
2016	SK Bischofshofen	15	(4)
2017	SV Schwarzach im Pongau	11	(1)
2017	SV Kuchl	7	(2)
Total		197	(56)

Managerial career
- 2022–2023: FC Liefering
- 2024: FC Zürich U21
- 2024–2025: Rheindorf Altach
- 2026–: Sturm Graz
- * Club domestic league appearances and goals

Fabio Ingolitsch (born 10 April 1992) is an Austrian football manager and former player who is the head coach of Austrian Bundesliga club Sturm Graz.

== Playing career ==
Ingolitsch played for various lower-division clubs in Salzburg before ending his playing career at the age of 25.

== Managerial career ==
=== Early years ===
From 2012 to 2014 he trained youth teams of his local club SK Bischofshofen. In April 2016 he got the UEFA A-license at the age of 24 .With the beginning of the 2017–18 season he became assistance coach to Janusz Góra und Gerhard Struber for FC Liefering. He also was assistance coach under Bo Svensson. In January 2021 Matthias Jaissle became head coach of Liefering and Ingolitsch head coach of the U18 team. In October 2021 he got the UEFA-Pro-license. At the age of 29 he was the youngest Austrian who did so.

=== FC Liefering ===
At the start of the 2022–23 season, Ingolitsch returned to FC Liefering as head coach. The season proved challenging, with Liefering finishing ninth and only securing their league status on the penultimate matchday. Following the conclusion of the campaign, the club and Ingolitsch mutually agreed to end their collaboration.

=== FC Zürich U21 and Rheindorf Altach ===
On 27 May 2024, Ingolitsch was appointed head coach of the under-21 team of Swiss club FC Zürich, competing in the third-tier Promotion League. His tenure in Switzerland was short-lived, however, as he returned to Austria later that year.

On 9 October 2024, Ingolitsch was named head coach of Rheindorf Altach, replacing Joachim Standfest at a time when the club was second from bottom in the Austrian Bundesliga table. At Altach, he worked alongside his brother Sandro Ingolitsch, who was part of the club's playing squad.

Despite taking charge of a struggling side, Ingolitsch guided Altach to a second-to-last-place finish, which was sufficient to secure the club's Bundesliga status. In the 2025–26 season, the team reached the winter break in ninth position and recorded the strongest defensive record in the league.

=== Sturm Graz ===
During the winter break of the 2025–26 season, Ingolitsch moved to league rivals Sturm Graz, where he succeeded Jürgen Säumel as head coach.

== Personal life ==
Ingolitsch is a teacher. He is the older brother of Sandro who plays for Rheindorf Altach in the Austrian Bundesliga.

== Managerial statistics ==
As of match played 22 November 2026

Managerial record by team and tenure
Team	From	To	Record					Ref.
Team	From	To	P	W	D	L	Win %	Ref.
FC Liefering	1 July 2022	30 June 2023	30	11	4	15	36.67	
FC Zürich U21	1 July 2024	8 October 2024	11	4	1	6	36.36	
Rheindorf Altach	9 October 2024	31 December 2025	42	11	15	16	26.19	
Sturm Graz	1 January 2026	Present	41	17	12	12	41.46	
Total			124	43	32	49	34.68	
