= Klaus Schmidt (footballer) =

Austrian football manager

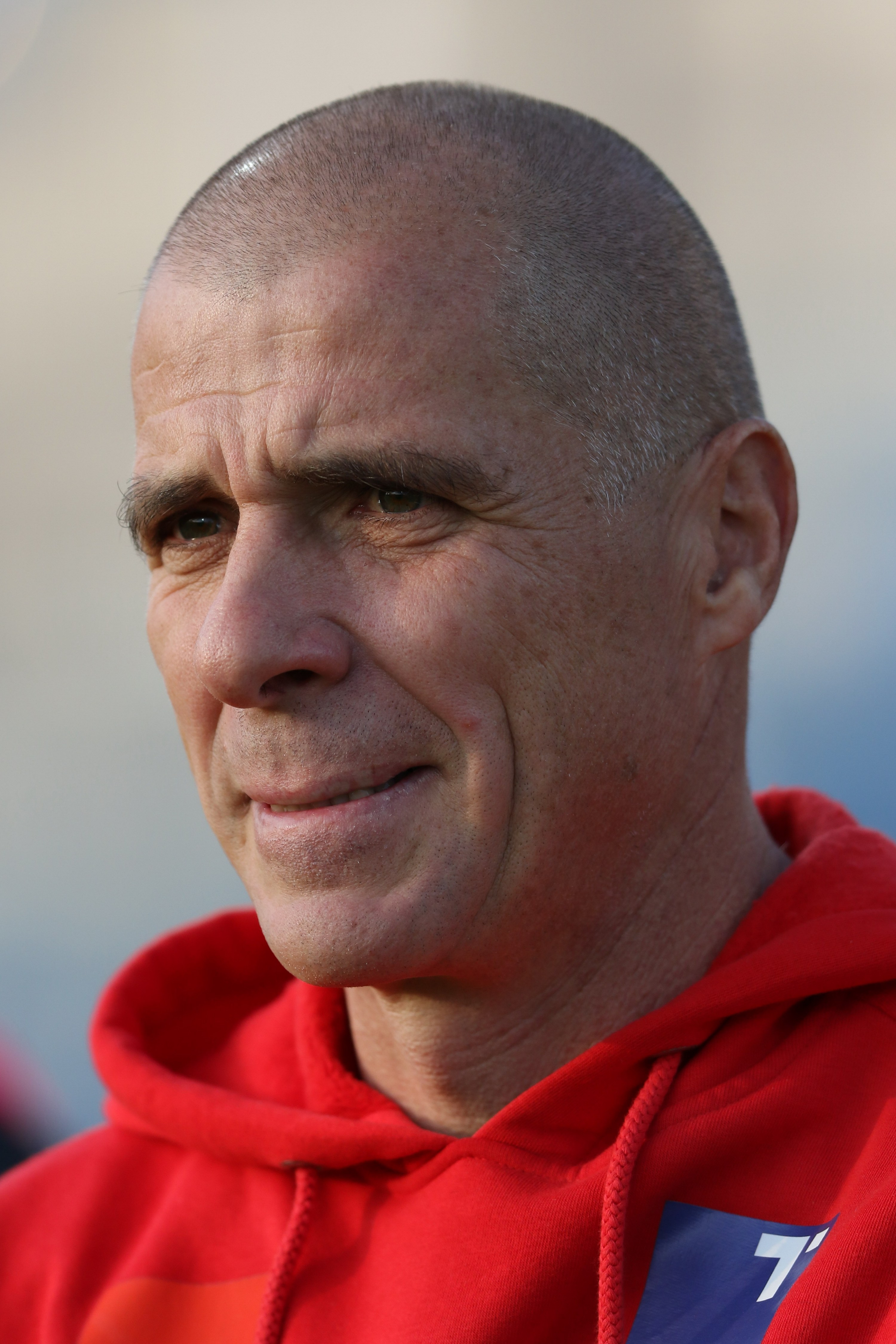
- Schmidt with Wacker Innsbruck in 2016

Personal information
- Date of birth: 21 October 1967 (age 59)
- Place of birth: Graz, Austria
- Height: 1.78 m (5 ft 10 in)
- Position: Midfielder

Team information
- Current team: Eintracht Frankfurt (assistant)

Senior career*
Years	Team	Apps	(Gls)
–1989	SV Thörl		
1989	LUV Graz	9	(0)
1990–1992	FC Zeltweg		
1993–1994	SC Weiz		

Managerial career
- 1997–1999: Nachwuchsmodell Kapfenberg
- 1999–2002: Grazer AK (physiotherapist)
- 2002–2007: Grazer AK (assistant)
- 2007: Austria Kärnten (assistant)
- 2007–2008: Austria Kärnten
- 2008–2009: Wiener Neustadt (assistant)
- 2010: Bahrain (assistant)
- 2010–2011: Al Wahda (assistant)
- 2011–2013: Kapfenberger SV (head of youth development)
- 2011–2012: Austria U21 (assistant)
- 2012–2013: Kapfenberger SV
- 2014: SV Austria Salzburg
- 2014–2016: Wacker Innsbruck
- 2016–2017: Blau-Weiß Linz
- 2017–2018: Rheindorf Altach
- 2018–2019: SV Mattersburg
- 2019–2020: Admira Wacker
- 2021: Admira Wacker
- 2022: TSV Hartberg
- 2023: Rheindorf Altach
- 2023–2026: Monaco (assistant)
- 2026–: Eintracht Frankfurt (assistant)
- * Club domestic league appearances and goals

Klaus Schmidt (born 21 October 1967) is an Austrian football coach and former player who is assistant coach at Bundesliga club Eintracht Frankfurt.

== Coaching career ==
On 2 September 2019 Schmidt was hired by Admira Wacker.

On 7 March 2022, he signed a 1.5-year contract with TSV Hartberg. He was dismissed on 14 November 2022. In 2023, he was appointed as the manager of Austrian club Rheindorf Altach.
