= SC Rheindorf Altach =

Association football club in Austria

Rheindorf Altach
- Full name: Sportclub Rheindorf Altach
- Founded: 26 December 1929; 96 years ago
- Ground: CASHPOINT Arena
- Capacity: 8,500
- President: Peter Pfanner
- Head coach: Ognjen Zarić
- League: Austrian Bundesliga
- 2025–26: Austrian Bundesliga, 9th of 12
- Website: www.scra.at
Home colours	Away colours

Sportclub Rheindorf Altach, also known as Rheindorf Altach, SCR Altach or simply SCRA, is an Austrian association football club based in Altach, Vorarlberg. It plays in the Austrian Football Bundesliga. The club is currently also known as CASHPOINT SCR Altach due to sponsorship of Austrian sports betting company Cashpoint.

== History ==
=== Foundation and early history ===
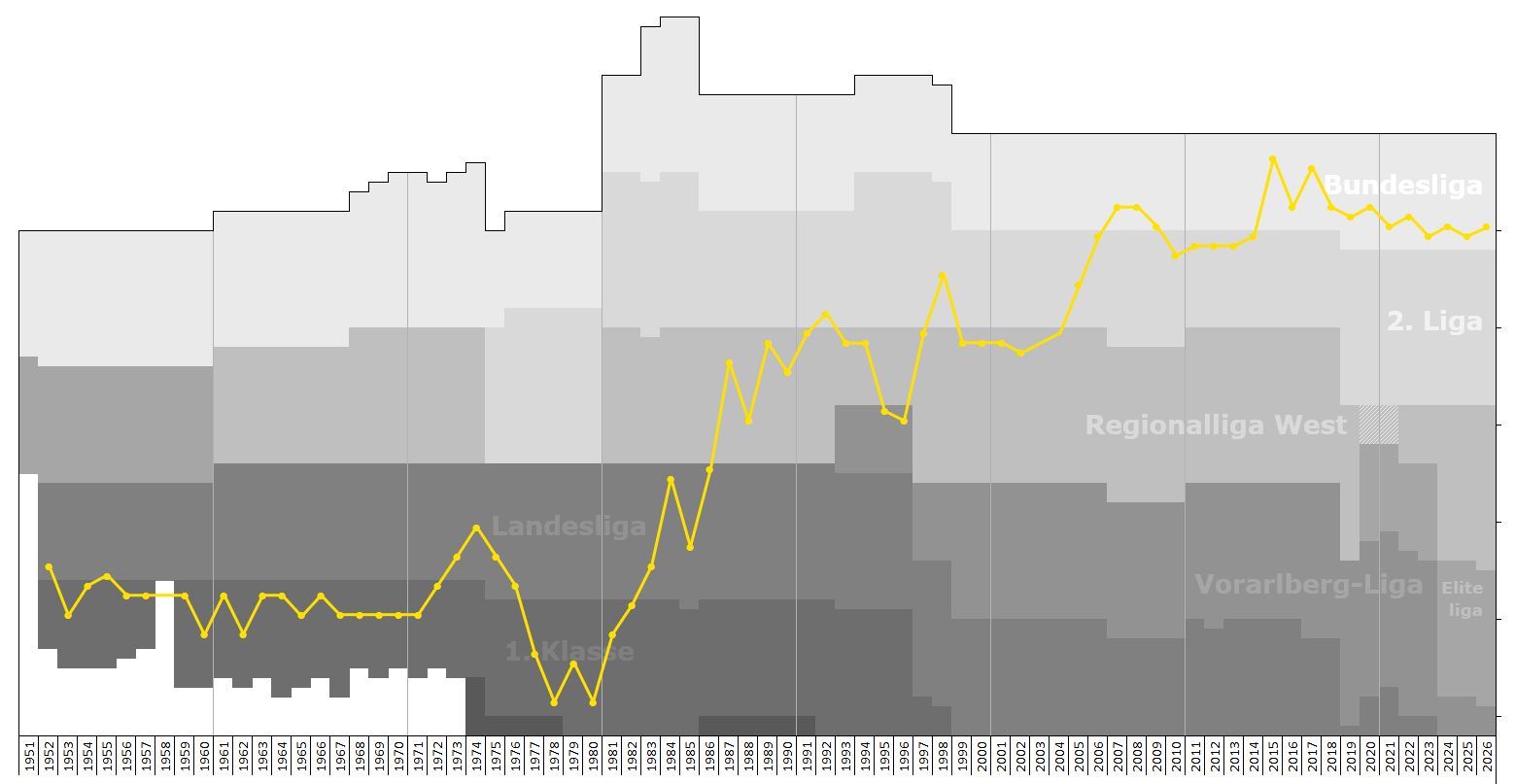
Historical chart of SCR Altach league performance

The club was founded on 26 December 1929 as the football section of the gymnastics and sports club Turnerbund Altach. In 1930, they started to compete in the Vorarlberger B-Klasse as FA Turnerbund Altach, but the club temporarily ceased to exist in 1937 and was not reorganised until the foundation of the Sportvereinigung Altach sports society on 1 March 1946. The sports society ceased to exist in 1949, with its football section becoming independent on 5 March 1949 and renaming itself to Sportclub Rheindorf Altach.

=== First successes (1986–2003) ===
In 1986, Rheindorf Altach were able to assert themselves for the first time in the Landesliga Vorarlberg and were promoted to the third-tier Regionalliga West. They were able to quickly establish themselves among the leading clubs and after a second-place finish in 1989, they reached the Second League for the first time in club history by winning the title in 1991, clearly ahead of Salzburger AK 1914. As bottom of the table, the club were embroiled in a relegation playoff fight, and in the end suffered relegation by one point. It was not until 1997 that they managed to return as Regionalliga champions, but again relegated in the 1997–98 season by one point. In 2003, the club were in the Second League once again, and avoided a third direct relegation by beating FC Lustenau 07 by a total score of 6–4.

=== Reaching the Bundesliga (2004–2014) ===
After surviving in the Second League in the 2003–04 season, the club managed to establish themselves in the second division and was eventually promoted to the first-division Bundesliga after finishing first in the Second League in the 2005–06 season, securing the promotion with a 1–0 win over Austria Lustenau in the penultimate match of the season. Rheindorf Altach stayed in top level until relegation in 2008–09 season. They finished the Second League as third place in 2009–10, as 2nd in 2010–11, 2011–12 and 2012–13 seasons. They finally promoted to top level in 2013–14 season.

=== Into Europe (2014–2017) ===
They finished the 2014–15 Bundesliga season in third place. With 59 points, they outperformed Grazer AK as the highest finishing promoted team in Bundesliga history. The club also qualified for the third qualifying round of the 2015–16 UEFA Europa League, something no club from the region of Vorarlberg had ever achieved before. After two wins against Portuguese club Vitória de Guimarães with 6–2 aggregate score, Altach advanced to the play-off round. There, after a 1–0 loss at home in the first leg and a goalless draw in the second leg, Altach failed to advance against Belenenses. In the second year after promotion, Altach finished the 2015–16 Bundesliga season in eighth place with 40 points. The double burden at the beginning of the season with the Europa League and numerous injuries meant that the team struggled and were threatened by relegation until the end of the season. The 2016–17 season had its ups and downs. The club sensationally ended 2016 as Winterkönig. In November, manager Damir Canadi moved to Rapid Wien. Under his successor Martin Scherb, Altach finished the spring as the second-worst team, eventually finishing fourth. Red Bull Salzburg's cup win over Rapid Wien, however, ensured that Rheindorf Altach once again made the Europa League qualifiers the following season.

In the first qualifying round of the 2017–18 UEFA Europa League, Altach beat Georgian club Chikhura Sachkhere by 2–1 on aggregate. They also advanced through the second and third round, winning 4–1 on aggregate over Belarusian club Dynamo Brest and Belgian club Gent, respectively. In the play-off round, they narrowly failed to beat Israeli club Maccabi Tel Aviv with an overall score of 3–2.

=== Relegation battles (2017–present) ===
The 2017–18 season got off to a moderate start under new coach Klaus Schmidt. After a total of 31 total competitive matches in the autumn, they finished 2017 in seventh place. They eventually finished the season in eighth place, and Schmidt was dismissed at the end of the season. His successor for the 2018–19 season was Werner Grabherr, who had already managed the club twice as a caretaker. He struggled as full-time coach, however, and in March 2019 he was fired with the club bottom of the league table. After two weeks with Wolfgang Luisser as interim coach, former Rheindorf Altach player Alex Pastoor took over at the end of the month. Under the Dutchman, the Vorarlberg side stabilised again and finally managed to stay in the league at the end of the season, eight points ahead of relegated Wacker Innsbruck. In the 2019–20 season, they were in mid-table for the entire season and finished the season in eighth place, which meant they were eligible to play-offs for European football, although they were eliminated in the first round by Austria Wien. In the 2020–21 season, they were again in a relegation battle throughout the season, and in February 2021, Pastoor was released with Altach bottom of the league table. Altach coaching legend Damir Canadi took over the club for a second time. Under his guidance, the team managed to stay in the league, ten points ahead of relegated SKN St. Pölten. At the beginning of the 2021–22 season, however, Altach would also struggle under Canadi, and during the winter break he was released from his position. Altach's failure this time was mainly due to a poor goal tally. At the winter break, they had only scored ten goals and thus had the worst performing attack in the league, while Admira had the second-worst offence with 21 goals. In addition it came forward in December 2021 that key players Atdhe Nuhiu and Jan Zwischenbrugger had rallied against manager Canadi, initially without his knowledge, and had tried to change the team tactics internally. Former Switzerland international Ludovic Magnin was appointed new head coach on 30 December 2021. Altach finished the 2021–22 season in 11th place, securing survival with a one-point lead above the relegation zone. At the end of the season, Magnin activated a release clause in his contract and left the club to join Lausanne-Sport.

For the 2022–23 season, Miroslav Klose was appointed as head coach. After 24 competitive matches, Klose was dismissed and replaced by Klaus Schmidt, who had previously coached the club. Schmidt secured the team's top-flight status on the penultimate matchday, but he left the club voluntarily at the end of the season. Joachim Standfest, previously the assistant coach, took over as head coach for the 2023–24 season and led the team to a 10th-place finish.

== Stadium ==
From 1950 to 1990, Rheindorf Altach played at the Sportplatz Riedle. Since the opening of Stadion Schnabelholz in June 1990, Sportplatz Riedle has only been used as a training ground for the youth academy. As a result of promotion to the Austrian Bundesliga, the stadium was further expanded, and in winter 2007 a new west stand was built and the capacity increased to 8,500 spectators with 3,000 seats, with the name being changed to Cashpoint Arena for sponsorship reasons. In the summer of 2015, further investments were made in the stadium. The pitch was expanded to international standard, and the field now measures 105 metres long by 68 metres wide and is provided with undersoil-heating. Furthermore, the floodlight system was upgraded, and the final expansion of the west stand added around 500 covered seats. Further plans envisage a new construction of the south stand including a roof. In the future, European games will no longer be played in Innsbruck as before, but in Altach.

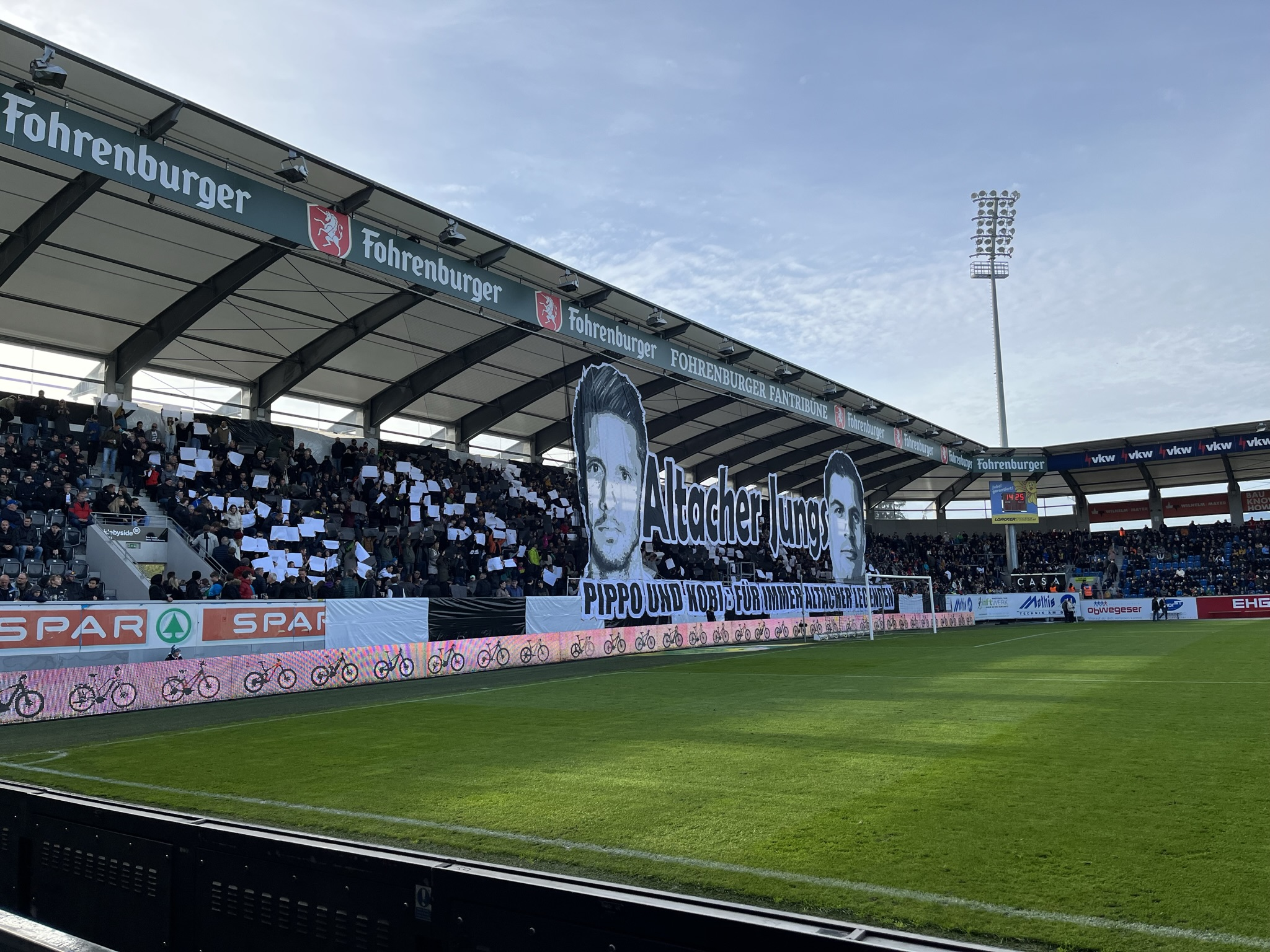
The Altach fans' stand with a tifo before a match against Sturm Graz. (2022)

== European competition history ==
=== Overall record ===
Accurate as of 8 August 2018

Competition	Played	Won	Drew	Lost	GF	GA	GD	Win%
UEFA Cup / UEFA Europa League	12	5	5	2	18	10	+8	41.67
Total	12	5	5	2	18	10	+8	41.67

Legend: GF = Goals For. GA = Goals Against. GD = Goal Difference.

- Q = Qualification
- PO = Play-Off
- QF = Quarter-final
- SF = Semi-final

=== Matches ===
Season	Competition	Round	Opponent	Home	Away	Aggregate
2015–16	UEFA Europa League	3Q	(Portugal) Vitória S.C.	2–1	4–1	6–2
2015–16	UEFA Europa League	PO	(Portugal) Belenenses	0–1	0–0	0–1
2017–18	UEFA Europa League	1Q	(Georgia (country)) Chikhura Sachkhere	1–1	1–0	2–1
2017–18	UEFA Europa League	2Q	(Belarus) Dinamo Brest	1–1	3–0	4–1
2017–18	UEFA Europa League	3Q	(Belgium) Gent	3–1	1–1	4–2
2017–18	UEFA Europa League	PO	(Israel) Maccabi Tel Aviv	0–1	2–2	2–3

== Affiliated clubs ==
The following clubs are currently affiliated with Rheindorf Altach:

- (Austria) AKA Hypo Vorarlberg (regional youth academy)

== Players ==
=== Current squad ===
As of 8 September 2026

Note: Flags indicate national team as defined under FIFA eligibility rules; some limited exceptions apply. Players may hold more than one non-FIFA nationality.

No.	Pos.	Nation	Player
1	GK	AUT	Dejan Stojanović
4	DF	BRA	Henrique Bell
6	MF	KOS	Vesel Demaku
7	MF	AUT	Denizcan Cosgun
8	MF	GER	Mike-Steven Bähre
9	FW	AUT	Marko Raguž
10	FW	SWE	Ousmane Diawara
11	FW	JPN	Shingo Nakano
16	DF	SWE	Rassa Rahmani
17	MF	AUT	Lukas Jäger (captain)
18	MF	AUT	Patrick Greil
19	FW	SRB	Srđan Hrstić
20	MF	TUR	Erkin Yalcin

No.	Pos.	Nation	Player
21	DF	AUT	Jakob Brandtner
22	MF	AUT	Yanis Eisschill
23	DF	AUT	Benedikt Zech
24	FW	BFA	Salif Tietietta
27	DF	AUT	Filip Milojević
28	MF	FRA	Yann Massombo
29	DF	GER	Niklas Niehoff (on loan from Holstein Kiel)
30	GK	AUT	Elias Scherf
31	GK	AUT	Daniel Antosch
33	GK	AUT	Paul Piffer
34	MF	AUT	Adrian Vonbrül
37	DF	AUT	Benjamin Böckle
39	FW	GER	Rodney Elongo-Yombo

== Club staff ==
As of 7 November 2024

Position	Staff
President	(Austria) Peter Pfanner
Vice-president	(Austria) Werner Gunz
Honorary president	(Austria) Johannes Engl (Austria) Karlheinz Kopf
Chief executive officer	(Austria) Christoph Längle
Sporting director	(Austria) Roland Kirchler
Head coach	(Serbia) Ognjen Zarić
Assistant coach	(Cameroon) Louis Mahop (Kosovo) Atdhe Nuhiu (Austria) Ahmet Cil
Goalkeeping coach	(Austria) Ramazan Özcan
Fitness coach	(Austria) Rudolf Gussnig
Athletic coach	(Austria) Dario Müller
Chief scout	(Germany) Marc-André Kriegl
Club doctor	(Austria) Dieter Moosmann
Physiotherapists	(Austria) Sebastian Halder (Austria) Julien Bernhart (Austria) Dominik Müller
Team manager	(Austria) Mario Mayer (Austria) Oliver Jakob

== Managerial history ==
- (Germany) Peter Kohl (1 July 1993 – 30 June 1994)
- (Federal Republic of Yugoslavia) Rade Plakalović (1 July 1994 – Sept 3, 1995)
- (Poland) Tadeusz Pawłowski (10 Sept 1995 – 30 June 1999)
- (Austria) Alfons Dobler (1 July 1999 – 30 June 2001)
- (Germany) Ewald Schmid (1 July 2001 – 17 Dec 2002)
- (Austria) Hans-Jürgen Trittinger (1 Jan 2003 – 30 June 2005)
- (Austria) Michael Streiter (1 July 2005 – 19 April 2007)
- (Serbia) Rade Plakalović (interim) (20 April 2007 – 25 May 2007)
- (Germany) Manfred Bender (1 July 2007 – 23 Jan 2008)
- (Austria) Heinz Fuchsbichler (23 Jan 2008 – 30 Aug 2008)
- (Switzerland) Urs Schönenberger (Sept 4, 2008 – 12 Jan 2009)
- (Austria) Georg Zellhofer (12 Jan 2009 – 30 June 2009)
- (Austria) Adi Hütter (1 July 2009 – 6 April 2012)
- (Germany) Edmund Stöhr (6 April 2012 – 30 June 2012)
- (Germany) Rainer Scharinger (1 July 2012 – 4 Jan 2013)
- (Austria) Damir Canadi (7 Jan 2013 – 11 Nov 2016)
- (Austria) Werner Grabherr (interim) (11 Nov 2016 – 23 Dec 2016)
- (Austria) Martin Scherb (23 Dec 2016 – 9 Jun 2017)
- (Austria) Klaus Schmidt (9 June 2017 – 30 June 2018)
- (Austria) Werner Grabherr (1 July 2018 – 3 March 2019)
- (Austria) Wolfgang Luisser (interim) (3 March 2019 – 18 March 2019)
- (Netherlands) Alex Pastoor (18 March 2019 – 23 February 2021)
- (Austria) Damir Canadi (24 February 2021 – 17 December 2021)
- (Switzerland) Ludovic Magnin (30 December 2021 – 23 May 2022)
- (Germany) Miroslav Klose (17 June 2022 – 20 March 2023)
- (Austria) Klaus Schmidt (21 March 2023 – 30 June 2023)
- (Austria) Joachim Standfest (1 July 2023 – 30 September 2024)
- (Austria) Fabio Ingolitsch (9 October 2024 – 29 December 2025)
- (Serbia) Ognjen Zaric (9 January 2026 – )
