= Rassa Rahmani =

Swedish footballer (born 1999

Personal information
- Full name: Rassa Rahmani
- Date of birth: 14 December 1999 (age 26)
- Place of birth: Malmö, Sweden
- Height: 1.86 m (6 ft 1 in)
- Position: Defender

Team information
- Current team: SCR Altach
- Number: 16

Youth career
- 2004–2016: BK Olympic

Senior career*
Years	Team	Apps	(Gls)
2017–2020	BK Olympic	78	(14)
2021–2023	Dalkurd FF	82	(7)
2024–2025	Landskrona BoIS	56	(2)
2026–	SCR Altach	5	(0)
- * Club domestic league appearances and goals as of 4 July 2026

Rassa Rahmani (born 14 December 1999) is a Swedish professional footballer who plays as a defender for Austrian Bundesliga club SCR Altach.

== Career ==
After rising through the lower tiers with his boyhood club BK Olympic, Rahmani signed for Dalkurd FF where head coach Mesut Meral helped develop him into a defender. Ahead of 2024, he signed for Superettan team Landskrona BoIS, where he quickly established himself as one of the most important players in the squad. Following two seasons with Di Randige, in early 2026 Rahmani signed for SCR Altach in the Austrian Bundesliga. He made his debut for the team as a starter in a 0–0 draw in the league against TSV Hartberg on 14 February 2026.

== Style of play ==
Rahmani is a left-footed defender who excels at progressing the ball forward and passing into the final third.
