= Tom Ritzy Hülsmann =

German footballer (born 2004)

Personal information
- Date of birth: 11 April 2004 (age 22)
- Place of birth: Trier, Germany
- Height: 2.05 m (6 ft 9 in)
- Position: Goalkeeper

Team information
- Current team: Stade de Reims
- Number: 1

Youth career
- VfL Trier
- –2017: Eintracht Trier
- 2017–2022: Bayern Munich

Senior career*
Years	Team	Apps	(Gls)
2021–2025	Bayern Munich II	29	(0)
2023–2025	Bayern Munich	0	(0)
2024–2025	→ SKN St. Pölten (loan)	28	(0)
2025–2026	TSV Hartberg	30	(0)
2026–	Stade de Reims	0	(0)
- * Club domestic league appearances and goals as of 2 July 2026

Tom Ritzy Hülsmann (born 11 April 2004) is a German professional footballer who plays as a goalkeeper for Ligue 2 club Stade de Reims.

== Early life ==
Hülsmann goes by his middle name, Ritzy.

== Career ==
=== Bayern Munich ===
Hülsmann joined the youth academy of German club Bayern Munich at the age of twelve from Eintracht Trier. On the beginning of the 2023–24 season, he was called up for the Bayern Munich senior team as the backup goalkeeper to Sven Ulreich, after the team transferred Yann Sommer and the starting goalkeeper Manuel Neuer was still recovering from an injury, Hülsmann also established himself as the first option for the reserve team Bayern Munich II. He featured on the bench for the 2023 DFL-Supercup match on 12 August 2023 against RB Leipzig that ended 0–3 as a defeat. He also started the Bundesliga season as the second goalkeeper.

On 23 August 2023, Hülsmann signed a professional contract with Bayern Munich until 30 June 2026.

==== Loan to SKN St. Pölten ====
On 3 July 2024, he joined Austrian 2. Liga club SKN St. Pölten on a season-long loan.

=== TSV Hartberg ===
On 15 July 2025, Hülsmann joined Austrian Bundesliga club TSV Hartberg, permanently for an undisclosed fee.

=== Stade de Reims ===
On 29 June 2026, he moved to France and signed with Ligue 2 club Stade Reims, ahead of the 2026–27 season.

== International career ==
He was one of the players who were called up with the Germany U21 national team by head coach Antonio Di Salvo for the friendly match against Croatia U21 on 18 November 2026.

== Career statistics ==
=== Club ===
As of match played 7 February 2026

Appearances and goals by club, season and competition
Club	Season	League			Cup (Note: Includes Austrian Cup)		Total	
Club	Season	Division	Apps	Goals	Apps	Goals	Apps	Goals
Bayern Munich II	2021–22	Regionalliga Bayern	3	0	—		3	0
Bayern Munich II	2022–23	Regionalliga Bayern	7	0	—		7	0
Bayern Munich II	2023–24	Regionalliga Bayern	19	0	—		19	0
Bayern Munich II	Total		29	0	—		29	0
Bayern Munich	2023–24	Bundesliga	0	0	0	0	0	0
Bayern Munich	Total		0	0	0	0	0	0
SKN St. Pölten (loan)	2024–25	2. Liga	24	0	1	0	25	0
SKN St. Pölten (loan)	Total		24	0	1	0	25	0
TSV Hartberg	2025–26	Austrian Bundesliga	17	0	3	0	20	0
TSV Hartberg	Total		17	0	3	0	20	0
Career Total			70	0	4	0	74	0

== Style of play ==
Hülsmann is known for his height.

== Personal life ==
Hülsmann is a native of Trier, Germany. He has regarded Germany international Manuel Neuer as his football idol. His younger brother Gregory Randy Hülsmann ias also a footballer and plays as a goalkeeper as well.
