= Niklas Niehoff =

German footballer (born 2004)

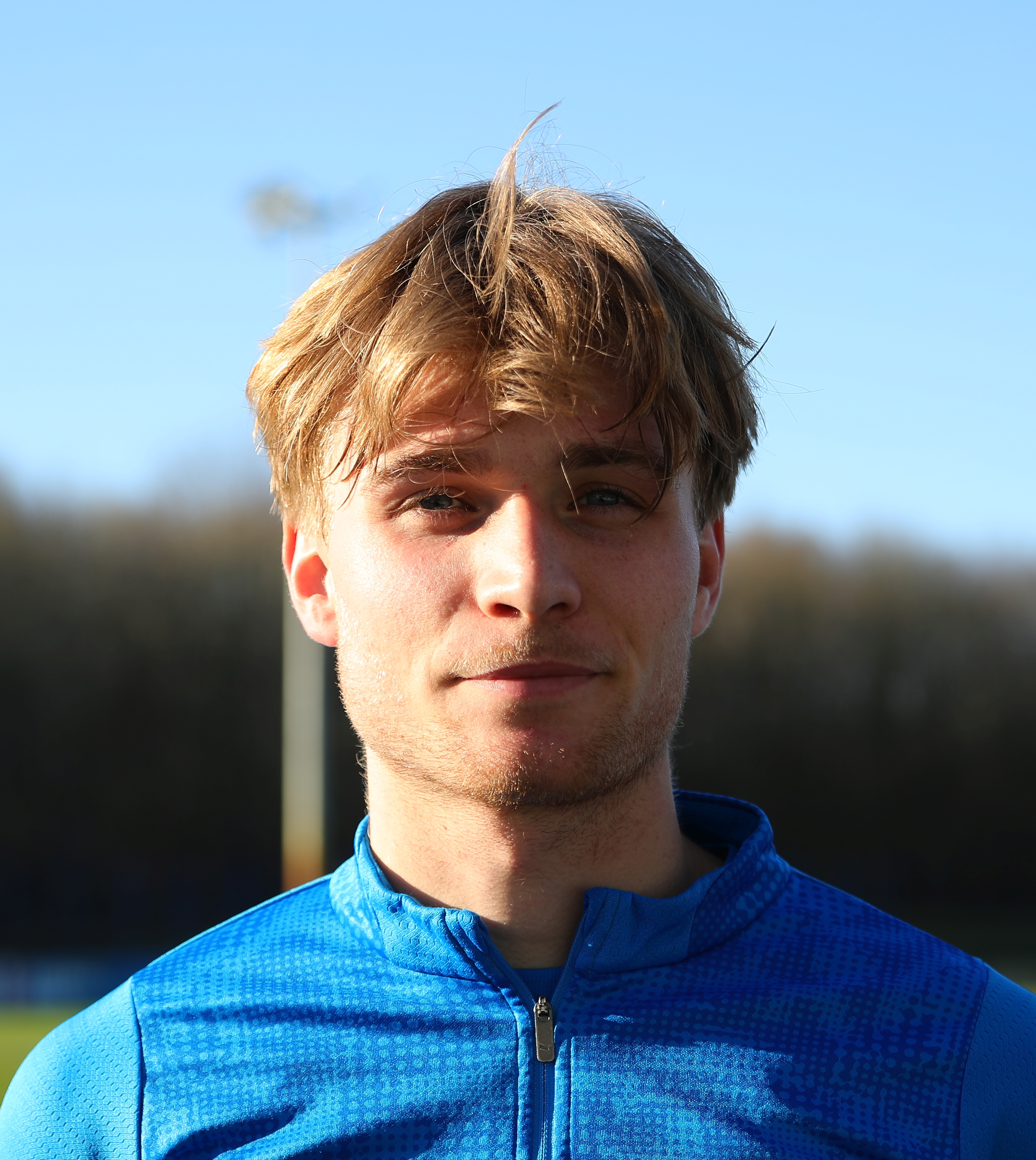
- Niehoff in 2026

Personal information
- Date of birth: 20 August 2004 (age 22)
- Place of birth: Wietmarschen, Germany
- Height: 1.87 m (6 ft 2 in)
- Positions: Right-back; right winger

Team information
- Current team: SCR Altach (on loan from Holstein Kiel)
- Number: 29

Youth career
- SV Wietmarschen
- –2018: Vorwärts Nordhorn
- 2018–2020: SV Meppen
- 2020–2023: Holstein Kiel

Senior career*
Years	Team	Apps	(Gls)
2023–	Holstein Kiel	31	(2)
2023–	Holstein Kiel II	61	(18)
2024–2025	→ VfL Osnabrück (loan)	33	(2)
2026–	→ SCR Altach (loan)	0	(0)

International career^{‡}
2021–2022	Germany U18	7	(2)
2022–2023	Germany U19	2	(1)
- * Club domestic league appearances and goals as of 18 May 2026 ‡ National team caps and goals as of 22:56, 20 December 2025 (UTC)

Timon Niehoff (born 20 August 2004) is a German professional footballer who plays as a right-back and right winger for Austrian Bundesliga club SCR Altach, on loan from 2. Bundesliga club Holstein Kiel. He is a former Germany youth international.

== Club career ==
=== Holstein Kiel ===
A Wietmarschen native, Niehoff began playing football at a local club. Following stints at Vorwärts Nordhorn and SV Meppen he joined Holstein Kiel's youth department in 2020.

Niehoff made four appearances for Holstein Kiel's first team in the 2. Bundesliga.

Niehoff returned to Holstein Kiel in summer 2025 and helped Kiel beat Hamburger SV in the quarter-final of the 2025–26 DFB-Pokal.

==== Loan to VfL Osnabrück ====
He moved to 3. Liga club VfL Osnabrück on loan for the 2024–25 season. At Osnabrück, Niehoff was a starter. He made 33 league appearances, scoring twice and providing five assists while Osnabrück fought relegation.

==== Loan to SCR Altach ====
On 18 July 2026, Niehoff moved on a new loan to SCR Altach in the Austrian Bundesliga for the 2026–27 season.

== Personal life ==
In October 2025 Niehoff shared a flat with Holstein Kiel teammate Lasse Rosenboom.

== Style of play ==
After starting out as a forward, Niehoff was converted to a right-sided player during his time at VfL Osnabrück.

== Career statistics ==
As of match played 20 December 2025

Appearances and goals by club, season and competition
Club	Season	League			National cup (Note: Includes DFB-Pokal.)		Total	
Club	Season	Division	Apps	Goals	Apps	Goals	Apps	Goals
Holstein Kiel II	2021–22	Regionalliga Nord	7	2	–		7	2
Holstein Kiel II	2022–23	Regionalliga Nord	27	7	–		27	7
Holstein Kiel II	2023–24	Regionalliga Nord	26	8	–		26	8
Holstein Kiel II	2025–26	Oberliga Schleswig-Holstein	1	1	–		1	1
Holstein Kiel II	Total		61	18	0	0	61	18
Holstein Kiel	2023–24	2. Bundesliga	4	1	0	0	4	1
Holstein Kiel	2025–26	2. Bundesliga	13	1	2	0	15	1
Holstein Kiel	Total		17	1	2	0	19	1
VfL Osnabrück (loan)	2024–25	3. Liga	33	2	1	0	34	2
Career total			35	1	4	0	39	1
