= João Sacramento =

Portuguese football manager

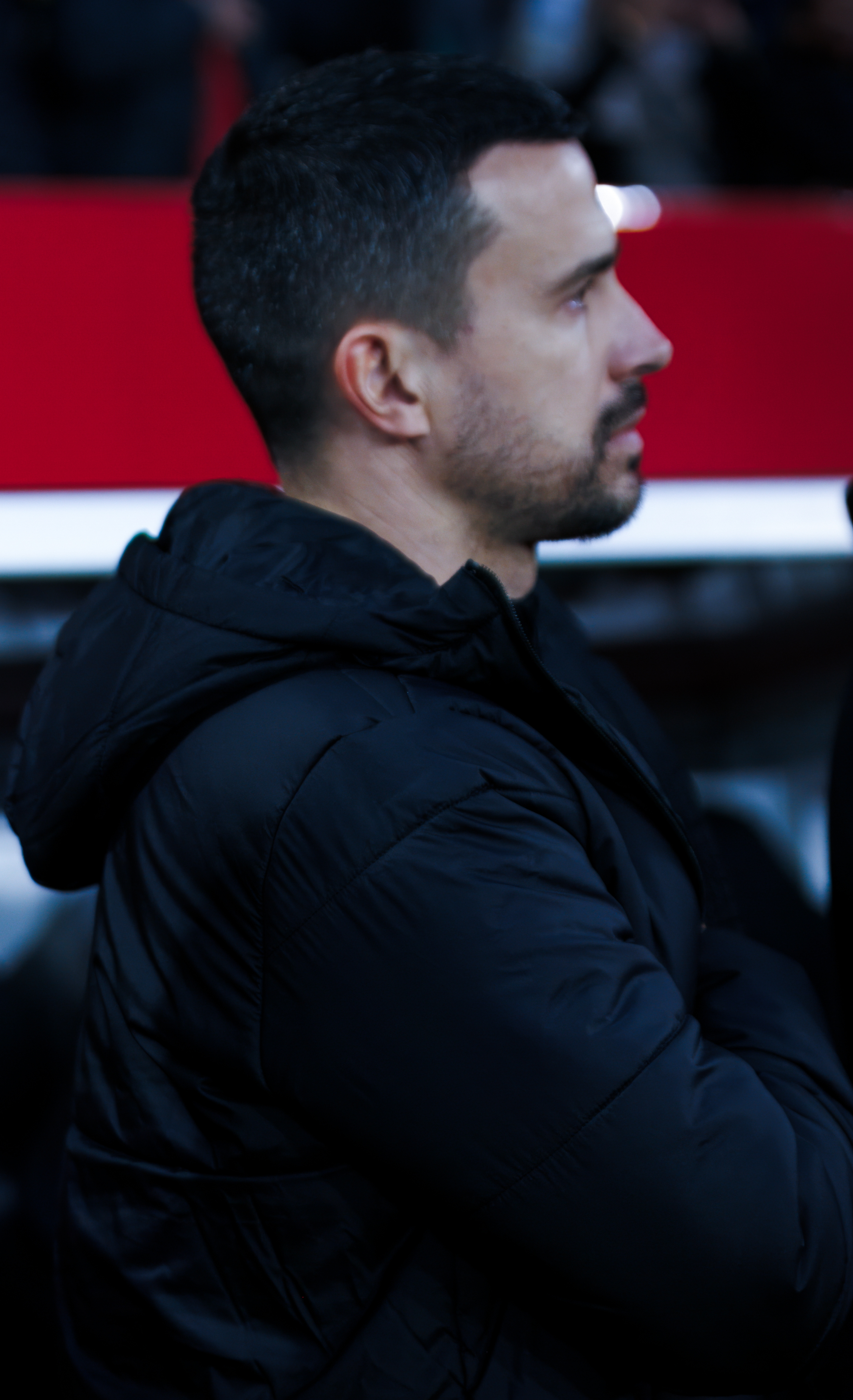

Personal information
- Full name: João Sacramento
- Date of birth: 31 January 1989 (age 37)
- Place of birth: Barcelos, Portugal

Managerial career
- Years: Team
- 2017–2019: Lille (assistant)
- 2019–2021: Tottenham Hotspur (assistant)
- 2021: Roma (assistant)
- 2022–2023: Paris Saint-Germain (assistant)
- 2023–2025: Al-Duhail (assistant)
- 2025: LASK
- 2026–: Morocco (assistant)

João Pedro Machado Sacramento (born 31 January 1989) is a Portuguese football manager. He is currently the assistant manager of the Moroccan national football team.

== Early life ==
Sacramento was born in Portugal to Ernestino Sacramento, an electrical engineer, and his wife.

== Playing career ==
Sacramento played as a midfielder in Portugal before attending university.

== College career ==
Sacramento attended the University of Glamorgan in Wales.

== Managerial career ==
In 2020, Sacramento was appointed assistant manager to José Mourinho at English Premier League side Tottenham. Previously, he was assistant manager of French Ligue 1 side Lille.

He later joined Mourinho at Roma in 2021, before serving as assistant coach to Christophe Galtier at both Paris Saint-Germain and Al-Duhail.

In June 2025, Sacramento became the head coach of Austrian side LASK. He left the club after a mutually agreed contract termination on 23 September 2025.

On the 5th of March, Sacramento's appointment as assistant manager of the Moroccan national team was made public in a press conference held by the Royal Moroccan Football Federation.

== Managerial Honours ==
=== Assistant Manager ===
Paris Saint-Germain

- Ligue 1: 2022–23

Al-Duhail

- QSL Cup: 2024–25

== Personal life ==
Sacramento has been able speak French, Spanish, and Portuguese.

== Managerial statistics ==
As of match played 5 October 2025

Managerial record by team and tenure
Team	From	To	Record							
Team	From	To	G	W	D	L	GF	GA	GD	Win %
LASK	1 July 2025	23 September 2025	11	4	1	6	15	18	−3	36.36
Total			11	4	1	6	15	18	−3	36.36
