= Christoph Längle =

Austrian politician (born 1979)

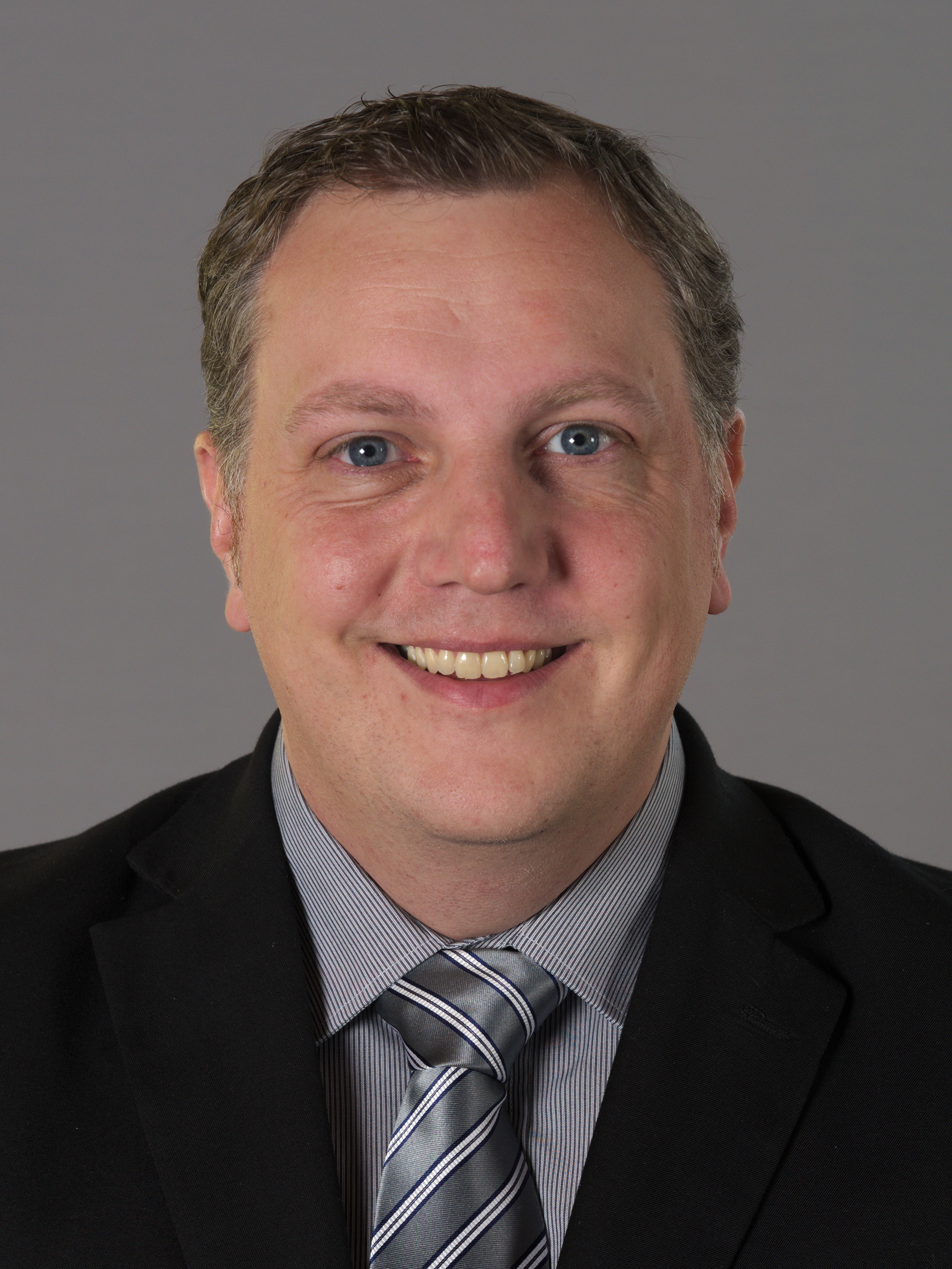

Member of the Federal Council
- Incumbent
- Assumed office 15 October 2014

Personal details
- Born: 20 October 1979 (age 46) Hohenems, Austria
- Party: Independent (was Freedom Party of Austria)

Christoph Längle (born 20 October 1979) is an Austrian politician who has been a Member of the Federal Council. He has been appointed by the state parliament of Vorarlberg (Vorarlberger Landtag) as a member of the Federal Council for the Freedom Party of Austria (FPÖ) in 2014. In May 2019, he left the Freedom Party and served as an independent member of the Federal Council since then.
