= Kasper Jørgensen =

Kasper Jørgensen may refer to:

- Kasper Jørgensen (handballer)
- Kasper Jørgensen (footballer)
- Kasper Winther Jørgensen, Danish rower
