= Ognjen Zarić =

Serbian football manager (born 1989)

Personal information
- Date of birth: 14 January 1989 (age 37)
- Place of birth: Teslić, Yugoslavia

Team information
- Current team: SCR Altach (manager)

Managerial career
- Years: Team
- 2010–2014: Kufstein (youth)
- 2017–2018: Unterhaching (youth)
- 2018–2019: 1860 Rosenheim
- 2019–2020: Kufstein
- 2020–2023: Basel (youth)
- 2024: Winterthur
- 2026–: SCR Altach

Ognjen Zarić (Serbian Cyrillic: Огњен Зарић; born 1 January 1989) is a Bosnian football manager who manages Austrian Bundesliga club SCR Altach.

== Life and career ==
Zarić was born on 1 January 1989 in Teslić, which was then Yugoslavia. He moved with his family to Austria at the age of four. He holds Serbian and Austrian citizenship. He grew up in Kufstein, Austria. He aspired to become a professional footballer as a child. He began studying law but soon gave it up. He has been nicknamed "Ogi". He has three children.

Zarić started his managerial career at the age of twenty. In 2010, he was appointed as a youth manager of Austrian side FC Kufstein. After that, he worked as a youth manager at a German boarding school. In 2017, he was appointed as a youth manager of German side SpVgg Unterhaching. He helped the club achieve eighth place in the league. In 2018, he was appointed manager of German side TSV 1860 Rosenheim. In 2019, he was appointed manager of Austrian side FC Kufstein.

In 2020, he was appointed as a youth manager of Swiss side FC Basel. In 2024, he was appointed manager of Swiss side FC Winterthur. He previously served as assistant manager to Swiss manager Patrick Rahmen. At the age of thirty-five, he became the youngest manager in the Swiss top flight. He managed his first game for the club during a 1–0 win over St. Gallen. Despite the strong start, Winterthur's performances during the first half of the season were inconsistent at best and at the winter break they found themselves at the bottom of the league. As a result, Zarić was dismissed on 17 December 2024.

In early 2026, Zarić returned to Austria and was appointed head coach of Austrian Bundesliga club SCR Altach. He succeeded Fabio Ingolitsch, who had left the club to join SK Sturm Graz.
