= Ousmane Diawara =

Malian association footballer

Personal information
- Date of birth: 10 October 1999 (age 27)
- Place of birth: Bamako, Mali
- Height: 1.87 m (6 ft 2 in)
- Position: Striker

Team information
- Current team: Rheindorf Altach
- Number: 10

Youth career
- –2016: Vasalunds IF
- 2017–2018: FC Djursholm

Senior career*
Years	Team	Apps	(Gls)
2019	IFK Stocksund	17	(1)
2019	NEROCA	14	(1)
2020	Huddinge IF	11	(6)
2021	Karlbergs BK	27	(22)
2022–2023	Landskrona BoIS	50	(17)
2024–	Rheindorf Altach	45	(6)
2024	→ Rheindorf Altach II	3	(4)
2024	→ KuPS (loan)	12	(4)
- * Club domestic league appearances and goals as of 10 June 2026

Ousmane Diawara (born 10 October 1999) is a Malian professional footballer who plays as a striker for Austrian Football Bundesliga club Rheindorf Altach.

== Club career ==
Born in Mali, Diaward played at youth level for Swedish club FC Djursholm. He had had 29 goals in 31 appearances for the club. He has featured in the Swedish competitions namely U19 Allsvenskan Norra, U19 Allsvenskan Norra Nedflyttningsserie and U19 Allsvenskan Norra - vår in 2017 and 2018.

On 27 March 2019, Diawara joined Division 2 side IFK Stocksund. He played 17 league games, scoring once, as well as one Svenska Cupen game.

In 2021 Diawara joined BK Karlberg. He played 27 league games, scoring 22 goals in total.

Diawara signed a three-year contract with Landskrona BoIS on 30 November 2021. On January 31, 2023, Diawara extended its agreement with Landskrona BoIS until 2025.

On 12 January 2024, Diawara signed with SCR Altach in Austrian Bundesliga on a deal until June 2027.

On 10 July 2024, he was loaned out to Kuopion Palloseura (KuPS) in Finnish Veikkausliiga for the rest of the 2024 season. One week later, he scored in his second appearance for the club, in a UEFA Conference League qualifying win against UNA Strassen. At the end of the season, Diawara and KuPS won the Finnish championship and the 2024 Finnish Cup titles, completing the club's first double.

== Career statistics ==
As of 3 May 2025

Appearances and goals by club, season and competition
Club	Season	League			Cup (Note: Includes Svenska Cupen, Austrian Cup and Suomen Cup)		League cup		Europe		Total	
Club	Season	Division	Apps	Goals	Apps	Goals	Apps	Goals	Apps	Goals	Apps	Goals
IFK Stocksund	2019	Division 2	17	1	1	0	–		–		18	1
NEROCA	2019–20	I-League	14	1	0	0	–		–		14	1
Huddinge IF	2020	Division 2	11	6	–		–		–		11	6
Karlbergs BK	2021	Division 2	27	22	1	0	–		–		28	22
Landskrona BoIS	2022	Superettan	22	8	4	1	–		–		26	9
Landskrona BoIS	2023	Superettan	28	9	4	2	–		–		32	11
Landskrona BoIS	Total		50	17	8	3	0	0	0	0	58	20
Rheindorf Altach	2023–24	Austrian Bundesliga	4	0	1	0	–		–		5	0
Rheindorf Altach	2024–25	Austrian Bundesliga	10	0	0	0	–		–		10	0
Rheindorf Altach	Total		14	0	1	0	0	0	0	0	15	0
Rheindorf Altach II	2023–24	Austrian Regionalliga	3	4	–		–		–		3	4
KuPS (loan)	2024	Veikkausliiga	12	4	1	1	0	0	4 (Note: Appearances in UEFA Conference League)	1	17	6
Career total			149	55	12	4	0	0	4	1	165	60

== Honours ==
KuPS

- Veikkausliiga: 2024
- Finnish Cup: 2024
