= 2022–23 FC Blau-Weiß Linz season =

FC Blau-Weiß Linz
2022–23 season
- Manager: Gerald Scheiblehner
- Stadium: Donauparkstadion
- Austrian Football Second League: 1st (promoted)
- Austrian Cup: Third round
- Top goalscorer: League: Ronivaldo (19); All: Ronivaldo (21)

The 2022–23 season was the 26th in the history of FC Blau-Weiß Linz and their 7th consecutive season in the second division. The club participated in the Austrian Football Second League and the Austrian Cup.

== Players ==
=== First team squad ===
As of 31 August 2022

Note: Flags indicate national team as defined under FIFA eligibility rules; some limited exceptions apply. Players may hold more than one non-FIFA nationality.

| No. | Pos. | Nation | Player |
|---|---|---|---|
| 1 | GK | AUT | Nicolas Schmid |
| 2 | DF | AUT | Fabio Strauss |
| 3 | DF | AUT | Christoph Schösswendter |
| 4 | MF | AUT | Marco Krainz |
| 5 | DF | SRB | Danilo Mitrović |
| 6 | MF | AUT | Tobias Koch |
| 7 | FW | ALB | Anteo Fetahu |
| 8 | DF | AUT | Simon Pirkl |
| 9 | FW | BRA | Ronivaldo |
| 10 | FW | GHA | Paul Mensah |
| 11 | FW | FRA | Fally Mayulu |
| 13 | MF | AUT | Michael Brandner |

| No. | Pos. | Nation | Player |
|---|---|---|---|
| 14 | DF | AUT | Julian Gölles |
| 15 | DF | AUT | Manuel Maranda |
| 17 | DF | AUT | Lukas Rath |
| 18 | MF | AUT | Matthias Seidl |
| 19 | FW | AUT | Fabian Neumayr |
| 20 | MF | AUT | Simon Seidl |
| 21 | GK | AUT | Felix Gschossmann |
| 22 | DF | AUT | Fabian Windhager |
| 23 | MF | AUT | Alexander Briedl |
| 26 | MF | AUT | Lukas Tursch |
| 31 | GK | AUT | Kevin Radulovic |
| 41 | GK | AUT | Armin Sarcevic |

== Transfers ==
=== In ===
| Pos. | Player | Transferred from | Fee | Date | Source |
|---|---|---|---|---|---|
| MF | (Austria) Alexander Briedl | (Austria) SV Horn | Free | 1 July 2022 | |
| DF | (Austria) Lukas Tursch | (Austria) St. Pölten | Free | 1 July 2022 | |
| FW | (Brazil) Ronivaldo | (Austria) Wacker Innsbruck | Free | 1 July 2022 | |
| MF | (Austria) Marco Krainz | (Austria) Floridsdorfer AC | Free | 31 August 2022 | |
| MF | (Germany) Jahn Herrmann | (Germany) Bayern Munich II | Undisclosed | 6 February 2023 | |

== Pre-season and friendlies ==
Win Draw Loss

| 19 June 2022 Friendly | Ludogorets Razgrad (Bulgaria) | 1–0 | (Austria) Blau-Weiß Linz | Bruckhäusl, Austria |
| 17:00 CEST (UTC+2) | | | | Stadium: Sportplatz Bruckhäusl |

| 2 July 2022 Friendly | Sturm Graz (Austria) | 1–1 | (Austria) Blau-Weiß Linz | Schladming, Austria |
| 17:30 CEST (UTC+2) | | | | Stadium: Stadion Schladming |

| 9 July 2022 Friendly | Donau Linz (Austria) | 0–7 | (Austria) Blau-Weiß Linz | Linz, Austria |
| 16:00 CEST (UTC+2) | | | | Stadium: LINZ AG Arena |

| 25 November 2022 Friendly | LASK II (Austria) | 1–5 | (Austria) Blau-Weiß Linz | Pasching, Austria |
| 15:00 CET (UTC+1) | | | | Stadium: Raiffeisen Arena |

| 1 December 2022 Friendly | WSG Tirol (Austria) | 3–4 | (Austria) Blau-Weiß Linz | Wattens, Austria |
| 14:30 CET (UTC+1) | | | | Stadium: Gernot Langes Stadion |

| 14 January 2023 Friendly | Ried (Austria) | 1–1 | (Austria) Blau-Weiß Linz | Ried im Innkreis, Austria |
| 14:00 CET (UTC+1) | | | | Stadium: Stadion Ried - Alt Kunstrasen |

| 24 January 2023 Friendly | SV Wallern (Austria) | 3–7 | (Austria) Blau-Weiß Linz | Austria |
| CET (UTC+1) |

| 27 January 2023 Friendly | Gurten (Austria) | 1–6 | (Austria) Blau-Weiß Linz | Austria |
| 19:00 CET (UTC+1) |

| 1 February 2023 Friendly | Resovia Rzeszów (Poland) | 0–3 | (Austria) Blau-Weiß Linz | Turkey |
| --:-- CET (UTC+1) |

| 5 February 2023 Friendly | Blau-Weiß Linz (Austria) | 5–0 | (Ukraine) Kolos Kovalivka | Turkey |
| 14:00 CET (UTC+1) |

| 12 February 2023 Friendly | Blau-Weiß Linz (Austria) | 2–2 | (Austria) Stripfing | Austria |
| 12:00 CET (UTC+1) |

== Competitions ==
=== Overall record ===
| Competition | First match | Last match | Starting round | Final position | Record | | | | | | | |
| Competition | First match | Last match | Starting round | Final position | Pld | W | D | L | GF | GA | GD | Win % |
|---|---|---|---|---|---|---|---|---|---|---|---|---|
| Austrian Football Second League | 22 July 2022 | 4 June 2023 | Matchday 1 | Winners | 30 | 19 | 4 | 7 | 63 | 27 | +36 | 63.33 |
| Austrian Cup | 16 July 2022 | 19 October 2022 | First round | Third round | 3 | 2 | 0 | 1 | 14 | 4 | +10 | 66.67 |
| Total | | | | | 33 | 21 | 4 | 8 | 77 | 31 | +46 | 63.64 |

Source: Soccerway

=== Austrian Football Second League ===
==== League table ====
| Pos | Team | Pld | W | D | L | GF | GA | GD | Pts | Promotion or relegation |
|---|---|---|---|---|---|---|---|---|---|---|
| 1 | Blau-Weiß Linz (C, P) | 30 | 19 | 4 | 7 | 63 | 27 | +36 | 61 | Promotion to 2023–24 Austrian Football Bundesliga |
| 2 | Grazer AK | 30 | 17 | 9 | 4 | 52 | 29 | +23 | 60 | |
| 3 | SKN St. Pölten | 30 | 17 | 5 | 8 | 53 | 27 | +26 | 56 | |
| 4 | SV Horn | 30 | 13 | 9 | 8 | 38 | 33 | +5 | 48 | |
| 5 | SKU Amstetten | 30 | 12 | 9 | 9 | 49 | 49 | 0 | 45 | |

Updated to match(es) played on 4 June 2023. Source: 2.Liga Table
Rules for classification: 1) Points; 2) Direct Duel; 3) Goal difference; 4) Goals scored; 5) Matches won; 6) Away matches won; 7) Away goals scored
(C) Champions; (P) Promoted

==== Results summary ====
| Overall | | | | | | | | Home | | | | | | Away | | | | | |
| Pld | W | D | L | GF | GA | GD | Pts | W | D | L | GF | GA | GD | W | D | L | GF | GA | GD |
|---|---|---|---|---|---|---|---|---|---|---|---|---|---|---|---|---|---|---|---|
| 30 | 19 | 4 | 7 | 63 | 27 | +36 | 61 | 11 | 2 | 2 | 32 | 11 | +21 | 8 | 2 | 5 | 31 | 16 | +15 |

Source: ADMIRAL 2. Liga

==== Results by round ====
| Round | 1 | 2 | 3 | 4 | 5 | 6 | 7 | 8 | 9 | 10 | 11 | 12 | 13 | 14 | 15 | 16 | 17 | 18 | 19 | 20 | 21 | 22 | 23 | 24 | 25 | 26 | 27 | 28 | 29 | 30 |
|---|---|---|---|---|---|---|---|---|---|---|---|---|---|---|---|---|---|---|---|---|---|---|---|---|---|---|---|---|---|---|
| Ground | A | H | A | H | A | H | A | H | H | A | A | H | A | H | A | H | A | H | A | H | A | H | A | H | A | H | A | H | A | H |
| Result | L | W | L | D | W | W | L | W | L | L | W | W | W | W | W | W | W | W | D | W | L | W | D | W | W | D | W | L | W | W |
| Position | | | | | | | | | | | | | | | | | | | | | | | | | | | | | | |

Source: ADMIRAL 2. Liga
A = Away; H = Home; W = Win; D = Draw; L = Loss

==== Matches ====
The league fixtures were announced on 24 June 2022.

| 4 November 2022 15 | Admira Wacker | 0–4 | Blau-Weiß Linz |

| 12 November 2022 16 | Blau-Weiß Linz | 3–0 | First Vienna | Linz |
| | | | | Stadium: Donauparkstadion |

| 24 February 2023 17 | Vorwärts Steyr | 0–4 | Blau-Weiß Linz |

| 4 March 2023 18 | Blau-Weiß Linz | 2–0 | Kapfenberger SV | Linz |
| | | | | Stadium: Donauparkstadion |

| 10 March 2023 19 | Lafnitz | 1–1 | Blau-Weiß Linz |

| 19 March 2023 20 | Blau-Weiß Linz | 2–1 | Amstetten | Linz |
| | | | | Stadium: Donauparkstadion |

| 31 March 2023 21 | Austria Wien II | 2–1 | Blau-Weiß Linz |

| 8 April 2023 22 | Blau-Weiß Linz | 3–1 | Admira Wacker | Linz |
| | | | | Stadium: Donauparkstadion |

| 14 April 2023 23 | Liefering | 2–2 | Blau-Weiß Linz |

| 22 April 2023 24 | Blau-Weiß Linz | 1–0 | Dornbirn | Linz |
| | | | | Stadium: Donauparkstadion |

| 28 April 2023 25 | Grazer AK | 0–3 | Blau-Weiß Linz | Graz |

| 5 May 2023 26 | Blau-Weiß Linz | 1–1 | Floridsdorfer AC | Linz |
| | | | | Stadium: Donauparkstadion |

| 12 May 2023 27 | St. Pölten | 0–2 | Blau-Weiß Linz |

| 19 May 2023 28 | Blau-Weiß Linz | 0–1 | Horn | Linz |
| | | | | Stadium: Donauparkstadion |

| 26 May 2023 29 | Rapid Wien II | 0–1 | Blau-Weiß Linz |

| 4 June 2023 30 | Blau-Weiß Linz | 2–1 | Sturm Graz II | Linz |
| | | | | Stadium: Donauparkstadion |
