= 2023–24 FC Blau-Weiß Linz season =

FC Blau-Weiß Linz
2023–24 season
- Manager: Gerald Scheiblehner
- Stadium: Donauparkstadion
- Austrian Football Bundesliga: 9th
- Austrian Cup: Third round
- Top goalscorer: League: Ronivaldo (10); All: Ronivaldo (12)

The 2023–24 FC Blau-Weiß Linz season was the club's 27th season in existence and its first season back in the top flight of Austrian football. In addition to the domestic league, FC Blau-Weiß Linz participated in this season's edition of the Austrian Cup. The season covers the period from 1 July 2023 to 30 June 2024.

== Players ==
=== First-team squad ===
Updated 6 August 2023.

Note: Flags indicate national team as defined under FIFA eligibility rules; some limited exceptions apply. Players may hold more than one non-FIFA nationality.

No.	Pos.	Nation	Player
1	GK	AUT	Nicolas Schmid
2	DF	AUT	Fabio Strauss
3	DF	AUT	Erwin Softic
4	MF	AUT	Marco Krainz
5	DF	SRB	Danilo Mitrović
6	MF	AUT	Tobias Koch
7	MF	IRL	Conor Noß
8	DF	AUT	Simon Pirkl
9	FW	BRA	Ronivaldo
10	FW	GHA	Paul Mensah
11	MF	AUT	Raphael Hofer (on loan from Red Bull Salzburg)
12	GK	AUT	Andreas Lukse
13	MF	AUT	Michael Brandner
14	DF	AUT	Julian Gölles

No.	Pos.	Nation	Player
15	DF	AUT	Manuel Maranda
17	DF	AUT	Alem Pasic
18	FW	AUT	Stefan Feiertag
19	MF	AUT	Alexander Briedl
20	MF	AUT	Simon Seidl
21	GK	AUT	Felix Gschossmann
22	DF	AUT	Fabian Windhager
26	MF	AUT	Lukas Tursch
27	MF	AUT	Stefan Haudum
28	DF	AUT	Marcel Schantl
29	FW	GER	Mehmet Ibrahimi
30	MF	AUT	Kristijan Dobras
31	GK	AUT	Kevin Radulovic

== Transfers ==
=== In ===
Pos.	Player	Transferred from	Fee	Date	Source

=== Out ===
Pos.	Player	Transferred to	Fee	Date	Source

== Pre-season and friendlies ==
Win Draw Loss Fixtures

== Competitions ==
=== Overview ===
Competition	First match	Last match	Starting round	Record							
Competition	First match	Last match	Starting round	Pld	W	D	L	GF	GA	GD	Win %
Austrian Football Bundesliga	July 2023	May 2024	Matchday 1	0	0	0	0	0	0	+0	—
Austrian Cup	21 July 2023		First round	0	0	0	0	0	0	+0	—
Total				0	0	0	0	0	0	+0	—

Last updated: 9 December 2023
Source: Soccerway

=== Austrian Football Bundesliga ===
==== League table ====
Pos	Team	Pld	W	D	L	GF	GA	GD	Pts	Qualification
8	Wolfsberger AC	22	8	6	8	29	32	−3	30	Qualification for the Relegation round
9	SCR Altach	22	4	7	11	17	30	−13	19	Qualification for the Relegation round
10	Blau-Weiß Linz	22	4	7	11	22	38	−16	19	Qualification for the Relegation round
11	WSG Tirol	22	4	2	16	20	42	−22	14	Qualification for the Relegation round
12	Austria Lustenau	22	2	4	16	13	49	−36	10	Qualification for the Relegation round

Source: Austrian Football Bundesliga
Rules for classification: 1) Points; 2) Head-to-head record; 3) Goal difference; 4) Goals scored; 5) Matches won; 6) Away matches won; 7) Away goals scored.

Pos	Team	Pld	W	D	L	GF	GA	GD	Pts	Qualification	STU	RBS	LASK	RWI	HAR	AKL
1	Sturm Graz (C)	32	19	10	3	56	23	+33	44	Qualification for the Champions League league stage	—	0–1	1–0	1–0	1–1	2–0
2	Red Bull Salzburg	32	20	7	5	74	29	+45	42	Qualification for the Champions League third qualifying round (Note: Since the Europa League winners, Atalanta qualified for the Champions League via league position, Red Bull Salzburg were promoted from the Champions League second qualifying round to the third qualifying round as one of the two teams with the highest coefficient in the second qualifying round.)	2–2	—	7–1	1–1	5–1	4–2
3	LASK	32	14	10	8	43	33	+10	34	Qualification for the Europa League play-off round (Note: The 2023–24 Austrian Cup winners qualified for the Europa League play-off round. Since the cup winners (Sturm Graz) qualified based on league position, the Europa League spot was passed to the third-placed team.)	2–2	3–1	—	5–0	1–3	1–0
4	Rapid Wien	32	11	12	9	47	35	+12	28	Qualification for the Europa League second qualifying round	1–3	2–0	0–0	—	0–3	1–1
5	Hartberg	32	12	9	11	49	52	−3	28	Qualification for the Conference League play-offs	1–3	1–5	1–2	0–3	—	3–2
6	Austria Klagenfurt	32	9	12	11	40	50	−10	22		0–4	4–3	0–2	0–1	2–2	—

Source: Austrian Football Bundesliga
Legend: Blue = home team win; Yellow = draw; Red = away team win.
Rules for classification: 1) Points; 2) Points with (possible) half points subtracted due to rounding; 3) Head-to-head points; 4) Head-to-head goal difference; 5) Head-to-head goals scored; 6) Goal difference; 7) Goals scored; 8) Matches won; 9) Away matches won; 10) Away goals scored.
(C) Champions
Notes:

Pos	Team	Pld	W	D	L	GF	GA	GD	Pts	Qualification	WOL	AWI	BWL	ALT	WAT	LUS
1	Wolfsberger AC	32	12	10	10	41	39	+2	31	Qualification for the Conference League play-offs	—	0–1	0–2	0–0	3–1	1–1
2	Austria Wien (O)	32	12	10	10	35	34	+1	29	Qualification for the Conference League play-offs	0–4	—	0–0	2–2	3–0	1–1
3	Blau-Weiß Linz	32	7	11	14	33	48	−15	22		0–0	1–2	—	2–1	3–2	0–0
4	Rheindorf Altach	32	6	13	13	27	40	−13	21		0–1	1–1	2–2	—	0–0	2–2
5	WSG Tirol	32	7	5	20	29	55	−26	19		1–1	1–0	2–1	0–1	—	0–0
6	Austria Lustenau (R)	32	4	9	19	22	58	−36	16	Relegation to Austrian Football Second League	1–2	2–0	1–0	0–1	1–2	—

Legend: Blue = home team win; Yellow = draw; Red = away team win.
Rules for classification: 1) Points; 2) Points with (possible) half points subtracted due to rounding; 3) Head-to-head points; 4) Head-to-head goal difference; 5) Head-to-head goals scored; 6) Head-to-head away goals scored; 7) Goal difference; 8) Goals scored; 9) Matches won; 10) Away matches won; 11) Away goals scored.
(O) Play-off winners; (R) Relegated

==== Results summary ====
Overall								Home						Away					
Pld	W	D	L	GF	GA	GD	Pts	W	D	L	GF	GA	GD	W	D	L	GF	GA	GD
0	0	0	0	0	0	0	0	0	0	0	0	0	0	0	0	0	0	0	0

Last updated: November 2023.

==== Results by round ====
Round	1
Ground	
Result	
Position	

Updated to match(es) played on November 2023. Source:
A = Away; H = Home; W = Win; D = Draw; L = Loss

==== Matches ====
The league fixtures were unveiled on 27 June 2023.

July 2023 1	v

=== Austrian Cup ===
The draw for the season's first round took place on 25 June.

21 July 2023 First round	SPG Wallern/St. Marienkirchen	v	Blau-Weiß Linz
