= Karl Kiesenebner =

Austrian footballer

Personal information
- Date of birth: 8 December 1950

Senior career*
Years	Team	Apps	(Gls)
1969–1979	LASK		
1980–1983	FC Union Wels		

Managerial career
- 1994–1995: FC Blau-Weiß Linz (assistant)
- 1995: FC Blau-Weiß Linz
- 1995: FC Blau-Weiß Linz (assistant)
- * Club domestic league appearances and goals

Karl Kiesenebner (born 8 December 1950) is an Austrian football defender.
