= Ronivaldo (footballer) =

Brazilian footballer

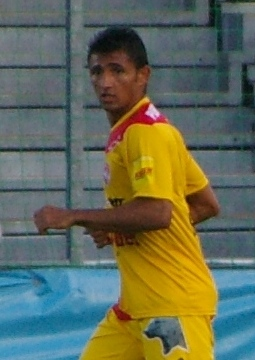
- Ronivaldo in 2014

Personal information
- Full name: Ronivaldo Bernardo Sales
- Date of birth: 24 March 1989 (age 37)
- Place of birth: Orós, Brazil
- Height: 1.73 m (5 ft 8 in)
- Position: Forward

Team information
- Current team: Blau-Weiß Linz
- Number: 9

Youth career
- Náutico
- Palmeiras

Senior career*
Years	Team	Apps	(Gls)
2009	CAL Bariri		
2010	Taubaté		
2010–2012	Arapongas	16	(4)
2012	Taubaté	17	(4)
2012	→ Osasco (loan)	6	(4)
2012–2015	Kapfenberger SV	49	(22)
2015–2017	Austria Wien	0	(0)
2017	Austria Wien II	8	(1)
2017–2020	Austria Lustenau	78	(62)
2020–2022	Wacker Innsbruck	59	(34)
2022–	Blau-Weiß Linz	120	(52)
- * Club domestic league appearances and goals as of 10 June 2026

Ronivaldo Bernardo Sales (born 24 March 1989) is a Brazilian professional footballer who plays as a forward for Austrian Bundesliga club, Blau-Weiß Linz. Previously, he has played for Austria Lustenau, Kapfenberger SV, Arapongas, and lastly Taubate. Besides Brazil, he has played in Austria.

== Club career ==
On 29 October 2014, Ronivaldo scored a hat-trick in Kapfenberger SV's 8–3 win against LASK Linz. He scored another hat-trick against Floridsdorfer AC on 12 September 2017.

Ronivaldo transferred to Austria Wien in the summer of 2015.

On 10 July 2020, he signed with Wacker Innsbruck.

Ronivaldo joined Blau-Weiß Linz on 30 May 2022, signing a two-year contract.

== Personal life ==
Ronivaldo played in his home country under the stage name Val Ceará. In February 2024, Brazilian born player received Austrian citizenship after eleven years as a player in Austria.

== Career statistics ==
=== Club ===
As of match played 20 April 2025.

Appearances and goals by club, season and competition
Club	Season	League			Austrian Cup		Total	
Club	Season	Division	Apps	Goals	Apps	Goals	Apps	Goals
Kapfenberger SV	2012–13	Austrian Football First League	16	3	0	0	16	3
Kapfenberger SV	2013–14	Austrian Football First League	15	9	3	0	18	9
Kapfenberger SV	2014–15	Austrian Football First League	18	10	3	5	21	15
Kapfenberger SV	Total		49	22	6	5	55	27
Austria Lustenau	2017–18	Austrian Football First League	20	12	1	0	21	12
Austria Lustenau	2018–19	Austrian Football Second League	30	26	3	3	33	29
Austria Lustenau	2019–20	Austrian Football Second League	28	24	5	7	33	31
Austria Lustenau	Total		78	62	9	10	87	72
Wacker Innsbruck	2020–21	Austrian Football Second League	30	13	2	0	32	13
Wacker Innsbruck	2021–22	Austrian Football Second League	29	21	2	1	31	22
Wacker Innsbruck	Total		59	34	4	1	63	35
Blau-Weiß Linz	2022–23	Austrian Football Second League	30	19	3	2	33	21
Blau-Weiß Linz	2023–24	Austrian Bundesliga	29	10	3	2	32	12
Blau-Weiß Linz	2024–25	Austrian Bundesliga	25	13	3	2	28	15
Blau-Weiß Linz	Total		84	42	9	6	93	48
Career total			270	160	28	22	298	182

== Honours ==
Blau-Weiß Linz

- Austrian Second League: 2022–23

Individual

- Austria Lustenau Player of the Season: 2018–19, 2019–20
- Austrian Bundesliga top scorer: 2024–25
- Austrian Second League top scorer: 2018–19, 2019–20, 2022–23
- Austrian Cup top scorer: 2019–20
