= Gerald Perzy =

Austrian footballer and manager

Personal information
- Date of birth: 14 August 1967 (age 59)
- Place of birth: Austria
- Position: Midfielder

Senior career*
Years	Team	Apps	(Gls)
–1990	SK Amateure Steyr		
1990–1992	LASK Linz		
1993–1995	SV Traun		
1995–1997	SV Gmunden		
1997–2000	FC Blau-Weiß Linz		

Managerial career
- 2003: FC Blau-Weiß Linz (Interim manager)
- 2004: FC Blau-Weiß Linz (Interim manager)
- 2005: FC Blau-Weiß Linz (Interim manager)
- 2006-2007: ASKÖ Perg
- 2007–2013: FC Blau-Weiß Linz (Sporting director)
- 2008: FC Blau-Weiß Linz (Interim manager)
- 2011: FC Blau-Weiß Linz (Interim manager)
- 2012: FC Blau-Weiß Linz (Interim manager)
- 2013: Union Perg
- 2014–: SK Vorwärts Steyr
- * Club domestic league appearances and goals

Gerald Perzy (born 14 August 1967) is an Austrian football manager and former player. He has stepped in as interim coach at FC Blau-Weiß Linz on 6 separate occasions.
