= Simon Seidl =

Austrian footballer

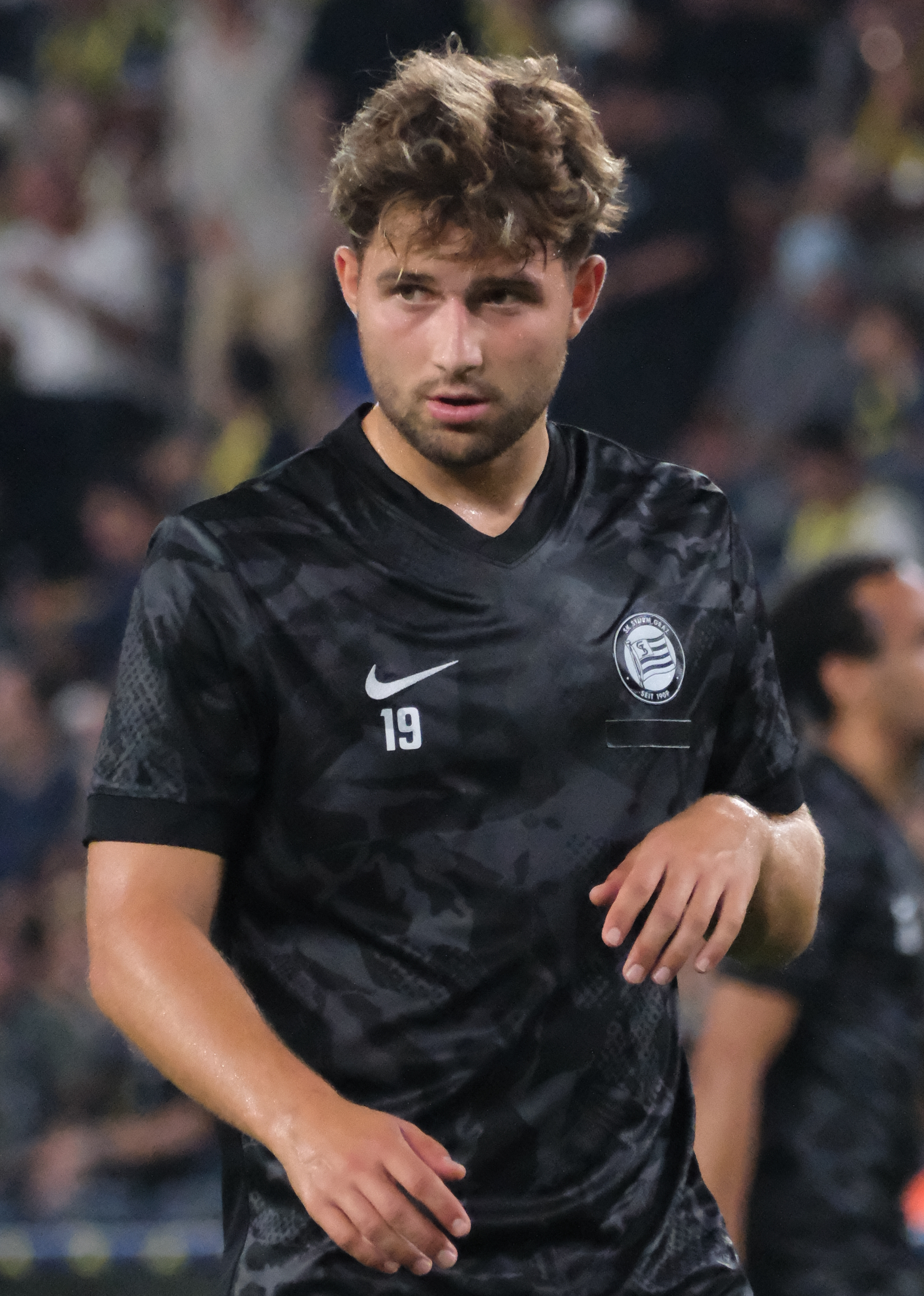
- Seidl in 2026

Personal information
- Date of birth: September 4, 2002 (age 24)
- Place of birth: Kuchl, Austria
- Height: 1.83 m (6 ft 0 in)
- Position: Midfielder

Team information
- Current team: Sturm Graz
- Number: 19

Youth career
- 2009–2016: SV Kuchl
- 2016–2018: SV Grödig

Senior career*
| Years | Team | Apps | (Gls) |
| 2018–2022 | Kuchl II | 43 | (22) |
| 2018–2022 | Kuchl | 44 | (6) |
| 2022–2026 | Blau-Weiß Linz | 99 | (17) |
| 2026– | Sturm Graz | 10 | (1) |

International career
| 2023–2024 | Austria U21 | 9 | (2) |
- * Club domestic league appearances and goals as of 19:24, 25 October 2026 (UTC)

Simon Seidl (born 4 September 2002) is an Austrian footballer who plays as a midfielder for the Austrian Football Bundesliga club Sturm Graz.

== Club career ==
Seidl began his career at SV Kuchl before moving to SV Grödig for the 2016–17 season. He returned to Kuchl ahead of the 2018–19 season, initially playing for the club's reserve team before making his first-team debut in the Salzburger Liga in 2018. On 29 July 2022, he transferred to FC Blau-Weiß Linz on a 2+1 year contract. Blau-Weiß Linz won the 2. Liga title in June 2023, earning promotion to the Austrian Bundesliga for the first time in the club's history. On 28 May 2026, he transferred to Sturm Graz.

== International career ==
Seidl has represented Austria at under-21 level since 2023.

== Personal life ==
Seidl is the brother of fellow footballer Matthias Seidl.

== Career statistics ==
As of match played 29 October 2026

Appearances and goals by club, season and competition
| Club | Season | League | | | Cup | | Europe | | Other | | Total | |
| Club | Season | Division | Apps | Goals | Apps | Goals | Apps | Goals | Apps | Goals | Apps | Goals |
|---|---|---|---|---|---|---|---|---|---|---|---|---|
| Kuchl II | 2018–19 | 1. Klasse Nord | 24 | 12 | — | | — | | — | | 24 | 12 |
| Kuchl II | 2019–20 | Austrian 2. Landesliga | 19 | 10 | — | | — | | — | | 19 | 10 |
| Kuchl II | Total | | 43 | 22 | — | | — | | — | | 43 | 22 |
| Kuchl | 2019–20 | Regionalliga Salzburg | 7 | 0 | — | | — | | — | | 7 | 0 |
| Kuchl | 2020–21 | Regionalliga Salzburg | 8 | 0 | — | | — | | — | | 8 | 0 |
| Kuchl | 2021–22 | Regionalliga Salzburg | 29 | 6 | 1 | 0 | — | | — | | 30 | 6 |
| Kuchl | Total | | 44 | 6 | 1 | 0 | — | | — | | 44 | 6 |
| Blau-Weiß Linz | 2022–23 | 2. Liga | 17 | 1 | 1 | 0 | — | | — | | 18 | 1 |
| Blau-Weiß Linz | 2023–24 | Austrian Bundesliga | 22 | 4 | 1 | 0 | — | | — | | 23 | 4 |
| Blau-Weiß Linz | 2024–25 | Austrian Bundesliga | 31 | 4 | 3 | 0 | — | | — | | 34 | 4 |
| Blau-Weiß Linz | 2025–26 | Austrian Bundesliga | 29 | 8 | 4 | 1 | — | | — | | 33 | 9 |
| Blau-Weiß Linz | Total | | 99 | 17 | 9 | 1 | — | | — | | 108 | 18 |
| Sturm Graz | 2026–27 | Austrian Bundesliga | 10 | 1 | 3 | 3 | 7 (Note: Four appearances and one goal in UEFA Champions League, three appearances in UEFA Europa League) | 1 | — | | 20 | 5 |
| Career total | | | 196 | 40 | 13 | 4 | 7 | 1 | 0 | 0 | 216 | 45 |

== Honours ==
Blau-Weiß Linz

- Austria 2. Liga: 2022–23
