= Adam Kensy =

Polish footballer (born 1956)

Personal information
- Date of birth: 18 November 1956 (age 69)
- Place of birth: Białośliwie, Poland
- Height: 1.76 m (5 ft 9 in)
- Position: Midfielder

Team information
- Current team: SC Marchtrenk (manager)

Senior career*
Years	Team	Apps	(Gls)
- Zachem Bydgoszcz
1975–1979	Pogoń Szczecin	112	(15)
1979–1981	Zawisza Bydgoszcz		
1981–1986	Pogoń Szczecin	133	(20)
1987–1990	LASK	56	(5)
2007	Pogoń Szczecin Nowa		

International career
1983	Poland	3	(0)

Managerial career
- 1989: LASK (caretaker)
- 1998: LASK (caretaker)
- 1998–2003: Blau-Weiß Linz
- 2003–2006: St. Magdalena
- 2006–2008: Wels
- 2008–2011: Blau-Weiß Linz
- 2012: Union Perg
- 2012–2013: Vorwärts Steyr
- 2013–2014: Hertha Wels
- 2016: Hertha Wels (caretaker)
- 2017–2018: SC Marchtrenk
- 2018: SV Gallneukirchen
- 2020–: SC Marchtrenk
- * Club domestic league appearances and goals

Adam Kensy (born 18 November 1956) is a Polish football manager and former player who played as a midfielder. He is the manager of Austrian club SC Marchtrenk.

He earned three caps for the Poland national team in 1983.
