= Michael Köllner =

German football manager (born 1969)

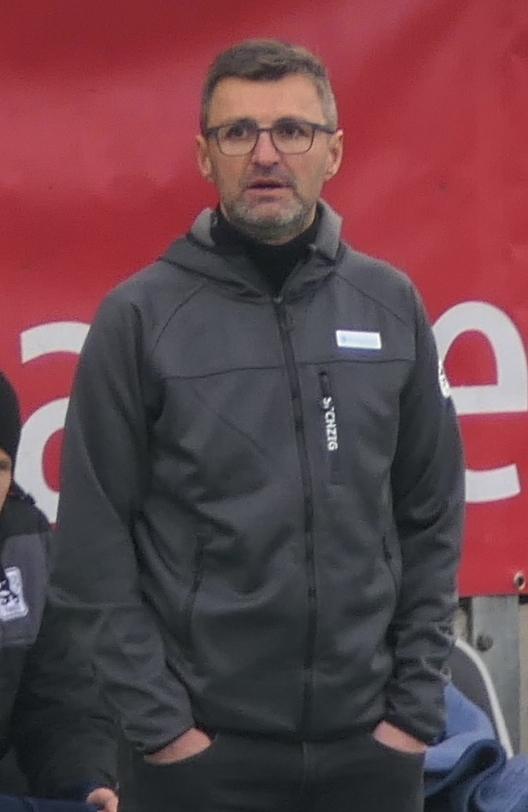
- Köllner in 2020

Personal information
- Date of birth: 29 December 1969 (age 56)
- Place of birth: Fuchsmühl, West Germany

Managerial career
- Years: Team
- 2000–2001: Bayern Hof
- 2016–2017: 1. FC Nürnberg II
- 2017–2019: 1. FC Nürnberg
- 2019–2023: 1860 Munich
- 2023–2024: FC Ingolstadt
- 2026–: Blau-Weiß Linz

Michael Köllner (German pronunciation: [ˈkœlnɐ]; born 29 December 1969) is a German professional football manager who is the current head coach of Austrian Bundesliga side FC Blau-Weiß Linz.

== Career ==
Köllner coached 1. FC Nürnberg II before being promoted to first team manager in May 2017. He was sacked on 12 February 2019. He signed for 1860 Munich on 9 November 2019. He was sacked in January 2023. In April 2023, he became the new manager of FC Ingolstadt. In May 2024, he was sacked.

On 21 December 2025 he joined struggling Austrian Bundesliga club FC Blau-Weiß Linz. He joins them on an 18 month contract with an option to automatically extend by a further year if the team avoids relegation. At the time of his appointment, Linz sit in last place in the 2025–26 Bundesliga.

== Managerial record ==
As of 28 April 2024

Team	From	To	Record					Ref.
Team	From	To	G	W	D	L	Win %	Ref.
1. FC Nürnberg II	1 July 2016	7 March 2017	22	10	5	7	45.45	
1. FC Nürnberg	7 March 2017	12 February 2019	72	26	17	29	36.11	
1860 Munich	9 November 2019	31 January 2023	133	66	32	35	49.62	
FC Ingolstadt 04	6 April 2023	2 May 2024	51	23	11	17	45.10	
FC Blau-Weiß Linz	1 January 2026	present	0	0	0	0	—	
Total			278	125	65	88	44.96	—
