= 1964–65 Austrian football championship =

47th season of top-tier football league in Austria

Austrian Staatsliga
- Season: 1964–65
- Champions: Linzer ASK

Statistics of Austrian Staatsliga in the 1964–65 season.

== Overview ==
It was contested by 14 teams, and Linzer ASK won the championship.

== League standings ==
Pos	Team	Pld	W	D	L	GF	GA	GD	Pts
1	Linzer ASK	26	14	8	4	49	29	+20	36
2	SK Rapid Wien	26	14	7	5	42	21	+21	35
3	SK Admira Wien Energie	26	14	7	5	52	28	+24	35
4	Wiener Sportclub	26	15	3	8	54	36	+18	33
5	First Vienna FC	26	12	6	8	51	36	+15	30
6	1. Schwechater SC	26	10	9	7	27	28	−1	29
7	FK Austria Wien	26	9	10	7	29	28	+1	28
8	FC Wacker Innsbruck	26	8	10	8	29	23	+6	26
9	1. Wiener Neustädter SC	26	8	7	11	31	32	−1	23
10	Grazer AK	26	6	8	12	28	48	−20	20
11	Kapfenberger SV	26	5	10	11	25	45	−20	20
12	SK Sturm Graz	26	7	5	14	29	40	−11	19
13	Wiener AC	26	5	5	16	31	54	−23	15
14	SC Wacker	26	4	7	15	27	56	−29	15

Source: rsssf.com

== Results ==
Home \ Away	ADM	AUS	FIR	GAK	KAP	LIN	RWI	SCH	STU	WIN	WAK	WAC	WNE	WIE
Admira Wien Energie		1–1	1–1	0–1	2–2	1–1	2–0	1–0	4–1	1–1	1–1	4–1	4–2	2–3
Austria Wien	0–3		2–5	2–0	4–1	0–2	3–1	0–0	1–0	0–0	3–0	2–1	0–1	3–1
First Vienna	3–1	1–1		4–0	5–2	0–2	1–4	5–1	2–0	1–3	1–2	4–1	3–1	2–0
Grazer AK	0–2	1–1	3–1		2–2	0–4	1–0	2–2	0–2	0–0	2–2	0–1	0–0	2–3
Kapfenberger SV	0–3	1–2	2–2	1–1		1–1	0–2	2–0	0–0	0–0	0–2	0–2	2–1	2–0
Linzer ASK	1–4	0–0	0–0	0–4	3–1		1–1	3–0	1–2	1–0	3–0	2–1	2–4	1–1
Rapid Wien	1–1	1–0	3–1	5–0	5–2	1–1		1–1	3–0	0–1	1–1	1–1	2–0	1–0
1. Schwechater SC	1–0	0–0	1–3	1–0	0–0	1–2	2–0		1–0	0–0	2–0	2–1	0–0	1–2
Sturm Graz	1–3	0–0	1–0	2–3	3–0	1–2	0–0	1–1		2–1	3–1	0–2	0–0	0–1
Wacker Innsbruck	0–1	4–0	1–0	2–0	0–0	2–2	0–1	2–3	1–0		2–0	0–0	2–0	0–2
Wacker Wien	1–1	0–3	2–1	2–2	2–0	0–3	1–1	0–2	1–3	0–2		1–4	0–0	1–2
Wiener AC	1–3	1–3	1–2	2–1	0–0	1–3	1–4	1–2	2–4	3–3	4–1		1–3	1–4
Wiener Neustädter SC	0–1	2–0	1–1	2–2	0–1	1–3	0–1	1–2	3–1	3–2	0–0	0–0		2–0
Wiener SC	4–3	1–1	1–2	5–0	4–1	1–2	0–1	1–1	4–2	3–2	2–1	2–1	2–1	

Legend: Blue = home team win; Yellow = draw; Red = away team win.
