= Dieter Mirnegg =

Austrian footballer

Personal information
- Full name: Hans-Dieter Mirnegg
- Date of birth: 24 May 1954 (age 72)
- Place of birth: Klagenfurt, Austria
- Height: 1.77 m (5 ft 9 1/2 in)
- Position: Defender

Senior career*
Years	Team	Apps	(Gls)
1972–1975	Austria Klagenfurt		
1975–1979	SK VÖEST Linz		
1979–1981	MSV Duisburg	48	(1)
1981–1982	Calcio Como	11	(0)
1982–1984	FC Union Wels		
1983–1984	SK VÖEST Linz		
1984–1985	Wiener Sport-Club		
1985–1987	SK Vorwärts Steyr		
1987–1988	Union Vöcklamarkt		
1988–1990	SK Amateure Steyr		
1992–1995	SV Austria Tabak Linz		

International career
1979–1981	Austria	15	(0)

Managerial career
- 1990–1991: SV Austria Tabak Linz
- 1992: Stahl Linz
- 1995–1996: SV Austria Tabak Linz
- 1996–1997: ATSV Lenzing
- 1997–1998: SV Grieskirchen
- 1998–2001: ASKÖ Donau Linz
- 2001–2002: LASK Linz
- 2004–2005: FC Blau-Weiß Linz
- * Club domestic league appearances and goals

Dieter Mirnegg (born 24 May 1954) is an Austrian retired footballer and coach.
