= Erwin Spiegel =

Austrian football manager (born 1956)

Personal information
- Date of birth: 3 October 1956 (age 70)
- Position: Defender

Senior career*
Years	Team	Apps	(Gls)
1974–1978	LASK		

Managerial career
- 1990: SK St. Magdalena
- 1990: LASK
- 1999: LASK (assistant)
- 1990–1991: LASK
- 1993–1995: ASKÖ Donau Linz
- 1999–2002: Union St. Florian
- 2003–200: SV Grieskirchen
- 2006–2007: SKU Amstetten
- 2007–2008: FC Blau-Weiß Linz
- 2011: FC Pasching
- * Club domestic league appearances and goals

Erwin Spiegel (born 3 October 1956) is an Austrian football manager and former player.
