= 1962–63 Austrian Cup =

Tournament details
- Country: Austria

Final positions
- Champions: Austria Wien
- Runners-up: Linzer ASK

The 1962–63 Austrian Cup (German: ÖFB-Cup) was the 29th season of Austria's nationwide football cup competition. The final was held at the Praterstadion, Vienna on 19 June 1963.

The competition was won by Austria Wien after beating Linzer ASK 1–0.

== Round of 32 ==
| Team 1 | Score | Team 2 |
|---|---|---|
9 December 1962
| SK Bischofshofen | 3–2 (a.e.t.) | FC Dornbirn |
22 December 1962
| 1. Schwechater SC | 0–1 | FS Elektra Wien |
30 December 1962
| Wiener Sport-Club | 2–1 | 1. Wiener Neustädter SC |
12 January 1963
| SK Sturm Graz | 7–2 | Slovan-Olympia Wien |
13 January 1963
| SV Mattersburg | 2–0 | SV Hall |
2 February 1963
| SV Austria Salzburg | 0–0 | SV Wattens |
3 February 1963
| VfB Hohenems | 1–16 | FK Austria Wien |
| Wiener AC | 2–1 | Grazer AK |
9 February 1963
| 1. Simmeringer SC | 2–1 | WFC Semperit Wien |
16 February 1963
| Admira-Energie Wien | 2–2 (a.e.t.) | SVS Linz |
| Polizei SV Linz | 1–3 | Linzer ASK |
17 February 1963
| SC Herzogenburg | 0–0 | ESV Admira Villach |
| Wacker Wien | 0–3 | First Vienna FC |
| Austria Klagenfurt | 1–1 (a.e.t.) | SK Rapid Wien |
2 March 1963
| FC Trofaiach | 0–0 | SAK 1914 |
| Kapfenberger SV | 1–0 | Grazer SC |
Replay: 23 February 1963
| SVS Linz | 4–6 (a.e.t.) | Admira-Energie Wien |
Replay: 10 March 1963
| SK Rapid Wien | 2–1 | Austria Klagenfurt |

== Round of 16 ==
| Team 1 | Score | Team 2 |
|---|---|---|
16 February 1963
| SK Sturm Graz | 1–2 | 1. Simmeringer SC |
17 February 1963
| SK Bischofshofen | 1–5 | Wiener Sport-Club |
24 February 1963
| ESV Admira Villach | 1–2 | FS Elektra Wien |
9 March 1963
| Kapfenberger SV | 2–0 | Wiener AC |
10 March 1963
| SV Mattersburg | 4–1 | FC Trofaiach |
13 March 1963
| SV Austria Salzburg | 1–3 | Linzer ASK |
27 March 1963
| Admira-Energie Wien | 4–5 | FK Austria Wien |
| First Vienna FC | 2–5 | SK Rapid Wien |

== Quarter-finals ==
| Team 1 | Score | Team 2 |
|---|---|---|
10 April 1963
| 1. Simmeringer SC | 0–1 (a.e.t.) | Wiener Sport-Club |
| FK Austria Wien | 1–0 | SK Rapid Wien |
| Linzer ASK | 4–2 | SV Mattersburg |
13 April 1963
| Kapfenberger SV | 2–1 | FS Elektra Wien |

== Semi-finals ==
| Team 1 | Score | Team 2 |
|---|---|---|
15 May 1963
| Kapfenberger SV | 2–3 | Linzer ASK |
| Wiener Sport-Club | 1–2 | FK Austria Wien |

== Final ==
19 June 1963
19:00

| FK Austria Wien | 1–0 | Linzer ASK |
|---|---|---|
| Jacare 14' | Report |

Praterstadion, Vienna
Attendance: 10,000
Referee: Alfred Eisenkölb
