= Julian Gölles =

Austrian footballer

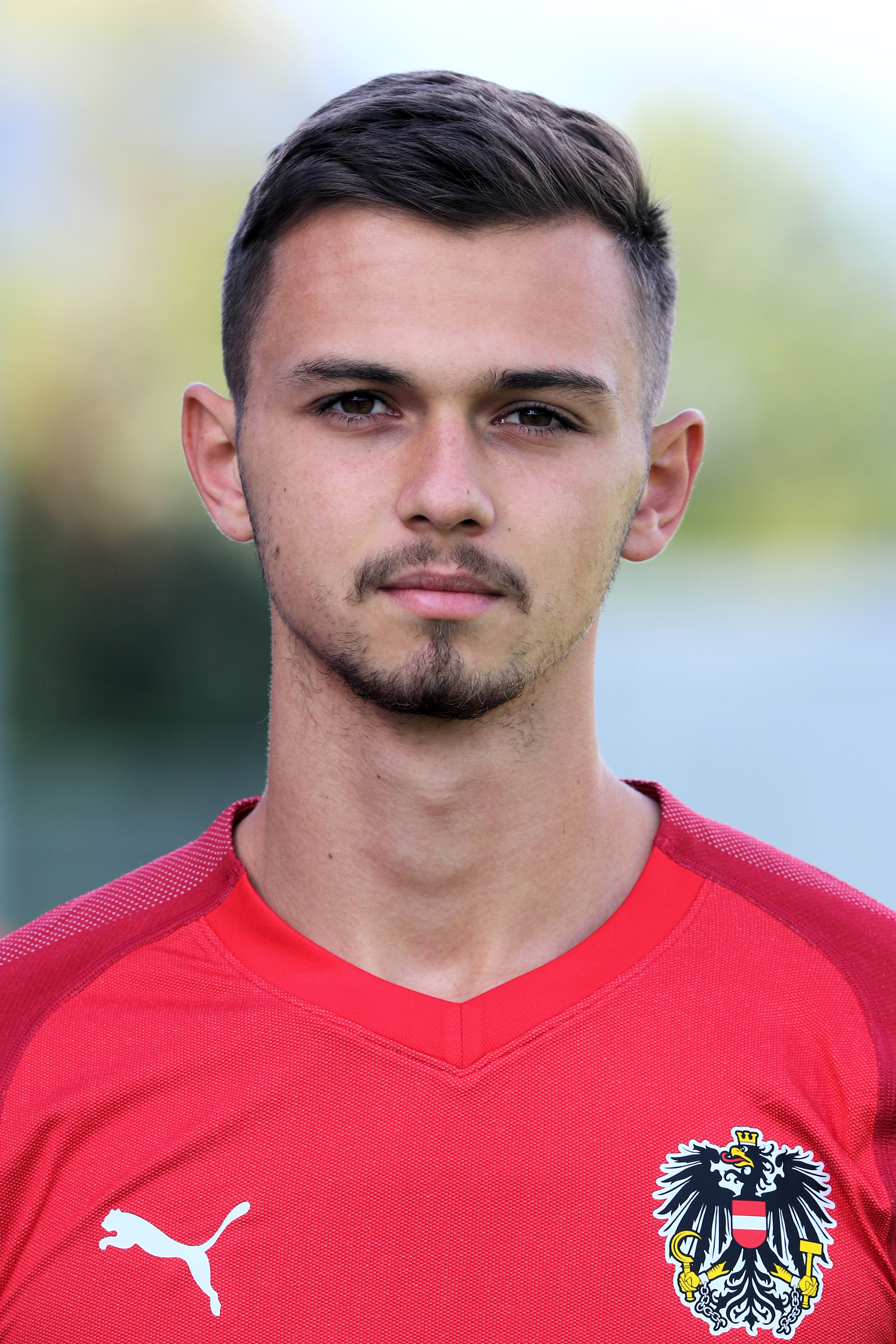

Personal information
- Full name: Julian Peter Gölles
- Date of birth: 22 September 1999 (age 27)
- Place of birth: Austria
- Height: 1.88 m (6 ft 2 in)
- Position: Defender

Team information
- Current team: TSV Hartberg
- Number: 16

Youth career
- Red Bull Salzburg

Senior career*
| Years | Team | Apps | (Gls) |
| 2017–2018 | FC Liefering | 23 | (0) |
| 2018–2019 | Wiener Neustadt | 19 | (2) |
| 2019–2021 | WSG Tirol | 24 | (0) |
| 2021–2025 | Blau-Weiß Linz | 76 | (5) |
| 2025– | TSV Hartberg | 8 | (0) |

International career^{‡}
| 2014 | Austria U16 | 5 | (0) |
| 2018 | Austria U19 | 1 | (0) |
| 2019 | Austria U21 | 3 | (0) |
- * Club domestic league appearances and goals as of 10 June 2026 ‡ National team caps and goals as of 18 November 2019

Julian Gölles (born 22 September 1999) is an Austrian professional footballer who plays as a defender for Austrian Bundesliga club TSV Hartberg.

== Club career ==
On 23 June 2021, he joined Blau-Weiß Linz on a two-year contract.

On 4 July 2025, he joined Austrian Bundesliga club TSV Hartberg for the 2025–26 season.
