= Fabian Windhager =

Austrian footballer

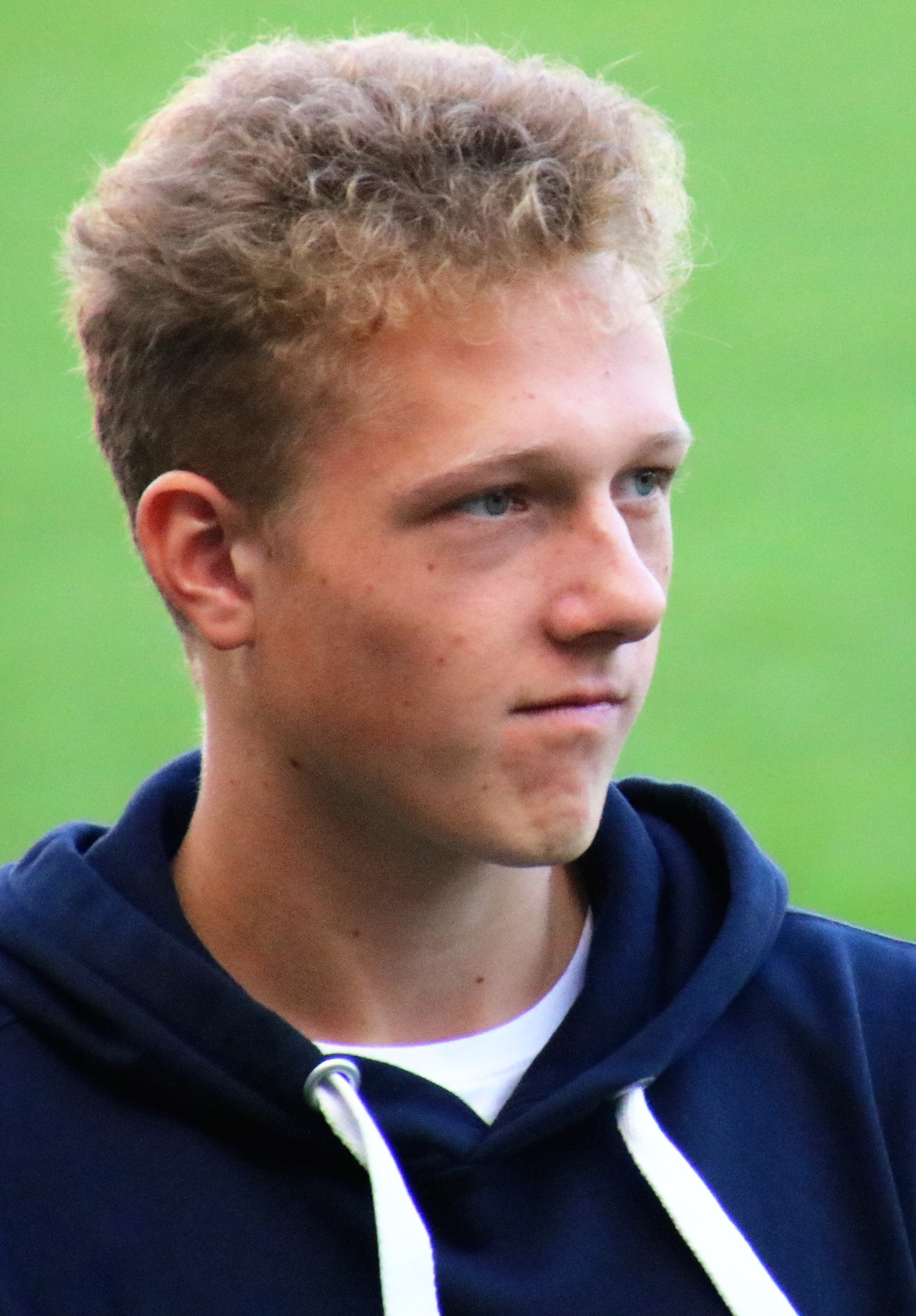
- Windhager in September 2018

Personal information
- Date of birth: 7 September 2001 (age 25)
- Place of birth: Austria
- Height: 1.72 m (5 ft 7 1/2 in)
- Position: Defender

Team information
- Current team: Austria Salzburg
- Number: 22

Youth career
- Red Bull Salzburg

Senior career*
Years	Team	Apps	(Gls)
2018–2021	FC Liefering	5	(0)
2020–2021	→ USK Anif (loan)	9	(1)
2021–2024	Blau-Weiß Linz	53	(3)
2024–	Austria Salzburg	19	(0)

International career^{‡}
2016	Austria U-15	7	(0)
2020	Austria U-19	1	(0)
- * Club domestic league appearances and goals as of 15 October 2025 ‡ National team caps and goals as of 4 March 2020

Fabian Windhager (born 7 September 2001) is an Austrian professional footballer who plays as a defender for Austrian 2. Liga club Austria Salzburg.
