= Marco Krainz =

Austrian footballer

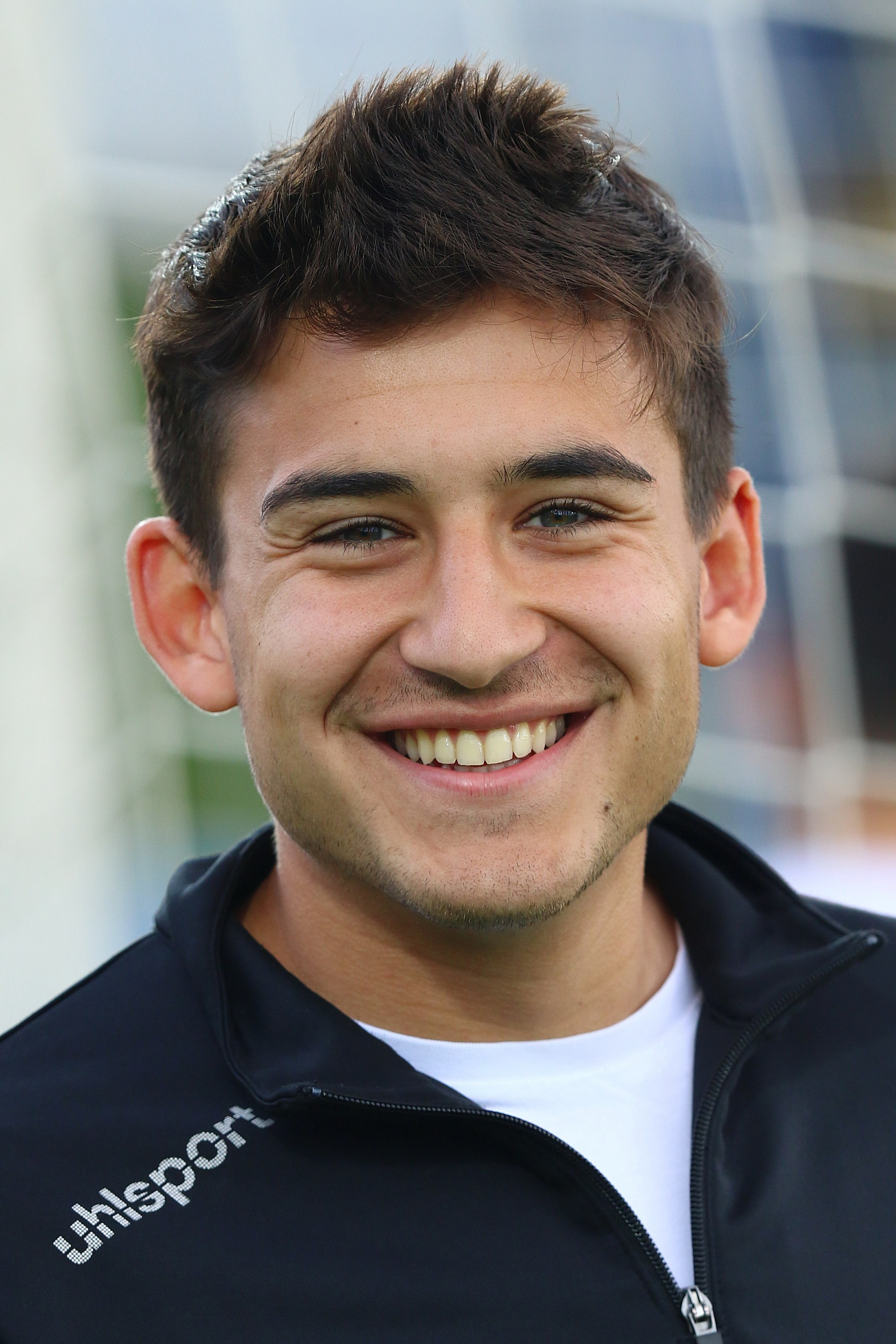
- Krainz with Austria Lustenau in 2018

Personal information
- Date of birth: 17 May 1997 (age 29)
- Place of birth: Vienna, Austria
- Height: 1.79 m (5 ft 10 in)
- Position: Midfielder

Team information
- Current team: Iraklis
- Number: 27

Youth career
- –2014: Austria Wien

Senior career*
Years	Team	Apps	(Gls)
2014–2015	Austria Wien II	0	(0)
2015–2020	Austria Lustenau	102	(5)
2020–2022	Floridsdorfer AC	65	(7)
2022–2024	Blau-Weiß Linz	48	(0)
2024–2026	Enosis Neon Paralimni	44	(0)
2026–	Iraklis	13	(1)

International career
2012–2013	Austria U16	11	(0)
2013–2014	Austria U17	9	(0)
2015	Austria U18	4	(0)
2015–2016	Austria U19	10	(1)
2017–2018	Austria U21	2	(0)
- * Club domestic league appearances and goals as of 13 October 2026

Marco Krainz (born 17 May 1997) is an Austrian professional footballer who plays as a midfielder for Super League Greece club Iraklis. He has represented Austria at various youth levels, captaining the Austria U19 team.
