= 2022–23 Austrian Football Second League =

48th season of the Austrian second-level football league

Austrian Football Second League
- Season: 2022–23
- Dates: 22 July 2022 – 4 June 2023
- Champions: Blau-Weiß Linz
- Promoted: Blau-Weiß Linz
- Relegated: Vorwärts Steyr; Rapid Wien II; Austria Wien II
- Matches: 240
- Goals: 695 (2.9 per match)
- Top goalscorer: Ronivaldo (19)
- Biggest home win: St. Pölten 5–0 Austria Wien II (28 Oct 2022); FC Liefering 6–1 Rapid Wien II 21 Oct 2022); Liefering 5–0 Austria Wien II (4 June 2023)
- Biggest away win: Liefering 0–6 Dornbirn (18 Sept 2022)
- Highest scoring: Admira 4–3 Grazer AK (29 July 2022); St. Pölten 2–5 Sturm Graz II (12 Aug 2022); Dornbirn 2–5 Blau-Weiß Linz (7 Oct 2022); Liefering 6–1 Rapid Wien II 21 Oct 2022)
- Longest winning run: Blau-Weiß Linz (8 matches)
- Longest unbeaten run: Blau-Weiß Linz; Kapfenberger SV (10 matches)
- Longest winless run: Kapfenberger SV (13 matches)
- Longest losing run: Liefering; Kapfenberger SV; Admira; Austria Wien II; Lafnitz (5 matches)

The 2022–23 Austrian Football Second League known as the Admiral 2nd League for sponsorship purposes, was the 49th season of the Austrian second-level football league and the fifth as the Second League. The league consists of 16 teams.

Blau-Weiß Linz secured the league championship and promotion to the 2023–24 Austrian Football Bundesliga on the last day of the season, notching a win over Sturm Graz II while second place Grazer AK was only able to secure a draw.

== Teams ==
Sixteen teams will participate in the 2022–23 season. FC Flyeralarm Admira was relegated from the 2021–22 Austrian Football Bundesliga, replacing the 2021–22 champions SC Austria Lustenau, while First Vienna FC (Regionalliga Ost) and SK Sturm Graz II (Regionalliga Mitte) were promoted from the third tier to replace the two relegated squads, FC Juniors OÖ and FC Wacker Innsbruck.

Location of teams in the 2022–23 Austrian Football Second League

Club Name	City	Stadium	Capacity
Admira Wacker	Maria Enzersdorf	motion invest Arena	10,600
SKU Amstetten	Amstetten	Ertl Glas Stadion	2,000
Austria Wien II	Vienna	Generali-Arena	17,500
Blau-Weiß Linz	Linz	Donauparkstadion	2,000
FC Dornbirn	Dornbirn	Stadion Birkenwiese	7,500
First Vienna FC	Vienna	Hohe Warte Stadium	5,500
Floridsdorfer AC	Vienna	FAC-Platz	3,000
Grazer AK	Graz	Merkur-Arena	15,323
SV Horn	Horn	Sparkasse Horn Arena	7,870
Kapfenberger SV	Kapfenberg	Franz Fekete Stadium	10,000
SV Lafnitz	Lafnitz	Sportplatz Lafnitz	3,000
Liefering	Salzburg	Untersberg-Arena	4,128
Rapid Wien II	Vienna	Allianz Stadion	28,000
Sturm Graz II	Graz	Merkur Arena	16,364
St. Pölten	Sankt Pölten	NV Arena	8,000
Vorwärts Steyr	Steyr	Vorwärts-Stadion	6,000

== League table ==
Pos	Team	Pld	W	D	L	GF	GA	GD	Pts	Promotion or relegation
1	Blau-Weiß Linz (C, P)	30	19	4	7	63	27	+36	61	Promotion to 2023–24 Austrian Football Bundesliga
2	Grazer AK	30	17	9	4	52	29	+23	60	
3	SKN St. Pölten	30	17	5	8	53	27	+26	56	
4	SV Horn	30	13	9	8	38	33	+5	48	
5	SKU Amstetten	30	12	9	9	49	49	0	45	
6	Floridsdorfer AC	30	12	9	9	41	30	+11	45	
7	First Vienna FC	30	12	7	11	34	33	+1	43	
8	SV Lafnitz	30	12	5	13	47	46	+1	41	
9	FC Liefering	30	11	4	15	52	54	−2	37	
10	Admira Wacker	30	10	6	14	39	42	−3	36	
11	FC Dornbirn	30	10	5	15	43	44	−1	35	
12	Kapfenberger SV	30	9	7	14	40	56	−16	34	
13	SK Sturm Graz II	30	10	4	16	41	56	−15	34	
14	Vorwärts Steyr (R)	30	8	8	14	36	54	−18	32	Relegation to 2023–24 Austrian Football Regionalliga
15	Rapid Wien II (R)	30	7	9	14	33	55	−22	30	Relegation to 2023–24 Austrian Football Regionalliga
16	Austria Wien II (R)	30	7	8	15	34	61	−27	29	Relegation to 2023–24 Austrian Football Regionalliga

Updated to match(es) played on 4 June 2023. Source: 2.Liga Table
Rules for classification: 1) Points; 2) Direct Duel; 3) Goal difference; 4) Goals scored; 5) Matches won; 6) Away matches won; 7) Away goals scored
(C) Champions; (P) Promoted; (R) Relegated

== Results ==
Home \ Away	AMS	ADM	AUW	BWL	DOR	FAC	FVI	GAK	HOR	KAP	LAF	LIE	RAP	STU	STP	VOR
SKU Amstetten	—	1–1	2–2	1–0	3–3	1–0	0–4	2–2	2–2	3–0	0–1	1–0	0–0	5–0	0–4	1–1
Admira Wacker	0–1	—	3–2	0–4	1–0	1–1	0–1	4–3	0–0	0–2	1–2	3–1	3–1	1–2	1–0	3–0
Austria Wien II	1–5	0–0	—	2–1	2–3	0–0	0–2	1–1	1–1	2–2	1–0	2–2	3–3	0–1	0–2	3–0
Blau-Weiß Linz	2–1	3–1	4–2	—	1–0	1–1	3–0	1–1	0–1	2–0	1–0	4–0	4–1	2–1	0–1	4–1
FC Dornbirn	1–3	1–2	3–1	2–5	—	0–0	0–0	1–1	0–1	2–1	2–1	0–2	1–2	3–1	0–3	0–2
Floridsdorfer AC	2–3	0–0	1–2	2–1	0–3	—	0–1	1–2	2–1	1–1	4–3	3–1	4–1	0–1	2–1	2–1
First Vienna FC	2–0	1–1	0–1	2–0	3–2	0–3	—	0–2	0–0	1–0	1–2	0–2	2–2	1–0	1–1	4–0
Grazer AK	3–0	1–0	3–0	0–3	2–0	0–0	1–0	—	2–0	3–1	3–1	1–0	2–0	1–1	0–0	3–2
SV Horn	2–1	2–1	1–2	2–1	0–2	1–1	0–3	2–1	—	0–0	1–2	3–1	3–0	2–1	0–1	2–2
Kapfenberger SV	1–1	2–4	4–2	2–4	2–1	0–3	3–0	1–5	0–1	—	1–5	3–2	0–2	3–1	2–1	1–1
SV Lafnitz	2–3	2–1	2–0	1–1	1–1	0–4	3–0	2–3	1–1	3–1	—	0–3	2–0	5–1	2–2	1–1
FC Liefering	4–0	1–0	5–0	0–0	0–6	1–2	1–1	0–2	3–1	1–3	3–1	—	6–1	4–2	1–2	4–3
Rapid Wien II	2–2	2–1	2–0	0–1	0–1	1–0	2–2	3–0	0–1	2–2	0–1	0–0	—	0–4	1–5	2–1
SK Sturm Graz II	3–1	2–5	1–2	0–2	0–4	0–0	0–1	2–3	2–2	0–1	2–0	4–2	1–1	—	0–2	2–0
SKN St. Pölten	2–3	2–0	5–0	0–2	2–0	1–2	3–1	0–0	0–2	2–0	2–1	2–0	1–0	2–5	—	1–1
Vorwärts Steyr	2–3	2–1	2–0	0–4	2–1	1–0	1–0	1–1	1–3	1–1	2–1	2–0	2–2	1–3	0–1	—

Updated to match(es) played on unknown. Source: soccerway.com
Legend: Blue = home team win; Yellow = draw; Red = away team win.

== Positions by round ==
Team ╲ Round	1	2	3	4	5	6	7	8	9	10	11	12	13	14	15	16	17	18	19	20	21	22	23	24	25	26	27	28	29	30
Blau-Weiß Linz	14	9	11	12	8	6	9	7	8	10	9	7	6	5	3	2	2	1	2	2	2	2	2	2	2	2	1	2	2	1
Grazer AK	11	12	5	9	10	7	3	3	6	6	8	9	8	7	5	4	4	4	4	3	3	3	3	3	3	3	3	1	1	2
St. Pölten	3	1	2	7	3	5	8	6	3	7	5	6	4	2	2	1	1	3	1	1	1	1	1	1	1	1	2	3	3	3
Horn	4	4	1	1	1	2	2	2	2	2	1	1	1	1	1	3	3	2	3	4	4	4	4	4	4	4	4	4	4	4
Amstetten	1	2	4	2	2	1	1	1	1	1	3	4	2	4	6	7	8	8	6	6	6	7	6	5	5	5	5	5	5	5
FAC	10	13	8	5	5	8	4	4	5	4	4	3	3	6	7	5	5	6	8	7	8	9	8	7	6	6	7	7	7	6
First Vienna FC	2	3	3	3	4	4	6	5	4	3	2	2	5	3	4	6	7	5	5	5	5	5	5	8	8	7	6	6	6	7
Lafnitz	5	7	12	8	9	11	7	11	9	8	6	8	9	10	10	8	6	7	7	8	7	6	5	6	7	8	8	8	8	8
Liefering	6	5	7	10	11	9	11	13	14	14	15	13	12	12	13	12	11	9	9	10	11	8	10	10	10	11	11	10	11	9
Admira Wacker	12	8	6	6	6	3	5	8	7	5	7	5	7	8	8	9	9	12	11	11	10	11	11	12	14	12	9	11	13	10
Dornbirn	15	15	16	16	15	15	14	14	11	9	10	11	10	9	9	10	10	11	10	9	9	10	9	9	9	10	12	12	10	11
Kapfenberger SV	16	16	15	15	16	16	16	16	16	16	16	16	16	16	16	16	16	16	16	15	15	16	13	13	13	9	10	9	9	12
Sturm Graz II	13	6	9	4	7	10	13	10	10	11	11	10	11	11	11	11	13	13	13	13	14	13	12	14	12	14	15	13	12	13
Vorwärts	9	10	10	11	12	12	10	12	13	13	13	15	14	15	15	14	14	14	14	14	13	14	16	16	15	16	14	15	14	14
Rapid II	7	11	14	13	13	14	15	15	15	15	14	14	15	14	14	13	12	10	12	12	12	12	11	11	11	13	13	14	15	15
Austria Wien II	8	14	13	14	14	13	12	9	12	12	12	12	13	13	12	15	15	15	15	16	16	15	15	15	16	15	16	16	16	16

Promotion to Austrian Bundesliga
Relegation to Austrian Regionalliga

Updated to match(es) played on 26 May 2023. Source: 2liga.at

== Results by round ==
Team ╲ Round	1	2	3	4	5	6	7	8	9	10	11	12	13	14	15	16	17	18	19	20	21	22	23	24	25	26	27	28	29	30
SKU Amstetten	W	W	D	D	W	W	W	L	D	W	L	L	W	D	L	L	D	L	W	L	D	D	W	W	W	L	W	D	L	D
Admira Wacker	L	W	D	W	D	W	L	L	W	W	L	W	D	L	L	L	L	L	W	D	D	L	L	L	L	W	W	L	D	W
Austria Wien II	D	L	D	L	D	D	W	W	L	L	D	W	L	L	D	L	L	L	L	L	W	W	L	W	L	W	L	D	D	L
Blau-Weiß Linz	L	W	L	D	W	W	L	W	L	L	W	W	W	W	W	W	W	W	D	W	L	W	D	W	W	D	W	L	W	W
FC Dornbirn	L	L	L	L	D	D	W	W	W	W	L	L	W	W	L	L	D	L	W	W	D	L	W	L	L	L	L	D	W	D
Floridsdorfer AC	D	L	W	W	D	L	W	W	D	W	W	D	D	L	D	W	L	L	L	D	L	L	W	W	W	D	L	D	W	W
First Vienna FC	W	W	D	D	D	D	L	W	W	W	W	L	L	W	D	L	L	W	L	D	W	L	L	L	D	W	W	W	L	L
Grazer AK	D	L	W	D	D	W	W	W	L	D	D	D	W	D	W	W	L	W	W	W	W	W	D	W	L	W	W	W	W	D
SV Horn	W	W	W	W	D	D	W	L	L	W	W	W	L	D	W	L	W	W	L	D	D	L	D	L	D	W	D	W	L	D
Kapfenberger SV	L	L	D	L	L	D	L	L	L	L	L	D	L	W	W	L	W	L	D	W	W	D	W	W	D	W	D	W	L	L
SV Lafnitz	W	L	L	W	D	L	W	L	W	W	W	L	L	D	L	W	W	D	D	L	D	W	W	L	L	L	L	L	W	W
FC Liefering	D	W	L	D	L	W	L	L	L	L	L	W	W	L	L	W	W	W	W	L	D	W	D	L	L	L	D	W	L	W
Rapid Wien II	D	L	D	D	D	L	L	L	W	L	W	L	L	W	D	W	W	W	L	D	D	L	L	W	D	L	D	L	L	L
SK Sturm Graz II	L	W	D	W	L	L	L	W	D	D	L	W	L	L	W	L	L	W	L	L	L	W	D	L	W	L	L	W	W	L
SKN St. Pölten	W	W	D	L	W	L	L	W	W	L	W	D	W	W	W	W	W	L	W	W	D	W	D	W	W	D	L	L	L	W
Vorwärts Steyr	D	L	W	L	D	D	W	L	D	L	L	L	W	L	L	W	L	D	D	D	W	L	L	L	W	D	W	L	W	L

Source: 2liga.at
W = Win; D = Draw; L = Lose

== Season statistics ==
=== Top scorers ===
Rank	Player	Club	Goals
1	(Brazil) Ronivaldo	Blau-Weiß Linz	19
2	(Ivory Coast) Karim Konate	FC Liefering	15
2	(Austria) Stefan Feiertag	SKU Ertl Glas Amstetten	15
4	(Croatia) Jurica Poldrugac	SV Licht-Loidl Lafnitz	13
4	(Hungary) Milan Toth	Sturm Graz II	13
6	(Austria) Matthias Seidl	Blau-Weiß Linz	12
6	(France) Luis Hartwig	St. Pölten	12
8	(Austria) Mark Grosse	Kapfenberger SV	11
8	(France) Fally Mayulu	Blau-Weiß Linz	11

== See also ==
- 2022–23 Austrian Football Bundesliga
- 2022–23 Austrian Cup
