= Felix Gschossmann =

Austrian footballer

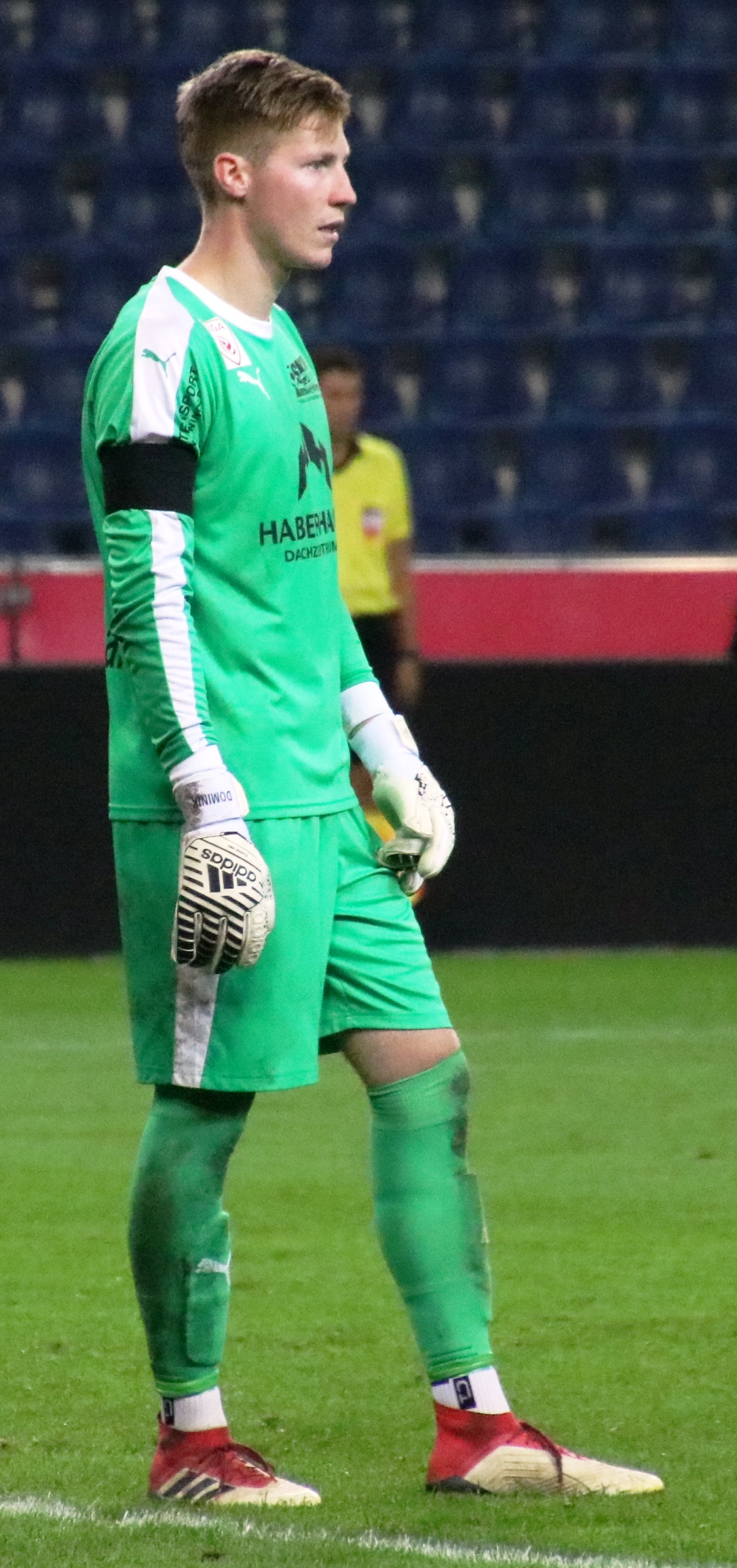
- Gschossmann in 2018

Personal information
- Date of birth: 3 October 1996 (age 30)
- Place of birth: Amstetten, Austria
- Height: 1.83 m (6 ft 0 in)
- Position: Goalkeeper

Team information
- Current team: Schwarz-Weiß Bregenz
- Number: 21

Youth career
- 2003–2010: TSV Nochling
- 2010–2014: AKA St. Polten

Senior career*
Years	Team	Apps	(Gls)
2014–2017	SKN St. Pölten II	18	(0)
2017–2020	SKU Amstetten	30	(0)
2020–2024	Blau-Weiß Linz	4	(0)
2024	→ SKN St. Pölten (loan)	5	(0)
2024–	Schwarz-Weiß Bregenz	19	(0)
- * Club domestic league appearances and goals as of 17 May 2026

Felix Gschossmann (born 3 October 1996) is an Austrian professional footballer who plays as a goalkeeper for 2. Liga club Schwarz-Weiß Bregenz.

== Career ==
On 3 February 2024, Gschossman returned to SKN St. Pölten on loan.

For the 2024–25 season, Gschossman moved to Schwarz-Weiß Bregenz.
