= Lukas Tursch =

Austrian footballer

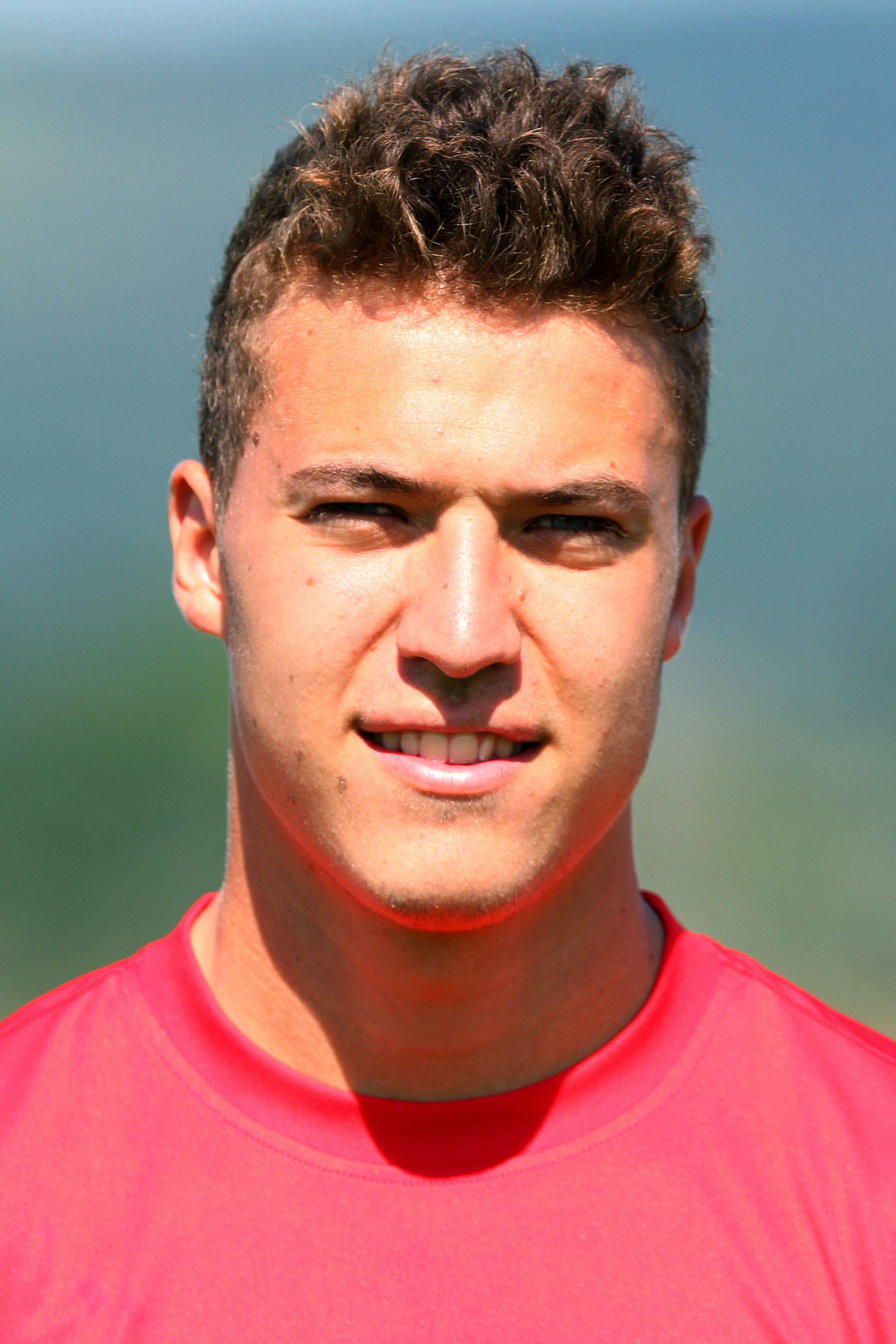
- Tursch in 2016

Personal information
- Date of birth: 29 March 1996 (age 30)
- Place of birth: Austria
- Height: 1.84 m (6 ft 0 in)
- Positions: Defensive midfielder; centre back

Team information
- Current team: ASKÖ Oedt
- Number: 23

Youth career
- 2002–2010: Union FC Ternberg
- 2010–2014: AKA Linz

Senior career*
Years	Team	Apps	(Gls)
2014–2015	SV Horn	20	(0)
2015–2016	Austria Lustenau	16	(0)
2016–2018	Floridsdorfer AC	60	(3)
2018–2021	Blau-Weiß Linz	65	(9)
2021–2022	SKN St. Pölten	18	(0)
2022–2025	Blau-Weiß Linz	38	(1)
2025–	ASKÖ Oedt	19	(2)

International career
2012–2013	Austria U17	19	(0)
2014	Austria U18	3	(0)
2014–2015	Austria U19	7	(0)
- * Club domestic league appearances and goals as of 27 June 2026

Lukas Tursch (born 29 March 1996) is an Austrian footballer who plays as a defensive midfielder or centre back for ASKÖ Oedt.

== Career ==
=== Blau-Weiß Linz ===
On 15 June 2018, Tursch joined FC Blau-Weiß Linz on a two-year deal.

On 24 June 2022, Tursch came back to FC Blau-Weiß Linz on a two-year deal.

=== SKN St. Pölten ===
On 8 February 2021, he moved to SKN St. Pölten.
