= Danilo Mitrović =

Serbian football player

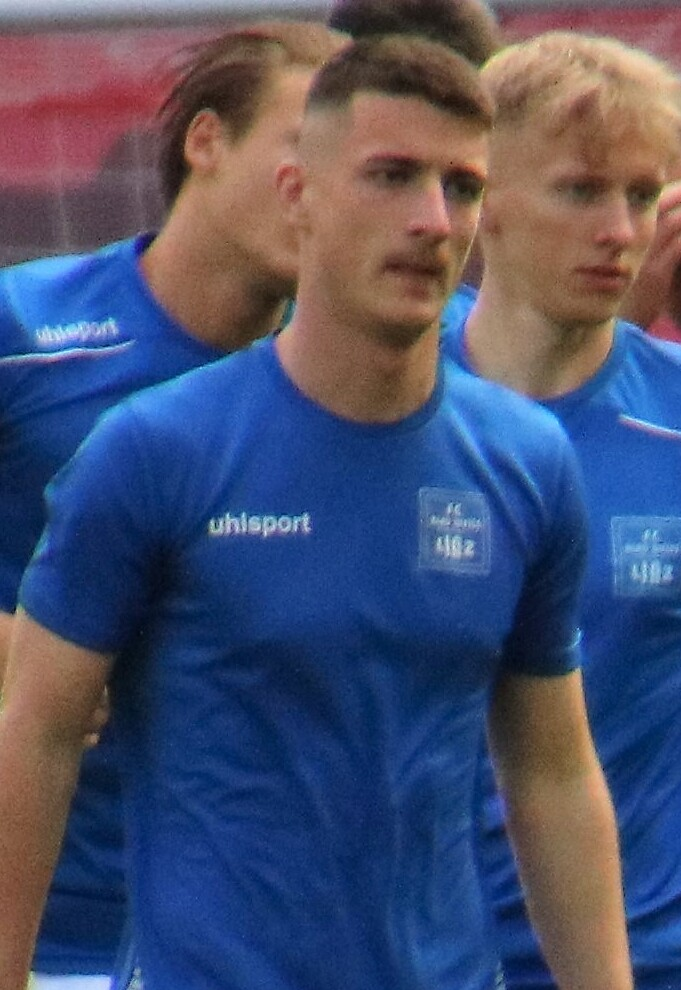
- Mitrović in 2021

Personal information
- Date of birth: 23 March 2001 (age 25)
- Place of birth: Novi Sad, FR Yugoslavia
- Height: 1.83 m (6 ft 0 in)
- Position: Centre-back

Team information
- Current team: Aktobe
- Number: 3

Youth career
- –2019: Vojvodina

Senior career*
Years	Team	Apps	(Gls)
2019–2025	Blau-Weiß Linz	130	(7)
2025–2026	Radnički 1923	5	(0)
2026–	Aktobe	3	(0)

International career^{‡}
2021–	Serbia U21	3	(0)
- * Club domestic league appearances and goals as of 20 June 2026 ‡ National team caps and goals as of 21:35, 8 June 2021 (UTC)

Danilo Mitrović (Serbian Cyrillic: Данило Митровић; born 23 March 2001) is a Serbian professional footballer who plays as a centre-back for Kazakhstan Premier League club Aktobe.
