= Fabio Strauss =

Austrian footballer

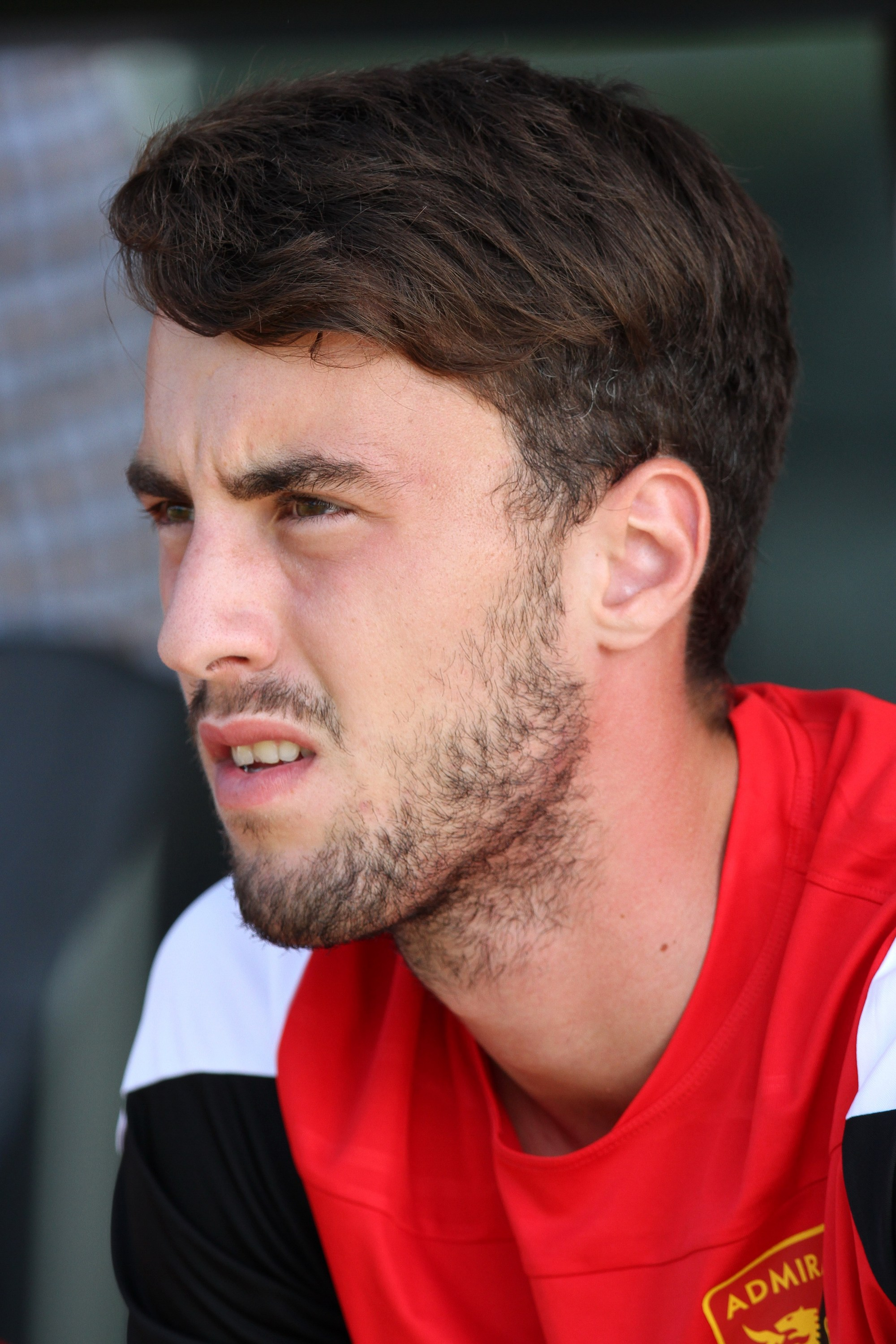
- Strauss with Admira Wacker in 2016

Personal information
- Date of birth: 6 August 1994 (age 32)
- Place of birth: Salzburg, Austria
- Position: Centre-back

Team information
- Current team: Blau-Weiß Linz
- Number: 2

Youth career
- –2001: Austria Salzburg
- 2001–2009: Red Bull Salzburg
- 2009–2010: Austria Salzburg

Senior career*
Years	Team	Apps	(Gls)
2010–2014	Austria Salzburg	61	(0)
2014–2016	Grödig	17	(0)
2016–2020	Admira Wacker	61	(0)
2020–	Blau-Weiß Linz	127	(6)
- * Club domestic league appearances and goals as of 10 June 2026

Fabio Strauss (born 6 August 1994) is an Austrian professional footballer who plays for Blau-Weiß Linz, as a centre-back.

== Career ==
Born in Salzburg, Strauss has played for Austria Salzburg and SV Grödig.

On 28 August 2020, he joined Blau-Weiß Linz.
