= Donauparkstadion =

Stadium in Linz, Austria

Coordinates: 48.3164°N 14.2989°E

Hofmann Personal Stadion
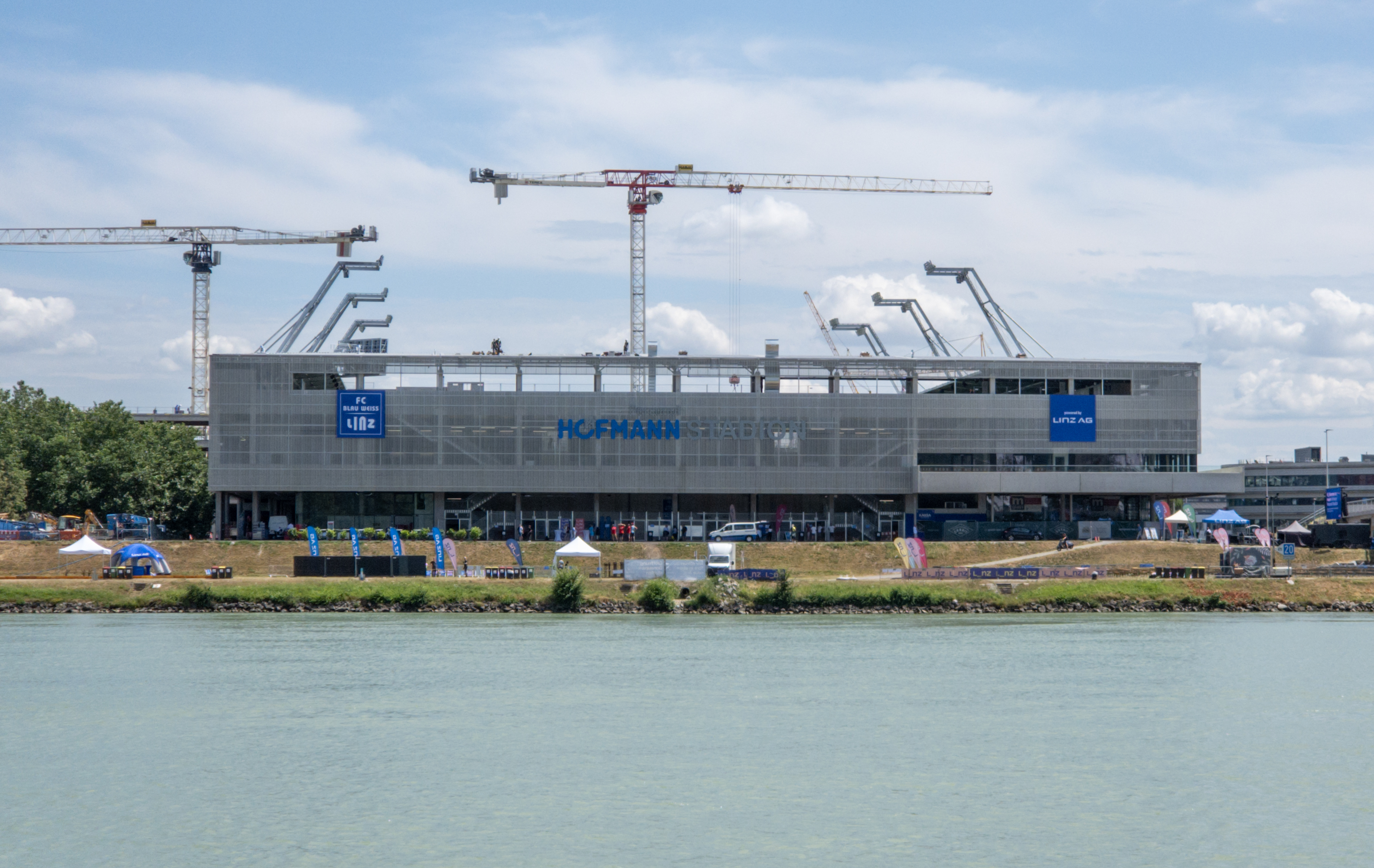
- Opening of the new Donaupark Stadium on July 5, 2023
- Interactive map of Hofmann Personal Stadion
- Former names: Tabak-Sportplatz; Donauparkstadion
- Location: Linz, Austria
- Capacity: 5,595
- Surface: Natural grass

Construction
- Opened: 1935 (old stadium); 5 July 2023 (new stadium)
- Renovated: 1954, 1993, 2021–2023
- Demolished: 16 September 2021 (old stadium)
- Rebuilt: 16 September 2021
- Architects: Margula & Mauch Architects ZT GmbH

Tenant
- Blau-Weiß Linz

Donauparkstadion (Danube Park Stadium), known as Hofmann Personal Stadion for sponsorship reasons, is a stadium in Lustenau, a quarter of the city of Linz, Austria. It is used for football matches and is the home ground of Blau-Weiß Linz. The stadium holds 5,000 fans.

== History ==
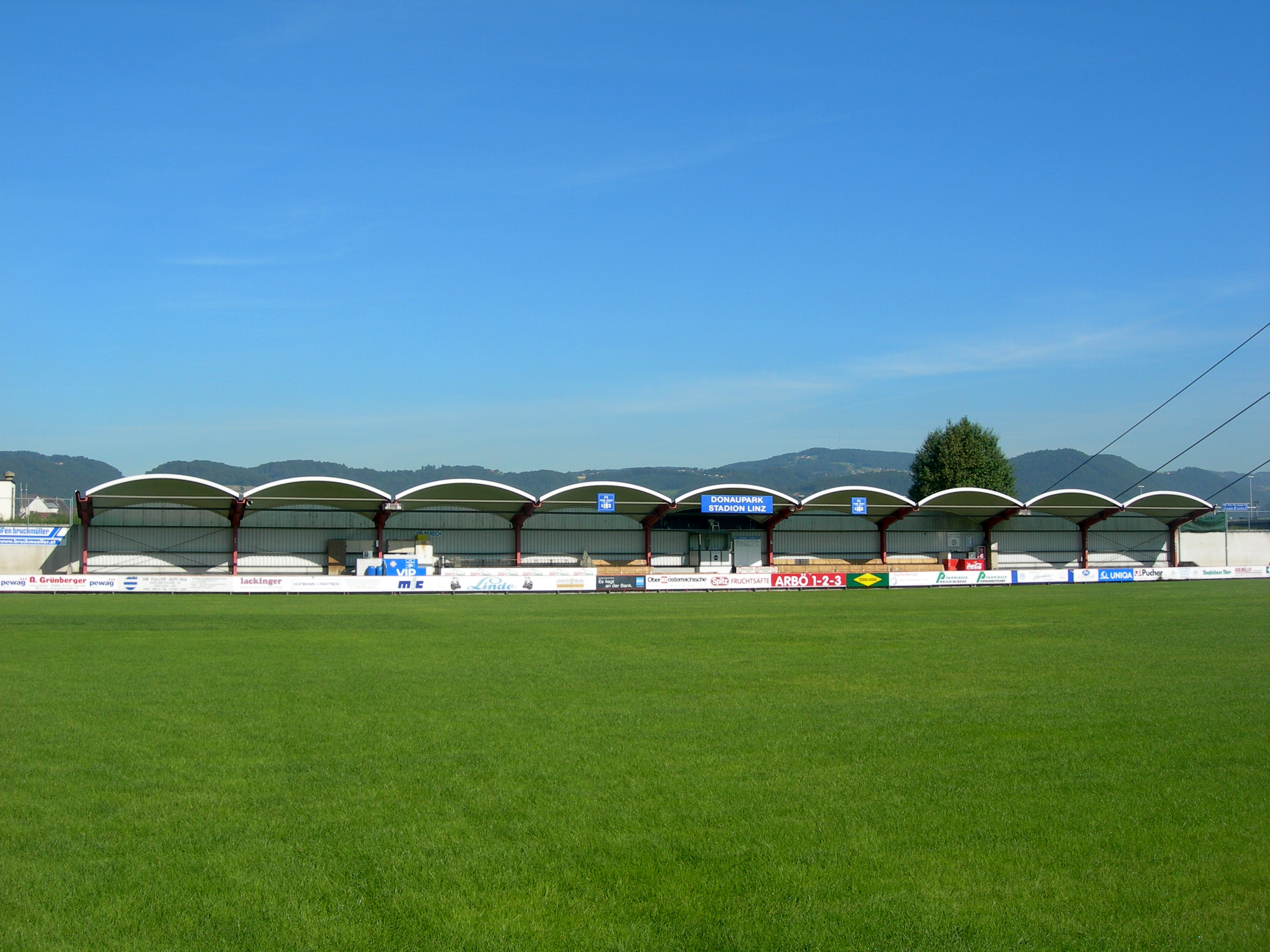
Old Stadium, Mainstand, 2006

Tabak-Sportplatz (original name) was built in 1935 as the homeground of SV Austria Tabak Linz. It was renamed Donauparkstadion on August 1, 1997 after the merger of SV Austria Tabak and FC Linz to FC Blau-Weiß Linz. It hosted 2,000 fans, with 400 seats.

Until FC Blau-Weiß Linz was promoted to the first league in 2011, the Donauparkstadion served as their home ground. Thereafter it was used as a training facility for the first team and as a venue for the club's amateur team. FC Blau-Weiß Linz plays in Gugl Stadium.

The stadium was expanded in 2023.

From 2023–24 season, Donauparkstadion will be renaming to Hofmann Personal Stadion due to sponsorship.

On 15 July 2023, Blau-Weiß Linz inaugurated the stadium against PSV, losing 1-2 in a friendly match. The first goal was by Ronivaldo.

== Transport ==
=== Private ===
The stadium is on Straßerau, which can be reached via the Hafenstraße junction of the Mühlkreis Autobahn and Hafenstraße.

=== Bus ===
The closest buses to the stadium are Petzoldstraße and Schlachthof on line 27 of the Linz Linien.
