= LASK =

Austrian football club, based in Linz

- Full name: Linzer Athletik-Sport-Klub
- Nicknames: Die Schwarz-Weißen (The Black-Whites); Die Laskler; Landstraßler; Athletiker
- Founded: 7 August 1899; 127 years ago as Athletiksportklub Siegfried
- Ground: Raiffeisen Arena
- Capacity: 19,080
- Owner: LASK GmbH
- President: Siegmund Gruber
- Head coach: Dietmar Kühbauer
- League: Austrian Bundesliga
- 2025–26: Austrian Bundesliga, 1st of 12 (champions)
- Website: lask.at
Home colours	Away colours	Third colours

Linzer Athletik-Sport-Klub (German pronunciation: [lask]), or Linzer ASK, is an Austrian professional football club based in Upper-Austrian state capital Linz. It is the oldest football club in that region, and plays in the Austrian Football Bundesliga, the top tier of Austrian football. The club's colours are black and white. The women's team plays in the highest division of Austrian women's football.

It is one of the few clubs of the country's higher divisions that, since coming into existence, never exhibited a sponsor in the official club name.

In 1965, the club became the first team outside Vienna to win the Austrian football championship. They won their second Austrian football championship in 2026. The club currently plays its home games at the Raiffeisen Arena in Linz.

== History ==
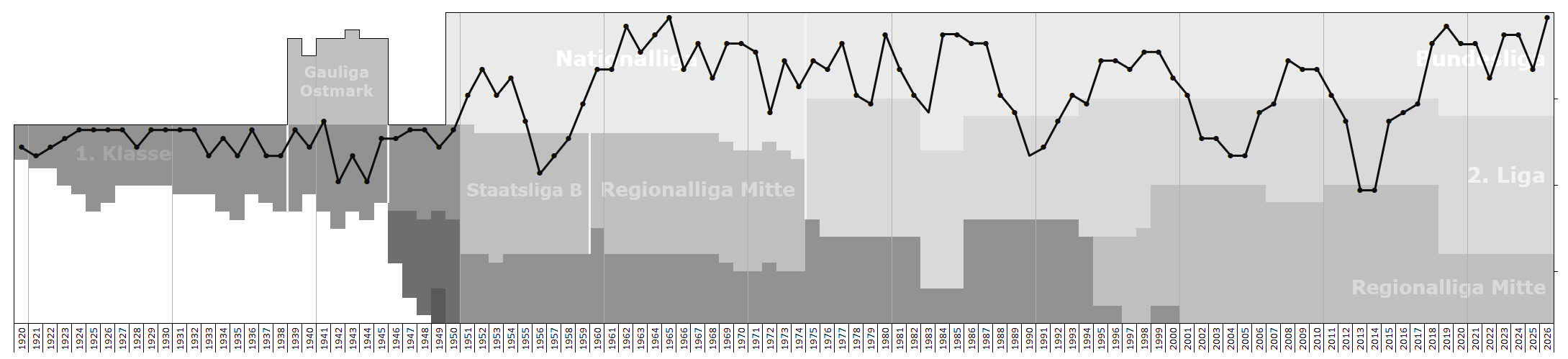
Historical chart of LASK league performance

In the winter of 1908, Albert Siems, head of the royal post-office garage at Linz, who had already been a member of an 1899-founded club for heavy athletics, Linzer Athletik Sportklub Siegfried, decided to establish a football club. At that time, the side already played in the black-and-white lengthwise-touched shirts.

The club's first name was Linzer Sportclub. During an extraordinary general meeting on 14 September 1919, the final change of name, to Linzer Athletik Sport-Klub (short form Linzer ASK) took place, its forerunner setting the example. Nevertheless, the public denomination of the team was largely LASK. The club first appeared in top-flight competition in the Gauliga Ostmark in 1940–41, coming last and being relegated. In 1949–50, LASK was promoted, becoming professional for the first time in its history. However, years in the top flight were tough, and the club was involved in a relegation battle most of the time, until it was finally relegated in 1953–54.

In 1957–58, LASK won the second division and was promoted again. In 1961–62, the club finished runner up to Austria Wien, their best position in history up to that time, and in 1962–63 they played their first cup final, losing 1–0 to Austria Wien. Two years later, LASK achieved its greatest success, winning the Austrian League in 1965. No club outside Vienna had ever won before. Additionally, the club won the Austrian cup that same year, completing a domestic double and becoming one of the only Austrian clubs to do so. In 1967, the club reached the cup final again, losing again to Austria Wien on a coin toss after extra time was played. Three years later the club reached the cup final again, losing to Wacker Innsbruck. The club spent most of the 70s in mid table, but were relegated in 1977–78, although achieving immediate promotion for the 1980–81 season.

In the 1985–86 UEFA Cup, the side beat European giants Internazionale Milan at home (1–0), on 23 October 1985, eventually bowing out 4–1 on aggregate (second round).

In 1995, the club slipped into a financial crisis, and filed for bankruptcy. The president fled to Ivory Coast with large chunks of money, leaving the club with severe debt, and forcing the sale of several key players. In May 1997, the club merged with city rivals FC Linz, and the new official name became LASK Linz, as officials wanted to bring out the city's name as a complement to the LASK designation, which had constituted itself as a brand name. The club name, colours, chairmen and members remained the same, effectively saving the club from dissolving. However, this merger angered many people, who believed that FC Linz were a more successful club than LASK. Ten days before the merger, FC Linz beat LASK 3–0 in the city derby. For the next few years, the players that LASK took from FC Linz made a big part of the starting lineup.

Despite the financial struggles, the club still managed to steer away from relegation and qualify for the 1996 Intertoto Cup. In the Intertoto Cup, LASK had a great participation, finishing first in its group with no losses, with notable wins over Werder Bremen (3–1) and Djurgården (2–0). In the semi-finals, the club was eliminated 7–2 on aggregate by Rotor Volgograd. In the 1998–99 season they reached their fourth Austrian cup final, losing to Sturm Graz on penalties.

In 2000–01, the club was relegated, and at one point was close to being relegated to the third division. In August 2004, the club suffered an 8–0 home defeat to FC Kärnten. In 2007, after six years in the second division, they were promoted to the highest division again. However, just four years later, the club was relegated back to the second division, followed by relegation to the 3. Liga in 2012 due to a license withdrawal caused by bankruptcy. The club was taken over by a consortium of local entrepreneurs called "Friends of LASK" in December 2013. By this time the club was on the verge of being shut down, and the players received no salary. They could not afford the city stadium, so they moved to a stadium 50 km away. It was only because of the tremendous cohesion of the coach and the team that the club was able to keep the championship going at that time.

In the first season after the takeover, LASK finished first in the Regionalliga Central Division, and qualified for the promotion playoffs, but lost 5–0 on aggregate to FC Liefering and had to stay another season in the third division.

Promotion to the 2. Liga was secured on 5 June 2014 after a 2–1 victory on aggregate over Parndorf 1919 in front of 13,000 fans at the Linzer Stadion. On 21 April 2017, the club returned to the Bundesliga with six rounds to go after a 3–0 victory over Liefering. During this time, head coach Oliver Glasner and Vice President Jürgen Werner constructed a team with an unmistakable style of play.

In 2016, the club moved to Pasching after disagreements with the city council. In 2018, the club returned to the European competitions, but they were eliminated from the Europa league qualifiers after a 2–1 win against Beşiktaş in the second leg due to the away goals rule.

In the 2019–20 UEFA Europa League, LASK had an excellent campaign, topping their group which consisted of European champions Sporting Lisbon and PSV Eindhoven. LASK began their campaign with a 1–0 win over Rosenborg, and later beat PSV 4–1, concluding their group stage campaign with a 3–0 home victory against Sporting on 12 December 2019. In the round of 32, LASK faced Dutch club AZ Alkmaar. The first leg finished 1–1, but in the second leg LASK had a stellar performance, winning 2–0 and qualifying to the round of 16, where they were eliminated by Manchester United with a 7–1 aggregate score. Although LASK were eliminated with a large score margin, this was their best European campaign and the club gained attention as an underdog after their victories against PSV and Sporting. On 24 February 2023, LASK officially opened their new stadium called Raiffeisen Arena in a victory against Austria Lustenau.

In the 2025–26 season, LASK secured the domestic double for the second time in the club's history, and the first since 1964–65. The club won the Austrian Cup after defeating SCR Altach 4–2 after extra time in the final, and secured the Bundesliga title on the final matchday with a 3–0 away victory over Austria Wien.

In the 2026-27 season, LASK achieved a historic win against Celtic in the Champions League play-off round, after being down 3-0 in the first leg, LASK managed to win 5-1 in the second leg despite Celtic scoring the first goal and advanced to the Champions League for the first time in their history.

== Logos ==
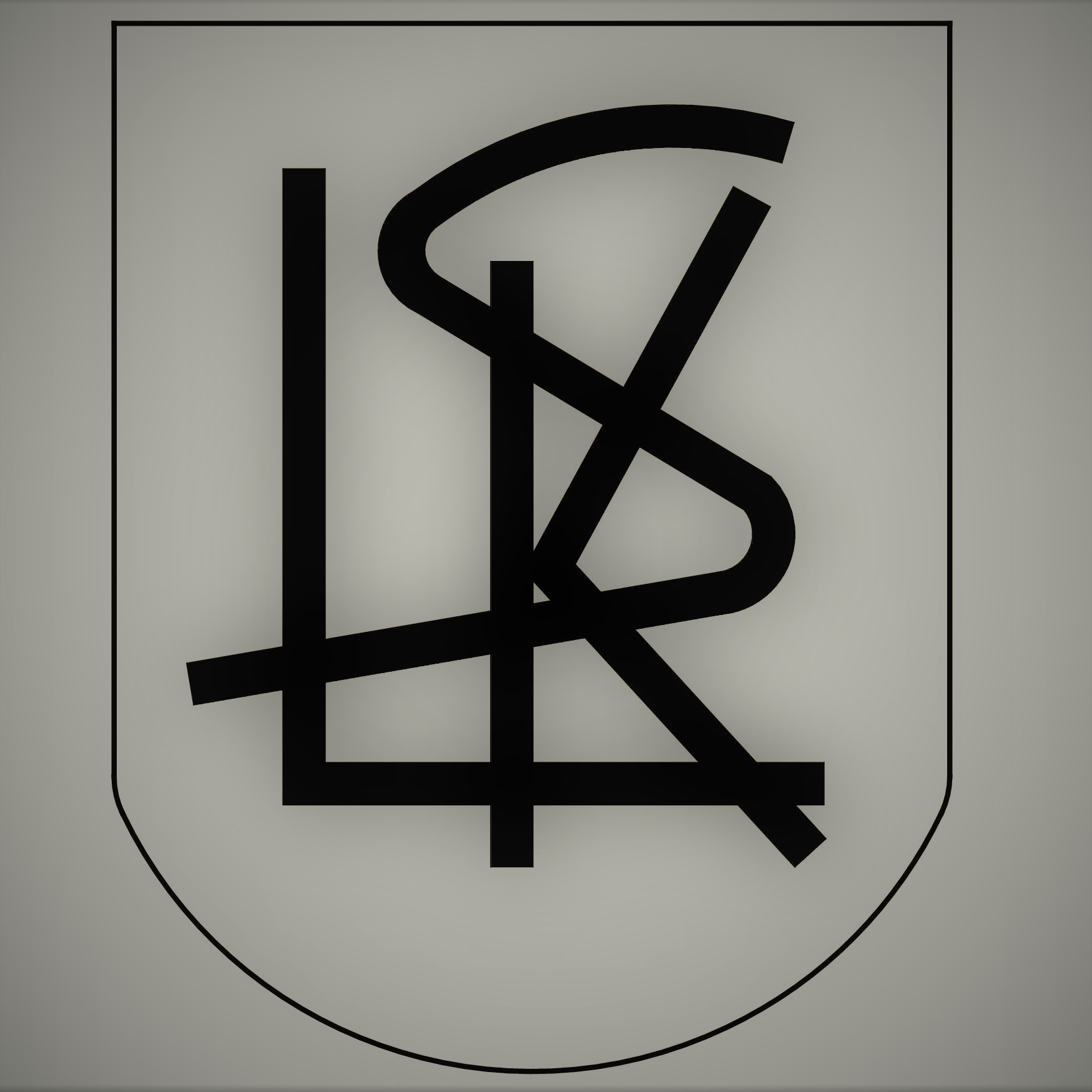
Logo of the Linz Sports Club (LSK) 1908–1919 on the jerseys

Old logo until 2017

Old logo (2017–2023)

New logo since May 2023

In 2017, the club removed the "Linz" part of their name and returned it to LASK. The merger with FC Linz has long fallen apart and the club have now removed "Linz" from the name.

== Players ==
=== Current squad ===
As of 2 September 2026

Note: Flags indicate national team as defined under FIFA eligibility rules; some limited exceptions apply. Players may hold more than one non-FIFA nationality.

No.	Pos.	Nation	Player
1	GK	AUT	Lukas Jungwirth
2	DF	USA	George Bello
3	DF	JAM	Miguel Freckleton
4	DF	NED	Xavier Mbuyamba
5	MF	KOS	Art Smakaj
6	MF	SUR	Melayro Bogarde
7	FW	USA	Samuel Adeniran
8	FW	NGR	Moses Usor
9	MF	CZE	Kryštof Daněk
10	MF	CRO	Robert Ljubičić (on loan from AEK Athens)
14	FW	AUT	Saša Kalajdžić
15	MF	MLI	Mohamed Sanogo
16	DF	PAN	Andrés Andrade
18	MF	AUT	Alessandro Schöpf

No.	Pos.	Nation	Player
20	DF	DEN	Kasper Jørgensen
21	DF	COD	Manoël Verhaeghe
22	FW	FRA	Ramiz Harakaté
23	MF	LBA	Daniel Elfadli (on loan from Hamburg)
25	DF	CMR	Yvan Dibango
27	FW	AUT	Christoph Lang
29	DF	AUT	Florian Flecker
30	MF	AUT	Sascha Horvath (captain)
33	GK	AUT	Tobias Schützenauer
37	FW	MNE	Filip Perović
43	DF	BRA	Alemão
45	MF	CAN	Nael Kane
50	GK	AUT	Fabian Schillinger
52	DF	MLI	Cheikne Kébé

=== Out on loan ===
Note: Flags indicate national team as defined under FIFA eligibility rules; some limited exceptions apply. Players may hold more than one non-FIFA nationality.

No.	Pos.	Nation	Player
—	DF	NGR	Emmanuel Michael (at Admira Wacker until 30 June 2027)
—	DF	AUT	Yanis Traun (at SKN St. Pölten until 30 June 2027)

No.	Pos.	Nation	Player
—	MF	NGR	Adetunji Adeshina (at Slaven Belupo until 30 June 2027)
—	FW	AUT	Jakob Wanker (at Hertha Wels until 30 June 2027)

== Club officials ==
Position	Staff member(s)
President	(Austria) Siegmund Gruber
Vice presidents	(Austria) Christoph Königslehner (Austria) Barbara Niedermayr
Chief financial officer	(Austria) Hans Jürgen Jandrasits
Head coach	(Austria) Dietmar Kühbauer
Assistant head coach	(Austria) Maximilian Ritscher (Austria) Manfred Nastl
Goalkeeper coach	(Austria) Philip Großalber
Athletic coach	(Austria) Jan Kollmann
Video analyst	(Slovenia) Mario Milanič
Sports coordinator	(Croatia) Dino Buric
Team doctor	(Austria) Rainer Hochgatterer
Physiotherapist	(Germany) Rudolf Ehmann (Spain) Javier Cordero (Austria) Niklas Mühlbacher
Masseur	(Austria) Michael Spreitzer (Slovakia) Vernes Sijak
Head of physical condition and rehabilitation	(South Africa) Divan Augustyn
Kitman	(Austria) Michael Foissner
Bus driver	(Austria) Gerhard Gruber
Team manager	(Austria) Thomas Gebauer

== Historical list of coaches ==
As of 12 January 2025

- (Austria) Georg Braun (1946–1952)
- (Austria) Walter Alt (1950–1953)
- (Austria) Ernst Sabeditsch (1953–1955)
- (Austria) Josef Epp (1958–1960)
- (Hungary) Pál Csernai (1960–1962)
- (Austria) Karl Schlechta (1962–1964)
- (Czechoslovakia) František Bufka (1965–1968)
- (Czechoslovakia) Vojtech Skyva (1969–1970)
- (Austria) Wilhelm Kment (1970–1972)
- (Socialist Federal Republic of Yugoslavia) Otto Barić (1972–1974)
- (Austria) Felix Latzke (1974–1976)
- (Austria) Wilhelm Huberts (1976–1978)
- (West Germany) Wolfgang Gayer (1978)
- (Hungary) Laszlo Simko (1978)
- (Austria) Adolf Blutsch (1978–1983)
- (Austria) Johann Kondert (1983–1987)
- (Austria) Adolf Blutsch (1987)
- (Czechoslovakia) Ernst Hložek (1987–1988)
- (Austria) Ernst Knorrek (1988)
- (West Germany) Lothar Buchmann (1989)
- (Poland) Adam Kensy (1989)
- (Poland) Aleksander Mandziara (1989–1990)
- (Austria) Erwin Spiegel (1990)
- (Austria) Adolf Blutsch (1990)
- (Austria) Ernst Weber (1990)
- (Hungary) Erwin Spiegel (1990–91)
- (Austria) Helmut Senekowitsch (1991–1993)
- (Austria) Dietmar Constantini (1993)
- (Austria) Walter Skocik (1993–1995)
- (Austria) Günter Kronsteiner (1995–1996)
- (Austria) Max Hagmayr (1996)
- (Germany) Friedel Rausch (1996–1997)
- (Norway) Per Brogeland (1997–1998)
- (Austria) Adam Kensy (1998, caretaker)
- (Croatia) Otto Barić (1998–1999)
- (Croatia) Marinko Koljanin (1999–2000)
- (Austria) Johann Kondert (2000–2001)
- (Czech Republic) František Cipro (2001)
- (Austria) Johann Kondert (2001)
- (Austria) Dieter Mirnegg (2001–2002)
- (Austria) Norbert Barisits (2003–2004)
- (Austria) Klaus Lindenberger (2004)
- (Austria) Werner Gregoritsch (2004–2006)
- (Austria) Karl Daxbacher (2006–2008)
- (Croatia) Andrej Panadić (2008)
- (Austria) Klaus Lindenberger (2008–2009)
- (Austria) Hans Krankl (2009)
- (Germany) Matthias Hamann (2009–2010)
- (Austria) Helmut Kraft (2010)
- (Austria) Georg Zellhofer (2010–2011)
- (Austria) Walter Schachner (2011–2012)
- (Austria) Karl Daxbacher (2012–2015)
- (Austria) Martin Hiden (2015)
- (Austria) Alfred Olzinger (2015)
- (Austria) Oliver Glasner (2015–2019)
- (France) Valérien Ismaël (2019–2020)
- (Austria) Dominik Thalhammer (2020–2021)
- (Austria) Andreas Wieland (2021–2022)
- (Austria) Dietmar Kühbauer (2022–2023)
- (Austria) Thomas Sageder (2023–2024)
- (Austria) Thomas Darazs (2024)
- (Austria) Markus Schopp (2024-2025)
- (Portugal) João Sacramento (2025)
- (Austria) Dietmar Kühbauer (2025–present)

== Honours ==
=== League ===
- Austrian League
  - Winners (2): 1964–65, 2025–26
  - Runners-up (2): 1961–62, 2018–19
- Austrian Second Division
  - Winners (5): 1978–79, 1991–92, 1993–94, 2006–07, 2016–17

=== Cups ===
- Austrian Cup
  - Winners (2): 1964–65, 2025–26
  - Runners-up (5): 1962–63, 1966–67, 1969–70, 1998–99, 2020–21

== European competition history ==
As of match played 4 November 2026

Season	Competition	Round	Country	Club	Home	Away	Aggregate
1963–64	European Cup Winners' Cup	1	(Socialist Federal Republic of Yugoslavia)	Dinamo Zagreb	1–0	0–1	2–2 c (po 1–1 (a.e.t.))
1965–66	European Cup	PR	(Poland)	Górnik Zabrze	1–3	1–2	2–5
1969–70	Inter-Cities Fairs Cup	1	(Portugal)	Sporting CP	2–2	0–4	2–6
1977–78	UEFA Cup	1	(Hungary)	Újpest	3–2	0–7	3–9
1980–81	UEFA Cup	1	(Socialist Federal Republic of Yugoslavia)	Radnički Niš	1–2	1–4	2–6
1984–85	UEFA Cup	1	(Sweden)	Östers IF	1–0	1–0	2–0
1984–85	UEFA Cup	2	(Scotland)	Dundee United	1–2	1–5	2–7
1985–86	UEFA Cup	1	(Czechoslovakia)	Baník Ostrava	2–0	1–0	3–0
1985–86	UEFA Cup	2	(Italy)	Inter Milan	1–0	0–4	1–4
1986–87	UEFA Cup	1	(Poland)	Widzew Łódź	1–1	0–1	1–2
1987–88	UEFA Cup	1	(Netherlands)	Utrecht	0–0	0–2	0–2
1995	UEFA Intertoto Cup	Group 6	(Scotland)	Partick Thistle	2–2	—N/a	2nd
1995	UEFA Intertoto Cup	Group 6	(Croatia)	NK Zagreb	—N/a	0–0	2nd
1995	UEFA Intertoto Cup	Group 6	(Iceland)	Keflavík	2–1	—N/a	2nd
1995	UEFA Intertoto Cup	Group 6	(France)	Metz	—N/a	0–1	2nd
1996	UEFA Intertoto Cup	Group 2	(Sweden)	Djurgårdens IF	2–0	—N/a	1st
1996	UEFA Intertoto Cup	Group 2	(Faroe Islands)	B68 Toftir	—N/a	4–0	1st
1996	UEFA Intertoto Cup	Group 2	(Cyprus)	Apollon Limassol	2–0	—N/a	1st
1996	UEFA Intertoto Cup	Group 2	(Germany)	Werder Bremen	—N/a	3–1	1st
1996	UEFA Intertoto Cup	Semi-finals	(Russia)	Rotor Volgograd	2–2	0–5	2–7
1999–2000	UEFA Cup	1	(Romania)	Steaua București	1–3	0–2	1–5
2000	UEFA Intertoto Cup	1R	(Israel)	Hapoel Petah-Tikva	3–0	1–1	4–1
2000	UEFA Intertoto Cup	2R	(Czech Republic)	FC Marila Pribram	1–1	2–3	3–4
2018–19	UEFA Europa League	2QR	(Norway)	Lillestrøm	4–0	2–1	6–1
2018–19	UEFA Europa League	3QR	(Turkey)	Beşiktaş	2–1	0–1	2–2 (a)
2019–20	UEFA Champions League	3QR	(Switzerland)	Basel	3–1	2–1	5–2
2019–20	UEFA Champions League	PO	(Belgium)	Club Brugge	0–1	1–2	1–3
2019–20	UEFA Europa League	Group D	(Portugal)	Sporting CP	3–0	1–2	1st
2019–20	UEFA Europa League	Group D	(Netherlands)	PSV Eindhoven	4–1	0–0	1st
2019–20	UEFA Europa League	Group D	(Norway)	Rosenborg	1–0	2–1	1st
2019–20	UEFA Europa League	R32	(Netherlands)	AZ	2–0	1–1	3–1
2019–20	UEFA Europa League	R16	(England)	Manchester United	0–5	1–2	1–7
2020–21	UEFA Europa League	3QR	(Slovakia)	DAC Dunajská Streda	7−0	—N/a	—N/a
2020–21	UEFA Europa League	PO	(Portugal)	Sporting CP	—N/a	4−1	—N/a
2020–21	UEFA Europa League	Group J	(England)	Tottenham Hotspur	3–3	0–3	3rd
2020–21	UEFA Europa League	Group J	(Bulgaria)	Ludogorets Razgrad	4–3	3–1	3rd
2020–21	UEFA Europa League	Group J	(Belgium)	Antwerp	0–2	1–0	3rd
2021–22	UEFA Europa Conference League	3QR	(Serbia)	Vojvodina	6–1	1–0	7–1
2021–22	UEFA Europa Conference League	PO	(Scotland)	St Johnstone	1–1	2–0	3–1
2021–22	UEFA Europa Conference League	Group A	(Israel)	Maccabi Tel Aviv	1–1	1–0	1st
2021–22	UEFA Europa Conference League	Group A	(Armenia)	Alashkert	2–0	3–0	1st
2021–22	UEFA Europa Conference League	Group A	(Finland)	HJK	3–0	2–0	1st
2021–22	UEFA Europa Conference League	R16	(Czech Republic)	Slavia Prague	4–3	1–4	5–7
2023–24	UEFA Europa League	PO	(Bosnia and Herzegovina)	Zrinjski Mostar	2–1	1–1	3–2
2023–24	UEFA Europa League	Group E	(England)	Liverpool	1–3	0–4	4th
2023–24	UEFA Europa League	Group E	(Belgium)	Union Saint-Gilloise	3–0	1–2	4th
2023–24	UEFA Europa League	Group E	(France)	Toulouse	1–2	0–1	4th
2024–25	UEFA Europa League	PO	(Romania)	FCSB	1–1	0–1	1–2
2024–25	UEFA Conference League	League phase	(Sweden)	Djurgården	2–2	—N/a	35th
2024–25	UEFA Conference League	League phase	(Slovenia)	Olimpija Ljubljana	—N/a	0–2	35th
2024–25	UEFA Conference League	League phase	(Belgium)	Cercle Brugge	0–0	—N/a	35th
2024–25	UEFA Conference League	League phase	(Bosnia and Herzegovina)	Borac Banja Luka	—N/a	1–2	35th
2024–25	UEFA Conference League	League phase	(Italy)	Fiorentina	—N/a	0–7	35th
2024–25	UEFA Conference League	League phase	(Iceland)	Víkingur Reykjavik	1–1	—N/a	35th
2026–27	UEFA Champions League	PO	(Scotland)	Celtic	5–1 (a.e.t.)	0–3	5–4
2026–27	UEFA Champions League	League phase	(Greece)	AEK Athens	—N/a	0–1	
2026–27	UEFA Champions League	League phase	(England)	Liverpool	3–6	—N/a	
2026–27	UEFA Champions League	League phase	(Portugal)	Sporting CP	—N/a	3–2	
2026–27	UEFA Champions League	League phase	(Slovakia)	Slovan Bratislava		—N/a	
2026–27	UEFA Champions League	League phase	(Norway)	Bodø/Glimt	—N/a		
2026–27	UEFA Champions League	League phase	(Turkey)	Fenerbahçe		—N/a	
2026–27	UEFA Champions League	League phase	(Spain)	Real Madrid	—N/a		
2026–27	UEFA Champions League	League phase	(Portugal)	Porto		—N/a	

=== UEFA club ranking ===
See also: UEFA coefficient

As of 12 January 2025

Rank	Team	Points
67	(Czech Republic) Sparta Prague	29.500
68	(Denmark) Midtjylland	28.500
69	(Austria) LASK	28.000
70	(Germany) SC Freiburg	28.000
71	(Sweden) Djurgårdens IF	26.000
