= FC Blau-Weiß Linz =

Association football club in Austria

Blau-Weiss Linz
- Full name: Fußball Club Blau-Weiß Linz
- Founded: 2 July 1997; 29 years ago
- Stadium: Hofmann Personal Stadion
- Capacity: 5,595
- Chairman: Jens Großmann
- Manager: Michael Köllner
- League: 2. Liga (Austria)
- 2025–26: Austrian Bundesliga, 12th of 12 (relegated)
- Website: www.blauweiss-linz.at
Home colours	Away colours

FC Blau-Weiss Linz or BW Linz are an Austrian association football club playing in the Austrian Football Second League, the second tier of Austrian Football.

== History ==
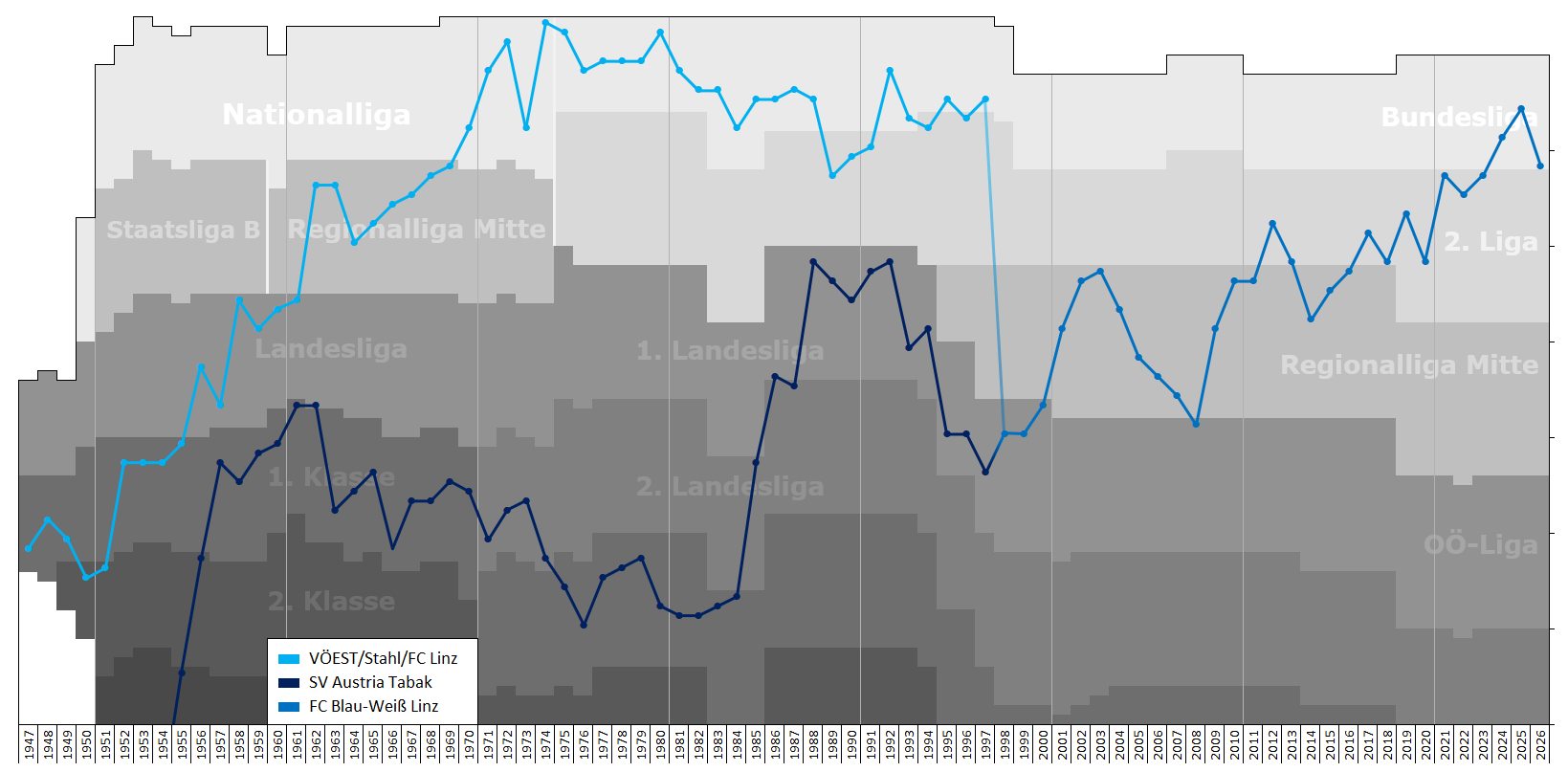
Historical chart of league performance of Blau-Weiß Linz and their predecessor

In 1997, FC Blau-Weiss Linz was founded, which adopted the traditions of the defunct club FC Linz, which due to financial difficulties had to finally dissolve, by merger with their long-time rivals LASK Linz.

On 4 June 2023, Blau Weiss Linz secured the title of Austrian 2. Liga in 2022–23 after defeating Sturm Graz II 2–1 on final matchday 30 and promotion to Austrian Bundesliga for the first time in history from next 2023–24 season. (They also secured the title back in 2020–21, but promotion was denied as they did not apply for a Bundesliga license.)

== Stadium ==
FC Blau-Weiss Linz played their home matches at Linzer Stadion, but they have plans to develop their own stadium, Hofmann Personal Stadion, to accommodate nearly 5,000 people by 2023.

== Current squad ==
As of 2 July 2026

Note: Flags indicate national team as defined under FIFA eligibility rules; some limited exceptions apply. Players may hold more than one non-FIFA nationality.

No.	Pos.	Nation	Player
1	GK	AUT	Valentin Oelz
2	DF	AUT	Fabio Strauss
5	MF	AUT	Nico Grimbs
7	FW	GER	Erik Weinhauer
8	MF	GUI	Karim Conté
9	FW	AUT	Ronivaldo
10	FW	AUT	Filip Ristanic
11	FW	AUT	Romeo Vucic
12	GK	AUT	Marcel Köstenbauer

No.	Pos.	Nation	Player
15	DF	AUT	Manuel Maranda
17	DF	AUT	Alem Pašić
21	MF	AUT	Felix Gerstmayer
22	DF	AUT	David Riegler
26	GK	AUT	Christopher Giuliani
27	MF	AUT	Thomas Schiestl
28	MF	AUT	Dominik Frieser
29	DF	GER	Felix Ruschke
32	DF	AUT	Matthias Wetschka

=== Out on loan ===
Note: Flags indicate national team as defined under FIFA eligibility rules; some limited exceptions apply. Players may hold more than one non-FIFA nationality.

No. / Pos. / Nation / Player	No. / Pos. / Nation / Player

== Staff and board members ==
- Manager: Michael Köllner
- Manager Director: Stefan Reiter
- Director Sport: Konstantin Wawra
- Management: Stephanie Höller
- Management: Peter Huliak

== Honours ==
- Austrian 2. Liga
  - Winners (2): 2020–21, 2022–23

== Manager history ==
As of 21 December 2025

- Unknown (1997–1998)
- (Poland) Adam Kensy (1998–2003)
- (Austria) Gerald Perzy (2003)
- (Austria) Günther Zeller (2003–2004)
- (Austria) Gerald Perzy (2004)
- (Austria) Dieter Mirnegg (2004–2005)
- (Austria) Gerald Perzy (2005)
- (Austria) Adolf Blutsch (2005–2007)
- (Austria) Samir Hasanovic (2007)
- (Austria) Erwin Spiegel (2007–2008)
- (Austria) Gerald Perzy (2008)
- (Poland) Adam Kensy (2008–2011)
- (Austria) Gerald Perzy (2011)
- (Austria) Thomas Weissenböck (2011–2012)
- (Austria) Gerald Perzy (2012)
- (Germany) Edi Stöhr (2012–2013)
- (Austria) Yahya Genc (2013–2014)
- (Austria) Wilhelm Wahlmüller (2014–2016)
- (Austria) Max Babler (2016)
- (Austria) Klaus Schmidt (2016–2017)
- (Austria) Günther Gorenzel-Simonitsch (2017–2021)
- (Austria) Gerald Scheiblehner (2021–2025)
- (Slovenia) Mitja Mörec (2025)
- (Germany) Michael Köllner (2026–present)
