= 2026–27 SK Rapid season =

Austrian football club season

Sportklub Rapid
2026–27 season
- Chairman: Alexander Wrabetz
- Head coach: Johannes Hoff Thorup
- Stadium: Allianz Stadion
- Bundesliga: 1st (Regular season)
- Austrian Cup: Quarterfinals
- UEFA Conference League: Play-off round
- Top goalscorer: League: Ercan Kara (8 goals); All: Ercan Kara (12 goals)
- Highest home attendance: 24 700 vs. SK Sturm Graz, 30 August 2026
- Lowest home attendance: 16 795 vs. SCR Altach, 2 August 2026
- Average home league attendance: 20 100
- All statistics correct as of 21 November 2026.

The 2026–27 season is the 127th season in the existence of the Sportklub Rapid and the club's 78th consecutive season in the top flight of Austrian football. In addition to the domestic league, Rapid participates in this season's edition of the Austrian Cup and enters international football in the second qualifying round to the UEFA Conference League after winning the previous Bundesliga seasons Conference League Play-off.

After advancing two rounds through Conference League qualifying against FC Santa Coloma from Andorra and Paide Linnameeskond from Estonia they were eliminated in the Play-off round by Scottish Premiership runners-up Heart of Midlothian losing on penalties.

In the domestic cup, Rapid were drawn against Regionalliga Ost side SV Wienerberg in the first round and advanced. In the second round, they were drawn against Austria Klagefurt from the Regionalliga Mitte, eventually advancing to the round of 16. Rapid then were drawn against First Vienna in the round of 16, winning the tie and advancing to the quarterfinals.

Remarkable events in the domestic league include a 8–0 win against Grazer AK on matchday 3, their highest in this competition since 1985.

== Squad ==
=== Squad statistics ===
No.	Nat.	Name	Age	League		Austrian Cup		UEFA Competitions		Total		Discipline		
No.	Nat.	Name	Age	Apps	Goals	Apps	Goals	Apps	Goals	Apps	Goals	Yellow card	(yellow card) (red card)	Red card
Goalkeepers
1	(Austria)	Niklas Hedl	25	13		1		6		20				
25	(Austria)	Paul Gartler	29			2				2				
Defenders
2	(Austria)	Eaden Roka	18	1+4		3		1+1		5+5				
4	(Austria)	Jakob Schöller	20	2+1		1		1+1		4+2		1		
6	(France)	Serge-Philippe Raux-Yao	27	12+1	1	1		5+1	2	18+2	3	2		
20	(Ivory Coast)	Ange Ahoussou	22	1				0+1		1+1		1		
23	(Austria)	Jonas Auer	25	0+2		0+1		4		4+3				
24	(Madagascar)	Jean Marcelin	26											
33	(Austria)	Dominic Vincze	22											
38	(Germany)	Jannes Horn	29	12+1	2	1		2+2		15+3	2	2		
47	(Tunisia)	Amìn-Elias Gröller	21			2				2				
55	(Serbia)	Nenad Cvetković	30	11	3	2		6	2	19	5	2		
61	(Turkey)	Furkan Demir	21	0+1		0+3				0+4				
77	(Hungary)	Bendegúz Bolla	26	13	1	2		5	1	20	2	5		
Midfielders
14	(Cameroon)	Martin Ndzie	23											
17	(Norway)	Tobias Gulliksen	22			1		2+1		3+1				
18	(Austria)	Matthias Seidl	25	12+1	1	2	1	5+1		19+2	2	2		
21	(Austria)	Louis Schaub	31	0+9		1+2		2+2	1	3+13	1	1		
22	(Austria)	Yusuf Demir	23	13	7	1+1	1	3+2	1	17+3	9	2		
28	(Austria)	Moritz Oswald	24			0+1				0+1				
29	(Ivory Coast)	Romeo Amane	23	2+1				4		6+1		2		
30	(Austria)	Nicolas Bajlicz	21	12+1		3	1	1+5		16+6	1	2		
Forwards
7	(Australia)	Marco Tilio	24	2+11	2	2+1		3+2	1	7+14	3	2		
8	(Denmark)	Tonni Adamsen	31	12+1	5	2+1	2	4+1		18+3	7			
9	(Austria)	Ercan Kara	30	11+2	8	1+1		4	4	16+3	12	1		
10	(Norway)	Petter Nosa Dahl	22	11+2	7	1+2		3+3	2	15+7	9	3		
15	(Austria)	Nikolaus Wurmbrand	20	0+13	1	1+1	3	3+3	2	4+17	6	2		
43	(Mali)	Moulaye Haïdara	19	3+8	1	2	1	2+4	3	7+12	5			
54	(Ghana)	Daniel Nunoo	19											
71	(France)	Claudy Mbuyi	27	0+6	2	1+1	2			1+7	4	1		

=== Goal scorers ===
Name	Bundesliga	Cup	International	Total
(Austria) Ercan Kara	8		4	12
(Norway) Petter Nosa Dahl	7		2	9
(Austria) Yusuf Demir	7	1	1	9
(Denmark) Tonni Adamsen	5	2		7
(Austria) Nikolaus Wurmbrand	1	3	2	6
(Serbia) Nenad Cvetković	3		2	5
(Mali) Moulaye Haïdara	1	1	3	5
(France) Claudy Mbuyi	2	2		4
(France) Serge-Philippe Raux-Yao	1		2	3
(Australia) Marco Tilio	2		1	3
(Hungary) Bendegúz Bolla	1		1	2
(Germany) Jannes Horn	2			2
(Austria) Matthias Seidl	1	1		2
(Austria) Nicolas Bajlicz		1		1
(Austria) Louis Schaub			1	1
Own goals
(South Korea) Lee Tae-seok (Austria Wien)	1			1
Totals	42	11	19	72

=== Disciplinary record ===
Name	Bundesliga			Cup			International			Total		
Name	Yellow card	(yellow card) (red card)	Red card	Yellow card	(yellow card) (red card)	Red card	Yellow card	(yellow card) (red card)	Red card	Yellow card	(yellow card) (red card)	Red card
(Hungary) Bendegúz Bolla	2						3			5		
(Norway) Petter Nosa Dahl	2						1			3		
(Ivory Coast) Romeo Amane	1						1			2		
(Austria) Nicolas Bajlicz	1						1			2		
(Serbia) Nenad Cvetković	1			1						2		
(Austria) Yusuf Demir	2									2		
(Germany) Jannes Horn	2									2		
(France) Serge-Philippe Raux-Yao	2									2		
(Austria) Matthias Seidl	1						1			2		
(Australia) Marco Tilio	1			1						2		
(Austria) Nikolaus Wurmbrand	2									2		
(Ivory Coast) Ange Ahoussou							1			1		
(Austria) Ercan Kara	1									1		
(France) Claudy Mbuyi	1									1		
(Austria) Louis Schaub							1			1		
(Austria) Jakob Schöller							1			1		
Totals	19			2			10			31		

== Transfers ==
=== In ===
Pos.	Nat.	Name	Age	Moved from	Type	Transfer Window	Ref.
DF	(Austria)	Benjamin Böckle	24	(Austria) WSG Tirol	Loan return	Summer	
DF	(Austria)	Dominik Vincze	22	(Austria) TSV Hartberg	Loan return	Summer	
FW	(France)	Ismaïl Seydi	24	(Portugal) Torreense	Loan return	Summer	
MF	(Austria)	Moritz Oswald	24	(Austria) SCR Altach	Loan return	Summer	
FW	(Montenegro)	Andrija Radulović	23	(Israel) Hapoel Haifa	Loan return	Summer	
FW	(Denmark)	Tonni Adamsen	31	(Denmark) Silkeborg IF	Transfer	Summer	
MF	(Austria)	Nicolas Bajlicz	21	(Austria) SV Ried	Transfer	Summer	

=== Out ===
Pos.	Nat.	Name	Age	Moved to	Type	Transfer Window	Ref.
FW	(Martinique)	Janis Antiste	23	(Italy) Sassuolo	Loan return	Summer	
FW	(Austria)	Andreas Weimann	34	(England) Derby County	Loan return	Summer	
MF	(Austria)	Lukas Grgić	30	(Italy) SSC Bari	Free transfer	Summer	
MF	(Norway)	Tobias Børkeeiet	27	(Norway) Sandefjord Fotball	Free transfer	Summer	
MF	(Austria)	Dominik Weixelbraun	22	SC Austria Lustenau	Loan	Summer	
DF	(Austria)	Benjamin Böckle	24	(Austria) SC Rheindorf Altach	Transfer	Summer	
FW	(France)	Ismaïl Seydi	25	(Denmark) Sønderjyske Fodbold	Transfer	Summer	
MF	(Austria)	Moritz Oswald	24	(Austria) WSG Tirol	Loan	Summer	
MF	(Norway)	Tobias Gulliksen	23	(Turkey) Kocaelispor	Loan	Summer	
MF	(Ivory Coast)	Romeo Amane	23	(Belgium) RSC Anderlecht	Transfer	Summer	
FW	(Montenegro)	Andrija Radulović	24	(Austria) TSV Hartberg	Loan	Summer	

== Pre-season and friendlies ==
Win Draw Loss Fixtures

27 June 2026 Friendly	Rapid	4–1	(Austria) Floridsdorfer AC	Vienna, Austria
	Kara 9'; Haidara 11' 36'; Tilio 67'	Report	1' Glavan	Stadium: Körner Trainginszentrum

5 July 2026 Friendly	FK Pardubice (Czech Republic)	2–2	Rapid	Perg, Austria
15:00	Drchal 3'; Tanko 75'	Report	17' (o.g.) Traore; 90' Polke	Stadium: Forstenlechner Arena; Attendance: 1 300

5 July 2026 Friendly	Rapid București (Romania)	0–0	Rapid	Perg, Austria
17:15		Report		Stadium: Forstenlechner Arena; Attendance: 1 300

12 July 2026 Friendly	FC Hertha Wels (Austria)	1–2	Rapid	Wels, Austria
15:00	Freund 70'	Report	48' Roka; 67' Adamsen	Stadium: eww-Stadion; Attendance: 1 200

15 July 2026 Friendly	Rapid	4–1	(Greece) Panathinaikos F.C.	Vienna, Austria
18:00	Tilio 14'; Adamsen 37'; Haidara 43'; Schaub 89'	Report	104' Pantelidis	Stadium: Allianz Stadion; Attendance: 6 046; Referee: Harald Lechner

18 July 2026 Friendly	Rapid	3–2	(Germany) Hamburger SV	Vienna, Austria
19:00	Kara 3' 35'; Auer 36'	Report	5' Poulsen; 24' Grønbæk	Stadium: Allianz Stadion; Attendance: 14 541

26 September 2026 Friendly	Venezia FC (Italy)	1–0	Rapid	Venice, Italy
17:00	Lauberbach 13'	Report		Stadium: Stadio Pier Luigi Penzo; Attendance: 2 190

12 November 2026 Friendly	Rapid	3–0	(Slovakia) DAC 1904	Vienna, Austria
14:00	Mbuyi 44'; Schaub 54'; Auer 71'	Report		Stadium: Körner Trainginszentrum

== Competitions ==
=== Overall record ===
Competition	First match	Last match	Starting round	Final position	Record							
Competition	First match	Last match	Starting round	Final position	Pld	W	D	L	GF	GA	GD	Win %
Austrian Football Bundesliga	2 August				13	12	0	1	42	9	+33	92.31
Austrian Cup	26 July		Round 1		3	3	0	0	11	2	+9	100.00
Conference League	23 July	27 August	Second qualifying round	Play-off round	6	4	2	0	19	8	+11	66.67
Total					22	19	2	1	72	19	+53	86.36

Source: Soccerway

=== Austrian Football Bundesliga ===
==== Results summary ====
Overall								Home						Away					
Pld	W	D	L	GF	GA	GD	Pts	W	D	L	GF	GA	GD	W	D	L	GF	GA	GD
13	12	0	1	42	9	+33	36	7	0	0	29	3	+26	5	0	1	13	6	+7

Source: Austrian Football Bundesliga

==== Results by round ====
Round	1	2	3	4	5	6	7	8	9	10	11	12	13
Ground	H	A	H	A	H	A	H	A	H	H	A	H	A
Result	W	W	W	L	W	W	W	W	W	W	W	W	W
Position	3	2	1	3	3	2	1	1	1	1	1	1	1

Source: Austrian Football Bundesliga
A = Away; H = Home; W = Win; D = Draw; L = Loss

==== Regular season ====
===== Table =====
Pos	Team	Pld	W	D	L	GF	GA	GD	Pts	Qualification
1	SK Rapid	12	11	0	1	39	9	+30	33	Qualification for the Championship round
2	Red Bull Salzburg	12	9	3	0	33	9	+24	30	Qualification for the Championship round
3	LASK	12	8	1	3	30	15	+15	25	Qualification for the Championship round
4	TSV Hartberg	12	6	2	4	23	19	+4	20	Qualification for the Championship round
5	Sturm Graz	12	5	4	3	22	17	+5	19	Qualification for the Championship round

Updated to match(es) played on 8 November 2026. Source: Austrian Football Bundesliga
Rules for classification: 1) Points; 2) Head-to-head record; 3) Goal difference; 4) Goals scored; 5) Matches won; 6) Away matches won; 7) Away goals scored.

===== Matches =====
2 August 2026 1	Rapid	1–0	Altach	Vienna
19:00	Dahl 4'	Report		Stadium: Allianz Stadion; Attendance: 16 795; Referee: Jakob Semler

9 August 2026 2	Ried	1–2	Rapid	Ried im Innkreis
17:00	Schwab 75'	Report	8' Horn; 77' Haïdara	Stadium: BWT X Upper Austrian Arena; Attendance: 6 695; Referee: Walter Altmann

17 August 2026 3	Rapid	8–0	GAK	Vienna
19:00	Kara 5' 12'; Adamsen 14' 45+4' 74' 86'; Cvetković 42'; Y. Demir 56'	Report		Stadium: Allianz Stadion; Attendance: 17 651; Referee: Arnes Talic

2 September 2026 4	RB Salzburg	5–1	Rapid	Wals-Siezenheim
20:30	Tabaković 4' 21'; Veratschnig 15'; Baidoo 46'; Konaté 90'	Report	51' Seidl	Stadium: Red Bull Arena; Attendance: 12 153; Referee: Jakob Semler

30 August 2026 5	Rapid	3–1	Sturm	Vienna
17:00	Y. Demir 7' (pen.); Tilio 17'; Dahl 86'	Report	10' Beganović; (red card) 90' Vallçi	Stadium: Allianz Stadion; Attendance: 24 700; Referee: Stefan Ebner

12 September 2026 6	Wolfsberg	0–3	Rapid	Wolfsberg
19:30		Report	13' Raux-Yao; 35' Cvetković; 82' Dahl	Stadium: Lavanttal-Arena; Referee: Alain Sadikovski

18 September 2026 7	Rapid	3–0	WSG Tirol	Vienna
19:30	Kara 33'; Bolla 67'; Wurmbrand 86'	Report		Stadium: Allianz Stadion; Attendance: 18 217; Referee: Harald Lechner

11 October 2026 8	LASK	0–2	Rapid	Linz
17:00		Report	58' Kara; 82' Mbuyi	Stadium: Raiffeisen Arena; Attendance: 19 100; Referee: Arnes Talic

16 October 2026 9	Rapid	3–1	Hartberg	Vienna
19:30	Dahl 5' 45+1'; Horn 81'	Report	49' Dalpiaz	Stadium: Allianz Stadion; Attendance: 20 797; Referee: Daniel Pfister

24 October 2026 10	Rapid	5–1	Austria Lustenau	Vienna
19:30	Kara 6'; Cvetković 8'; Y. Demir 41' (pen.) 67'; Tilio 85'	Report	61' Ismailcebioglu	Stadium: Allianz Stadion; Attendance: 21 400; Referee: Walter Altmann

1 November 2026 11	Austria Wien	0–2	Rapid	Vienna
17:00		Report	60' (pen.) Y. Demir; 82' (o.g.) Lee T.-s.	Stadium: Franz Horr Stadium; Attendance: 13 500; Referee: Stefan Ebner

6 November 2026 12	Rapid	6–0	Wolfsberg	Vienna
19:30	Dahl 9' 45'; Kara 67' 79'; Adamsen 76'; Mbuyi 83'	Report		Stadium: Allianz Stadion; Attendance: 20 991; Referee: Safak Barmaksiz

21 November 2026 13	GAK	0–3	Rapid	Graz
19:30	Hermesh (yellow card) (red card) 26'	Report	3' Kara; 50' 62' Y. Demir	Stadium: Liebenauer Stadium; Referee: Julian Weinberger

28 November 2026 14	Austria Lustenau	v	Rapid	Lustenau
19:30				Stadium: Reichshofstadion

5 December 2026 15	Rapid	v	LASK	Vienna
19:30				Stadium: Allianz Stadion

12 December 2026 16	Rapid	v	Ried	Vienna
19:30				Stadium: Allianz Stadion

January 2027 17	Hartberg	v	Rapid	Hartberg
				Stadium: Stadion Hartberg

January 2027 18	Rapid	v	Austria Wien	Vienna
				Stadium: Allianz Stadion

February 2027 19	WSG Tirol	v	Rapid

February 2027 20	Sturm	v	Rapid	Graz
				Stadium: Liebenauer Stadium

February 2027 21	Rapid	v	RB Salzburg	Vienna
				Stadium: Allianz Stadion

February 2027 22	Altach	v	Rapid	Altach
				Stadium: Stadion Schnabelholz

=== Austrian Cup ===
27 July 2026 1st round	SV Wienerberg	0–3	Rapid	Vienna
20:30		Report	Adamsen 45+1' 54'; Haidara 65'	Stadium: Wienerberg Arena; Attendance: 1 400; Referee: Davor Divkovic

5 September 2026 2nd round	Austria Klagenfurt	2–5	Rapid	Klagenfurt
20:30	Schoppitsch 34' 46'	Report	28' Seidl; 40' 57' 69' Wurmbrand; 62' Bajlicz	Stadium: Wörthersee Stadion; Attendance: 3 350; Referee: Florian Jäger

27 October 2026 Round of 16	First Vienna	0–3	Rapid	Vienna
18:00		Report	18' Y. Demir; 69' 86' Mbuyi	Stadium: Hohe Warte Stadium; Attendance: 6 168; Referee: Christian-Petru Ciochirca

February 2027 Quarterfinals	Rapid	v	Altach	Vienna
				Stadium: Allianz Stadion

=== UEFA Conference League ===
==== Second qualifying round ====
23 July 2026 First leg	FC Santa Coloma (Andorra)	1–3	Rapid	Andorra la Vella, Andorra
	Muñoz 54'	Report	50' Raux-Yao; 56' Y. Demir; 89' Haïdara	Stadium: Estadi Nacional; Attendance: 627; Referee: Matthew MacDermid (Scotland)

30 July 2026 Second leg	Rapid	6–2 (9–3 agg.)	(Andorra) FC Santa Coloma	Vienna, Austria
20:30	Kara 10' 33' 63'; Dahl 24'; Cvetković 58'; Wurmbrand 82'	Report	30' Guti; 87' Rodriguez	Stadium: Weststadion; Attendance: 13 208; Referee: Visar Kastrati (Kosovo)

==== Third qualifying round ====
6 August 2026 First leg	Paide Linnameeskond (Estonia)	1–4	Rapid	Tallinn, Estonia
18:00	Luts 41'	Report	5' (pen.) Bolla; 83' 90+4' Haïdara; 85' Dahl	Stadium: Lilleküla Stadium; Referee: Danilo Nikolić (Serbia)

12 August 2026 Second leg	Rapid	2–0 (6–1 agg.)	(Estonia) Paide Linnameeskond	Vienna, Austria
18:00	Tilio 38'; Schaub 82' (pen.)	Report		Stadium: Weststadion; Attendance: 13 705; Referee: Denys Shurman (Ukraine)

==== Play-off round ====
20 August 2026 First leg	Heart of Midlothian (Scotland)	2–2	Rapid	Edinburgh, Scotland
19:45	Raux-Yao 56' (o.g.); Wilson 62'	Report	30' Raux-Yao; 79' Wurmbrand	Stadium: Tynecastle Park; Referee: Manfredas Lukjančukas (Lithuania)

26 August 2026 Second leg	Rapid	2–2 (a.e.t.) (4–4 agg.) (3–4 p)	(Scotland) Heart of Midlothian	Vienna, Austria
18:45	Kara 35'; Cvetković 119'	Report	(yellow card) (red card) 76' Magnússon; 79' Kaboré; 101' Miller	Stadium: Weststadion; Attendance: 23 975; Referee: Elchin Masiyev (Azerbaijan)
	Penalties
	Kara (penalty scored); Schaub (penalty scored); Haidara (penalty missed); Y. Demir (penalty scored); Tilio (penalty missed)		(penalty scored) Miller; (penalty scored) Altena; (penalty scored) Mato; (penalty scored) Kerjota; (penalty missed) McEntee
