= 2025–26 SK Rapid season =

Sportklub Rapid
2025–26 season
- Chairman: Alexander Wrabetz
- Head coach: Peter Stöger (until 28 November); Stefan Kulovits (interim); Johannes Hoff Thorup (from 30 December)
- Stadium: Allianz Stadion
- Bundesliga: Winner (Conference League play-offs); 5th (Championship round); 5th (Regular season)
- Austrian Cup: Quarterfinal
- UEFA Conference League: League phase, 36th
- Top goalscorer: League: Ercan Kara (6 goals); All: Ercan Kara (8 goals)
- Highest home attendance: 26,000 vs. Austria Wien, 28th August 2025
- Lowest home attendance: 10,400 vs Wolfsberger AC, 21st February 2025
- Average home league attendance: 18,900
Home colours	Away colours	Third colours
- All statistics correct as of 25 May 2026.

The 2025–26 season was the 128th season in the existence of the Sportklub Rapid and the club's 77th consecutive season in the top flight of Austrian football. In addition to the domestic league, Rapid participated in this season's edition of the Austrian Cup and entered international football in the second qualifying round to the UEFA Conference League after winning the previous Bundesliga seasons Conference League Play-off.

Peter Stöger was appointed as the new head coach on 2 June 2025, with Thomas Sageder and former interim manager Stefan Kulovits as his assistants. On November 28, after 8 defeats in the most recent 12 games, Stöger and Sageder were sacked, with Kulovits again taking over as interim manager. In the winter break, Johannes Hoff Thorup was appointed as new head coach.

== Squad ==
=== Squad statistics ===
No.	Nat.	Name	Age	League		Austrian Cup		UEFA Competitions		Total		Discipline		
No.	Nat.	Name	Age	Apps	Goals	Apps	Goals	Apps	Goals	Apps	Goals	Yellow card	(yellow card) (red card)	Red card
Goalkeepers
1	(Austria)	Niklas Hedl	24	28		3		10		41		2		
25	(Austria)	Paul Gartler	28	6		1		2		9		3		
Defenders
4	(Austria)	Jakob Schöller	19	11+1	3			1+1		12+2	3	1		1
6	(France)	Serge-Philippe Raux-Yao	26	31		4		6		41		4		
20	(Ivory Coast)	Ange Ahoussou	21	17+9		1+1		8+1		26+11		2		
23	(Austria)	Jonas Auer	24	2+4		1+1		3+3		6+8		1		
24	(Madagascar)	Jean Marcelin	25	2		1				3		1		
38	(Germany)	Jannes Horn	28	19+2		2		8	1	29+2	1	7		
42	(Austria)	Eaden Roka	17					0+1		0+1				
47	(Tunisia)	Amìn-Elias Gröller	20	0+3				2+1		2+4				
55	(Serbia)	Nenad Cvetković	29	29+1	2	3		9+1		41+2	2	5		
61	(Turkey)	Furkan Demir	20	7+8		1+1		5+4		13+13		8		
77	(Hungary)	Bendegúz Bolla	25	28+1	4	3+1	1	8+1		39+3	5	4		
Midfielders
7	(Australia)	Marco Tilio	23	3+10	1	2		0+1		5+11	1	2		
8	(Austria)	Lukas Grgić	29	7+9		0+1		6+3		13+13		5		
14	(Cameroon)	Martin Ndzie	22	4+4		2		1+3		7+7		3		
16	(Norway)	Tobias Børkeeiet	26	0+9						0+9		2		
17	(Norway)	Tobias Gulliksen	21	11+13		3	2	4+2		18+15	2	5		
17	(Mali)	Mamadou Sangaré	23	3		1		2		6		3		
18	(Austria)	Matthias Seidl	24	27+3	4	3+1		8+2	2	38+6	6	7		1
21	(Austria)	Louis Schaub	30	2+7	2			3+6	1	5+13	3	4		
22	(Austria)	Yusuf Demir	22	1+7						1+7				1
29	(Ivory Coast)	Romeo Amane	22	32+1	1	3+1		11+1		46+3	1	8		
30	(Austria)	Nicolas Bajlicz	20					0+1		0+1				
Forwards
9	(Austria)	Ercan Kara	29	12+18	6	3+1	1	6+6	1	21+25	8	11		
10	(Norway)	Petter Nosa Dahl	21	16+7	3	1		7	2	24+7	5	5		
15	(Austria)	Nikolaus Wurmbrand	19	25+7	4	2+1		5+5	1	32+13	5	4		
26	(Austria)	Andreas Weimann	33	15+2	1					15+2	1	2		
41	(Austria)	Dominik Weixelbraun	21	1+8		1+2		1+5	1	3+15	1			
43	(Mali)	Moulaye Haïdara	18	0+1						0+1				
49	(Montenegro)	Andrija Radulović	22	6+4	1	1+1		5+3	2	12+8	3	2		
54	(Ghana)	Daniel Nunoo	18	2+3	1					2+3	1	1		
71	(France)	Claudy Mbuyi	26	8+5	3	2		3+6	3	13+11	6	4		
90	(Martinique)	Janis Antiste	22	19+6	3	0+3		8+3	2	27+12	5	3		

=== Goal scorers ===
Name	Bundesliga	Cup	International	Total
(Austria) Ercan Kara	6	1	1	8
(France) Claudy Mbuyi	3		3	6
(Austria) Matthias Seidl	4		2	6
(Martinique) Janis Antiste	3		2	5
(Hungary) Bendegúz Bolla	4	1		5
(Norway) Petter Nosa Dahl	3		2	5
(Austria) Nikolaus Wurmbrand	4		1	5
(Montenegro) Andrija Radulović	1		2	3
(Austria) Louis Schaub	1		1	3
(Austria) Jakob Schöller	3			3
(Serbia) Nenad Cvetković	2			2
(Norway) Tobias Gulliksen		2		2
(Ivory Coast) Romeo Amane	1			1
(Germany) Jannes Horn			1	1
(Ghana) Daniel Nunoo	1			1
(Australia) Marco Tilio	1			1
(Austria) Andreas Weimann	1			1
(Austria) Dominik Weixelbraun			1	1
Own goals
(Belgium) Dimitri Lavalée (Sturm Graz)	1			1
Totals	40	4	16	60

=== Disciplinary record ===
Name	Bundesliga			Cup			International			Total		
Name	Yellow card	(yellow card) (red card)	Red card	Yellow card	(yellow card) (red card)	Red card	Yellow card	(yellow card) (red card)	Red card	Yellow card	(yellow card) (red card)	Red card
(Austria) Ercan Kara	7						4			11		
(Austria) Matthias Seidl	3		1	1			3			7		1
(Ivory Coast) Romeo Amane	7			1						8		
(Turkey) Furkan Demir	5						3			8		
(Germany) Jannes Horn	6						1			7		
(Serbia) Nenad Cvetković	5									5		
(Norway) Petter Nosa Dahl	3						2			5		
(Austria) Lukas Grgić	4						1			5		
(Norway) Tobias Gulliksen	4						1			5		
(Hungary) Bendegúz Bolla	3			1						4		
(France) Claudy Mbuyi	2			1			1			4		
(France) Serge-Philippe Raux-Yao	2						2			4		
(Austria) Louis Schaub	3						1			4		
(Austria) Nikolaus Wurmbrand	3						1			4		
(Martinique) Janis Antiste	3									3		
(Austria) Paul Gartler	3									3		
(Cameroon) Martin Ndzie				2			1			3		
(Mali) Mamadou Sangaré	1			1			1			3		
(Austria) Jakob Schöller			1				1			1		1
(Ivory Coast) Ange Ahoussou	1						1			2		
(Norway) Tobias Børkeeiet	2									2		
(Austria) Niklas Hedl	2									2		
(Montenegro) Andrija Radulović							2			2		
(Australia) Marco Tilio	2									2		
(Austria) Andreas Weimann	2									2		
(Austria) Yusuf Demir			1									1
(Austria) Jonas Auer				1						1		
(Madagascar) Jean Marcelin	1									1		
(Ghana) Daniel Nunoo	1									1		
Totals	75		3	8			26			109		3

== Transfers ==
=== In ===
Pos.	Nat.	Name	Age	Moved from	Type	Transfer Window	Ref.
FW	(France)	Claudy Mbuyi	26	(Austria) St. Pölten	Transfer	Summer	
DF	(Madagascar)	Jean Marcelin	25	(Israel) Beitar Jerusalem	Transfer	Summer	
FW	(Norway)	Petter Nosa Dahl	21	(Belgium) Mechelen	Transfer	Summer	
MF	(Cameroon)	Martin Ndzie	22	(Israel) F.C. Ashdod	Transfer	Summer	
FW	(Australia)	Marco Tilio	24	(Scotland) Celtic	Transfer	Summer	
MF	(Norway)	Tobias Gulliksen	22	(Sweden) Djurgårdens IF	Transfer	Summer	
DF	(Germany)	Jannes Horn	28	(Germany) 1.FC Nürnberg	Free transfer	Summer	
FW	(Austria)	Dominik Weixelbraun	21	(Austria) SKU Amstetten	Free transfer	Summer	
FW	(France)	Janis Antiste	22	(Italy) Sassuolo	Loan	Summer	
MF	(Turkey)	Dennis Kaygin	21	(Netherlands) Willem II	Loan return	Summer	
MF	(Austria)	Oliver Strunz	25	(Austria) FAC	Loan return	Summer	
FW	(Barbados)	Thierry Gale	23	(Poland) Piast Gliwice	Loan return	Summer	
MF	(Austria)	Yusuf Demir	22	(Turkey) Galatasaray	Free transfer	Winter	
FW	(Austria)	Andreas Weimann	34	(England) Derby County	Loan	Winter	

=== Out ===
Pos.	Nat.	Name	Age	Moved to	Type	Transfer Window	Ref.
MF	(Turkey)	Dennis Kaygin	21	(Germany) FC Ingolstadt 04	Transfer	Summer	
FW	(Barbados)	Thierry Gale	23	(England) Bolton Wanderers	Transfer	Summer	
FW	(Sweden)	Isak Jansson	23	(France) OGC Nice	Transfer	Summer	
FW	(Austria)	Jovan Živković	19	(Hungary) Győri ETO	Transfer	Summer	
MF	(Mali)	Mamadou Sangaré	23	(France) RC Lens	Transfer	Summer	
MF	(Austria)	Nicolas Bajlicz	21	(Austria) SV Ried	Transfer	Summer	
DF	(Austria)	Benjamin Böckle	23	(Austria) WSG Tirol	Loan	Summer	
DF	(Austria)	Dominik Vincze	21	(Austria) TSV Hartberg	Loan	Summer	
FW	(France)	Ismaïl Seydi	24	(Portugal) Torreense	Loan	Summer	
FW	(Austria)	Furkan Dursun	20	(Austria) St. Pölten	Loan	Summer	
MF	(Austria)	Moritz Oswald	23	(Austria) SCR Altach	Loan	Summer	
FW	(Croatia)	Dion Drena Beljo	23	(Germany) FC Augsburg	Loan return	Summer	
FW	(Austria)	Guido Burgstaller	36	Retirement	End of contract	Summer	
MF	(Austria)	Roman Kerschbaum	31	Free agent	End of contract	Summer	
FW	(Austria)	Noah Bischof	23	(Netherlands) FC Dordrecht	Transfer	Winter	
FW	(Montenegro)	Andrija Radulović	23	(Israel) Hapoel Haifa	Loan	Winter	

== Pre-season and friendlies ==
Win Draw Loss Fixtures

28 June 2025 Friendly	USV Scheiblingkirchen-Warth	0–5	Rapid	Scheiblingkirchen-Thernberg, Austria
17:00		Report	25' Mbuyi; 44' Stehrer; 69' Strunz; 71' Bajlicz; 90+1' (pen.) Oswald	Stadium: Pittental-Stadion; Attendance: 1,950

5 July 2025 Friendly	Rapid	1–0	SK Artis Brno	Grein, Austria
16:30	Schaub 44'	Report		Stadium: SAR Arena; Attendance: 1,500

12 July 2025 Friendly	Rapid	5–2 (Note: playing time 2x60 minutes)	MŠK Žilina	Hausmening, Austria
16:30	Schaub 10' 20'; Kara 26'; Seydi 92'; Weixelbraun 95'		Iľko 84'; Ďatko 113'	Stadium: Peter Lisec Stadion; Attendance: 1,000

20 July 2025 Friendly	Rapid	1–1	1. FC Union Berlin	Vienna, Austria
16:00	Mbuyi 68'	Report	42' Skarke	Stadium: Allianz Stadion; Attendance: 19,400

5 September 2025 Friendly	Rapid	1–1	Venezia FC	Vienna, Austria
18:00	Weixelbraun 33'		10' Lella	Stadium: Allianz Stadion

9 October 2025 Friendly	Admira Wacker	0–1	Rapid	Maria Enzersdorf, Austria
		Report	60' Tilio	Stadium: Datenpol Arena

12 January 2026 Friendly	Ferencváros	0–1	Rapid	Benidorm, Spain
		Report	51' Seidl

18 January 2026 Friendly	Rapid	0–2	Győri ETO	Vienna, Austria
		Report	42' (o.g.) Raux-Yao; 89' Boldor

24 January 2026 Friendly	Rapid	1–0	First Vienna	Vienna, Austria
11:00	Music 78'	Report		Stadium: ÖFB Campus

24 January 2026 Friendly	Rapid	5–2	NŠ Mura	Vienna, Austria
15:00	Cvetković 15'; Bolla 41'; Seidl 55'; Kara 65'; Wurmbrand 88'	Report	48' Antolin; 60' Kurtović	Stadium: ÖFB Campus

25 March 2026 Friendly	SC Neusiedl/See	3–4	Rapid	Neusiedl am See, Austria
	Demitra 31'; Strommer 69'; Missi Tomp 84'	Report	23' Szladits; 37' 75' Kara; 90+3' Djezic	Stadium: Sportzentrum Neusiedl

== Competitions ==
=== Overall record ===
Competition	First match	Last match	Starting round	Final position	Record							
Competition	First match	Last match	Starting round	Final position	Pld	W	D	L	GF	GA	GD	Win %
Austrian Football Bundesliga	3 August	25 May		5th	34	13	8	13	40	43	−3	38.24
Austrian Cup	27 July	31 January	Round 1	Quarterfinals	4	3		1	4	4	+0	75.00
Conference League	24 July	18 December	Second qualifying round	League phase, 36th	12	3	3	6	16	22	−6	25.00
Total					50	19	11	20	60	69	−9	38.00

Source: Soccerway

=== Austrian Football Bundesliga ===
==== Results summary ====
Overall								Home						Away					
Pld	W	D	L	GF	GA	GD	Pts	W	D	L	GF	GA	GD	W	D	L	GF	GA	GD
34	13	8	13	40	43	−3	47	8	2	7	22	20	+2	5	6	6	18	23	−5

Source: Austrian Football Bundesliga

==== Results by round ====
Round	1	2	3	4	5	6	7	8	9	10	11	12	13	14	15	16	17	18	19	20	21	22	23	24	25	26	27	28	29	30	31	32
Ground	H	A	H	A	A	H	A	H	A	H	A	H	A	H	A	H	A	H	A	H	A	H	A	H	H	A	A	H	H	A	H	A
Result	W	W	D	W	W	W	D	L	L	L	W	W	D	L	L	L	D	D	L	W	D	W	W	W	L	D	D	L	W	L	L	L
Position	4	3	2	2	1	1	1	1	3	3	3	2	2	2	4	4	7	6	7	6	6	5	3	2	3	3	4	4	4	4	5	5

Source: Austrian Football Bundesliga
A = Away; H = Home; W = Win; D = Draw; L = Loss

==== Regular season ====
===== Table =====
Pos	Team	Pld	W	D	L	GF	GA	GD	Pts	Qualification
3	LASK	22	11	4	7	32	30	+2	37	Qualification for the Championship round
4	Austria Wien	22	11	3	8	34	30	+4	36	Qualification for the Championship round
5	SK Rapid	22	9	6	7	26	25	+1	33	Qualification for the Championship round
6	TSV Hartberg	22	8	9	5	29	24	+5	33	Qualification for the Championship round
7	WSG Tirol	22	8	7	7	31	30	+1	31	Qualification for the Relegation round

Source: Austrian Football Bundesliga
Rules for classification: 1) Points; 2) Head-to-head record; 3) Goal difference; 4) Goals scored; 5) Matches won; 6) Away matches won; 7) Away goals scored.

===== Matches =====
3 August 2025 1	Rapid	1–0	BW Linz	Vienna
17:00	Dahl 8'	Report		Stadium: Allianz Stadion; Attendance: 21,200; Referee: Markus Hameter

10 August 2025 2	Sturm	1–2	Rapid	Graz
17:00	Marcelin 57' (o.g.)	Report	67' Dahl; 70' Mbuyi	Stadium: Liebenauer Stadium; Attendance: 16,250; Referee: Peter Altmann

17 August 2025 3	Rapid	0–0	Altach	Vienna
17:00	Kara (penalty missed) 90'+2	Report		Stadium: Allianz Stadion; Attendance: 19,700; Referee: Christian Petru-Ciochirca

24 August 2025 4	Wolfsberg	1–2	Rapid	Wolfsberg
17:00	Zukić 70' (pen.)	Report	10' 41' Wurmbrand	Stadium: Lavanttal-Arena; Attendance: 6,700; Referee: Anes Talic

31 August 2025 5	Hartberg	0–1	Rapid	Maria Enzersdorf
17:00		Report	82' Kara	Stadium: Datenpol Arena (Note: Hartberg played home games in Maria Enzersdorf during renovation of their usual home ground.); Attendance: 5,000; Referee: Daniel Pfister

14 September 2025 6	Rapid	4–1	WSG Tirol	Vienna
14:30	Wurmbrand 21'; Mbuyi 45'; Cvetković 75'; Tilio 90+1'	Report	53' Böckle	Stadium: Allianz Stadion; Attendance: 20,222; Referee: Christopher Jäger

21 September 2025 7	GAK	1–1	Rapid	Graz
17:00	Maderner 90+4' (pen.)	Report	22' Antiste	Stadium: Liebenauer Stadium; Attendance: 7,482; Referee: Harald Lechner

28 September 2025 8	Rapid	1–3	Austria	Vienna
17:00	Mbuyi 48' (pen.)	Report	25' Lee T.; 50' Barry; 59' Botic; (red card) 73' Wiesinger	Stadium: Allianz Stadion; Attendance: 26,000; Referee: Walter Altmann

5 October 2025 9	RB Salzburg	2–1	Rapid	Salzburg
17:00	Diabate 38'; Kitano 57'	Report	45' Radulović; (penalty missed) 82' Seidl	Stadium: Red Bull Arena; Attendance: 12,793; Referee: Jakob Semler

19 October 2025 10	Rapid	0–2	LASK	Vienna
17:00	Mbuyi (penalty missed) 90'+6	Report	12' Usor; 42' Adeniran	Stadium: Allianz Stadion; Attendance: 23,337; Referee: Alexander Harkam

26 October 2025 11	Ried	0–2	Rapid	Ried im Innkreis
14:30		Report	17' Wurmbrand; 34' Kara	Stadium: Innviertel Arena; Attendance: 7,000; Referee: Arnes Talic

2 November 2025 12	Rapid	2–1	Sturm	Vienna
17:00	Seidl 66'; Lavalée 75' (o.g.)	Report	39' Malone	Stadium: Allianz Stadion; Attendance: 24,800; Referee: Markus Hameter

9 November 2025 13	WSG Tirol	1–1	Rapid	Innsbruck
14:30	Baden 7'	Report	73' Kara	Stadium: Tivoli Stadion Tirol; Attendance: 4,450; Referee: Florian Jäger

23 November 2025 14	Rapid	1–2	GAK	Vienna
17:00	Kara 74'	Report	67' (pen.) Maderner; 84' Harakaté	Stadium: Allianz Stadion; Attendance: 19,124; Referee: Stefan Ebner

30 November 2025 15	LASK	3–0	Rapid	Linz
17:00	Jørgensen 45+13'; Usor 55'; Lang 83'	Report		Stadium: Raiffeisen Arena; Attendance: 16,263; Referee: Arnes Talic

6 December 2025 16	Rapid	1–2	Ried	Vienna
17:00	Schaub 32'	Report	41' Steurer; 55' Pomer	Stadium: Allianz Stadion; Attendance: 13,537; Referee: Sebastian Gishamer

14 December 2025 17	BW Linz	1–1	Rapid	Linz
14:30	Cvetko 29'	Report	16' Cvetković	Stadium: Donauparkstadion; Attendance: 5,600; Referee: Achim Untergasser

7 February 2026 18	Rapid	1–1	Hartberg	Vienna
17:00	Bolla 70'	Report	15' Hoffmann	Stadium: Allianz Stadion; Attendance: 16,690; Referee: Walter Altmann

15 February 2026 19	Austria	2–0	Rapid	Vienna
17:00	Eggestein 15'; Ranftl 35'	Report		Stadium: Franz Horr Stadium; Attendance: 15,600; Referee: Markus Hameter

21 February 2026 20	Rapid	2–0	Wolfsberg	Vienna
17:00	Seidl 73'; Nunoo 90+2'	Report		Stadium: Allianz Stadion; Attendance: 10,400; Referee: Stefan Ebner

1 March 2026 21	Altach	1–1	Rapid	Altach
17:00	Massombo 86'	Report	51' Weimann; (red card) 90' Schöller	Stadium: Stadion Schnabelholz; Attendance: 7,100; Referee: Christian-Petru Ciochirca

8 March 2026 22	Rapid	1–0	RB Salzburg	Vienna
17:00	Antiste 38'	Report		Stadium: Allianz Stadion; Attendance: 14,570 (Note: reduced capacity due to sanctions); Referee: Harald Lechner

==== Championship round ====
===== Table =====
Pos	Team	Pld	W	D	L	GF	GA	GD	Pts	Qualification	LSK	STU	RBS	AWI	RWI	HAR
2	Sturm Graz	32	16	8	8	51	35	+16	37	Qualification for the Champions League second qualifying round	1–1	—	1–1	1–1	2–0	0–0
3	Red Bull Salzburg	32	13	9	10	56	41	+15	29	Qualification for the Europa League third qualifying round (Note: The 2025–26 Austrian Cup winners (LASK) qualified for the Europa League third qualifying round. Since LASK finished as league champions, the Europa League berth went to the third place team.)	2–3	1–1	—	3–1	0–1	1–3
4	Austria Wien	32	14	5	13	45	50	−5	29	Qualification for the Conference League second qualifying round	0–3	2–5	1–3	—	1–1	1–0
5	SK Rapid (O)	32	12	8	12	36	41	−5	27	Qualification for the Conference League play-offs	4–2	0–2	1–0	0–2	—	0–2
6	Hartberg	32	10	12	10	40	40	0	25		1–5	2–4	1–2	0–1	2–2	—

Source: Austrian Football Bundesliga
Legend: Blue = home team win; Yellow = draw; Red = away team win.
Rules for classification: 1) Points; 2) Points with (possible) half points subtracted due to rounding; 3) Head-to-head points; 4) Head-to-head goal difference; 5) Head-to-head goals scored; 6) Goal difference; 7) Goals scored; 8) Matches won; 9) Away matches won; 10) Away goals scored.
(O) Play-off winners

===== Matches =====
15 March 2026 23	RB Salzburg	0–1	Rapid	Wals-Siezenheim
14:30	Gadou (red card) 67'	Report	69' Seidl	Stadium: Red Bull Arena; Attendance: 10,000; Referee: Markus Hameter

22 March 2026 24	Rapid	4–2	LASK	Vienna
17:00	Schöller 3'; Bolla 32' 65' (pen.); Seidl 85'	Report	1' Adeniran; 79' Usor	Stadium: Allianz Stadion; Attendance: 13,600 (Note: reduced capacity due to sanctions); Referee: Anes Talic

5 April 2026 25	Rapid	0–2	Sturm	Vienna
17:00		Report	13' Vallci; 52' Jatta	Stadium: Allianz Stadion; Attendance: 16,100; Referee: Sebastian Gishamer

12 April 2026 26	Austria Wien	1–1	Rapid	Vienna
17:00	Boateng 34'	Report	83' Kara	Stadium: Generali Arena; Attendance: 14,150; Referee: Harald Lechner

19 April 2026 27	Hartberg	2–2	Rapid	Hartberg
14:30	Spendlhofer 45'; Pazourek 52'	Report	47' Bolla; 68' Dahl	Stadium: Profertil Arena; Attendance: 4,200; Referee: Julian Weinberger

22 April 2026 28	Rapid	0–2	Hartberg	Vienna
18:30		Report	34' Heil; 82' Havel	Stadium: Allianz Stadion; Attendance: 18,400; Referee: Stefan Ebner

26 April 2026 29	Rapid	1–0	RB Salzburg	Vienna
14:30	Kara 88'	Report		Stadium: Allianz Stadion; Attendance: 24,200; Referee: Christian-Petru Ciochirca

3 May 2026 30	LASK	3–1	Rapid	Linz
14:30	Horvath 52'; Adeniran 63'; Usor 75'	Report	12' Antiste; (red card) 90+7' Seidl	Stadium: Raiffeisen Arena; Attendance: 16,289; Referee: Alexander Harkam

10 May 2026 31	Rapid	0–2	Austria Wien	Vienna
17:00		Report	9' Saljic; 60' (o.g.) Raux-Yao	Stadium: Allianz Stadion; Attendance: 25,522; Referee: Julian Weinberger

17 May 2026 32	Sturm	2–0	Rapid	Graz
17:00	Mamageishvili 88'; Hierländer 90+1'	Report		Stadium: Merkur Arena; Attendance: 15,200; Referee: Harald Lechner

==== Conference League play-offs ====
===== Finals =====
22 May 2026	Ried	2–1	Rapid	Ried im Innkreis
19:30	Havenaar 14'; Boguo 77'	Report	75' Amane	Stadium: BWT X Upper Austrian Arena; Attendance: 4,638; Referee: Walter Altmann

25 May 2026	Rapid	3–0 (4–2 agg.)	Ried	Vienna
17:00	Schöller 27' 66'; Schaub 90+2'			Stadium: Allianz Stadion; Attendance: 14,604; Referee: Christian-Petru Ciochirca

=== Austrian Cup ===
27 July 2025 1st round	Wacker Innsbruck	0–1	Rapid	Innsbruck
17:00		Report	78' Bolla	Stadium: Tivoli Stadion Tirol; Attendance: 15,753; Referee: Stefan Macanovic

17 September 2025 2nd round	SV Oberwart	1–2	Rapid	Oberwart
19:00	Ried 55' (pen.)	Report	20' 45+1' Gulliksen	Stadium: Inform-Stadion; Attendance: 6,000; Referee: Dr. Julian Schnur

29 October 2025 Round of 16	SKN St. Pölten	0–1	Rapid	St. Pölten
20:30		Report	30' Kara	Stadium: NV Arena; Attendance: 8,000; Referee: Jakob Semler

31 January 2026 Quarterfinal	SV Ried	3–0	Rapid	Ried im Innkreis
17:30	Bajic 2'; Havenaar 61' 84'	Report		Stadium: Innviertel Arena; Attendance: 6,920; Referee: Alexander Harkam

=== UEFA Conference League ===
==== Second qualifying round ====
24 July 2025 First leg	Dečić (Montenegro)	0–2	Rapid	Tuzi, Montenegro
21:00		Report	17' Horn; 40' (pen.) Seidl	Stadium: Stadion Tuško Polje; Referee: Kadir Sağlam (Turkey)

31 July 2025 Second leg	Rapid	4–2 (6–2 agg.)	(Montenegro) Dečić	Vienna, Austria
20:30	Dahl 17'; Radulović 27'; Weixelbraun 68'; Mbuyi 71'	Report	60' Striković; 82' Sekulović	Stadium: Weststadion; Attendance: 16,217; Referee: Dumitru Muntean (Moldova)

==== Third qualifying round ====
7 August 2025 First leg	Rapid	2–2	(Scotland) Dundee United	Vienna, Austria
21:00	Dahl 27'; Seidl 44'	Report	34' Watters; 75' Sapsford	Stadium: Weststadion; Attendance: 18,930; Referee: Luis Godinho (Portugal)

14 August 2025 Second leg	Dundee United (Scotland)	2–2 (a.e.t.) (4–4 agg.) (4–5 p)	Rapid	Dundee, Scotland
19:45	Watters 25' 42' (pen.)	Report	63' Antiste; 78' Kara	Stadium: Tannadice Park; Attendance: 14,200; Referee: Anastasios Sidiropoulos (Greece)
	Penalties
	Fatah (penalty missed); Ferry (penalty scored); Esselink (penalty scored); Ševelj (penalty scored); Keresztes (penalty scored)		(penalty scored) Kara; (penalty scored) Mbuyi; (penalty scored) Radulović; (penalty scored) Raux-Yao; (penalty scored) Bolla

==== Play-off round ====
21 August 2025 First leg	Győri ETO (Hungary)	2–1	Rapid	Győr, Hungary
19:00	Gavrić 46' 82'	Report	61' Wurmbrand	Stadium: ETO Park; Attendance: 8,055; Referee: Igor Stojchevski (North Macedonia)

28 August 2025 Second leg	Rapid	2–0 (3–2 agg.)	(Hungary) Győri ETO	Vienna, Austria
19:00	Mbuyi 7' 81'	Report		Stadium: Weststadion; Attendance: 22,300; Referee: Manfredas Lukjančukas (Lithuania)

==== League phase ====
Pos	Team	Pld	W	D	L	GF	GA	GD	Pts
32	(Swedish Football Association) BK Häcken	6	0	3	3	5	8	−3	3
33	(Malta Football Association) Hamrun Spartans	6	1	0	5	4	11	−7	3
34	(Football Association of Ireland) Shelbourne	6	0	2	4	0	7	−7	2
35	(Scottish Football Association) Aberdeen	6	0	2	4	3	14	−11	2
36	(Austrian Football Association) Rapid Wien	6	0	1	5	3	14	−11	1

Source: UEFA
Rules for classification: League phase tiebreakers

2 October 2025 1	Lech Poznań (Poland)	4–1	Rapid	Poznań, Poland
18:45	Palma 13'; Ishak 21' (penalty missed); Ismaheel 45+2'; Bengtsson 77'	Report	64' Radulović	Stadium: Poznań Stadium; Attendance: 24,779; Referee: Rob Hennessy (Republic of Ireland)

23 October 2025 2	Rapid	0–3	(Italy) Fiorentina	Vienna, Austria
18:45		Report	9' Ndour; 48' Džeko; 88' Gudmundsson	Stadium: Weststadion; Attendance: 24,641; Referee: Frid Yigal (Israel)

6 November 2025 3	Rapid	0–1	(Romania) Universitatea Craiova	Vienna, Austria
21:00		Report	37' Romanchuk	Stadium: Weststadion; Attendance: 23,457; Referee: Martin Matoša (Slovenia)

27 November 2025 4	Raków Częstochowa (Poland)	4–1	Rapid	Sosnowiec, Poland
18:45	Brunes 27' (pen.); Diaby-Fadiga 40' 51' 53'	Report	75' Antiste	Stadium: Zagłębie Sports Park; Attendance: 11,000; Referee: Duje Strukan (Croatia)

11 December 2025 5	Rapid	0–1	(Cyprus) Omonia	Vienna, Austria
21:00		Report	Neophytou 19'	Stadium: Weststadion; Attendance: 17,114; Referee: Joey Kooij (Netherlands)

18 December 2025 6	Zrinjski Mostar (Bosnia and Herzegovina)	1–1	Rapid	Mostar, Bosnia and Herzegovina
21:00	Cvetković 90+3' (e.g.)	Report	11' Schaub	Stadium: Stadion pod Bijelim Brijegom; Referee: Ishmael Barbara (Malta)
