= Andrija Radulović (footballer) =

Serbian association football player

Personal information
- Date of birth: 3 July 2002 (age 24)
- Place of birth: Kotor, Montenegro, FR Yugoslavia
- Height: 1.80 m (5 ft 11 in)
- Position: Attacking midfielder

Team information
- Current team: TSV Hartberg (on loan from Rapid Wien)
- Number: 49

Senior career*
Years	Team	Apps	(Gls)
2020–2023	Red Star Belgrade	11	(1)
2021	→ Grafičar Beograd (loan)	18	(6)
2022	→ Mladost Novi Sad (loan)	17	(4)
2023	→ Radnik Surdulica (loan)	20	(6)
2023–2025	Vojvodina	50	(10)
2025	→ Rapid Wien (loan)	13	(3)
2025–	Rapid Wien	10	(1)
2026	→ Hapoel Haifa (loan)	4	(0)
2026–	→ TSV Hartberg (loan)	0	(0)

International career^{‡}
2018	Serbia U17	7	(0)
2021	Serbia U20	1	(1)
2022–2024	Montenegro U21	7	(2)
2023–	Montenegro	7	(0)
- * Club domestic league appearances and goals as of 7 September 2026 ‡ National team caps and goals as of 9 June 2025

Andrija Radulović (Montenegrin Cyrillic: Андрија Радуловић, born 3 July 2002) is a Montenegrin professional footballer who plays as a midfielder for Austrian Bundesliga club TSV Hartberg, on loan from Rapid Wien, and the Montenegro national team.

== Early life ==
Radulović was born on 3 July 2002 in Kotor, Montenegro, then a part of Yugoslavia. He is an admirer of Portuguese footballer Cristiano Ronaldo.

== Career ==
On 7 July 2023, Radulović signed a three-year contract with Vojvodina. On 6 February 2025, he moved to Austrian club Rapid Wien on loan.

In a 2022 interview with Radio and Television of Montenegro, Radulović revealed that he accepted a call-up to the Serbian youth national teams after coach of Montenegro excluded him from his plans. However, the same year on 26 September, he scored twice in a 2023 UEFA European Under-21 Championship qualification against Malta U21 – ending in a 6–0 victory for the Montengrins.

On 20 June 2023, Radulović debuted for the Montenegro senior team in a 4–1 friendly loss against the Czech Republic. He was not included in the 2026 FIFA World Cup qualification matches due to disagreements with coach Robert Prosinečki.

== Style of play ==
Radulović is a midfielder with low centre of gravity and willingness to show off his skills.

== Career statistics ==
=== Club ===
As of 9 November 2025

Club	Season	League			Cup		Continental		Other		Total	
Club	Season	Division	Apps	Goals	Apps	Goals	Apps	Goals	Apps	Goals	Apps	Goals
Red Star Belgrade	2019–20	Serbian SuperLiga	3	1	1	0	0	0	0	0	4	1
Red Star Belgrade	2020–21	Serbian SuperLiga	6	0	2	1	1	0	0	0	9	1
Red Star Belgrade	2021–22	Serbian SuperLiga	2	0	1	0	0	0	0	0	3	0
Red Star Belgrade	Total		11	1	4	1	1	0	0	0	16	2
Grafičar Beograd (loan)	2021–22	Serbian First League	18	6	0	0	0	0	0	0	18	6
Mladost Novi Sad (loan)	2022–23	Serbian SuperLiga	17	4	1	0	—		—		18	4
Radnik Surdulica (loan)	2022–23	Serbian SuperLiga	20	6	1	0	—		—		21	6
Vojvodina	2023–24	Serbian SuperLiga	33	7	4	0	2	0	—		39	7
Vojvodina	2024–25	Serbian SuperLiga	17	3	2	0	2	0	—		21	3
Vojvodina	Total		50	10	6	0	4	0	—		60	10
Rapid Wien	2024–25	Austrian Bundesliga	13	3	—		3	0	—		16	3
Rapid Wien	2025–26	Austrian Bundesliga	10	0	1	0	7	2	—		18	2
Rapid Wien	Total		23	3	1	0	10	2	—		34	5
Career total			139	30	13	1	15	2	—		167	33

=== International ===
As of match played 9 June 2025

Appearances and goals by national team and year
National team	Year	Apps	Goals
Montenegro	2023	3	0
Montenegro	2024	2	0
Montenegro	2025	2	0
Total		7	0

== Honours ==
Red Star Belgrade

- Serbian SuperLiga: 2019–20, 2020–21, 2021–22
- Serbian Cup: 2020–21, 2021–22

Individual

- Serbian SuperLiga Player of the Week: 2023–24 (Round 35)
