= Claudy Mbuyi =

Congolese footballer (born 1999

Personal information
- Full name: Claudy Mbuyi Kabamba
- Date of birth: 3 June 1999 (age 27)
- Place of birth: Kinshasa, Democratic Republic of Congo
- Height: 1.85 m (6 ft 1 in)
- Position: Forward

Team information
- Current team: Rapid Wien
- Number: 71

Youth career
- Laval

Senior career*
Years	Team	Apps	(Gls)
2017–2019	Laval	0	(0)
2018–2019	→ Laval B (loan)	8	(0)
2019–2022	Jura Sud	51	(15)
2022–2024	Villefranche	47	(7)
2024–2025	SKN St. Pölten	24	(21)
2025–	Rapid Wien	16	(4)
- * Club domestic league appearances and goals as of 24 October 2026

Claudy Mbuyi Kabamba (born 3 June 1999) is a DR Congolese professional footballer who plays as a forward for Austrian Bundesliga club Rapid Wien.

== Early life ==
Mbuyi was born on 3 June 1999. Born in Kinshasa, Democratic Republic of Congo, he is a native of the city.

== Club career ==
As a youth player, Mbuyi joined the youth academy of French side Laval and was promoted to the club's senior team in 2017, where he failed to make an appearance. In 2019, he signed for French Championnat National 2 (fourth tier) side Jura Sud.

Mbuyi signed with French Championnat National side Villefranche on July 20, 2022. Where he made forty-seven league appearances and scored seven goals. Following his stint there, he signed for Austrian 2. Liga side SKN St. Pölten in July 12, 2024, where he made twenty-four league appearances and scored twenty-one goals, finishing the season as the league's top scorer. Mbuyi joined Austrian Bundesliga club Rapid Wien on 15 June 2025 on a 3-year contract. On 28 August 2025, Mbuyi scored two goals against Győri ETO in the second leg of the UEFA Conference League qualification play-off, helping his team advance to the group stage.

== Style of play ==
Mbuyi plays as a forward and is right-footed. Speaking to French news website Foot Mercato in 2025, he said "I'm a deep-lying striker, I like to run and play with my back to goal. "All things considered, I like to take Victor Osimhen or Didier Drogba as examples. I try to draw on their qualities".

== Career statistics ==
As of match played 27 October 2026

Appearances and goals by club, season and competition
Club	Season	League			National cup		League Cup		Europe		Total	
Club	Season	Division	Apps	Goals	Apps	Goals	Apps	Goals	Apps	Goals	Apps	Goals
Laval	2017–18	CFA	0	0	1	0	1	0	—		2	0
Laval (loan)	2018–19	National 3	8	0	—		—		—		8	0
Jura Sud	2019–20	CFA 2	19	2	0	0	—		—		19	2
Jura Sud	2020–21	CFA 2	6	0	1	0	—		—		7	0
Jura Sud	2021–22	CFA 2	26	13	5	4	—		—		31	17
Jura Sud	Total		51	15	6	4	—		—		57	19
Villefranche	2022–23	CFA	19	4	3	1	—		—		22	5
Villefranche	2023–24	CFA	28	3	1	1	—		—		29	4
Villefranche	Total		47	7	4	2	—		—		51	9
SKN	2024–25	2. Liga	24	21	2	2	—		—		26	23
Rapid Wien	2025–26	Austrian Bundesliga	13	3	2	0	—		8 (Note: Appearances in UEFA Conference League)	3	23	6
Rapid Wien	2026–27	Austrian Bundesliga	3	1	1	2	—		0	0	4	3
Rapid Wien	Total		16	4	3	2	—		8	0	27	9
Career total			146	47	16	10	1	0	8	3	172	60
