= Furkan Demir =

Turkish footballer (born 2004)

Personal information
- Date of birth: 29 November 2004 (age 21)
- Place of birth: Vienna, Austria
- Height: 1.70 m (5 ft 7 in)
- Position: Right-back

Team information
- Current team: Rapid Wien
- Number: 61

Youth career
- 2010–2013: First Vienna FC
- 2013–2022: Rapid Wien

Senior career*
Years	Team	Apps	(Gls)
2022–2024	Rapid Wien II	39	(3)
2024–	Rapid Wien	14	(0)
2024–2025	→ TSV Hartberg (loan)	24	(0)

International career^{‡}
2024	Turkey U20	4	(0)
2024–	Turkey U21	7	(0)
- * Club domestic league appearances and goals as of 19:03, 22 March 2026 (UTC) ‡ National team caps and goals as of 21:05, 14 October 2025 (UTC)

Furkan Demir (born 29 November 2004) is a professional footballer who plays as a right-back for Austrian Football Bundesliga club Rapid Wien. Born in Austria, he is a youth international for Turkey.

== Club career ==
A youth product of First Vienna FC, Demir joined the youth academy of Rapid Wien in 2013. On 20 May 2022, he signed his first professional contract with Rapid Wien until 2024, and was promoted to their reserves in the 2. Liga. On 22 May 2024, he extended his contract with Rapid Wien until 2026. On 5 September 2024, he was loaned out TSV Hartberg in the Austrian Football Bundesliga for the 2024–25 season. He made his senior and professional debut with Hartberg in a 2–2 Austrian Bundesliga tie with Austria Klagenfurt on 21 September 2024.

== International career ==
Born in Austria, he is a youth international for Turkey. He was called up to the Turkey U21s in June 2025.

== Personal life ==
Furkan is the younger brother of the Austrian international footballer Yusuf Demir.

== Career statistics ==
As of match played 27 October 2026

Appearances and goals by club, season and competition
Club	Season	League			Cup (Note: Includes Austrian Cup)		Europe		Total	
Club	Season	Division	Apps	Goals	Apps	Goals	Apps	Goals	Apps	Goals
Rapid Wien II	2022–23	2. Liga	10	1	—		—		10	1
Rapid Wien II	2023–24	Austrian Regionalliga East	27	2	—		—		27	2
Rapid Wien II	2024–25	2. Liga	2	0	—		—		2	0
Rapid Wien II	Total		39	3	—		—		39	3
TSV Hartberg (loan)	2024–25	Austrian Bundesliga	28	1	4	0	—		32	1
Rapid Wien	2025–26	Austrian Bundesliga	14	0	2	0	8 (Note: Appearances in UEFA Conference League)	0	24	0
Rapid Wien	2026–27	Austrian Bundesliga	0	0	3	0	0	0	3	0
Rapid Wien	Total		14	0	5	0	8	0	27	0
Career total			81	4	9	0	8	0	98	4
