= Yusuf Demir =

Austrian footballer (born 2003)

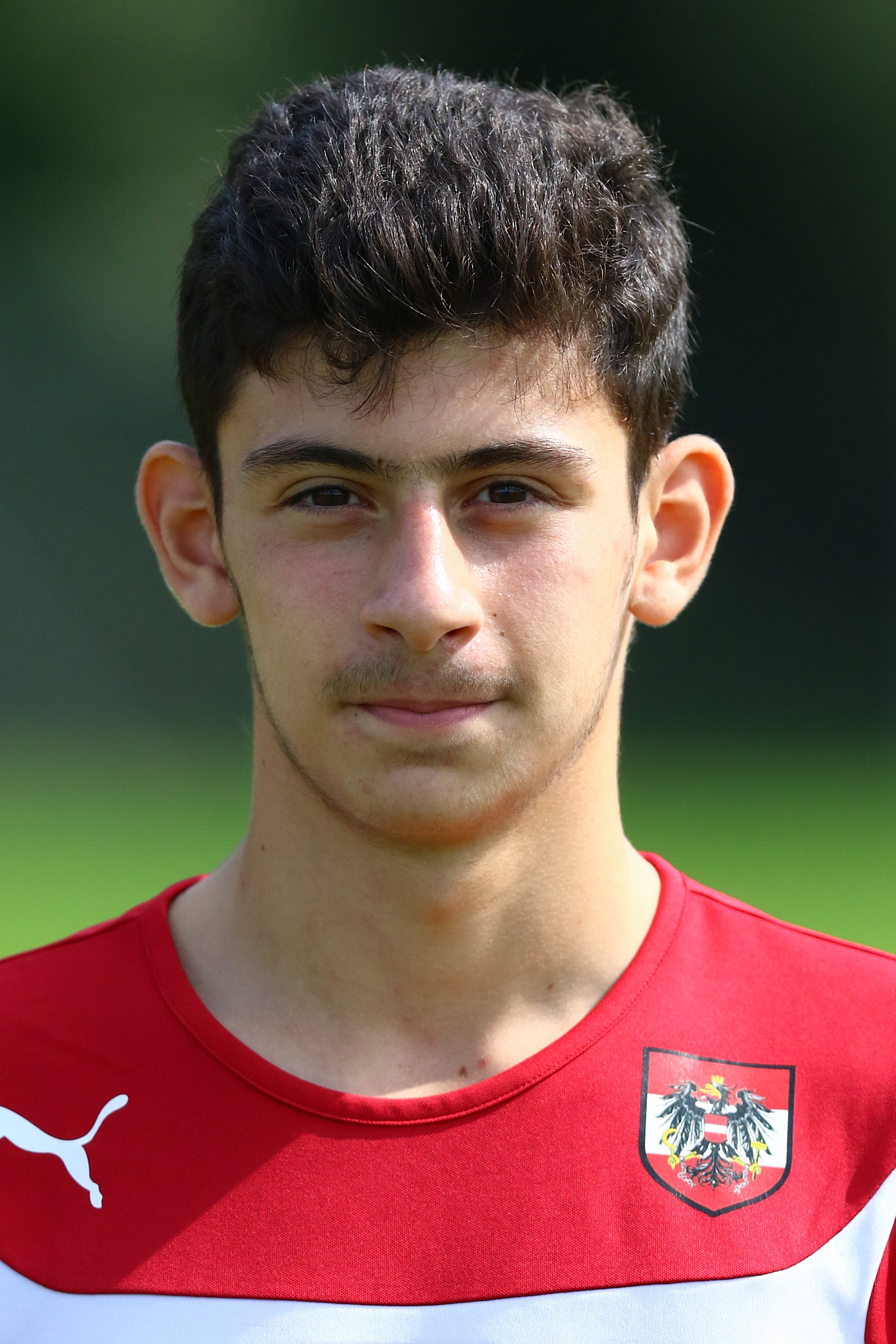
- Demir with Austria U17 in 2018

Personal information
- Full name: Yusuf Demir
- Date of birth: 2 June 2003 (age 23)
- Place of birth: Vienna, Austria
- Height: 1.73 m (5 ft 8 in)
- Position: Right winger

Team information
- Current team: Rapid Wien
- Number: 22

Youth career
- 2010–2013: First Vienna
- 2013–2019: Rapid Wien

Senior career*
Years	Team	Apps	(Gls)
2019–2020	Rapid Wien II	11	(1)
2019–2022	Rapid Wien	43	(8)
2021–2022	→ Barcelona (loan)	6	(0)
2022–2026	Galatasaray	14	(0)
2023–2024	→ Basel (loan)	11	(0)
2026–	Rapid Wien	17	(4)

International career
2018	Austria U15	5	(5)
2018–2019	Austria U17	14	(9)
2022	Austria U19	4	(1)
2020–2024	Austria U21	18	(3)
2021	Austria	4	(0)
- * Club domestic league appearances and goals as of 21:30, 24 October 2026 (UTC)

Yusuf Demir (Turkish: [juˈsuf deˈmiɾ]; born 2 June 2003) is an Austrian professional footballer who plays as a right winger for Austrian Bundesliga club Rapid Wien.

== Club career ==
=== Early life ===
Yusuf Demir was born on 2 June 2003, in Vienna, Austria, to Turkish parents, with his family roots in Trabzon, Turkey.

=== Rapid Wien ===
On 26 May 2019, Demir signed a professional contract with Rapid Wien. Demir made his professional debut with Rapid Wien in a 3–0 league win over Admira on 14 December 2019. On 15 September 2020, Demir scored a goal for Rapid Wien in 2–1 defeat against Gent in the UEFA Champions League third qualifying round, at 17 years, three months and 13 days old, to become the youngest Austrian scorer since Gerd Wimmer in 1994, aged 17 years, ten months and 27 days.

=== Barcelona ===
In July 2021, Barcelona announced the signing of Demir on a season-long loan from Rapid Wien for €500,000, with an option to make the move permanent in the future for a further €10 million, but if the player reached ten appearances the club would be obligated to activate it.

On 23 August 2021, Demir made his competitive debut against Athletic Bilbao. He came on as a replacement for Martin Braithwaite after 61 minutes, becoming Barça's youngest foreign debutant since Lionel Messi (aged 17 years and 114 days) who did so in 2004.

On 31 August 2021, Demir was registered by Barcelona to play in La Liga as a first-team player after he was previously set to be registered in the reserves. He was handed the number 11 jersey that was previously held by Ousmane Dembélé.

On 13 January 2022, the loan was terminated, and Demir returned to Austria.

=== Galatasaray ===
On 8 September 2022, he signed a four-year contract with Galatasaray, for a reported transfer fee of €6 million.

Demir became the champion in the Süper Lig in the 2022–23 season with the Galatasaray team. Defeating Ankaragücü 4–1 away in the match played in the 36th week on 30 May 2023, Galatasaray secured the lead with two weeks before the end and won the 23rd championship in its history.

=== Basel (loan) ===
In the statement made by Galatasaray on 16 August 2023, it was announced that Demir was sent on a year-long loan to Swiss team Basel. Basel confirmed the deal the same evening. He joined Basel's first team for their 2023–24 season under head coach Timo Schultz. Demir played his domestic league debut for the club in the home game in the St. Jakob-Park on 3 September as Basel played a 2–2 draw with Zürich. He scored his first goal for his new team in the Swiss Cup second round away game on 16 September. He scored the team's third goal in the 33rd minute, as Basel went on to win 8–0 against amateur club FC Bosporus, to qualify for the next round. Demir was forced to watch the team's last five league games in that calendar year from the sidelines, due to a torn muscle fiber in his calf, suffered during Austria's U-21 0–0 draw against North Macedonia U-21 mid November.

=== Rapid Wien (return) ===
On 5 February 2026, Demir returned to his former club Rapid Wien on a permanent deal, signing a two-and-a-half year deal.

== International career ==
Demir was a youth international for Austria. He debuted for the senior Austria national team in a 3–1 2022 FIFA World Cup qualification win over the Faroe Islands on 28 March 2021.

== Personal life ==
Yusuf is the older brother of the Turkish youth international footballer Furkan Demir.

== Career statistics ==
=== Club ===
As of match played 27 October 2026

Appearances and goals by club, season and competition
Club	Season	League			National cup (Note: Includes Austrian Cup, Turkish Cup, Swiss Cup)		Europe		Other		Total	
Club	Season	Division	Apps	Goals	Apps	Goals	Apps	Goals	Apps	Goals	Apps	Goals
Rapid Wien II	2018–19	Austrian Regionalliga East	2	0	—		—		—		2	0
Rapid Wien II	2019–20	Austrian Regionalliga East	9	1	—		—		—		9	1
Rapid Wien II	Total		11	1	—		—		—		11	1
Rapid Wien	2019–20	Austrian Bundesliga	6	0	0	0	—		—		6	0
Rapid Wien	2020–21	Austrian Bundesliga	25	6	2	1	5 (Note: One appearance and one goal in UEFA Champions League, four appearances and one goal in UEFA Europa League)	2	—		32	9
Rapid Wien	2021–22	Austrian Bundesliga	11	1	1	0	2 (Note: Appearances in UEFA Conference League)	0	—		14	1
Rapid Wien	Total		42	7	3	1	7	2	—		52	10
Barcelona (loan)	2021–22	La Liga	6	0	0	0	3 (Note: Appearances in UEFA Champions League)	0	—		9	0
Galatasaray	2022–23	Süper Lig	5	0	1	0	—		—		6	0
Galatasaray	2024–25	Süper Lig	8	0	4	2	5 (Note: Appearances in UEFA Europa League)	0	—		17	2
Galatasaray	2025–26	Süper Lig	1	0	2	0	0	0	0	0	3	0
Galatasaray	Total		14	0	7	2	5	0	0	0	26	2
Basel (loan)	2023–24	Swiss Super League	11	0	2	1	0	0	0	0	13	1
Rapid Wien	2025–26	Austrian Bundesliga	7	0	—		—		—		7	0
Rapid Wien	2026–27	Austrian Bundesliga	10	4	2	1	5	1	—		17	6
Rapid Wien	Total		17	4	2	1	5	1	—		24	6
Career total			101	12	14	5	20	3	0	0	135	20

=== International ===
Appearances and goals by national team and year
National team	Year	Apps	Goals
Austria	2021	4	0
Total		4	0

== Honours ==
Galatasaray

- Süper Lig: 2022–23, 2024–25
- Turkish Cup: 2024–25
