= Jakob Schöller =

Austrian footballer

Personal information
- Full name: Jakob Maximilian Schöller
- Date of birth: 9 December 2005 (age 20)
- Height: 1.90 m (6 ft 3 in)
- Position: Centre-back

Team information
- Current team: Rapid Wien
- Number: 4

Youth career
- 2012–2022: Admira Wacker

Senior career*
Years	Team	Apps	(Gls)
2022–2024	Admira Wacker	35	(2)
2024–	Rapid Wien	21	(1)

International career
2021–2022	Austria U17	9	(0)
2022–2023	Austria U18	4	(0)
2023–	Austria U19	7	(0)
- * Club domestic league appearances and goals as of 16 August 2026

Jakob Maximilian Schöller (born 9 December 2005) is an Austrian professional footballer who plays as a centre-back for Austrian Bundesliga club Rapid Wien.

== Club career ==
Seen as one of the best young talents at Admira Wacker, where he has played from under-6 level, Schöller signed a new contract with the club in August 2022. Then, the Austrian moved to Rapid Wien for €0.5 million.

== International career ==
Schöller has represented Austria at youth international level.

== Career statistics ==
=== Club ===
As of match played 16 August 2026.

Appearances and goals by club, season and competition
Club	Season	League			Cup		Europe		Other		Total	
Club	Season	Division	Apps	Goals	Apps	Goals	Apps	Goals	Apps	Goals	Apps	Goals
Admira	2022–23	2. Liga	17	0	2	0	—		0	0	19	0
Admira	2023–24	2. Liga	18	2	1	0	—		0	0	19	2
Admira	Total		35	2	3	0	—		0	0	38	2
Rapid Wien	2024–25	Austrian Bundesliga	9	0	1	0	3 (Note: Appearances in UEFA Conference League)	0	—		13	0
Rapid Wien	2025–26	Austrian Bundesliga	9	1	0	0	1 (Note: Appearances in UEFA Europa League)	0	—		10	1
Rapid Wien	2026–27	Austrian Bundesliga	3	0	1	0	2	0	—		6	0
Rapid Wien	Total		21	1	2	0	6	0	—		29	1
Rapid Wien II	2024–25	2. Liga	2	0	—		—		—		2	0
Career total			58	3	5	0	6	0	0	0	69	3
