= Romeo Amane =

Ivorian footballer (born 2003)

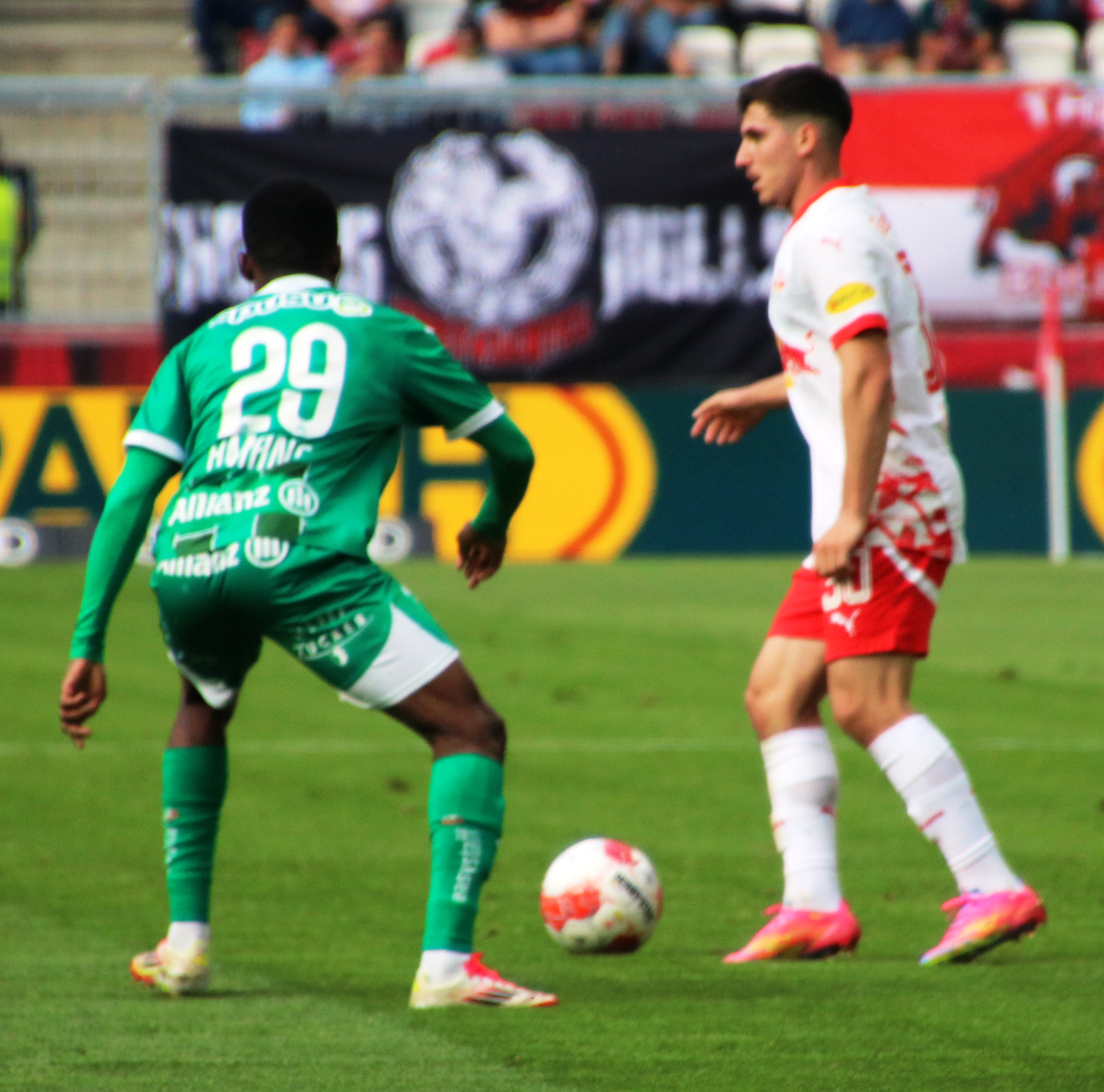
- Amane (left) with Rapid Wien in 2025

Personal information
- Full name: Akoua Romeo Amane
- Date of birth: 20 February 2003 (age 23)
- Place of birth: Abidjan, Ivory Coast
- Height: 1.76 m (5 ft 9 in)
- Position: Midfielder

Team information
- Current team: Anderlecht
- Number: 8

Youth career
- 2017–2021: ASEC Mimosas
- 2021–2022: Häcken

Senior career*
Years	Team	Apps	(Gls)
2022–2025	Häcken	69	(5)
2025–2026	Rapid Wien	43	(1)
2026–	Anderlecht	1	(0)
- * Club domestic league appearances and goals as of 11 September 2026

Akoua Romeo Amane (born 20 February 2003) is an Ivorian professional footballer who plays as a midfielder for Belgian Pro League club Anderlecht.

Born in Abidjan, Ivory Coast, Amane began his football career in his home country before moving to Europe to continue his development. He joined Rapid Wien and progressed through the club's ranks, eventually establishing himself in the senior team.

Primarily deployed as a central or defensive midfielder, Amane is known for his positional awareness, ball recovery ability, and disciplined passing in build-up play. His playing style emphasizes tactical responsibility and midfield stability rather than goal scoring.

He has also represented Ivory Coast at youth international level.

== Career ==
Raised in Abidjan, Amane began playing football with the Ivorian club ASEC Mimosas at the age of 14 in 2017. He transferred to the Swedish club Häcken on 28 November 2021. He made his professional debut with them in a 2–0 Allsvenskan loss to IFK Göteborg on 17 April 2022.

On 16 January 2025, Amane signed a four-and-a-half-year contract with Rapid Wien in Austria.

== Playing style ==
Amane is a dynamic midfielder who works hard, and is known by others, for his quality of passes given to other players. He is inspired by the play of Andres Iniesta.

== Career statistics ==
As of match played 15 October 2026

Appearances and goals by club, season and competition
Club	Season	League			National cup (Note: Includes Svenska Cupen, Austrian Cup)		Europe		Total	
Club	Season	Division	Apps	Goals	Apps	Goals	Apps	Goals	Apps	Goals
Häcken	2022	Allsvenskan	18	1	5	0	—		23	1
Häcken	2023	Allsvenskan	23	3	6	0	11 (Note: One appearance in UEFA Champions League, ten appearances in UEFA Europa League)	0	40	3
Häcken	2024	Allsvenskan	28	1	3	0	5 (Note: Appearances in UEFA Conference League)	1	36	2
Häcken	Total		69	5	14	0	16	1	99	6
Rapid Wien	2024–25	Austrian Bundesliga	9	1	—		2	0	11	1
Rapid Wien	2025–26	Austrian Bundesliga	31	0	4	0	12	0	47	0
Rapid Wien	2026–27	Austrian Bundesliga	3	0	0	0	4	0	7	0
Rapid Wien	Total		43	1	4	0	18	0	65	1
Anderlecht	2026–27	Belgian Pro League	1	0	0	0	2 (Note: Appearances in UEFA Europa League)	0	3	0
Career total			113	6	18	0	39	1	167	7

== Honours ==
BK Häcken

- Allsvenskan: 2022
