= Ercan Kara =

Austrian footballer (born 1996)

Personal information
- Date of birth: 3 January 1996 (age 30)
- Place of birth: Vienna, Austria
- Height: 1.92 m (6 ft 4 in)
- Position: Forward

Team information
- Current team: Rapid Wien
- Number: 9

Youth career
- 2003–2012: Slovan HAC

Senior career*
Years	Team	Apps	(Gls)
2012–2014	Slovan HAC	65	(33)
2014–2016	Austria Wien II	20	(1)
2016–2019	FC Mauerwerk	87	(83)
2019–2020	SV Horn	16	(13)
2020–2022	Rapid Wien	58	(27)
2022–2023	Orlando City	44	(16)
2023–2025	Samsunspor	31	(3)
2025	→ Rapid Wien (loan)	20	(2)
2025–	Rapid Wien	37	(9)

International career^{‡}
2021	Austria	7	(0)
- * Club domestic league appearances and goals as of 24 October 2026 ‡ National team caps and goals as of 15 November 2021

Ercan Kara (born 3 January 1996) is an Austrian professional footballer who plays as a forward for Rapid Wien.

He has previously played for Slovan HAC, Austria Wien II, FC Mauerwerk, SV Horn and Rapid Wien across five divisions of the Austrian football pyramid as well as Orlando City SC in Major League Soccer and Samsunspor in Süper Lig.

== Club career ==
=== Slovan HAC ===
Kara came through the Slovan HAC youth system. On 13 November 2011, he made his senior debut for Slovan's first team as a 15-year-old in the fourth-tier Wiener Stadtliga as a 60th-minute substitute for Burak Özbek in a 5–1 defeat at home to Nußdorfer AC. In his debut season, Kara made ten league appearances and a further appearance in the local Wiener Cup, but did not score. On 25 May 2013, Kara scored his first senior goal for Slovan, in a 3–2 Wiener Stadtliga defeat against Post SV Wien. It was his only goal of the season in 29 appearances. Slovan took voluntary relegation to the sixth tier Wiener Oberliga A. In the 2013–14 season, Kara scored 32 goals in 27 Oberliga appearances but the team did not achieve promotion following a seventh-place finish.

=== Austria Wien II ===
Ahead of the 2014–15 season, 18-year-old Kara signed with Austria Wien, spending two seasons with the club's reserve team in the third-tier Regionalliga Ost. He made 16 appearances and scored once. His playing time was limited as academy director Ralf Muhr expressed doubts about his fitness level.

=== FC Mauerwerk ===
In 2016, Kara returned to the Wiener Stadtliga with Karabakh Wien (later renamed FC Mauerwerk in 2018). Kara finished his first season with the team as the Wiener Stadtliga top goalscorer with 35 goals in 30 appearances as the team won the division title and promotion to the Regionalliga Ost. In the following two seasons, Kara again led the league in goals with 26 and 22 goals respectively as FC Mauerwerk earned 5th-place and 2nd-place finishes.

=== SV Horn ===
In July 2019, Kara signed with SV Horn of the 2. Liga. He made his competitive SV Horn debut on 20 July 2019 in an ÖFB Cup first-round game against FCM Traiskirchen, scoring twice in a 5–1 victory. He made his 2. Liga debut six days later, scoring another two goals as Horn beat Austria Wien II 5–1. With 13 goals in 16 appearances in his debut 2. Liga, Kara attracted first division interest and was sold by Horn after only six months.

=== Rapid Wien ===
In January 2020, Austrian Bundesliga club Rapid Wien signed Kara to a two-and-a-half-year contract. He made his debut on 23 February 2020, entering as an 81st-minute substitute for Christoph Knasmüllner with Rapid trailing 2–1 to TSV Hartberg and scored a 90+3rd-minute game-tying goal. In total, Kara scored three goals in nine appearances in the second half of the season. In his first full season with the club, Kara appeared in all 32 Bundesliga games and scored 15 goals, the fourth-highest in the league and the most in the Rapid squad. He also made his continental debut during the 2020–21 season, on 26 August 2020 against Lokomotiva Zagreb in the UEFA Champions League second qualifying round, scoring the only goal in a 1–0 win. The team lost in the third qualifying round, dropping them in to the 2020–21 UEFA Europa League group stage. Kara scored two Europa League goals, both in a 3–1 win over Irish team Dundalk, as Rapid finished third behind Arsenal and Molde. In March 2021, Rapid head coach Dietmar Kühbauer likened Kara's height, acrobatic ability and goalscoring prowess to that of a Zlatan Ibrahimović with fans later nicknaming him "Karabrimovic" on social media.

=== Orlando City ===
On 27 January 2022, with only six months left on his Rapid contract, Kara was sold to Major League Soccer team Orlando City ahead of the 2022 season for a reported $800,000. He signed a three-year Designated Player contract with additional club options in 2025 and 2026. Ercan scored his first goal in U.S. Open Cup competition on 10 May 2022, during a 2-1 round of 32 victory over the Philadelphia Union.

=== Samsunspor ===
On 2 September 2023, Kara transferred to Turkish Süper Lig club Samsunspor for an undisclosed fee.

==== Return to Rapid Wien ====
On 6 February 2025, Kara returned to Rapid Wien on loan. On 1 July 2025, Kara made a permanent transfer to Rapid Wien, signing a two-year contract.

== International career ==
Born in Austria, Kara is of Turkish descent and was also eligible to represent Turkey internationally. In January 2021, Kara said in a press conference that while he was aware Turkey was monitoring him and would consider representing them, he had only been contacted by Austrian officials. In March 2021, Franco Foda called up Kara to the Austria national team for the first time. He made his national team debut on 31 March 2021, coming on as a 74th-minute substitute for Xaver Schlager in a 4–0 2022 FIFA World Cup qualifying loss to Denmark. The game was played behind closed doors at Ernst-Happel-Stadion in his hometown, Vienna. In April 2021, Turkey manager Şenol Güneş admitted that he had missed out on cap-tying Kara having not been able to travel to Austria to watch him in person due to the COVID-19 pandemic. On 9 October 2021, Kara made his first start in Austria's 2–0 away win against the Faroe Islands in World Cup qualification, assisting the opening goal scored by Konrad Laimer.

== Career statistics ==
=== Club ===
As of 24 October 2026

Appearances and goals by club, season and competition
Club	Season	League			National cup (Note: Includes ÖFB Cup and U.S. Open Cup)		Continental		Other (Note: Includes Wiener Fußballcup and Leagues Cup)		Total	
Club	Season	Division	Apps	Goals	Apps	Goals	Apps	Goals	Apps	Goals	Apps	Goals
Slovan HAC	2011–12	Wiener Stadtliga	10	0	—		—		1	0	11	0
Slovan HAC	2012–13	Wiener Stadtliga	28	1	—		—		1	0	29	1
Slovan HAC	2013–14	Wiener Oberliga A	27	32	—		—		1	0	28	32
Slovan HAC	Total		65	33	0	0	0	0	3	0	68	33
Austria Wien II	2014–15	Regionalliga Ost	16	1	—		—		—		16	1
Austria Wien II	2015–16	Regionalliga Ost	4	0	—		—		—		4	0
Austria Wien II	Total		20	1	0	0	0	0	0	0	20	1
FC Mauerwerk	2016–17	Wiener Stadtliga	30	35	1	0	—		3	5	34	40
FC Mauerwerk	2017–18	Regionalliga Ost	29	26	1	1	—		—		30	27
FC Mauerwerk	2018–19	Regionalliga Ost	28	22	1	0	—		—		29	22
FC Mauerwerk	Total		87	83	3	1	0	0	3	5	93	89
SV Horn	2019–20	2. Liga	16	13	2	2	—		—		18	15
Rapid Wien	2019–20	Austrian Bundesliga	9	3	—		—		—		9	3
Rapid Wien	2020–21	Austrian Bundesliga	32	15	3	2	8 (Note: Two appearances, one goal in UEFA Champions League qualifying; six appearances, two goals in UEFA Europa League)	3	—		43	20
Rapid Wien	2021–22	Austrian Bundesliga	17	9	3	2	12 (Note: Two appearances in UEFA Champions League qualifying; ten appearances, three goals in UEFA Europa League)	3	—		32	14
Rapid Wien	Total		58	27	6	4	20	6	0	0	84	37
Orlando City	2022	Major League Soccer	29	11	4	1	—		1	0	34	12
Orlando City	2023	Major League Soccer	15	5	0	0	1	1	3	0	19	6
Orlando City	Total		44	16	4	1	1	1	4	0	53	18
Samsunspor	2023–24	Süper Lig	23	0	2	1	—		—		25	1
Samsunspor	2024–25	Süper Lig	8	0	1	0	—		—		9	0
Samsunspor	Total		31	0	3	1	—		—		34	1
Rapid Wien	2024–25	Austrian Bundesliga	15	1	—		3 (Note: Appearances in UEFA Conference League)	0	—		18	1
Rapid Wien	2025–26	Austrian Bundesliga	27	5	4	1	11	1	—		42	7
Rapid Wien	2026–27	Austrian Bundesliga	10	5	2	0	4	4	—		16	9
Rapid Wien	Total		53	11	6	1	18	5	—		77	17
Career total			374	184	24	10	38	12	10	5	446	211

=== International ===
As of 15 November 2021

Austria
Year	Apps	Goals
2021	7	0
Total	7	0

== Honours ==
FC Mauerwerk

- Wiener Stadtliga: 2016–17

Orlando City

- U.S. Open Cup: 2022

Individual

- Wiener Stadtliga golden boot: 2016–17
- Regionalliga Ost golden boot: 2017–18, 2018–19
