= Danilo Nikolić =

Danilo Nikolić may refer to:

- Danilo Nikolić (basketball) (born 1993), Montenegrin professional basketball player
- Danilo Nikolić (fencer), Serbian fencer in the 2012–13 Fencing World Cup
- Danilo Nikolić (footballer) (born 1983), Serbian footballer
- Danilo Nikolić (writer) (1926–2016), Serbian writer
