= Martin Ndzie =

Cameroonian association football player

Personal information
- Full name: Martin Beautrel Atemengue Ndzie
- Date of birth: 18 January 2003 (age 23)
- Place of birth: Yaoundé, Cameroon
- Height: 1.88 m (6 ft 2 in)
- Position: Defensive midfielder

Team information
- Current team: Rapid Wien
- Number: 14

Youth career
- Renaissance
- F.C. Ashdod

Senior career*
Years	Team	Apps	(Gls)
2022–2025	F.C. Ashdod	46	(0)
2023–2024	→ Hapoel Ramat Gan	28	(1)
2025–	Rapid Wien	8	(0)

International career^{‡}
2024–	Cameroon	3	(0)
- * Club domestic league appearances and goals as of 15 February 2026 ‡ National team caps and goals as of 17 March 2025

Martin Beautrel Atemengue Ndzie (born 16 January 2003) is a Cameroonian footballer who plays as a defensive midfielder for Rapid Wien, and the Cameroon national team.

== Career ==
Ndzie started for his career for Renaissance FC. On summer 2021 signed for F.C. Ashdod's youth team. On 23 January 2022 he made his senior debut in a 1–0 win against Bnei Sakhnin. The following September he was loaned to the Liga Leumit cub Hapoel Ramat Gan. On 12 May 2023 scored his debut goal in the 2–2 draw against Hapoel Ramat HaSharon.

On 7 August 2025, he transferred to Rapid Wien in the Austrian Football Bundesliga on a contract until 2029.

== National team ==
On 5 October 2024 he received his first call-up for the Cameroonian national team. On 11 October 2024 he made his debut in the 4–1 win against Kenya in the 2025 Africa Cup of Nations qualification competition.

== Career statistics ==
=== Club ===
As of 15 February 2026

Club	Season	League			State Cup		National cup		Continental		Other		Total	
Club	Season	Division	Apps	Goals	Apps	Goals	Apps	Goals	Apps	Goals	Apps	Goals	Apps	Goals
F.C. Ashdod	2021–22	Israeli Premier League	4	0	0	0	0	0	–		0	0	4	0
F.C. Ashdod	2022–23	Israeli Premier League	3	0	0	0	3	0	–		0	0	6	0
F.C. Ashdod	2023–24	Israeli Premier League	9	0	0	0	4	0	–		0	0	13	0
F.C. Ashdod	2024–25	Israeli Premier League	26	0	3	0	4	0	–		0	0	33	0
F.C. Ashdod	Total		42	0	3	0	11	0	0	0	0	0	56	0
Hapoel Ramat HaSharon	2024–25	Liga Leumit	28	1	0	0	0	0	–		0	0	28	1
Rapid Wien	2025–26	Austrian Bundesliga	8	0	—		2	0	3 (Note: Appearances in UEFA Conference League)	0	—		13	0
Career total			78	1	3	0	13	0	3	0	0	0	97	1
