= Ismaïl Seydi =

French footballer (born 2001)

Personal information
- Date of birth: 15 July 2001 (age 25)
- Place of birth: Paris, France
- Height: 1.81 m (5 ft 11 in)
- Position: Winger

Team information
- Current team: Sønderjyske Fodbold
- Number: 31

Youth career
- –2021: Toulouse MFC
- 2021–2022: AS Portet

Senior career*
Years	Team	Apps	(Gls)
2022–2023	FC Mauerwerk	22	(7)
2023–2026	Rapid Wien	7	(0)
2023–2025	SK Rapid Wien II	32	(6)
2025–2026	→ Torreense (loan)	33	(3)
2026–	Sønderjyske	5	(0)
- * Club domestic league appearances and goals as of 2 September 2026

Ismaïl Seydi (born 15 July 2001) is a French professional footballer who plays as a winger for Danish Superliga club Sønderjyske.

== Club career ==
Seydi joined SK Rapid Wien on 31 July 2023. On 28 March 2024, he extended his contract with SK Rapid Wien until 2028.

Seydi joined Torreense on loan on 2 August 2025.

In 2026 Seydi signed a 4-year long contract with the danish club Sønderjyske Fodbold

== Personal life ==
Born in France, Seydi is of Senegalese descent.

== Honours ==
Torreense

- Taça de Portugal: 2025–26
