= Bendegúz Bolla =

Hungarian footballer (born 1999)

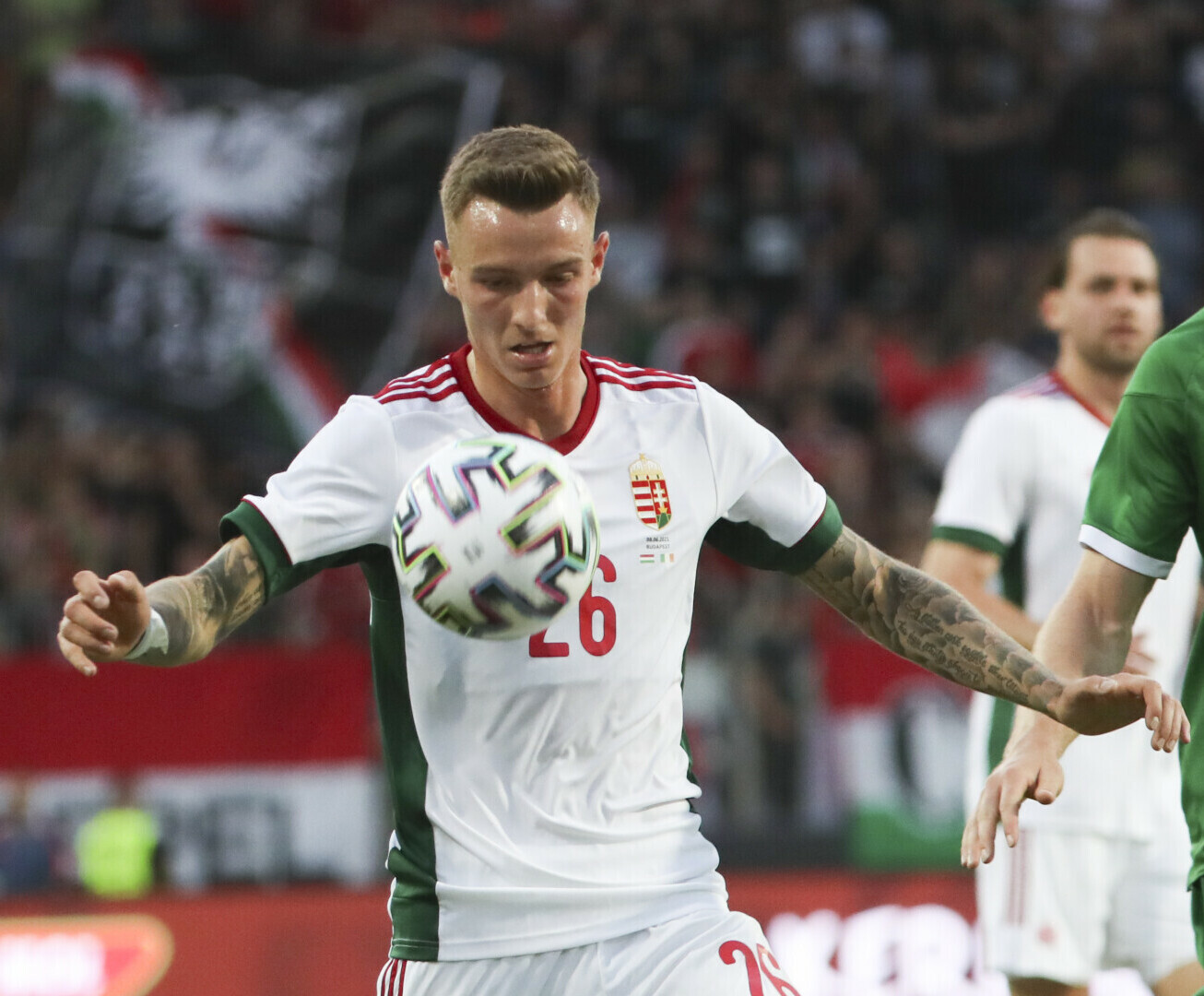
- Bolla playing for Hungary in 2021

Personal information
- Full name: Bendegúz Bence Bolla
- Date of birth: 22 November 1999 (age 26)
- Place of birth: Székesfehérvár, Hungary
- Height: 1.80 m (5 ft 11 in)
- Position: Right-back

Team information
- Current team: Rapid Wien
- Number: 77

Youth career
- Videoton
- Főnix Gold
- MTK Budapest

Senior career*
Years	Team	Apps	(Gls)
2017–2021	Fehérvár	28	(0)
2018–2019	→ Siófok (loan)	18	(3)
2019–2020	→ Zalaegerszeg (loan)	43	(1)
2021–2024	Wolverhampton Wanderers	0	(0)
2021–2023	→ Grasshopper (loan)	63	(6)
2023–2024	→ Servette (loan)	30	(5)
2024–	Rapid Wien	67	(7)

International career^{‡}
2016	Hungary U18	14	(4)
2017	Hungary U19	4	(2)
2019–2021	Hungary U21	8	(1)
2021–	Hungary	39	(0)
- * Club domestic league appearances and goals as of 24 October 2026 ‡ National team caps and goals as of 18 November 2026

Bendegúz Bence Bolla (Hungarian pronunciation: [ˈbɛndɛɡuːz ˈbollɒ], born 22 November 1999) is a Hungarian professional footballer who plays as a right-back for Austrian Bundesliga side Rapid Wien and the Hungary national team. Bolla made his senior debut for Hungary in 2021 when he was named for Euro 2020.

== Club career ==
=== Wolverhampton Wanderers ===
On 17 July 2021, Bolla joined Premier League club Wolverhampton Wanderers on a permanent deal from Hungarian side Fehérvár. He was immediately loaned out to Grasshoppers of the Swiss Super League for the 2021–22 season.

==== Loan to Grasshopper Club Zürich ====
On 25 July 2021, he debuted in the Swiss Super League on the first match day of the 2021–22 season against FC Basel at the Stadion Letzigrund, Zürich. Bolla was substituted in the 71st minute by Nikola Gjorgjev. On 31 July 2021, he played the entire match against BSC Young Boys at the Stadion Wankdorf, in Bern. On 11 September 2021, he supplied his first assist, leading to the 1–1 equalizer by Christián Herc against FC Luzern. He shot his first goal on 26 September 2021 in a 3–1 victory over FC Sion, where he took a direct shot off of Herc's corner kick to hammer it under the bar. One week later, he scored again in a 5–2 victory over FC St. Gallen. He has since supplied two more assists and has become a mainstay in the starting lineup, usually playing on the right wing. At the end of May 2022, after a successful season, he returned to his home club. In total, he played 30 league matches, of which he started in 29, shot four goals, and supplied three assists. As such, it is safe to say that he was instrumental in securing Grasshoppers' position in the top Swiss flight. After such a successful season, his loan was extended for another season.

On 27 June 2022, he returned to Grasshoppers for another loan spell for the 2022–23 Swiss Super League season. On 1 October 2022, he scored his first goal in the 2022–23 season against FC Zürich at the Letzigrund. Seven days later, on 8 October 2022, he scored his second goal of the season in a 4–4 draw against FC Sion. In an interview with Nemzeti Sport, he said that it was a good decision to stay in Switzerland because the coach remained the same and the core of the team was also preserved. He continued being an important part of the squad, featuring in nearly all league matches and supplying a total of four assists throughout the season.

==== Loan to Servette ====
On 25 May 2023, Grasshoppers announced that he would return to his parent club at the end of the season. On 29 August 2023, he returned to Switzerland and the Swiss Super League for another loan spell, this time at Grasshopper's rival Servette. His loan will last for one season, with an option to buy.

On 3 September 2023, he debuted against BSC Young Boys in the 2023–24 Swiss Super League. On 24 September 2023, he scored an own goal in a 2–0 defeat against FC Luzern. Three days later, on 27 September 2023, he gave an assist to Miroslav Stevanović in a 2–2 draw against FC Winterthur. On 29 October 2023, he entered the pitch in the 63rd minute and scored a goal in the 82nd minute in a 4–2 victory against Luzern at the Stade de Genève. On 4 February 2024, he scored a goal and gave an assist to Enzo Crivelli in a 3–1 victory over FC Stade Lausanne Ouchy on the 22nd match day of the 2023–24 Swiss Super League season. He was also voted as the man of the match. He scored the winning goal in a 2–1 victory over FC Lugano on game week 24 of the 2023–23 Swiss Super League.

On 2 June 2024, he won the Swiss Cup with Servette. He was subbed on in the final minutes of regular time and missed his penalty in the penalty shoot-out.

=== Rapid Wien ===
On 7 June 2024, Austrian Bundesliga side Rapid Wien announced that they had signed Bolla on a free transfer.

== International career ==
Bolla represented Hungary at youth level, making a combined 43 appearances for the under-17, under-18, under-19, and under-21 teams. He was called up to the Hungary senior team for the first time for their UEFA Nations League match with Russia on 6 September 2020, being named on the substitutes bench for the 3–2 loss.

On 1 June 2021, Bolla was included in Hungary's final 26-man squad for the rescheduled UEFA Euro 2020 tournament. On 4 June, he made his debut as a substitute for Gergő Lovrencsics in a 1–0 win over Cyprus.

At the Euro 2020 finals, Bolla was an unused substitute in the team's 3–0 loss to Portugal and 2–2 draw with Germany.

On 14 May 2024, he was announced as part of Hungary's 26-man squad for UEFA Euro 2024. In the team's opening match of the tournament against Switzerland, he came on as a half-time substitute for Ádám Lang. He went on to start against both Germany and Scotland as Hungary finished third in Group A.

== Personal life ==
Bolla's father is László Bolla, who is the co-founder of Főnix along with Zsolt Szoboszlai, father of Hungary national football team player Dominik Szoboszlai.

== Career statistics ==
=== Club ===
As of match played 27 October 2026

Appearances and goals by club, season and competition
Club	Season	League			National cup		Continental		Other		Total	
Club	Season	Division	Apps	Goals	Apps	Goals	Apps	Goals	Apps	Goals	Apps	Goals
Fehérvár	2017–18	Nemzeti Bajnokság I	1	0	1	0	—		—		2	0
Fehérvár	2020–21	Nemzeti Bajnokság I	27	0	7	1	3 (Note: Appearances in UEFA Europa League)	0	—		37	1
Fehérvár	2021–22	Nemzeti Bajnokság I	0	0	0	0	1 (Note: Appearance in UEFA Europa Conference League)	0	—		1	0
Fehérvár	Total		28	0	8	1	4	0	0	0	40	1
Siófok (loan)	2018–19	Nemzeti Bajnokság II	18	3	1	0	—		—		19	3
Zalaegerszeg (loan)	2018–19	Nemzeti Bajnokság II	17	0	0	0	—		—		17	0
Zalaegerszeg (loan)	2019–20	Nemzeti Bajnokság I	27	1	2	0	—		—		29	1
Zalaegerszeg (loan)	Total		44	1	2	0	0	0	0	0	46	1
Wolverhampton Wanderers	2021–22	Premier League	0	0	0	0	—		—		0	0
Grasshopper Club Zürich (loan)	2021–22	Swiss Super League	30	4	1	0	—		—		31	4
Grasshopper Club Zürich (loan)	2022–23	Swiss Super League	33	2	2	0	—		—		35	2
Grasshopper Club Zürich (loan)	Total		63	6	3	0	0	0	0	0	66	6
Servette (loan)	2023–24	Swiss Super League	30	5	5	0	10 (Note: Six appearances in UEFA Europa League, four appearances in UEFA Europa Conference League)	0	—		45	5
Rapid Wien	2024–25	Austrian Bundesliga	30	2	1	0	13 (Note: Four appearances in UEFA Europa League, nine appearances and one goal in UEFA Conference League)	1	—		44	3
Rapid Wien	2025–26	Austrian Bundesliga	27	4	4	1	9	0	—		40	5
Rapid Wien	2026–27	Austrian Bundesliga	10	1	2	0	5	1	—		17	2
Rapid Wien	Total		67	7	7	1	27	2	—		101	10
Career total			250	22	26	2	41	2	0	0	317	26

=== International ===
As of match played on 17 November 2026

Appearances and goals by national team and year
National team	Year	Apps	Goals
Hungary	2021	4	0
Hungary	2022	4	0
Hungary	2023	6	0
Hungary	2024	10	0
Hungary	2025	10	0
Hungary	2026	5	0
Total		39	0

== Honours ==
Servette FC

- Swiss Cup: 2023–24
