= Johannes Hoff Thorup =

Danish football manager (born 1989)

Personal information
- Date of birth: 19 February 1989 (age 37)
- Place of birth: Frederiksberg, Denmark

Team information
- Current team: Rapid Wien (head coach)

Youth career
- Years: Team
- Frederiksberg BK
- AB

Managerial career
- 2023–2024: Nordsjælland
- 2024–2025: Norwich City
- 2025–: Rapid Wien

Johannes Hoff Thorup (born 19 February 1989) is a Danish professional football manager who is currently the head coach of Austrian Bundesliga club Rapid Wien.

== Career ==
Thorup played youth football at Frederiksberg and AB, but never played as a senior. Instеаd, he took up youth coaching at AB in 2012.

In 2015, he became youth coach at Nordsjælland and was promoted to assistant to Flemming Pedersen in 2021 On 7 January 2023, he was made manager of the club, succeeding Pedersen.

On 30 May 2024, following the dismissal of previous manager David Wagner, Thorup was made the head coach of EFL Championship club Norwich City on a three-year contract. On 22 April 2025, Thorup was sacked following a poor run of form, wherein Norwich suffered six defeats from eight matches, with the club failing to make the season's play-offs.

On 30 December 2025, he was announced as the new manager of Austrian Football Bundesliga club Rapid Wien.

== Managerial statistics ==
As of match played 21 November 2026

Managerial record by team and tenure
Team	From	To	Record					Ref
Team	From	To	P	W	D	L	Win %	Ref
Nordsjælland	7 January 2023	30 May 2024	67	33	18	16	49.25	
Norwich City	30 May 2024	22 April 2025	47	14	14	19	29.79	
Rapid Wien	30 December 2025	Present	40	25	6	9	62.50	
Total			154	72	38	44	46.75	

== Honours ==
=== Manager ===
Nordsjælland:

- Danish Superliga runner-up: 2022–23
