= Daniel Nunoo =

Ghanaian footballer (born 2006)

Personal information
- Date of birth: 20 August 2006 (age 20)
- Place of birth: Ghana
- Height: 1.75 m (5 ft 9 in)
- Position: Winger

Team information
- Current team: Rapid Wien
- Number: 54

Youth career
- Shooting Stars FC
- 2024–2025: Rapid Wien

Senior career*
Years	Team	Apps	(Gls)
2025–	Rapid Wien	5	(1)
- * Club domestic league appearances and goals as of 9 April 2026

Daniel Nunoo (born 20 August 2006) is a Ghanaian professional footballer who plays as a winger for Rapid Wien.

== Club career ==
Nunoo played for Shooting Stars FC in Accra, before signing for Rapid Wien in the Austrian capital in September 2024.

Having proved himself with the reserve team in the 2. Liga, Nunoo made his professional debut with Rapid Wien in a 1–1 Bundesliga draw with TSV Hartberg on 7 February 2026.

In the following weeks, he scored his first goal during a 2–0 win against WAC, and delivered an assist in a 1–1 draw to Altach, but his rapid rise was halted by a muscle injury during a 1–0 win against RB Salzbourg, early March.
