= SK Rapid Wien =

Austrian professional football club

Rapid Wien
- Full name: Sportklub Rapid
- Nicknames: Die Grün-Weißen (The Green-Whites); Hütteldorfer; Rapidler
- Founded: 8 January 1899; 127 years ago
- Ground: Allianz Stadion
- Capacity: 28,345
- Chairman: Alexander Wrabetz
- Head coach: Johannes Hoff Thorup
- League: Austrian Bundesliga
- 2025–26: Austrian Bundesliga, 5th of 12
- Website: www.skrapid.at
Home colours	Away colours	colours

Sportklub Rapid (German pronunciation: [ʁaˈpiːd]), commonly known as Rapid Wien or Rapid Vienna in English, is an Austrian professional football club playing in the country's capital city of Vienna. Rapid has won the most Austrian championship titles (32), including the first title in the season 1911–12, as well as a German championship in 1941 during Nazi rule, although its cross-city arch rival FK Austria Vienna has won more combined league and cup titles. They share the honour of never being relegated with Austria Vienna. Rapid twice reached the final of the European Cup Winners' Cup in 1985 and 1996, losing on both occasions. Rapid’s most recent significant achievement in European competition was reaching the quarter-finals of the 2024–25 UEFA Conference League, where they were eliminated by Djurgårdens IF.

The club is often known as Die Grün-Weißen (The Green-Whites) for its team colours or as Hütteldorfer, in reference to the location of the Allianz Stadion, which is in Hütteldorf, part of the city's 14th district in Penzing.

== History ==
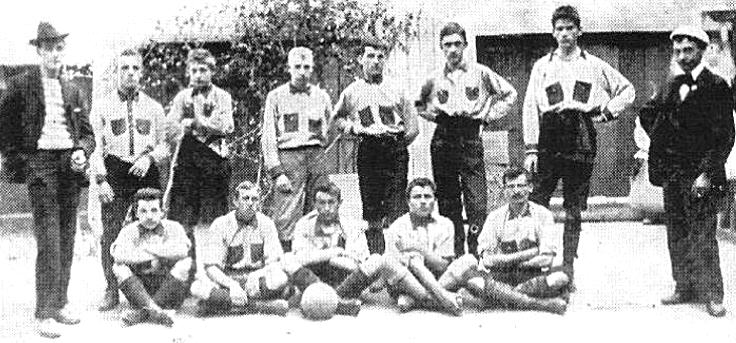
The 1. Arbeiter FC in 1898

The club was founded in 1897 as Erster Wiener Arbeiter-Fußball-Club (First Viennese Workers' Football Club). The team's original colours were red and blue, which are still often used in away matches. On 8 January 1899, the club was (thanks to Wilhelm Goldschmidt), taking on its present name of Sportklub Rapid, following the example of Rapide Berlin. Wien or Vienna are commonly added when referring to the club but are not part of the official name. In 1904, the team colours were changed to green and white. The club won Austria's first ever national championship in 1911–12 by a single point, and retained the title the following season.

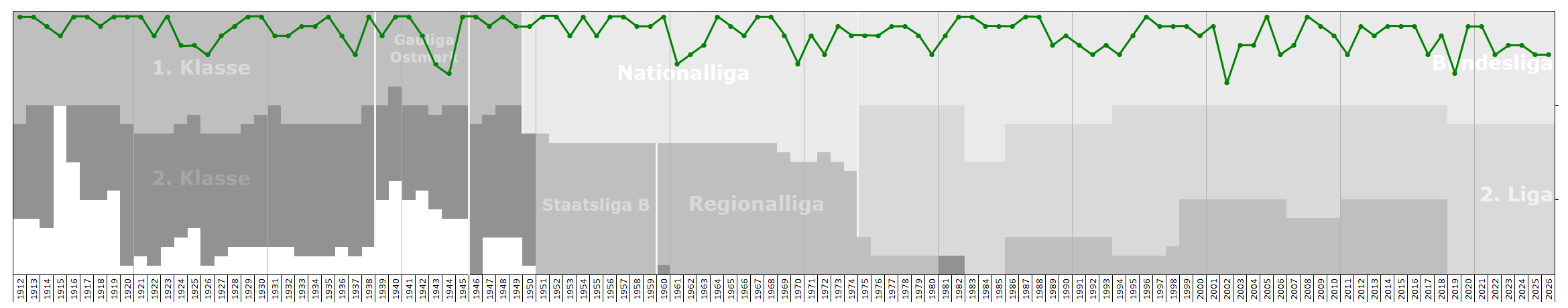
Historical chart of Rapid Wien league performance

=== Between World Wars ===
Rapid became a dominant force during the years between the world wars, an era in which Austria was one of the leading football nations on the continent. It won its first hat-trick of titles from 1919 to 1921. After the annexation of Austria to Germany in 1938, Rapid joined the German football system, playing in the regional first division Gauliga Ostmark along with clubs such as Wacker Wien and Admira Vienna. Rapid would be the most successful of these clubs. They won the Tschammerpokal, predecessor of today's DFB-Pokal, in 1938 with a 3–1 victory over FSV Frankfurt, and followed that with a German Championship in 1941 by defeating Schalke 04, the most dominant German club of the era. The team was able to overcome a 3–0 Schalke lead to win the match 4–3.

=== Post-World War II ===
As the winners of the 1954–55 season, Rapid were Austria's entrant for the inaugural European Cup in the following season. They were drawn in the first round against PSV and opened with a 6–1 home victory, with Alfred Körner scoring a hat-trick. Despite losing the away leg 1–0, the club still advanced to a quarter-final, where they started with a 1–1 home draw against Milan before being defeated 7–2 in the away match at the San Siro to lose 8–3 on aggregate.

Rapid's best performance in the European Cup came in the 1960–61 season when they reached the semi-final before being eliminated by eventual winners Benfica, 4–1 on aggregate. Previously, in the quarter-final the club required a replay to eliminate East German club Aue from the tournament after a 3–3 aggregate draw. The away goals rule would have seen Aue advance without needing the replay, held at the St Jakob Park in neutral Basel.

The club was involved in a controversial episode in 1984 when they eliminated Celtic from the last 16 of the European Cup Winners' Cup. Celtic were leading 4–3 on aggregate with 14 minutes left in the match when Rapid conceded a penalty. As the Rapid players protested to the match officials, their defender Rudolf Weinhofer then fell to the ground and claimed to have been hit by a bottle thrown from the stands. However, television images clearly showed that a bottle was thrown onto the pitch and did not hit Weinhofer. The match finished 4–3, but Rapid appealed to UEFA for a replay, and both teams were fined. The replay appeal was turned down initially, but Rapid appealed for a second time. On this occasion, Rapid's fine was doubled but UEFA also stipulated the match be replayed 160 kilometres (100 mi) from Celtic's ground. The game was held on 12 December 1984 at Old Trafford, Manchester, and Rapid won 1–0 through a Peter Pacult strike.

Rapid reached its first European final in 1985, losing 3–1 in the Cup Winners' Cup Final to Everton in Rotterdam. Eleven years later, in the same tournament's final in Brussels, Rapid lost 1–0 to Paris Saint-Germain.

Rapid last reached the group stage of the UEFA Champions League in 2005–06 after beating F91 Dudelange of Luxembourg 9–3 on aggregate and then defeating Lokomotiv Moscow 2–1 on aggregate in a play-off after a 1–0 victory in Russia. They eventually finished last in their group after losing all of their matches against Bayern Munich, Juventus and Club Brugge.

In the 2007-08 Austrian Football Bundesliga season, Rapid won the league for the 32nd time, the most of any club in Austria.

In 2015, the Rapid youth team took part in the third season of the Football for Friendship international children's social program, the final events of which were held in Berlin.

== Woman's section ==
In 2022, the founding of a woman's section was initiated by a petition of club members and a positive vote at the membership meeting. Katja Gürtler was appointed as the first head coach in August 2023. The first team started competing in the 3rd tier (Wiener Frauen Landesliga) of the Austrian Woman's football league system in the 2024/25 season.

In their first season, they won the league with a perfect record as well as the regional Cup competition (Wiener Frauen Cup). They also won the promotion play-off earning them a spot in the 2. Bundesliga for the 2025/26 season. In the 2025/26 season, they secured the 2nd place and were promoted to the Bundesliga.

== Club culture ==
=== Rapid Viertelstunde ===
Almost since the club's beginnings, Rapid fans have announced the last 15 minutes of the match by way of the traditional "Rapid-Viertelstunde" – rhythmic clapping at home or away regardless of the score. The first mention of the practice goes back to 1913, and on 21 April 1918 a newspaper wrote about the fans clapping at the beginning of the "Rapid-Viertelstunde". Over the decades, there have been many instances where the team managed to turn around a losing position by not giving up and, with their fans' support, fighting their way to a win just before the final whistle.

=== Fans ===
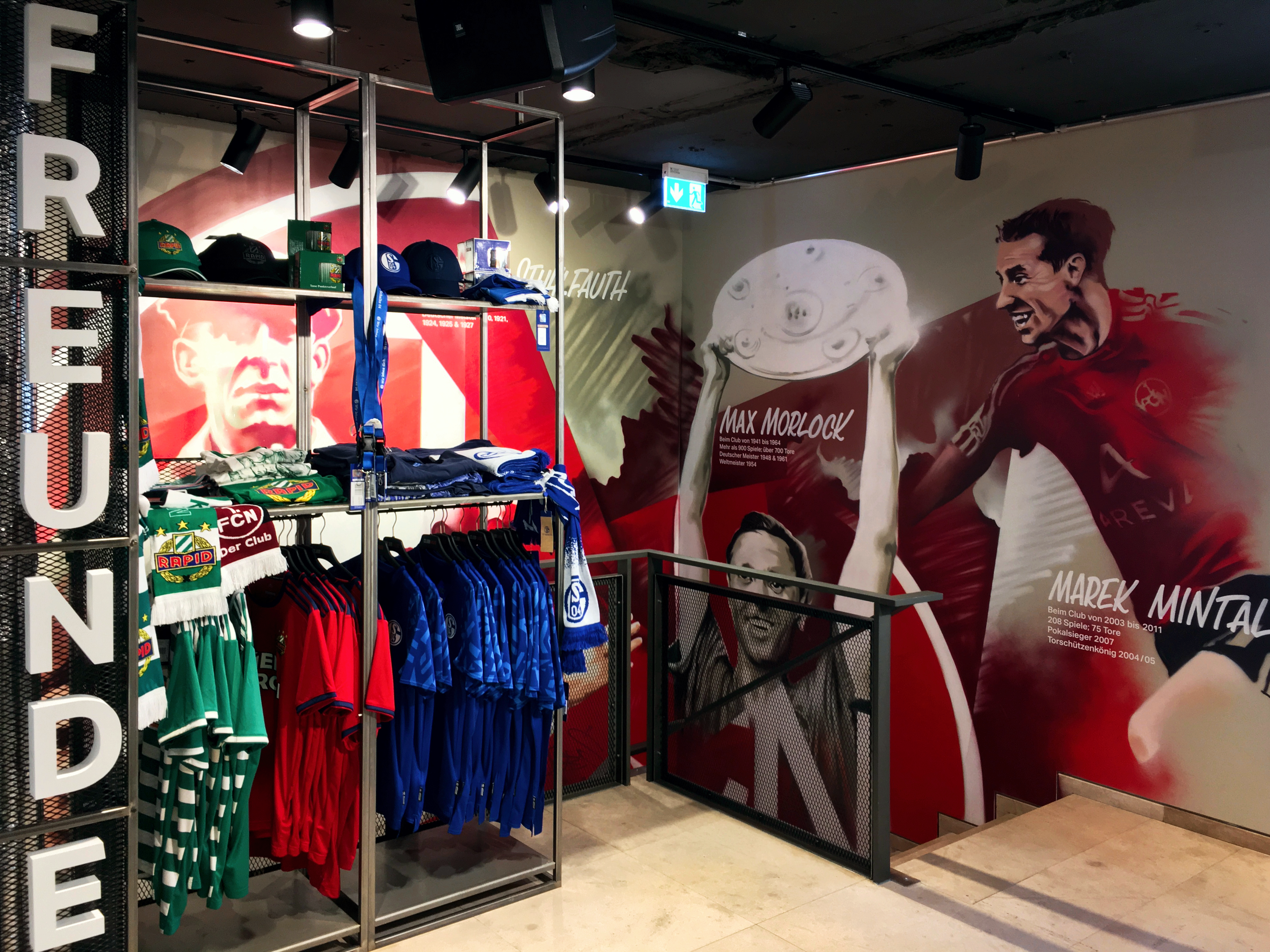
Friendship corner in the Fan Shop of the 1. FC Nürnberg with trikots of Rapid Wien.

The biggest fan club is Ultras Rapid, which was founded in 1988. Other important fan clubs are the ultras group Tornados Rapid and Spirits Rapid and the hooligan firm Alte Garde Dritte Halbzeit.

The active supporters are situated in the Block West stand, which has a capacity of 8,500 spectators. The old Block West in the now demolished Gerhard-Hanappi-Stadion had about 2,700 seats.

The fan-base of Rapid is connected, in a friendly way, with the supporters of the German club Nürnberg, the Croatian club Dinamo Zagreb, the Italian club Venezia, the Hungarian club Ferencváros and the Greek club Panathinaikos. As Rapid, Ferencváros and Panathinaikos also play in green the alliance is nicknamed the "Green Brothers"

== Stadium ==
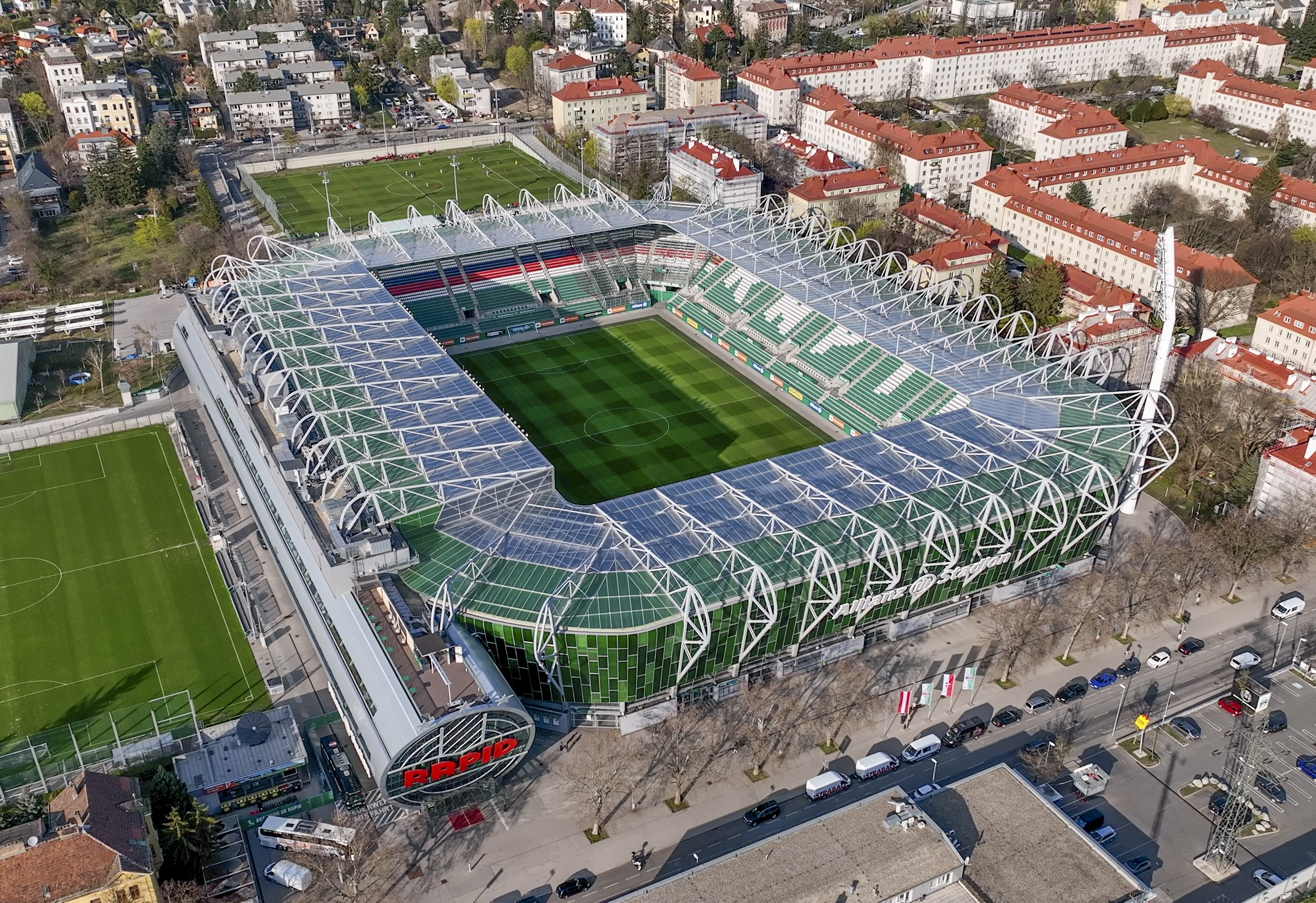
Allianz Stadion

Rapid played at the Gerhard Hanappi Stadium - which was opened on 10 May 1977 with a Vienna derby match against Austria Wien - until the 2013–14 season. The stadium bore the name of its architect Gerhard Hanappi, who also played for Rapid from 1950 to 1965. Prior to 1980, when it was renamed in his honour, it was known as the Weststadion (Western Stadium), due to its geographical location in the city.

In June 2014, it was announced that a new stadium, the Allianz Stadion, will be built in place of the old Gerhard Hanappi Stadium. During its construction, Rapid played its home games in the Ernst Happel Stadion.

The stadium was officially unveiled when Rapid Wien hosted Chelsea in a pre-season friendly on 16 July 2016 and won 2–0.

== Rivalries ==
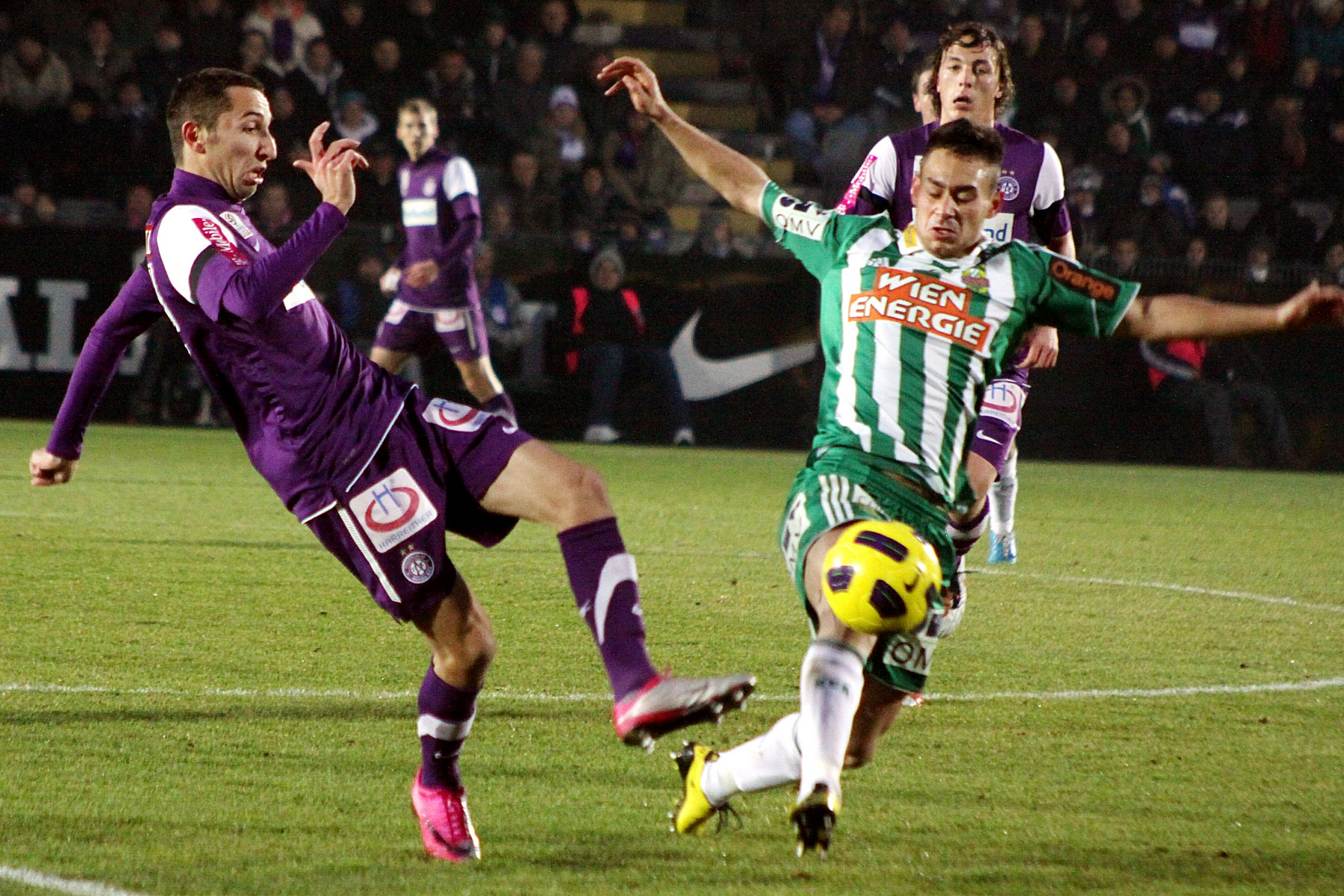
A 2010 Wien derby match between Rapid Wien and Austria Wien.

Rapid Wien contest the Vienna derby with their local Vienna rival FK Austria Wien. The two clubs are amongst the most supported and successful football teams in the entire country, and are the only Austrian clubs to have never been relegated. Both teams originate from Hietzing, the 13th district in the west of the city, but have since moved into different districts. While Austria Wien is seen as a middle-class club, Rapid traditionally hold the support of the capital's working class. The two clubs first met in a league championship match on 8 September 1911, a 4–1 victory for Rapid. The fixture is the most-played derby in European football after the Old Firm in Glasgow between Rangers and Celtic.

== Honours ==
=== Domestic ===
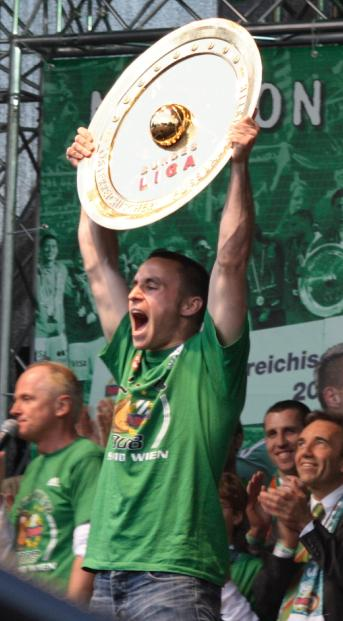
Steffen Hofmann celebrating the championship 2008.

Rapid Wien is Austria's record titleholder, lifting the trophy a total of 32 times, and the club also won a German Championship and German Cup while part of that country's football competition from 1938 to 1945 following the annexation of Austria by Nazi Germany on 12 March 1938.

Type	Competition	Titles	Seasons
International	Mitropa Cup	2	1930, 1951
Domestic	Austrian Bundesliga	32	1911–12, 1912–13, 1915–16, 1916–17, 1918–19, 1919–20, 1920–21, 1922–23, 1928–29, 1929–30, 1934–35, 1937–38, 1939–40, 1940–41, 1945–46, 1947–48, 1950–51, 1951–52, 1953–54, 1955–56, 1956–57, 1959–60, 1963–64, 1966–67, 1967–68, 1981–82, 1982–83, 1986–87, 1987–88, 1995–96, 2004–05, 2007–08
Domestic	German Championship	1	1941
Domestic	Austrian Cup	14	1918–19, 1919–20, 1926–27, 1945–46, 1961–62, 1967–68, 1968–69, 1971–72, 1975–76, 1982–83, 1983–84, 1984–85, 1986–87, 1994–95
Domestic	German Cup	1	1938
Domestic	Austrian Supercup	4	1986, 1987, 1988, 2008

- record

=== Continental Finals ===
Cup Winners' Cup

- Runners-up: 1984–85, 1995–96

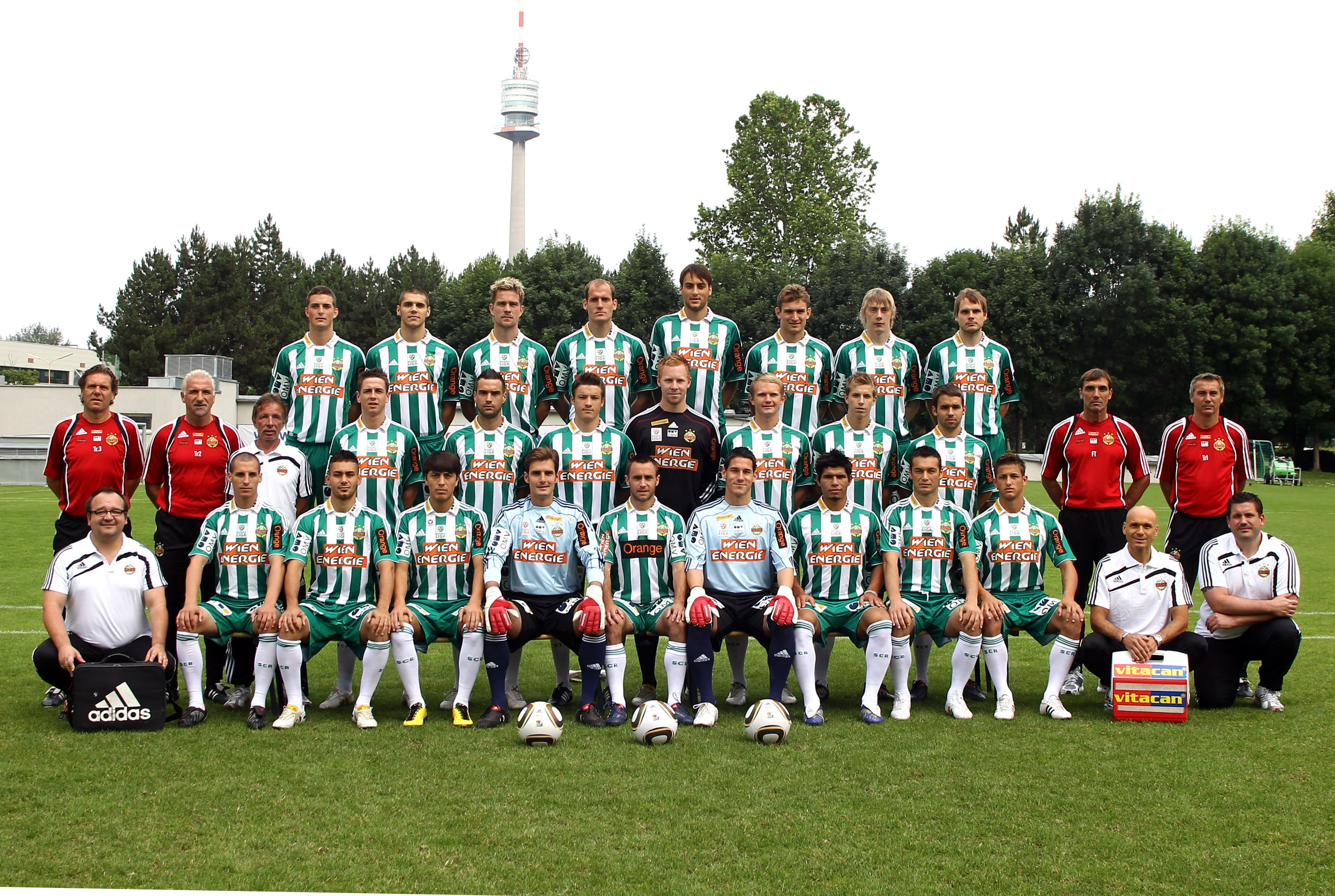
Team photo for the 2010–2011 season

== Players ==
=== Current squad ===
As of 8 September 2026

Note: Flags indicate national team as defined under FIFA eligibility rules; some limited exceptions apply. Players may hold more than one non-FIFA nationality.

No.	Pos.	Nation	Player
1	GK	AUT	Niklas Hedl
2	DF	AUT	Eaden Roka
4	DF	AUT	Jakob Schöller
6	DF	FRA	Serge-Philippe Raux-Yao
7	FW	AUS	Marco Tilio
8	FW	DEN	Tonni Adamsen
9	FW	AUT	Ercan Kara
10	FW	NOR	Petter Nosa Dahl
14	MF	CMR	Martin Ndzie
15	FW	AUT	Nikolaus Wurmbrand
18	MF	AUT	Matthias Seidl (captain)
20	DF	CIV	Ange Ahoussou
21	MF	AUT	Louis Schaub
22	MF	AUT	Yusuf Demir
23	DF	AUT	Jonas Auer
24	DF	MAD	Jean Marcelin

No.	Pos.	Nation	Player
25	GK	AUT	Paul Gartler
30	MF	AUT	Nicolas Bajlicz
38	DF	GER	Jannes Horn
43	FW	MLI	Moulaye Haïdara
44	MF	AUT	Lorenz Szladits
47	DF	TUN	Amin-Elias Gröller
50	GK	AUT	Laurenz Orgler
51	GK	AUT	Benjamin Göschl
53	DF	AUT	Dominik Vincze
54	FW	GHA	Daniel Nunoo
55	DF	SRB	Nenad Cvetković
61	DF	TUR	Furkan Demir
71	FW	COD	Claudy Mbuyi
77	DF	HUN	Bendegúz Bolla

==== Out on loan ====
Note: Flags indicate national team as defined under FIFA eligibility rules; some limited exceptions apply. Players may hold more than one non-FIFA nationality.

No.	Pos.	Nation	Player
—	DF	AUT	Dominik Weixelbraun (at Austria Lustenau until 30 June 2027)

=== SK Rapid II ===
As of 1 March 2026

Note: Flags indicate national team as defined under FIFA eligibility rules; some limited exceptions apply. Players may hold more than one non-FIFA nationality.

No.	Pos.	Nation	Player
1	GK	AUT	Christoph Haas
2	DF	AUT	Eaden Roka
3	DF	AUT	Paul Ertl
4	DF	AUT	Jakob Brunnhofer
5	DF	BIH	Kenan Muharemović
6	DF	GHA	Keneth Yeboah
7	FW	AUT	Oliver Strunz
8	MF	MLI	Ousmane Thiero
11	MF	AUT	Yasin Mankan
14	FW	AUT	Tare Ekereokosu
17	MF	PLE	Omar Badarneh
19	FW	AUT	René Kriwak
21	FW	AUT	David Berger
22	MF	AUT	Ensar Mušić
23	FW	MLI	Moulaye Haïdara

No.	Pos.	Nation	Player
27	MF	AUT	Dalibor Velimirović
28	MF	AUT	Lorenz Szladits
30	FW	AUT	Marcel Stöhr
32	DF	SVK	Svetozár Ožvold
33	DF	AUT	Erik Stehrer
34	MF	AUT	Fabian Silber
35	DF	AUT	Amar Hadžimuratović
36	DF	AUT	Daniel Mahiya
37	FW	AUT	Daris Đezić
38	MF	TUR	Emirhan Altundağ
39	FW	AUT	Philipp Moizi
42	FW	AUT	Kenny Nzogang
43	DF	AUT	Lukas Haselmayr
44	GK	AUT	Manuel Fellner
50	GK	HUN	Ferenc Lányi
51	GK	AUT	Aldin Softić

=== Notable former players ===
Nation	Name	Years	A	Position	G	SR
(Austria) AUT	Richard Kuthan	1911–1926, 1927-1929	244	Striker	164	0.672
(Austria) AUT	Josef Uridil	1918–1925, 1926-1927	106	Striker	127	1.198
(Austria) AUT	Edi Bauer	1911–1926	188	Striker	133	0.707
(Austria) AUT	Ferdinand Wesely	1920–1931	206	Striker	121	0.587
(Austria) AUT	Robert Dienst	1948–1962	284	Striker	307	1.080
(Austria) AUT	Franz Weselik	1923–1934	175	Striker	160	0.914
(Austria) AUT	Rudolf Flögel	1958–1972	332	Striker	145	0.436
(Austria) AUT	Matthias Kaburek	1928–1936, 1939-1945	158	Striker	138	0.873
(Austria) AUT	Johann Riegler	1948–1961	272	Striker	160	0.588
(Austria) AUT	Peter Schöttel	1986–2002	436	Defender	4	0.009
(Austria) AUT	Michael Konsel	1985–1997	395	Goalkeeper		
(Austria) AUT	Hans Krankl	1970–1978, 1981–1986	350	Striker	267	0.763
(Austria) AUT	Gerhard Hanappi	1950–1965	333	Midfielder	114	0.342
(Austria) AUT	Reinhard Kienast	1978–1992	393	Midfielder	61	0.155
(Austria) AUT	Heribert Weber	1978–1989	315	Defender	39	0.124
(Austria) AUT	Helge Payer	2001–2012	298	Goalkeeper		
(Austria) AUT	Franz Binder	1938–1948	242	Striker	267	1.103
(Austria) AUT	Ernst Happel	1942–1954, 1956–1959	240	Defender	25	0.104
(Austria) AUT	Walter Zeman	1945–1961	235	Goalkeeper		
(Austria) AUT	Robert Körner	1942–1958	212	Striker	80	0.377
(Austria) AUT	Alfred Körner	1942–1959	286	Striker	157	0.548
(Austria) AUT	Andi Herzog	1986–1992, 2002–2003	174	Attacking midfielder	37	0.213
(Austria) AUT	Andreas Ivanschitz	2000–2005	147	Attacking midfielder	25	0.170
(Austria) AUT	Leopold Grausam	1963–1970	142	Forward	58	0.408
(Austria) AUT	Roman Wallner	1999–2004	134	Forward	42	0.313
(Austria) AUT	Florian Kainz	2014–2016	98	Midfielder	15	0.153
(Austria) AUT	György Garics	2001–2006	99	Full-back	3	0.030
(Austria) AUT	Erwin Hoffer	2006–2009	85	Forward	41	0.482
(Austria) AUT	Guido Burgstaller	2011–2014, 2022–2025	158	Forward	58	0.367
(Albania) ALB	Hamdi Salihi	2009–2012	67	Forward	36	0.537
(Belgium) BEL	Boli Bolingoli-Mbombo	2017–2019	56	Left-back	3	0.054
(Belarus) BLR	Alyaksandr Myatlitski	1991–1993	58	Defender	9	0.155
(Brazil) BRA	Joelinton	2016–2018	60	Midfielder	15	0.250
(Bulgaria) BUL	Trifon Ivanov	1995–1997	53	Defender	7	0.132
(Canada) CAN	Ante Jazić	2001–2004	107	Left-back	1	0.009
(Croatia) CRO	Zlatko Kranjčar	1983–1990	210	Striker	106	0.505
(Croatia) CRO	Mario Bazina	2006–2008	72	Midfielder	18	0.250
(Croatia) CRO	Nikica Jelavić	2008–2010	71	Forward	27	0.380
(Czech Republic) CZE	René Wagner	1996–2004	220	Forward	75	0.341
(Czech Republic) CZE	Ladislav Maier	1998–2005	161	Goalkeeper		
(Czech Republic) CZE	Antonín Panenka	1981–1985	127	Attacking midfielder	63	0.496
(Czech Republic) CZE	Marek Kincl	2004–2007	92	Striker	27	0.278
(Czech Republic) CZE	Radek Bejbl	2005–2007	59	Defensive midfielder	3	0.051
(Denmark) DEN	Johnny Bjerregaard	1966–1972	151	Striker	96	0.636
(Finland) FIN	Mako Heikkinen	2007–2013	173	Defensive midfielder	4	0.023
(Georgia (country)) GEO	Giorgi Kvilitaia	2016–2018	55	Striker	17	0.309
(Germany) GER	Steffen Hofmann	2002–2005, 2006–2018	434	Midfielder	98	0.226
(Germany) GER	Oliver Freund	1997–2002	126	Midfielder	6	0.048
(Germany) GER	Jens Dowe	1999–2001	60	Attacking midfielder	7	0.117
(Greece) GRE	Thanos Petsos	2013–2016, 2017–2018	92	Defensive midfielder	5	0.054
(Greece) GRE	Taxiarchis Fountas	2019–2022	68	Forward	35	0.515
(Kosovo) KOS	Atdhe Nuhiu	2010–2013	59	Forward	13	0.220
(Montenegro) MNE	Branko Bošković	2007–2010	104	Attacking midfielder	19	0.183
(Netherlands) NED	Gaston Taument	2005–2008	61	Winger	4	0.066
(Norway) NOR	Jan Åge Fjørtoft	1989–1993	129	Centre forward	63	0.488
(Poland) POL	Krzysztof Ratajczyk	1996–2001	142	Defender	1	0.007
(Poland) POL	Maciej Śliwowski	1993–1996	71	Forward	21	0.296
(Slovakia) SVK	Marek Penksa	1996–2000	110	Midfielder	18	0.164
(Slovakia) SVK	Ján Novota	2011–2017	96	Goalkeeper		
(Slovakia) SVK	Peter Hlinka	2004–2007	93	Midfielder	11	0.118
(Slovakia) SVK	Jozef Valachovič	2004–2007	71	Defender	7	0.099
(Tajikistan) TJK	Sergei Mandreko	1992–1997	107	Midfielder	16	0.150
(United States) USA	Terrence Boyd	2012–2014	59	Forward	28	0.475
(Socialist Federal Republic of Yugoslavia) YUG	Petar Bručić	1982–1987	118	Midfielder	6	0.051
(Socialist Federal Republic of Yugoslavia) YUG	Dejan Savićević	1999–2001	44	Midfielder	18	0.409

Players with most appearances are Peter Schöttel (436), Steffen Hofmann (434), and Michael Konsel (395). The top three scorers are Josef Uridil (score rate 1.198), Franz Binder (1.103), Robert Dienst (1.080).

== Club staff ==
Position	Name
President	(Austria) Alexander Wrabetz
Vice-president	(Austria) Nikolaus Rosenauer
Sports coordinator	(Germany) Steffen Hofmann
Sporting director	(Austria) Markus Katzer
Manager	(Denmark) Johannes Hoff Thorup
Assistant managers	(Denmark) Alan Gürkan Arac (Serbia) Luka Pavlović (England) Joe Shulberg
Goalkeeper coach	(Austria) Jürgen Macho
Fitness coach	(Austria) Martin Hiden
Athletic coach	(Austria) Tony Prünster (Austria) Julian Helml (Austria) Alexander Steinbichler
Match analyst	(Germany) Daniel Schmitt
Club doctor	(Austria) Thomas Balzer (Austria) Patrick Bitzinger (Poland) Wojtek Burzec (Austria) Lukas Brandner (Austria) Manuel Rosenthaler (Austria) Wolfgang Skalsky
Physiotherapist	(Austria) Gerald Kemmer
Kit Manager	(Serbia) Dragiša Vukadinović

== Coaching history ==
- (Austria) Dionys Schönecker (1910–25)
- (England) Stanley Wilmott (1925–26)
- (Federal State of Austria) Edi Bauer (1926–36)
- (Nazi Germany) Leopold Nitsch (1936–45)
- (Austria) Hans Pesser (1 July 1945 – 28 February 1953)
- (Austria) Josef Uridil (1953–54)
- (Austria) Viktor Hierländer (1954–55)
- (Austria) Leopold Gernhardt (1955)
- (Austria) Franz Wagner (1955)
- (Austria) Alois Beranek (1956)
- (Austria) Franz Wagner (1956)
- (Austria) Max Merkel (1 July 1956 – 30 June 1958)
- (Austria) Rudolf Kumhofer (1958–59)
- (Austria) Robert Körner (1 July 1959 – 30 June 1966)
- (Austria) Rudolf Vytlacil (1 July 1966–68)
- (Austria) Karl Decker (1968–70)
- (Austria) Rudolf Vytlacil (1968 – 30 April 1969)
- (Austria) Karl Rappan (1969–70)
- (Austria) Gerd Springer (1970–72)
- (Austria) Robert Körner (1972)
- (Czechoslovakia) Ernst Hlozek (1 April 1972 – 22 April 1975)
- (Austria) Josef Pecanka (1975)
- (Austria) F. Binder / (Austria) R. Körner (1 September 1975 – 30 June 1976)
- (Poland) Antoni Brzeżańczyk (1976–77)
- (Austria) Robert Körner (1977)
- (Austria) Karl Schlechta (1978–79)
- (Austria) Walter Skocik (1 July 1979 – 1 April 1982)
- (Austria) Rudolf Nuske (1982)
- (Socialist Federal Republic of Yugoslavia) Otto Barić (1 July 1982 – 30 June 1985)
- (Socialist Federal Republic of Yugoslavia) Vlatko Marković (1 July 1985 – 30 June 1986)
- (Socialist Federal Republic of Yugoslavia) Otto Barić (1 July 1986 – 11 September 1988)
- (Austria) Wilhelm Kaipel (interim) (12 September 1988 – 19 September 1988)
- (Socialist Federal Republic of Yugoslavia) Vlatko Marković (19 September 1988 – 30 June 1989)
- (Austria) Hans Krankl (1 July 1989 – 30 June 1992)
- (Austria) August Starek (1 July 1992 – 31 May 1993)
- (Austria) Hubert Baumgartner (1 July 1993 – 22 May 1994)
- (Austria) Ernst Dokupil (23 May 1994 – 1 April 1998)
- (Austria) Heribert Weber (1 April 1998 – 1 May 2000)
- (Austria) Ernst Dokupil (1 July 2000 – 18 August 2001)
- (Austria) Peter Persidis (interim) (18 Aug 2001 – 5 September 2001)
- (Germany) Lothar Matthäus (6 September 2001 – 10 May 2002)
- (Austria) Josef Hickersberger (1 July 2002 – 31 December 2005)
- (Austria) Georg Zellhofer (1 Jan 2006 – 27 August 2006)
- (Austria) Peter Pacult (5 September 2006 – 11 April 2011)
- (Austria) Zoran Barisic (interim) (11 April 2011 – 30 May 2011)
- (Austria) Peter Schöttel (1 June 2011 – 17 April 2013)
- (Austria) Zoran Barisic (17 April 2013 – 6 June 2016)
- (Germany) Mike Büskens (7 June 2016 – 7 November 2016)
- (Austria) Damir Canadi (11 November 2016 – 8 April 2017)
- (Austria) Goran Djuricin (9 April 2017 – 29 September 2018)
- (Austria) Dietmar Kühbauer (1 October 2018 – 10 November 2021)
- (Germany) Steffen Hofmann (interim) (11 November 2021 – 28 November 2021)
- (Austria) Ferdinand Feldhofer (29 November 2021 – 15 October 2022)
- (Austria) Zoran Barisic (16 October 2022 – 14 November 2023)
- (Germany) Robert Klauß (20 November 2023 – 24 April 2025)
- (Austria) Stefan Kulovits (interim) (24 April 2025 – 1 June 2025)
- (Austria) Peter Stöger (2 June 2025 – 28 November 2025)
- (Austria) Stefan Kulovits (interim) (29 November 2025 – 29 December 2025)
- (Denmark) Johannes Hoff Thorup (30 December 2025 – 31 June 2027)

== See also ==
- List of SK Rapid Wien records and statistics
