= 2021–22 SK Rapid Wien season =

Rapid Wien
2021–22 season
- Chairman: Martin Bruckner
- Head coach: Ferdinand Feldhofer (from 29 November); Steffen Hofmann (interim); Dietmar Kühbauer (until 10 November)
- Stadium: Allianz Stadion
- Austrian Football Bundesliga: Winner (ECL play-off); 5th (championship round); 5th (regular season)
- Austrian Cup: Quarter-finals
- Champions League: Second qualifying round
- Europa League: Group stage, 3rd
- Conference League: Knockout round play-offs
- Top goalscorer: League: Marco Grüll, Ercan Kara (9); All: Marco Grüll (16)
- Highest home attendance: 26,000 vs. Austria Wien; 20 March 2022
- Lowest home attendance: 8,900 vs. SCR Altach (Note: Not including games with a limited number spectators due to COVID-19 restrictions.); 20 November 2021
- Average home league attendance: 14,800 (Note: Due to COVID-19 no or a limited number of spectators were allowed. Games without spectators are excluded from calculatind average attendance.)
Home colours	Away colours	Third colours

The 2021–22 season was the 124th season in the existence of SK Rapid Wien and the club's 73rd consecutive season in the top flight of Austrian football. In addition to the domestic league, Rapid Wien participated in this season's edition of the Austrian Cup and entered international football in the second qualifying round to the UEFA Champions League having finished 2nd in the previous Bundesliga season.

== Squad ==
=== Squad statistics ===
No.	Nat.	Name	Age	League		Austrian Cup		UEFA Competitions		Total		Discipline		
No.	Nat.	Name	Age	Apps	Goals	Apps	Goals	Apps	Goals	Apps	Goals	Yellow card	(yellow card) (red card)	Red card
Goalkeepers
1	(Austria)	Richard Strebinger	28	6		1		5		12		2		
21	(Austria)	Bernhard Unger	22	0+1						0+1				
25	(Austria)	Paul Gartler	24	18+1		3		8		29+1		2		
45	(Austria)	Niklas Hedl	20	10				1		11				1
Defenders
4	(Austria)	Emanuel Aiwu	20	23+2	2	3		8		34+2	2	11		
6	(Austria)	Kevin Wimmer	28	18+2	1	1		4+5		23+7	1	10		
17	(Austria)	Christopher Dibon	30	2+1				0+1		2+2				
20	(Austria)	Maximilian Hofmann	27	14		3	1	9	1	26	2	9		
22	(Montenegro)	Filip Stojković	28	25	2	4		9+1		38+1	2	10	1	
23	(Austria)	Jonas Auer	20	12+11	1	2+2		2+5		16+18	1	2		
26	(Austria)	Martin Moormann	20	17+2		1+1		5		23+3		5		
30	(Austria)	Leo Greiml	19	11		1		8	1	20	1	8		
31	(Austria)	Maximilian Ullmann	25	14		2+1	1	11		27+1	1	5		
33	(Austria)	Marko Dijakovic	19	0+2				0+1		0+3				
37	(Austria)	Lukas Sulzbacher	21	0+1		0+1		0+2		0+4		1		
43	(Austria)	Leopold Querfeld	17	2+3				0+2		2+5				
54	(Austria)	Pascal Fallmann	17	1+2						1+2				
55	(Democratic Republic of the Congo)	Aristot Tambwe-Kasengele	17	0+1						0+1				
Midfielders
5	(Austria)	Robert Ljubičić	21	26+1	3	2		10+1	1	38+2	4	5		1
7	(Austria)	Philipp Schobesberger	27	0+4				0+1		0+5				
8	(Austria)	Christoph Knasmüllner	29	18+10	3	2+2	2	6+6	3	26+18	8	3		
10	(Austria)	Yusuf Demir	18	6+5	1	0+1		2		8+6	1	2		
13	(Austria)	Thorsten Schick	31	18+11		3+1		4+7		25+19		9		
14	(Bosnia and Herzegovina)	Srđan Grahovac	28	15+8	1	1+2	2	9+3		25+13	3	7		
16	(Slovenia)	Dejan Petrovič	23	17+4		2+1		5+5		24+10		1		
28	(Austria)	Moritz Oswald	19	3+7						3+7				
35	(Austria)	Benjamin Kanuric	18	0+2						0+2				
36	(Austria)	Kelvin Arase	22	9+14	1	1+2		11+1		21+17	1	2		
42	(Austria)	Lion Schuster	20	2+2				1+4		3+6		2		
46	(Austria)	Denis Bosnjak	24	0+1				0+1		0+2		1		
47	(Austria)	Dalibor Velimirovic	20			0+1				0+1			1	
Forwards
9	(Greece)	Taxiarchis Fountas	25	14+3	7	3	1	9+2	3	26+5	11	3		
10	(Austria)	Thierno Ballo	19	4+4		1+1		0+3		5+8		1		
18	(Austria)	Oliver Strunz	21	0+4		1+2		0+3		1+9		1		
27	(Austria)	Marco Grüll	23	31+2	9	3+1	2	12+2	5	46+5	16	12		
29	(Austria)	Ercan Kara	25	16+1	9	3	2	11+1	3	30+2	14	1		
32	(Japan)	Koya Kitagawa	24	1+12		1+1		2+7		4+20		2		
38	(Netherlands)	Ferdy Druijf	23	9+1	5	0+1		2	1	11+2	6	3		
41	(Austria)	Bernhard Zimmermann	19	12+1	5					12+1	5	2	1	
53	(Serbia)	Dragoljub Savić	20	0+5	1					0+5	1			
57	(Austria)	Nicolas Binder	19	0+7	1					0+7	1			

=== Goal scorers ===
Name	Bundesliga	Cup	International	Total
(Austria) Marco Grüll	9	2	5	16
(Austria) Ercan Kara	9	2	3	14
(Greece) Taxiarchis Fountas	7	1	3	11
(Austria) Christoph Knasmüllner	3	2	3	8
(Netherlands) Ferdy Druijf	5		1	6
(Austria) Bernhard Zimmermann	5			5
(Austria) Robert Ljubičić	3		1	4
(Bosnia and Herzegovina) Srđan Grahovac	1	2		3
(Austria) Emanuel Aiwu	2			2
(Austria) Maximilian Hofmann		1	1	2
(Montenegro) Filip Stojković	2			2
(Austria) Kelvin Arase	1			1
(Austria) Jonas Auer	1			1
(Austria) Nicolas Binder	1			1
(Austria) Yusuf Demir	1			1
(Austria) Leo Greiml			1	1
(Serbia) Dragoljub Savić	1			1
(Austria) Maximilian Ullmann		1		1
(Austria) Kevin Wimmer	1			1
Own goals
(Austria) Günther Arnberger (Wiener Viktoria)		1		1
Totals	52	12	18	82

=== Disciplinary record ===
Name	Bundesliga			Cup			International			Total		
Name	Yellow card	(yellow card) (red card)	Red card	Yellow card	(yellow card) (red card)	Red card	Yellow card	(yellow card) (red card)	Red card	Yellow card	(yellow card) (red card)	Red card
(Austria) Marco Grüll	8			1			3			12		
(Montenegro) Filip Stojković	7						3	1		10	1	
(Austria) Emanuel Aiwu	8			1			2			11		
(Austria) Kevin Wimmer	6						4			10		
(Austria) Maximilian Hofmann	6						3			9		
(Austria) Thorsten Schick	7						2			9		
(Austria) Leo Greiml	3						5			8		
(Bosnia and Herzegovina) Srđan Grahovac	3						4			7		
(Austria) Robert Ljubičić	4		1				1			5		1
(Austria) Martin Moormann	4						1			5		
(Austria) Maximilian Ullmann	1			1			3			5		
(Austria) Bernhard Zimmermann	2	1								2	1	
(Netherlands) Ferdy Druijf	1			1			1			3		
(Greece) Taxiarchis Fountas	3									3		
(Austria) Christoph Knasmüllner	2						1			3		
(Austria) Kelvin Arase	1						1			2		
(Austria) Jonas Auer	2									2		
(Austria) Yusuf Demir	1						1			2		
(Austria) Paul Gartler							2			2		
(Japan) Koya Kitagawa				1			1			2		
(Austria) Lion Schuster	1						1			2		
(Austria) Richard Strebinger							2			2		
(Austria) Niklas Hedl			1									1
(Austria) Dalibor Velimirovic					1						1	
(Austria) Thierno Ballo	1									1		
(Austria) Denis Bosnjak	1									1		
(Austria) Ercan Kara	1									1		
(Slovenia) Dejan Petrovič				1						1		
(Austria) Oliver Strunz							1			1		
(Austria) Lukas Sulzbacher							1			1		
Totals	73	1	2	6	1		43	1		122	3	2

=== Transfers ===
==== In ====
Pos.	Nat.	Name	Age	Moved from	Type	Transfer Window	Ref.
FW	(Austria)	Marco Grüll	22	(Austria) SV Ried	Free transfer	Summer	
MF	(Austria)	Robert Ljubicic	21	(Austria) SKN St. Pölten	Free Transfer	Summer	
DF	(Austria)	Kevin Wimmer	28	(England) Stoke City F.C.	Free transfer	Summer	
DF	(Austria)	Jonas Auer	20	(Czech Republic) FK Mladá Boleslav	Transfer	Summer	
DF	(Austria)	Emanuel Aiwu	20	(Austria) FC Admira Wacker Mödling	Transfer	Summer	
FW	(Austria)	Thierno Ballo	19	(England) Chelsea F.C.	Loan	Summer	
FW	(Austria)	Yusuf Demir	18	(Spain) FC Barcelona	Loan return	Winter	
FW	(Netherlands)	Ferdy Druijf	23	(Netherlands) AZ Alkmaar	Loan	Winter	

==== Out ====
Pos.	Nat.	Name	Age	Moved to	Type	Transfer Window	Ref.
MF	(Hungary)	Tamás Szántó	25		End of career	Summer	
MF	(Austria)	Dejan Ljubicic	23	(Germany) 1. FC Köln	Free transfer	Summer	
DF	(Austria)	Mario Sonnleitner	34	(Austria) TSV Hartberg	Free transfer	Summer	
DF	(Croatia)	Mateo Barać	26	(Russia) PFC Sochi	Free transfer	Summer	
MF	(Austria)	Marcel Ritzmaier	28	(England) Barnsley F.C.	Loan return	Summer	
FW	(Austria)	Deni Alar	31	(Austria) SKN St. Pölten	Free transfer	Summer	
FW	(Austria)	Yusuf Demir	18	(Spain) FC Barcelona	Loan	Summer	
DF	(Austria)	Maximilian Ullmann	25	(Italy) Venezia F.C.	Transfer	Winter	
FW	(Austria)	Ercan Kara	26	(United States) Orlando City SC	Transfer	Winter	
FW	(Austria)	Thierno Ballo	20	(England) Chelsea F.C.	Loan return	Winter	
GK	(Austria)	Richard Strebinger	29	(Poland) Legia Warsaw	Transfer	Winter	
FW	(Greece)	Taxiarchis Fountas	26	(United States) D.C. United	Transfer	Winter	
DF	(Montenegro)	Filip Stojković	29	Free agent	Contract termination	during season	

== Pre-season and friendlies ==
Win Draw Loss Fixtures

26 June 2021 Friendly	SV Lafnitz	2–5	Rapid Wien	Rohrbach an der Lafnitz, Austria
17:00	Kröpfl 42' (pen.) 70'		Fountas 6'; Knasmüllner 30'; Dijakovic 47'; Kitagawa 66'; Schick 72'	Stadium: Stadion Rohrbach; Attendance: 200

30 June 2021 Friendly	SV Oberwart	0–3	Rapid Wien	Oberwart, Austria
18:00			Kitagawa 18'; Grüll 49'; Fountas 79' (pen.)	Stadium: Informstadion; Attendance: 1,100

3 July 2021 Friendly	Rapid Wien	0–0	Lokomotiv Moscow	Pinkafeld, Austria
16:30				Attendance: 550

7 July 2021 Friendly	Rapid Wien	2–2	SKN St. Pölten	Vienna, Austria
17:00	Fountas 65'; Kara 76'		Gschweidl 10'; Vucenovic 51'	Stadium: Allianz Stadion

10 July 2021 Friendly	Rapid Wien	1–0	Copenhagen	Vienna, Austria
18:30	Kara 65'			Stadium: Allianz Stadion; Attendance: 7,500

13 January 2022 Friendly	Rapid Wien	4–0	SV Lafnitz	Vienna, Austria
15:00	Petrovič 5' (pen.); Grüll 48'; Fountas 50'; Auer 86'

13 January 2022 Friendly	Rapid Wien	2–4	Vorwärts Steyr	Vienna, Austria
17:00	Zimmermann 1' 74'		Günes 13'; Prada 40'; Martin 50' 65'

19 January 2022 Friendly	Rapid Wien	2–1	Cracovia	Belek, Turkey
12:00	Kitagawa 30'; Oswald 85'		van Amersfoort 47' (pen.); Rakoczy (red card) 66'

22 January 2022 Friendly	Rapid Wien	1–2	Pogoń Szczecin	Belek, Turkey
13:00	Grüll 31'		Łęgowski 65'; Parzyszek 78'

22 January 2022 Friendly	Rapid Wien	1–2	FK Teplice	Belek, Turkey
15:00	Knasmüllner 73'		Trubač 62'; Kodad 87'

29 January 2022 Friendly	Rapid Wien	1–0	AS Trenčín	Vienna, Austria
14:00	Grüll 14' (pen.)			Stadium: Allianz Stadion

== Competitions ==
=== Overall record ===
Competition	First match	Last match	Starting round	Final position	Record							
Competition	First match	Last match	Starting round	Final position	Pld	W	D	L	GF	GA	GD	Win %
Austrian Football Bundesliga	24 July 2021	29 May 2022		5th	34	12	11	11	52	45	+7	35.29
Austrian Cup	16 July 2021	5 February 2022	Round 1	Quarterfinals	4	3	0	1	12	3	+9	75.00
Champions League	20 July 2021	28 July 2021	Second qualifying round	Second qualifying round	2	1	0	1	2	3	−1	50.00
Europa League	5 August 2021	9 December 2021	Third qualifying round	Group stage	10	5	0	5	14	13	+1	50.00
Conference League	17 February 2022	24 February 2022	Knockout round play-offs	Knockout round play-offs	2	1	0	1	2	3	−1	50.00
Total					52	22	11	19	82	67	+15	42.31

Last updated: 29 May 2022
Source: Soccerway

=== Austrian Football Bundesliga ===
==== Results summary ====
Overall								Home						Away					
Pld	W	D	L	GF	GA	GD	Pts	W	D	L	GF	GA	GD	W	D	L	GF	GA	GD
34	12	11	11	52	45	+7	47	8	4	5	29	19	+10	4	7	6	23	26	−3

Last updated: 29 May 2022.
Source: Austrian Football Bundesliga

==== Results by round ====
Round	1	2	3	4	5	6	7	8	9	10	11	12	13	14	15	16	17	18	19	20	21	22	23	24	25	26	27	28	29	30	31	32
Ground	H	A	H	A	H	A	H	A	H	H	A	A	H	A	H	A	H	A	H	A	A	H	A	H	A	H	A	H	H	A	H	A
Result	L	D	W	L	W	D	L	L	L	W	D	D	W	L	W	D	D	W	L	D	W	W	W	D	L	W	L	D	D	D	L	L
Position	12	12	6	10	3	4	9	9	11	8	8	10	5	7	5	8	5	5	5	7	6	5	5	4	4	3	3	3	3	3	4	5

Updated to match(es) played on 15 May 2022. Source: Austrian Football Bundesliga
A = Away; H = Home; W = Win; D = Draw; L = Loss

==== Regular season ====
The league fixtures were announced on 24 July 2021.

===== Table =====
Austrian Bundesliga regular season table
Pos	Team	Pld	W	D	L	GF	GA	GD	Pts	Qualification
3	Wolfsberger AC	22	11	4	7	34	32	+2	37	Qualification for the Championship round
4	Austria Wien	22	8	9	5	31	23	+8	33	Qualification for the Championship round
5	Rapid Wien	22	8	7	7	35	31	+4	31	Qualification for the Championship round
6	Austria Klagenfurt	22	7	9	6	31	33	−2	30	Qualification for the Championship round
7	Ried	22	7	8	7	31	41	−10	29	Qualification for the Relegation round

Source: Austrian Football Bundesliga
Rules for classification: 1) Points; 2) Head-to-head record; 3) Goal difference; 4) Goals scored; 5) Matches won; 6) Away matches won; 7) Away goals scored.

===== Matches =====
24 July 2021 1	Rapid Wien	0–2	Hartberg	Vienna
17:00		Report	Tadić 40' 67' (pen.)	Stadium: Allianz Stadium; Attendance: 12,200; Referee: Manuel Schüttengruber

31 July 2021 2	LASK	1–1	Rapid Wien	Pasching
17:00	Schmidt 79'	Report	Fountas 8'	Stadium: Raiffeisen Arena; Attendance: 6,090; Referee: Rene Eisner

8 August 2021 3	Rapid Wien	3–0	WAC	Vienna
17:00	Fountas 22' 52' 53'	Report		Stadium: Allianz Stadium; Attendance: 13,100; Referee: Alexander Harkam

15 August 2021 4	Altach	2–1	Rapid Wien	Altach
17:00	Nussbaumer 82'; Nuhiu 90+1' (pen.)	Report	Grüll 58'	Stadium: Cashpoint Arena; Attendance: 4,837; Referee: Alan Kijas

22 August 2021 5	Rapid Wien	3–0	Ried	Vienna
17:00	Grüll 42'; Kara 72'; Ljubičić 81'	Report		Stadium: Allianz Stadium; Attendance: 14,500; Referee: Christopher Jäger

29 August 2021 6	Austria Wien	1–1	Rapid Wien	Vienna
17:00	Mühl 33'	Report	Grüll 47'	Stadium: Generali Arena; Attendance: 10,851; Referee: Harald Lechner

11 September 2021 7	Rapid Wien	1–2	Admira	Vienna
17:00	Grahovac 45'	Report	Kerschbaum 51'; Zwierschitz 86'	Stadium: Allianz Stadium; Attendance: 16,600; Referee: Stefan Ebner

19 September 2021 8	Red Bull	2–0	Rapid Wien	Wals-Siezenheim
17:00	Adeyemi 79' (pen.); Aaronson 90+4'	Report		Stadium: Red Bull Arena; Attendance: 17,218; Referee: Markus Hameter

26 September 2021 9	Rapid Wien	0–3	Sturm	Vienna
17:00		Report	Yeboah 38'; Gorenc Stanković 71'; Ljubic 82'	Stadium: Allianz Stadium; Attendance: 16,900; Referee: Sebastian Gishamer

3 October 2021 10	Rapid Wien	5–2	WSG Tirol	Vienna
14:30	Kara 45+2' 46' 60' (pen.); Grüll 78'; Knasmüllner 90+3'	Report	Sabitzer 37'; Behounek (red card) 65'; Petsos 82'	Stadium: Allianz Stadium; Attendance: 10,200; Referee: Christopher Jäger

16 October 2021 11	Austria Klagenfurt	1–1	Rapid Wien	Klagenfurt
17:00	Mahrer (red card) 21'; Amanda 87'	Report	Fountas 37'	Stadium: Wörthersee Stadion; Attendance: 7,493; Referee: Rene Eisner

24 October 2021 12	Hartberg	1–1	Rapid Wien	Hartberg
14:30	Rotter 90+7'	Report	Fountas 11'	Stadium: Profertil Arena; Attendance: 4,500; Referee: Sebastian Gishamer

31 October 2021 13	Rapid Wien	3–2	LASK	Vienna
17:00	Kara 41' 78'; Grüll 86'; Ljubicic (red card) 90+7'	Report	Goiginger 17'; Luckeneder 89'	Stadium: Allianz Stadium; Attendance: 11,900; Referee: Alan Kijas

7 November 2021 14	WAC	4–1	Rapid Wien	Wolfsberg
17:00	Jasic 22'; Gugganig 31'; Dieng 45+1'; Peretz 63'	Report	Aiwu 33'	Stadium: Lavanttal-Arena; Attendance: 3,551; Referee: Alexander Harkam

20 November 2021 15	Rapid Wien	1–0	Altach	Vienna
17:00	Stojković 47'; Kara (penalty missed)	Report	Bischof (red card) 59'	Stadium: Allianz Stadium; Attendance: 8,900; Referee: Manuel Schüttengruber

28 November 2021 16	Ried	2–2	Rapid Wien	Ried im Innkreis
17:00	Stojković 26' (o.g.); Mikić 71'	Report	Kara 11'; Knasmüllner 84'	Stadium: Josko Arena; Attendance: – Referee: Christopher Jäger

5 December 2021 17	Rapid Wien	1–1	Austria Wien	Vienna
17:00	Kara 25' (pen.)	Report	Braunöder 1'	Stadium: Allianz Stadium; Attendance: – Referee: Walter Altmann

12 December 2021 18	Admira	1–2	Rapid Wien	Maria Enzersdorf
14:30	Zwierschitz 18'	Report	Fountas 14'; Kara 63'	Stadium: BSFZ-Arena; Attendance: 3,500; Referee: Sebastian Gishammer

11 February 2022 19	Rapid Wien	1–2	Red Bull	Vienna
17:00	Stojković 18'	Report	Aaronson 64'; Okafor 77'	Stadium: Allianz Stadium; Attendance: 2,000; Referee: Manuel Schüttengruber

20 February 2022 20	Sturm	2–2	Rapid Wien	Graz
17:00	Højlund 6'; Jantscher 69' (pen.)		Aiwu 35'; Wimmer 83'	Stadium: Merkur Arena; Attendance: 13,200; Referee: Walter Altmann

27 February 2022 21	WSG Tirol	0–2	Rapid Wien	Innsbruck
17:00		Report	Grüll 7'; Arase 23'	Stadium: Tivoli; Attendance: 2,200; Referee: Stefan Ebner

6 March 2022 22	Rapid Wien	3–0	Austria Klagenfurt	Vienna
17:00	Zimmermann 15' 57'; Druijf 90+5'	Report		Stadium: Allianz Stadium; Attendance: 20,400; Referee: Rene Eisner

==== Championship round ====
===== Table =====
Pos	Team	Pld	W	D	L	GF	GA	GD	Pts	Qualification	RBS	STU	AWI	WOL	RWI	KLA
2	Sturm Graz	32	16	8	8	62	46	+16	37	Qualification for the Champions League third qualifying round	2–1	—	1–0	1–4	2–1	3–1
3	Austria Wien	32	11	13	8	44	39	+5	29	Qualification for the Europa League play-off round	1–2	4–2	—	2–1	1–1	1–1
4	Wolfsberger AC	32	14	5	13	48	53	−5	28	Qualification for the Europa Conference League third qualifying round	1–4	0–2	1–1	—	2–1	1–2
5	Rapid Wien (O)	32	10	11	11	48	45	+3	25	Qualification for the Europa Conference League play-offs	0–1	1–1	1–1	2–1	—	2–2
6	Austria Klagenfurt	32	8	12	12	43	57	−14	21		0–6	1–2	1–2	2–3	1–3	—

Legend: Blue = home team win; Yellow = draw; Red = away team win.
Rules for classification: 1) Points; 2) Points with (possible) half points subtracted due to rounding; 3) Head-to-head points; 4) Head-to-head goal difference; 5) Head-to-head goals scored; 6) Head-to-head away goals scored; 7) Goal difference; 8) Goals scored; 9) Matches won; 10) Away matches won; 11) Away goals scored.
(O) Play-off winners

Points were halved after the regular season.

===== Matches =====
13 March 2022 23	Austria Klagenfurt	1–3	Rapid Wien	Klagenfurt
14:30	Gemicibaşi 41' (pen.) (yellow card) (red card) 53'	Report	Grüll 27'; Zimmermann 35'; Demir 49'	Stadium: Wörthersee Stadion; Attendance: 5,709; Referee: Markus Hameter

20 March 2022 24	Rapid Wien	1–1	Austria Wien	Vienna
17:00	Ljubičić 14'	Report	Djuricin 28'	Stadium: Allianz Stadium; Attendance: 26,000; Referee: Manuel Schüttengruber

3 April 2022 25	Red Bull	2–1	Rapid Wien	Wals-Siezenheim
17:00	Sučić 17'; Junuzović 90+4'		Druijf 52'	Stadium: Red Bull Arena; Attendance: 15,217; Referee: Alexander Harkam

10 April 2022 26	Rapid Wien	2–1	WAC	Vienna
14:30	Zimmermann 38'; Savić 81'	Report	Taferner 75'	Stadium: Allianz Stadium; Attendance: 16,200; Referee: Walter Altmann

17 April 2022 27	Sturm	2–1	Rapid Wien	Graz
14:30	Jantscher 25'; Højlund 61'	Report	Druijf 90+1'	Stadium: Merkur Arena; Referee: Alan Kijas

24 April 2022 28	Rapid Wien	1–1	Sturm	Vienna
17:00	Knasmüllner 89'	Report	Sarkaria 75' (pen.); Wüthrich (yellow card) (red card) 82'	Stadium: Allianz Stadium; Attendance: 20,200; Referee: Sebastian Gishammer

27 April 2022 29	Rapid Wien	2–2	Austria Klagenfurt	Vienna
18:30	Druijf 78' 88'; Hedl (red card) 80'		Jaritz 70'; Gemicibaşi 84' (pen.)	Stadium: Allianz Stadium; Attendance: 13,400; Referee: Christian-Petru Ciochirca

8 May 2022 30	Austria Wien	1–1	Rapid Wien	Vienna
17:00	Ohio 81'	Report	Zimmermann 37' (yellow card) (red card) 58'	Stadium: Generali Arena; Attendance: 13,700; Referee: Christopher Jäger

15 May 2022 31	Rapid Wien	0–1	Red Bull	Vienna
17:00		Report	Sučić 10'	Stadium: Allianz Stadium; Attendance: 23,400; Referee: Stefan Ebner

21 May 2022 32	WAC	2–1	Rapid Wien	Wolfsberg
17:00	Baribo 74'; Jasic 76'	Report	Grüll 36'	Stadium: Lavanttal-Arena; Attendance: 6,352; Referee: Manuel Schüttengruber

==== Europa Conference League play-off ====
===== Final =====
26 May 2022 First leg	WSG Tirol	1–2	Rapid Wien	Innsbruck
17:00	Vrioni 27'; Schulz (yellow card) (red card) 89'	Report	Grüll 10'; Auer 14'	Stadium: Tivoli Stadion Tirol; Attendance: 6,000; Referee: Sebastian Gishammer

29 May 2022 Second leg	Rapid Wien	2–0 (4–1 agg.)	WSG Tirol	Vienna
17:00	Ljubičić 29'; Binder 87'	Report		Stadium: Allianz Stadion; Attendance: 10,400; Referee: Stefan Ebner

=== Austrian Cup ===
16 July 2021 1st round	Rapid Wien	6–0	Wiener Viktoria	Vienna
20:30	Kara 9' (pen.); Hofmann 41'; Grahovac 58'; Arnberger 61' (o.g.); Knasmüllner 65'; Grüll 89' (pen.)	Report	Petrovic (yellow card) (red card) 29'	Stadium: Allianz Stadion; Attendance: 8,100; Referee: Harald Lechner

23 September 2021 2nd round	Admira Wacker	1–2 (a.e.t.)	Rapid Wien	Maria Enzersdorf
20:30	Mustapha 66'	Report	Ullmann 39'; Grüll 109' (pen.)	Stadium: BSFZ-Arena; Attendance: 4,130; Referee: Manuel Schüttengruber

28 October 2021 Round of 16	SKU Amstetten	0–3	Rapid Wien	Amstetten
18:00		Report	Kara 13'; Fountas 27'; Grahovac 55'	Stadium: Ertl Glas Stadion; Attendance: 2,797; Referee: Walter Altmann

5 February 2022 Quarterfinal	Rapid Wien	1–2	TSV Hartberg	Vienna
16:30	Knasmüllner 7'; Velimirovic (yellow card) (red card) 78'	Report	Heil 24'; Sturm 45+2'	Stadium: Allianz Stadion; Attendance: 2,000; Referee: Christopher Jäger

=== UEFA Champions League ===
==== Second qualifying round ====
The draw for the second qualifying round was held on 16 June 2021.

20 July 2021 First leg	Rapid Wien (Austria)	2–1	(Czech Republic) Sparta Prague	Vienna, Austria
20:30	Knasmüllner 63' 71'	Report	Krejčí II 3'	Stadium: Allianz Stadion; Attendance: 19,500; Referee: Serdar Gözübüyük (Netherlands)

28 July 2021 Second leg	Sparta Prague (Czech Republic)	2–0 (3–2 agg.)	(Austria) Rapid Wien	Prague, Czechia
20:30	Moberg Karlsson 16' (pen.); Pešek 81'	Report		Stadium: Stadion Letná; Attendance: 9,105; Referee: Bobby Madden (Scotland)

=== UEFA Europa League ===
==== Third qualifying round ====
5 August 2021 First leg	Rapid Wien (Austria)	3–0	(Cyprus) Anorthosis Famagusta	Vienna, Austria
20:30	Kara 35'; Knasmüllner (penalty missed); Fountas 65'; Grüll 83'	Report		Stadium: Allianz Stadion; Attendance: 11,400; Referee: Maurizio Mariani (Italy)

12 August 2021 Second leg	Anorthosis Famagusta (Cyprus)	2–1 (2–4 agg.)	(Austria) Rapid Wien	Larnaca, Cyprus
19:00	Lafferty 45+1'; Roushias 88'	Report	Kara 64'	Stadium: Antonis Papadopoulos Stadium; Attendance: 3,574; Referee: Aleksandar Stavrev (North Macedonia)

==== Play-off round ====
19 August 2021 First leg	Rapid Wien (Austria)	3–0	(Ukraine) Zorya Luhansk	Vienna, Austria
21:00	Fountas 29'; Kara 78'; Grüll 86'	Report		Stadium: Allianz Stadion; Attendance: 10,300; Referee: Sandro Schärer (Switzerland)

26 August 2021 Second leg	Zorya Luhansk (Ukraine)	2–3 (2–6 agg.)	(Austria) Rapid Wien	Zaporizhzhia, Ukraine
18:30	Hladkyy 40'; Zahedi 87' (pen.)	Report	Grüll 10'; Greiml 15'; Fountas 68'	Stadium: Slavutych-Arena; Attendance: 2,563; Referee: István Kovács (Romania)

==== Group stage ====
The draw for the group stage was held on 27 August 2021.

===== Table =====
Pos	Team	Pld	W	D	L	GF	GA	GD	Pts	Qualification	WHU	DZA	RWI	GNK
1	(England) West Ham United	6	4	1	1	11	3	+8	13	Advance to round of 16	—	0–1	2–0	3–0
2	(Croatia) Dinamo Zagreb	6	3	1	2	9	6	+3	10	Advance to knockout round play-offs	0–2	—	3–1	1–1
3	(Austria) Rapid Wien	6	2	0	4	4	9	−5	6	Transfer to Europa Conference League	0–2	2–1	—	0–1
4	(Belgium) Genk	6	1	2	3	4	10	−6	5		2–2	0–3	0–1	—

Source: UEFA
Rules for classification: Group stage tiebreakers

===== Games =====
16 September 2021 1	Rapid Wien (Austria)	0–1	(Belgium) Genk	Vienna
18:45		Report	Onuachu 90+2'	Stadium: Allianz Stadion; Attendance: 18,400; Referee: Kristo Tohver (Estonia)

30 September 2021 2	West Ham United (England)	2–0	(Austria) Rapid Wien	London
21:00	Rice 29'; Benrahma 90+4'	Report		Stadium: London Stadium; Attendance: 50,000; Referee: Tobias Stieler (Germany)

21 October 2021 3	Rapid Wien (Austria)	2–1	(Croatia) Dinamo Zagreb	Vienna
18:45	Grüll 9'; Hofmann 34'	Report	Oršić 24'	Stadium: Allianz Stadion; Attendance: 22,300; Referee: Kateryna Monzul (Ukraine)

4 November 2021 4	Dinamo Zagreb (Croatia)	3–1	(Austria) Rapid Wien	Zagreb
21:00	Petković 12'; Andrić 34'; Šutalo 83'	Report	Knasmüllner 8'	Stadium: Stadion Maksimir; Attendance: 7,835; Referee: John Beaton (Scotland)

25 November 2021 5	Rapid Wien (Austria)	0–2	(England) West Ham United	Vienna
18:45		Report	Yarmolenko 40'; Noble 45+2' (pen.)	Stadium: Allianz Stadion; Attendance: – Referee: Sergey Ivanov (Russia)

9 December 2021 6	Genk (Belgium)	0–1	(Austria) Rapid Wien	Genk
21:00		Report	Ljubičić 29'	Stadium: Luminus Arena; Attendance: 10,018; Referee: Tiago Martins (Portugal)

=== UEFA Europa Conference League ===
==== Knockout round play-offs ====
17 February 2022 First leg	Rapid Wien (Austria)	2–1	(Netherlands) Vitesse	Vienna, Austria
18:45	Druijf 1'; Grüll 16'; Stojković (yellow card) (red card) 65'	Report	Openda 74'	Stadium: Allianz Stadion; Attendance: 10,700; Referee: Donatas Rumšas (Lithuania)

24 February 2022 Second leg	Vitesse (Netherlands)	2–0 (3–2 agg.)	(Austria) Rapid Wien	Arnhem, Netherlands
21:00	Grbić 3'; Bero 19'	Report		Stadium: GelreDome; Referee: Jakob Kehlet (Denmark)
