= 2020–21 SK Rapid Wien season =

Rapid Wien
2020–21 season
- President: Michael Krammer
- Head Coach: Dietmar Kühbauer
- Stadium: Allianz Stadion, Vienna, Austria
- Bundesliga: 2nd (championship round); 2nd (regular season)
- Austrian Cup: Third round
- UEFA Champions League: Third qualifying round
- UEFA Europa League: Group stage (3rd)
- Top goalscorer: League: Ercan Kara (15); All: Ercan Kara (20)
- Highest home attendance: 10,000 vs. FC Admira Wacker Mödling, 11 September 2020 (Note: Due to COVID-19 no or a limited number of spectators were allowed. Games without spectators are excluded from calculatind average attendance.)
- Lowest home attendance: 1,500 vs. SC Rheindorf Altach, 1 November 2020
- Average home league attendance: 4,375
Home colours	Away colours	European home colours

The 2020–21 SK Rapid Wien season was the 123rd season in club history.

== Bundesliga ==
=== League table ===
==== Regular season ====
Pos	Team	Pld	W	D	L	GF	GA	GD	Pts	Qualification
1	Red Bull Salzburg	22	17	1	4	67	24	+43	52	Qualification for the Championship round
2	Rapid Wien	22	13	6	3	43	25	+18	45	Qualification for the Championship round
3	LASK	22	13	3	6	42	21	+21	42	Qualification for the Championship round
4	Sturm Graz	22	11	6	5	34	20	+14	39	Qualification for the Championship round
5	Wolfsberger AC	22	10	3	9	40	39	+1	33	Qualification for the Championship round

Source: Austrian Football Bundesliga
Rules for classification: 1) Points; 2) Goal difference; 3) Goals scored; 4) Matches won; 5) Away matches won; 6) Head-to-head points; 7) Head-to-head goal difference; 8) Head-to-head goals scored.

=== Results summary ===
Overall								Home						Away					
Pld	W	D	L	GF	GA	GD	Pts	W	D	L	GF	GA	GD	W	D	L	GF	GA	GD
32	17	8	7	64	40	+24	59	10	3	3	32	14	+18	7	5	4	32	26	+6

=== Bundesliga fixtures and results ===
Win Draw Loss

MD	Date – KO	Opponent	Venue	Result F–A	Attendance	Goalscorers and disciplined players		Table			Ref.
MD	Date – KO	Opponent	Venue	Result F–A	Attendance	Rapid Wien	Opponent	Pos.	Pts.	GD	Ref.
1	11 September 2020 18:30	Admira Wacker Mödling	H	4–1	10,000	Murg 8'; Fountas 43' 73'; Kitagawa 90+2'	Hausjell 80'	1st	3	+3	
2	19 September 2020 17:00	Sturm Graz	A	1–1	2,812	Demir 68'	Stanković 52'	3rd	4	+3	
3	26 September 2020 17:00	St. Pölten	A	2–1	1,563	Fountas 15'; Kara 17' (pen.)	Hugi 6'	2nd	7	+4	
4	4 October 2020 17:00	LASK	H	3–0	3,000	Murg 7'; Fountas 22'; Kara 90+3'	Ramsebner (red card) 66'	2nd	10	+7	
5	25 October 2020 17:00	Wolfsberger AC	A	4–3	1,500	Schick 25'; Kitagawa 35'; Kara 76' 90+3' (pen.)	Baumgartner 47' 53'; Dieng 67'	2nd	13	+8	
6	1 November 2020 14:30	Rheindorf Altach	H	3–1	1,500	Knasmüllner 22'; Kitagawa 54'; Ritzmaier 81'	Stefel 83'	2nd	16	+10	
7	8 November 2020 17:00	Red Bull Salzburg	H	1–1	–	Knasmüllner 85'	Koita 29'	2nd	17	+10	
8	22 November 2020 17:00	Ried	A	3–4	–	Knasmüllner 14' 51'; Reiner 65' (o.g.)	Grahovac 25' (o.g.); Gschweidl 40'; Reiner 71'; Grüll 87'	3rd	17	+9	
9	29 November 2020 17:00	Austria Wien	H	1–1	–	Schick 8'	Wimmer 19'	3rd	18	+9	
10	6 December 2020 14:30	Hartberg	A	3–1	–	Arase 2' 76'; Kara 35'	Rotter 66'	3rd	21	+11	
11	13 December 2020 14:30	WSG Tirol	H	0–3	–	Stojković (red card) 49'	Schnegg 5'; Petsos 29'; Baden Frederiksen 90'	4th	21	+8	
12	19 December 2020 17:00	Admira Wacker Mödling	A	1–0	–	Kara 20'		4th	24	+9	
13	22 January 2021 19:00	Sturm Graz	H	4–1	–	Kara 7'; Schick 43'; Knasmüllner 50'; Demir 88'	Jantscher 31'; Balaj (red card) 71'	2nd	27	+12	
14	27 January 2021 18:30	St. Pölten	H	2–1	–	Knasmüllner 16'; Kara 66'	Schmidt 14'	2nd	30	+13	
15	31 January 2021 17:00	LASK	A	2–1	–	Grahovac 19'; Knasmüllner 23'	Holland 21'	2nd	33	+14	
16	9 February 2021 20:30	Wolfsberger AC	H	1–0	–	Kara 32'		2nd	36	+15	
17	13 February 2021 17:00	Rheindorf Altach	A	0–0	–		Schreiner (yellow card) (red card) 23'	2nd	37	+15	
18	21 February 2021 17:00	Red Bull Salzburg	A	2–4	–	Schuster 90+1'; Kara 90+4'	Daka 30' 64' 70'; Adeyemi 90+2'	2nd	37	+13	
19	27 January 2021 17:00	Ried	H	1–0	–	Demir 90'	Boateng (yellow card) (red card) 62'	2nd	40	+14	
20	7 March 2021 17:00	Austria Wien	A	0–0	–			2nd	41	+14	
21	14 March 2021 17:00	Hartberg	H	4–0	–	Kara 34' 49'; Knasmüllner 69'; Alar 88'		2nd	44	+18	
22	21 March 2021 17:00	WSG Tirol	A	1–1	–	Arase 74'; Kara (penalty missed)	Anselm 84'	2nd	45 (Note: Points were halved after regular season.)	+18	
Championship round
23	4 April 2021 14:30	Wolfsberger AC	A	8–1	–	Fountas 22' 58' 61'; Kara 32'; Ullmann 57'; Scherzer 70' (o.g.) 84' (o.g.); Demir 78'	Lochoshvili (red card) 29'; Röcher 39'	2nd	25	+25	
24	11 April 2021 17:00	Red Bull Salzburg	H	0–3	–	Hofmann (red card) 46'	Ramalho 36'; Adeyemi 90+3' 90+5'	2nd	25	+22	
25	18 April 2021 17:00	Sturm Graz	H	0–0	–		Yeboah (red card) 39'	2nd	26	+22	
26	21 April 2021 20:30	LASK	A	1–1	–	Knasmüllner 71'	Goiginger 63'	2nd	27	+22	
27	25 April 2021 14:30	WSG Tirol	H	4–0	–	Behounek 21' (o.g.); Demir 81' 84'; Kara 86'		2nd	30	+26	
28	28 April 2021 18:30	WSG Tirol	A	3–2	–	Knasmüllner 5'; Arase 55'; Fountas 76'	Barać 51' (o.g.); Anselm 72'	2nd	33	+27	
29	9 May 2021 17:00	Wolfsberger AC	H	1–2	–	Ritzmaier 57'; Barać (red card) 77'	Liendl 68' (pen.); Dieng 90+1'	2nd	33	+26	
30	12 May 2021 20:30	Red Bull Salzburg	A	0–2	–	Hofmann (yellow card) (red card) 86'	Daka 33' 56'	2nd	33	+24	
31	16 May 2021 17:00	Sturm Graz	A	1–4	–	Kara 20'	Kiteishvili 60'; Yeboah 72'; Kuen 79'; Ljubic 90+2'	2nd	33	+21	
32	22 May 2021 17:00	LASK	H	3–0	3,000	Fountas 47'; Knasmüllner 73' 90+5'		2nd	36	+24	

== Austrian Cup ==
=== Austrian Cup fixtures and results ===
Win Loss Postponed

Round	Date	Opponent	Venue	Result F–A	Attendance	Goalscorers and disciplined players		Ref.
Round	Date	Opponent	Venue	Result F–A	Attendance	Rapid Wien	Opponent	Ref.
1st	30 August 2020 17:30	TSV St. Johann im Pongau	H	5–0	1,250	Fountas 12' (penalty missed) 48' 50'; Kara 22'; Demir 89'		
2nd	17 October 2020 17:00	SC Wiener Neustadt	A	5–1	1,250	Knasmüllner 17'; Ritzmaier 32' 70'; Kara 45+1'; Arase 77'	Weidinger 22'	
3rd	16 December 2020 20:30	RB Salzburg	A	2–6	–	Fountas 45+1' (pen.); Ullmann 78'; Hofmann (yellow card) (red card) 82'	Szoboszlai 16'; Berisha 19'; Koïta 23'; Daka 74'; Camara 83' (pen.); Kristensen 87'	

== Champions League ==
=== Champions League review ===
Rapid entered the Champions League in the 2nd qualifying round.

=== Qualifying rounds ===
Round	Date	Opponent	Venue	Result F–A	Attendance	Goalscorers and disciplined players		Ref.
Round	Date	Opponent	Venue	Result F–A	Attendance	Rapid Wien	Opponent	Ref.
Second qualifying round	26 August 2020	Lokomotiva (Croatia)	A	1–0	–	Kara 32'		
Third qualifying round	15 September 2020	Gent (Belgium)	A	1–2	–	Demir 90+2'	Dorsch 36'; Yaremchuk 59' (pen.)	

== Europa League ==
=== Europa League review ===
Rapid entered the Europa League group stage after being eliminated in the 3rd qualifying round of the Champions League.

=== Group stage ===
==== Table ====
Pos	Team	Pld	W	D	L	GF	GA	GD	Pts	Qualification	ARS	MOL	RW	DUN
1	(England) Arsenal	6	6	0	0	20	5	+15	18	Advance to knockout phase	—	4–1	4–1	3–0
2	(Norway) Molde	6	3	1	2	9	11	−2	10	Advance to knockout phase	0–3	—	1–0	3–1
3	(Austria) Rapid Wien	6	2	1	3	11	13	−2	7		1–2	2–2	—	4–3
4	(Republic of Ireland) Dundalk	6	0	0	6	8	19	−11	0		2–4	1–2	1–3	—

Source: UEFA
Rules for classification: Group stage tiebreakers

==== Fixtures and results ====
MD	Date	Opponent	Venue	Result F–A	Attendance	Goalscorers and disciplined players		Table		Ref.
MD	Date	Opponent	Venue	Result F–A	Attendance	Rapid Wien	Opponent	Pos.	Pts.	Ref.
1	22 October 2020 18:55	Arsenal (England)	H	1–2	3,000	Fountas 51'	Luiz 70'; Aubameyang 74'	4th	0	
2	29 October 2020 21:00	Molde (Norway)	A	0–1	600		Omoijuanfo 65'	3rd	0	
3	5 November 2020 18:55	Dundalk (Republic of Ireland)	H	4–3	–	Ljubicic 22'; Arase 79'; Hofmann 87'; Demir 90+1'	Hoban 7'; McMillan 82' (pen.) 90+6' (pen.)	3rd	3	
4	26 November 2020 21:00	Dundalk (Republic of Ireland)	A	3–1	–	Knasmüllner 11'; Kara 37' 58'	Oduwa (penalty missed); Shields 63' (pen.)	3rd	6	
5	3 December 2020 21:00	Arsenal (England)	A	1–4	2,000	Kitagawa 47'	Lacazette 10'; Marí 18'; Nketiah 44'; Smith Rowe 66'	3rd	6	
6	10 December 2020 18:55	Molde (Norway)	H	2–2	–	Ritzmaier 43'; Ibrahimoglu 90'	Eikrem 12' 46'	3rd	7	

== Pre-season and friendlies ==
Date	Opponent	Venue	Result F–A	Goalscorers and disciplined players		Attendance
Date	Opponent	Venue	Result F–A		Opponent	Attendance
1 August 2020	ASV Draßburg	A	4–1	Kara 39' 41'; Knasmüllner 45'; Kitagawa 87'	Markić 31' (pen.)	200
12 August 2020	SFC Opava	N	5–3	Greiml 55'; Kitagawa 59'; Kara 69', 85'; Knasmüllner 89'	Řezníček 7'; Texl 37'; Mondek 52'	–
15 August 2020	FC Slovan Liberec	H	3–0	Kara 8'; Greiml 19'; Fountas 58'		–
19 August 2020	FC Juniors OÖ	H	7–0			–
4 September 2020	Grazer AK	H	1–0	Murg 30'		–
9 January 2021	SV Lafnitz	H	2–1	Demir 38'; Sulzbacher 45'	Gremsl 19'	–
15 January 2021	Admira Wacker	H	3–1	Fountas (red card) 15' (Note: Fountas was sent off for spitting at an opponent and suspended for four competitive games); Kara 30'; Hofmann 39'; Ljubicic 55'	Kerschbaum 27'	–

== Team record ==
Competition	Record							
Competition	M	W	D	L	GF	GA	GD	Win %
Bundesliga	32	17	8	7	64	40	+24	53.13
ÖFB Cup	3	2	0	1	12	7	+5	66.67
Champions League	2	1	0	1	2	2	+0	50.00
Europa League	6	2	1	3	11	13	−2	33.33
Total	43	22	9	12	89	62	+27	51.16

== Squad ==
=== Squad statistics ===
No.	Nat.	Name	Age	League		Austrian Cup		UEFA Competitions		Total		Discipline		
No.	Nat.	Name	Age	Apps	Goals	Apps	Goals	Apps	Goals	Apps	Goals	Yellow card	(yellow card) (red card)	Red card
Goalkeepers
1	(Austria)	Richard Strebinger	27	25		2		4		31		1		
21	(Austria)	Bernhard Unger	21											
25	(Austria)	Paul Gartler	23	7		1		4		12				
Defenders
4	(Croatia)	Mateo Barać	25	25+2		1+1		5+1		31+4		5		1
6	(Austria)	Mario Sonnleitner	33	1+5		1+2		1+1		3+8		2		
17	(Austria)	Christopher Dibon	29											
20	(Austria)	Maximilian Hofmann	26	22		3		7	1	32	1	10	2	1
22	(Montenegro)	Filip Stojković	27	27+2		2		7		36+2		10		1
30	(Austria)	Leo Greiml	18	15+6		2		4		21+6		9		
31	(Austria)	Maximilian Ullmann	24	32	1	3	1	8		43	2	4		
37	(Austria)	Lukas Sulzbacher	20	0+1				0+1		0+2				
Midfielders
8	(Austria)	Marcel Ritzmaier	27	18+6	2	2	2	4	1	24+6	5	2		
10	(Austria)	Thomas Murg	25	4	2	1		2		7	2	1		
13	(Austria)	Thorsten Schick	30	24+5	3	2+1		4+3		30+9	3	4		
14	(Bosnia and Herzegovina)	Srđan Grahovac	27	11+15	1	1+1		4+3		16+19	1	4		
16	(Slovenia)	Dejan Petrovič	22	24		2+1		3		29+1		6		
18	(Hungary)	Tamás Szántó	24											
28	(Austria)	Christoph Knasmüllner	28	16+11	12	2+1	1	3+3	1	21+15	14	2		
36	(Austria)	Kelvin Arase	21	13+11	4	1+1	1	6+2	1	20+14	6	2		
39	(Austria)	Dejan Ljubicic	22	23+1		2		5	1	30+1	1	2		
40	(Austria)	Melih Ibrahimoglu	19	1+1		0+1		1+2	1	2+4	1	1		
42	(Austria)	Lion Schuster	19	5+5	1	0+1		1+1		6+7	1	2		
43	(Serbia)	Dragoljub Savić	19	0+1						0+1				
48	(Austria)	Yusuf Demir	17	6+19	6	0+2	1	1+4	2	7+25	9	1		
Forwards
7	(Austria)	Philipp Schobesberger	26											
9	(Greece)	Taxiarchis Fountas	24	20+4	9	2	4	4+1	1	26+5	14	6		
19	(Austria)	Deni Alar	30	0+4	1			1		1+4	1			
29	(Austria)	Ercan Kara	24	28+4	15	3	2	7+1	3	38+5	20	5		
32	(Japan)	Koya Kitagawa	23	5+13	3	0+3		2+5	1	7+21	4	1		

=== Goal scorers ===
Name	Bundesliga	Cup	International	Total
(Austria) Ercan Kara	15	2	3	20
(Greece) Taxiarchis Fountas	9	4	1	14
(Austria) Christoph Knasmüllner	12	1	1	14
(Austria) Yusuf Demir	6	1	2	9
(Austria) Kelvin Arase	4	1	1	6
(Austria) Marcel Ritzmaier	2	2	1	5
(Japan) Koya Kitagawa	3		1	4
(Austria) Thorsten Schick	3			3
(Austria) Thomas Murg	2			2
(Austria) Maximilian Ullmann	1	1		2
(Austria) Deni Alar	1			1
(Bosnia and Herzegovina) Srđan Grahovac	1			1
(Austria) Maximilian Hofmann			1	1
(Austria) Melih Ibrahimoglu			1	1
(Austria) Dejan Ljubicic			1	1
(Austria) Lion Schuster	1			1
Own goals
(Austria) Jonathan Scherzer (Wolfsberger AC)	2			
(Austria) Raffael Behounek (WSG Swarovski Tirol)	1			
(Austria) Constantin Reiner (SV Ried)	1			
Totals	64	12	13	89

=== Disciplinary record ===
Name	Bundesliga			Cup			International			Total		
Name	Yellow card	(yellow card) (red card)	Red card	Yellow card	(yellow card) (red card)	Red card	Yellow card	(yellow card) (red card)	Red card	Yellow card	(yellow card) (red card)	Red card
(Austria) Maximilian Hofmann	7	1	1		1		3			10	2	1
(Montenegro) Filip Stojković	7		1				3			10		1
(Austria) Leo Greiml	7						2			9		
(Croatia) Mateo Barać	4		1				1			5		1
(Greece) Taxiarchis Fountas	4						2			6		
(Slovenia) Dejan Petrovič	6									6		
(Austria) Ercan Kara	3			1			1			5		
(Bosnia and Herzegovina) Srđan Grahovac	2						2			4		
(Austria) Thorsten Schick	3						1			4		
(Austria) Maximilian Ullmann	3						1			4		
(Austria) Kelvin Arase	1						1			2		
(Austria) Christoph Knasmüllner	1			1						2		
(Austria) Dejan Ljubicic	1						1			2		
(Austria) Marcel Ritzmaier	1						1			2		
(Austria) Lion Schuster	2									2		
(Austria) Mario Sonnleitner							2			2		
(Austria) Yusuf Demir							1			1		
(Austria) Melih Ibrahimoglu	1									1		
(Japan) Koya Kitagawa	1									1		
(Austria) Thomas Murg	1									1		
(Austria) Richard Strebinger	1									1		
Totals	56	1	3	2	1		22			80	2	3

=== Transfers ===
==== In ====
Pos.	Nat.	Name	Age	Moved from	Type	Transfer Window	Ref.
FW	(Austria)	Deni Alar	30	(Bulgaria) PFC Levski Sofia	Loan return	Summer	
FW	(Serbia)	Andrija Pavlović	26	(Cyprus) APOEL FC	Loan return	Summer	
GK	(Austria)	Bernhard Unger	21	(Austria) SV Mattersburg	Free transfer	Summer	
MF	(Austria)	Marcel Ritzmaier	27	(England) Barnsley F.C.	Loan	Summer	

==== Out ====
Pos.	Nat.	Name	Age	Moved to	Type	Transfer Window	Ref.
DF	(Austria)	Stephan Auer	29	(Austria) Admira Wacker	Free agent	Summer	
MF	(Austria)	Stefan Schwab	29	(Greece) PAOK FC	Free agent	Summer	
GK	(Austria)	Tobias Knoflach	26	unknown	Free agent	Summer	
FW	(Serbia)	Andrija Pavlović	26	(Denmark) Brøndby IF	Transfer	Summer	
MF	(Austria)	Thomas Murg	25	(Greece) PAOK FC	Transfer	Summer	
MF	(Austria)	Melih Ibrahimoglu	20	(Netherlands) Heracles Almelo	Transfer	Winter	
