= Kelvin Arase =

Austrian footballer (born 1999)

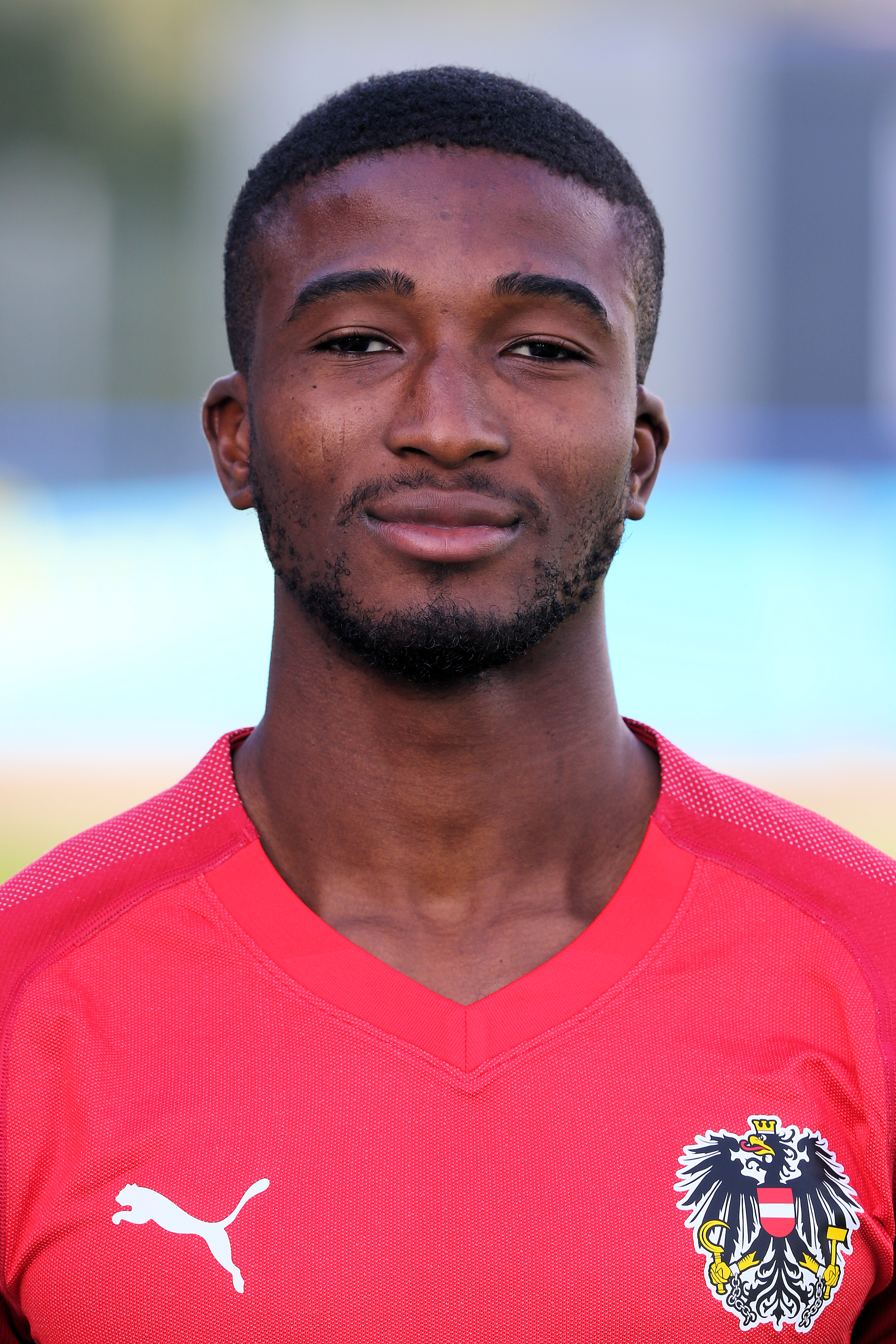
- Arase with Austria U19 in 2019

Personal information
- Date of birth: 15 January 1999 (age 27)
- Place of birth: Benin City, Nigeria
- Height: 1.72 m (5 ft 8 in)
- Position: Winger

Team information
- Current team: Phoenix Rising
- Number: 28

Youth career
- 2009–2011: SR Donaufeld Wien
- 2011–2017: Rapid Wien

Senior career*
Years	Team	Apps	(Gls)
2016–2022	Rapid Wien	75	(10)
2018–2019	→ Horn (loan)	19	(1)
2019	→ Ried (loan)	2	(0)
2022–2023	Karlsruher SC	7	(0)
2023	→ Oostende (loan)	10	(1)
2023–2025	Waldhof Mannheim	59	(4)
2025–	Phoenix Rising	13	(3)

International career^{‡}
2014	Austria U15	1	(0)
2015–2016	Austria U17	10	(0)
2016–2017	Austria U18	2	(0)
2016–2018	Austria U19	14	(5)
2019	Austria U20	1	(0)
2018–2020	Austria U21	4	(0)
- * Club domestic league appearances and goals as of 20:11, 10 November 2026 (UTC) ‡ National team caps and goals as of 14 December 2016

Kelvin Arase (born 15 January 1999) is an Austrian professional footballer who plays as a winger for Phoenix Rising in the USL Championship.

Arase has played over 100 times for Rapid Wien, and has over 30 youth caps for Austria.

== Club career ==
=== Early career ===
Born in Benin City in 1999, Arase moved to Vienna's Donaustadt district at the age of six. He started his football career with SR Donaufeld Wien's youth team in 2009. In 2011, Arase moved to Rapid Wien's youth team.

=== Rapid Wien ===
On 19 September 2016, he made his Austrian Bundesliga debut against SV Mattersburg at Allianz Stadion, replacing Louis Schaub at the 86th minute by coach Mike Büskens. On 25 November 2017, Arase signed a new two and a half year contract with the club until summer 2020. He scored his first goal for the club in the Austrian Cup against SV Allerheiligen on 21 July 2019, scoring in the 90th+2nd minute.

On 27 August 2018, Arase was loaned out to SV Horn as a co-operation player, re-joining his former Rapid coach Carsten Jancker.

After making 7 competitive appearances, on 13 August 2019, Arase was loaned out to SV Ried, again as a co-operation player, which means that Rapid Wien can recall him at any time. However, he was recalled after only two weeks due to injuries in the Rapid Wien squad.

=== Karlsruher SC ===
On 24 March 2022, Arase was announced at Karlsruher SC on a three-year contract.

On 20 January 2023, Arase was loaned to Oostende in Belgium until the end of the 2022–23 season.

=== Waldhof Mannheim ===
On 11 August 2023, Arase joined Waldhof Mannheim in 3. Liga.

=== Phoenix Rising ===
On 23 August 2025, Arase moved to USL Championship side Phoenix Rising.

== International career ==
Arase was part of the Austria U17 team that took part in the 2016 UEFA European Under-17 Championship.

== Career statistics ==
=== Club ===
As of 4 July 2022

Appearances and goals by club, season and competition
Club	Season	League			Cup		Continental		Other		Total	
Club	Season	Division	Apps	Goals	Apps	Goals	Apps	Goals	Apps	Goals	Apps	Goals
Rapid Wien	2016–17	Austrian Bundesliga	2	0	1	0	—		—		3	0
Rapid Wien	2017–18	Austrian Bundesliga	1	0	1	0	—		—		2	0
Rapid Wien	2018–19	Austrian Bundesliga	0	0	0	0	0	0	1 (Note: Appearances in Austrian Bundesliga play-offs)	0	1	0
Rapid Wien	2019–20	Austrian Bundesliga	25	5	2	1	—		—		27	6
Rapid Wien	2020–21	Austrian Bundesliga	24	4	2	1	8	1	—		34	6
Rapid Wien	2021–22	Austrian Bundesliga	23	1	3	0	12	0	—		38	1
Rapid Wien	Total		75	10	9	2	20	1	1	0	105	13
Horn (loan)	2018–19	Austrian 2. Liga	19	1	1	0	—		—		20	1
Ried (loan)	2019–20	Austrian 2. Liga	2	0	—		—		—		2	0
Career total			96	11	10	2	20	1	1	0	127	14
