= Thorsten Schick =

Austrian footballer (born 1990)

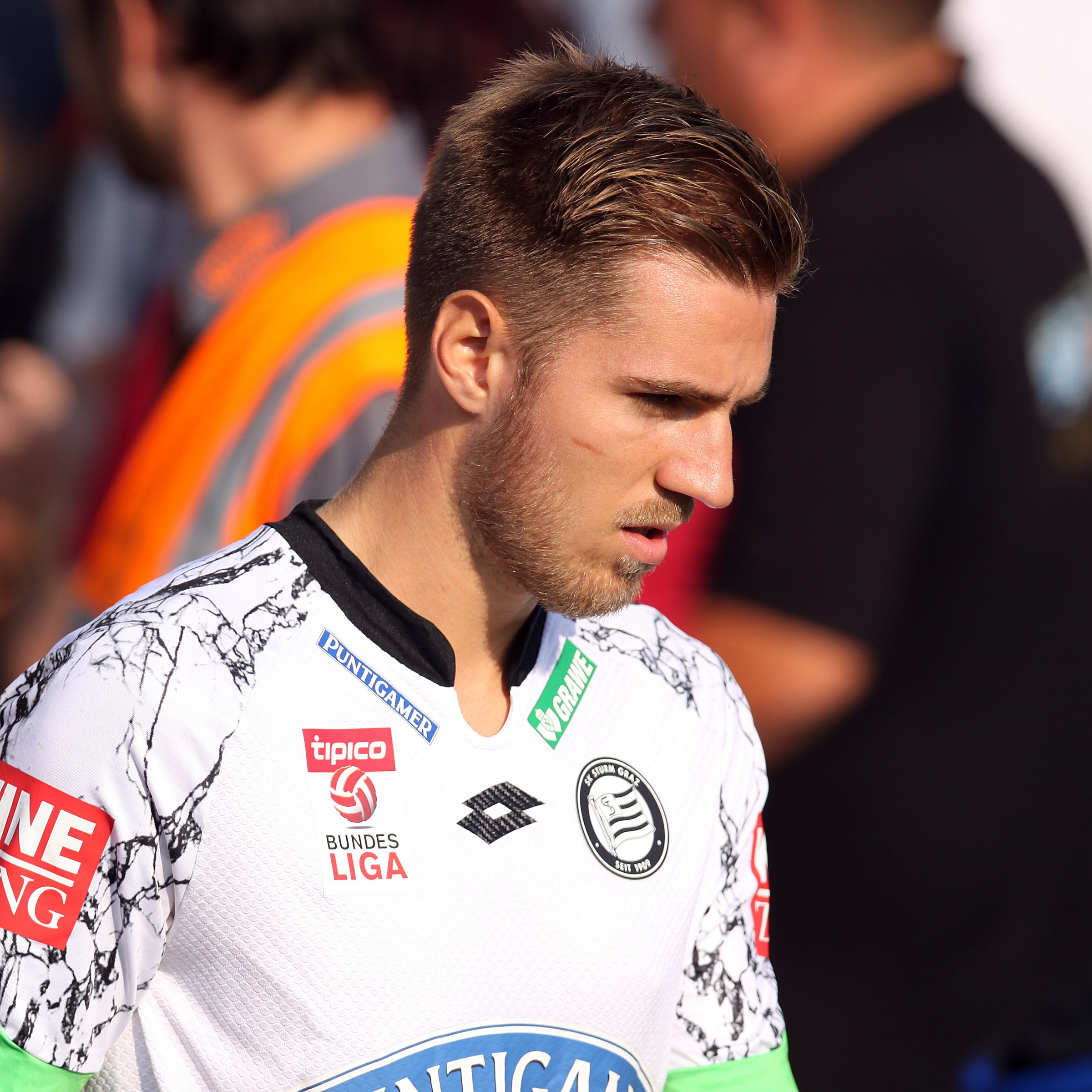

Personal information
- Date of birth: 19 May 1990 (age 36)
- Place of birth: Graz, Austria
- Height: 1.80 m (5 ft 11 in)
- Position: Right midfielder

Team information
- Current team: DSV Leoben
- Number: 17

Senior career*
Years	Team	Apps	(Gls)
2007–2009	Sturm Graz	0	(0)
2009–2010	Gratkorn	35	(0)
2010–2012	Altach	33	(4)
2012–2014	Admira Wacker	59	(11)
2014–2016	Sturm Graz	58	(6)
2016–2019	Young Boys	79	(7)
2019–2024	Rapid Wien	115	(3)
2024–	DSV Leoben	13	(1)

International career
2009	Austria U20	3	(0)
- * Club domestic league appearances and goals as of 28 December 2024

Thorsten Schick (born 19 May 1990) is an Austrian footballer who plays as a right midfielder for Austrian Regionalliga Central club DSV Leoben.

== Career ==
He was part of the Young Boys squad that won the 2017–18 Swiss Super League, their first league title in 32 years.

On 21 June 2024, Schick signed with recently relegated Austrian Regionalliga Central club DSV Leoben after his contract with Rapid Wien was not renewed following five seasons at the club.

== Career statistics ==
As of match played 21 September 2024

Appearances and goals by club, season and competition
Club	Season	League			Cup		Continental		Other		Total	
Club	Season	Division	Apps	Goals	Apps	Goals	Apps	Goals	Apps	Goals	Apps	Goals
Gratkorn	2009–10	2. Liga	17	0	1	0	—		—		18	0
Gratkorn	2010–11	2. Liga	18	0	1	0	—		—		19	0
Gratkorn	Total		35	0	2	0	—		—		37	0
Altach	2010–11	2. Liga	4	0	—		—		—		4	0
Altach	2011–12	2. Liga	29	4	1	0	—		—		30	4
Altach	Total		33	4	1	0	—		—		34	4
Admira Wacker	2012–13	Austrian Bundesliga	23	5	2	0	3	0	—		28	5
Admira Wacker	2013–14	Austrian Bundesliga	31	5	3	1	—		—		34	6
Admira Wacker	2014–15	Austrian Bundesliga	5	1	1	1	—		—		6	2
Admira Wacker	Total		59	11	6	2	3	0	—		68	13
Sturm Graz	2014–15	Austrian Bundesliga	28	4	2	1	—		—		30	5
Sturm Graz	2015–16	Austrian Bundesliga	30	2	4	2	2	0	—		36	4
Sturm Graz	Total		58	6	6	3	2	0	—		66	9
Young Boys	2016–17	Swiss Super League	30	4	3	0	8	1	—		41	5
Young Boys	2017–18	Swiss Super League	23	2	5	1	5	0	—		33	3
Young Boys	2018–19	Swiss Super League	26	1	4	0	2	0	—		32	1
Young Boys	Total		79	7	12	1	15	1	—		106	9
Rapid Wien	2019–20	Austrian Bundesliga	17	0	1	0	—		—		18	0
Rapid Wien	2020–21	Austrian Bundesliga	29	3	2	0	7	0	—		38	3
Rapid Wien	2021–22	Austrian Bundesliga	29	0	4	0	11	0	—		44	0
Rapid Wien	2022–23	Austrian Bundesliga	25	0	5	0	6	0	—		36	0
Rapid Wien	2023–24	Austrian Bundesliga	15	0	3	0	3	0	—		21	0
Rapid Wien	Total		115	3	15	0	27	0	—		157	3
DSV Leoben	2024–25	Regionalliga Central	7	1	1	0	—		—		8	1
Career total			386	32	43	6	47	1	0	0	476	39

== Honours ==
Young Boys

- Swiss Super League: 2017–18
