= Maximilian Hofmann =

Austrian footballer

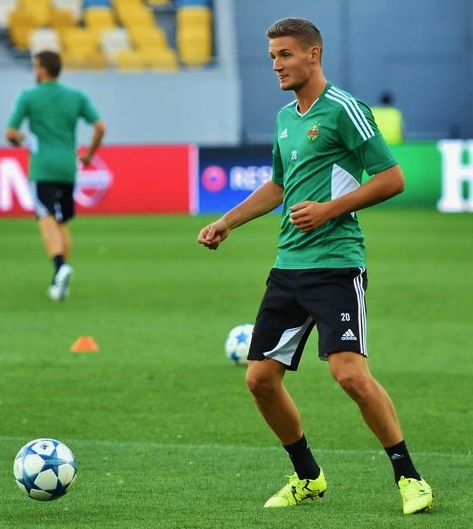

Personal information
- Date of birth: 7 August 1993 (age 33)
- Place of birth: Vienna, Austria
- Height: 1.83 m (6 ft 0 in)
- Position: Centre back

Team information
- Current team: Debreceni VSC
- Number: 28

Youth career
- 2000–2003: SV Wienerberg
- 2003–2011: Rapid Wien

Senior career*
| Years | Team | Apps | (Gls) |
| 2011–2014 | Rapid Wien II | 47 | (3) |
| 2013–2025 | Rapid Wien | 192 | (3) |
| 2025– | Debrecen | 23 | (1) |

International career^{‡}
| 2014 | Austria under-21 | 2 | (0) |
- * Club domestic league appearances and goals as of 30 May 2026 ‡ National team caps and goals as of 28 August 2015

Maximilian Hofmann (born 7 August 1993) is an Austrian footballer who plays as a defender for Hungarian Nemzeti Bajnokság I club Debreceni VSC.

== Career ==
Hofmann began his youth career with local side SV Wienerberg before joining Rapid Wien in 2003. He advanced through the club's youth system and made his debut for the second team in a 5–0 win against SC Ritzing in Regional League East on 7 October 2011. He made his first-team debut as a late substitute in a 3–0 win against SV Ried on 26 May 2013.

Hofmann's first league start, and third competitive appearance, for Rapid Wien saw him give away a penalty and receive a red card within the first 90 seconds of a game that would conclude in a 4–2 win against SK Sturm Graz on 4 August 2013.

=== Debrecen ===
On 10 January 2025, Hofmann moved from Austrian club Rapid Wien to Hungarian club Debrecen.

== Career statistics ==
As of match played 30 October 2024

Appearances and goals by club, season and competition
| Club | Season | League | | | Cup | | Continental | | Other | | Total | |
| Club | Season | Division | Apps | Goals | Apps | Goals | Apps | Goals | Apps | Goals | Apps | Goals |
|---|---|---|---|---|---|---|---|---|---|---|---|---|
| Rapid Wien II | 2011–12 | Austrian Regionalliga East | 19 | 0 | — | | — | | — | | 19 | 0 |
| Rapid Wien II | 2012–13 | Austrian Regionalliga East | 15 | 0 | — | | — | | — | | 15 | 0 |
| Rapid Wien II | 2013–14 | Austrian Regionalliga East | 11 | 3 | — | | — | | — | | 11 | 3 |
| Rapid Wien II | 2014–15 | Austrian Regionalliga East | 2 | 0 | — | | — | | — | | 2 | 0 |
| Rapid Wien II | Total | | 47 | 3 | — | | — | | — | | 47 | 3 |
| Rapid Wien | 2012–13 | Austrian Bundesliga | 1 | 0 | — | | — | | — | | 1 | 0 |
| Rapid Wien | 2013–14 | Austrian Bundesliga | 5 | 0 | 0 | 0 | 1 | 0 | — | | 6 | 0 |
| Rapid Wien | 2014–15 | Austrian Bundesliga | 23 | 1 | 3 | 0 | 2 | 0 | — | | 28 | 1 |
| Rapid Wien | 2015–16 | Austrian Bundesliga | 22 | 0 | 3 | 0 | 8 | 1 | — | | 33 | 1 |
| Rapid Wien | 2016–17 | Austrian Bundesliga | 19 | 0 | 3 | 0 | 4 | 0 | — | | 26 | 0 |
| Rapid Wien | 2017–18 | Austrian Bundesliga | 23 | 0 | 4 | 0 | — | | — | | 27 | 0 |
| Rapid Wien | 2018–19 | Austrian Bundesliga | 15 | 1 | 4 | 2 | 5 | 0 | — | | 24 | 3 |
| Rapid Wien | 2019–20 | Austrian Bundesliga | 18 | 1 | 2 | 1 | — | | — | | 20 | 2 |
| Rapid Wien | 2020–21 | Austrian Bundesliga | 22 | 0 | 3 | 0 | 7 | 1 | — | | 32 | 1 |
| Rapid Wien | 2021–22 | Austrian Bundesliga | 13 | 0 | 3 | 1 | 1 | 0 | 1 | 0 | 18 | 1 |
| Rapid Wien | 2022–23 | Austrian Bundesliga | 6 | 0 | 1 | 0 | 4 | 0 | — | | 11 | 0 |
| Rapid Wien | 2023–24 | Austrian Bundesliga | 17 | 0 | 3 | 0 | 3 | 0 | — | | 23 | 0 |
| Rapid Wien | 2024–25 | Austrian Bundesliga | 8 | 0 | 3 | 1 | 5 | 0 | — | | 16 | 1 |
| Rapid Wien | Total | | 192 | 3 | 32 | 5 | 40 | 2 | 1 | 0 | 265 | 10 |
| Debreceni VSC | 2024–25 | Nemzeti Bajnokság I | 0 | 0 | — | | — | | — | | 0 | 0 |
| Debreceni VSC | Total | | 0 | 0 | 0 | 0 | 0 | 0 | 0 | 0 | 0 | 0 |
| Career total | | | 239 | 3 | 32 | 5 | 40 | 2 | 1 | 0 | 312 | 10 |
