= Bernhard Zimmermann =

Austrian football player

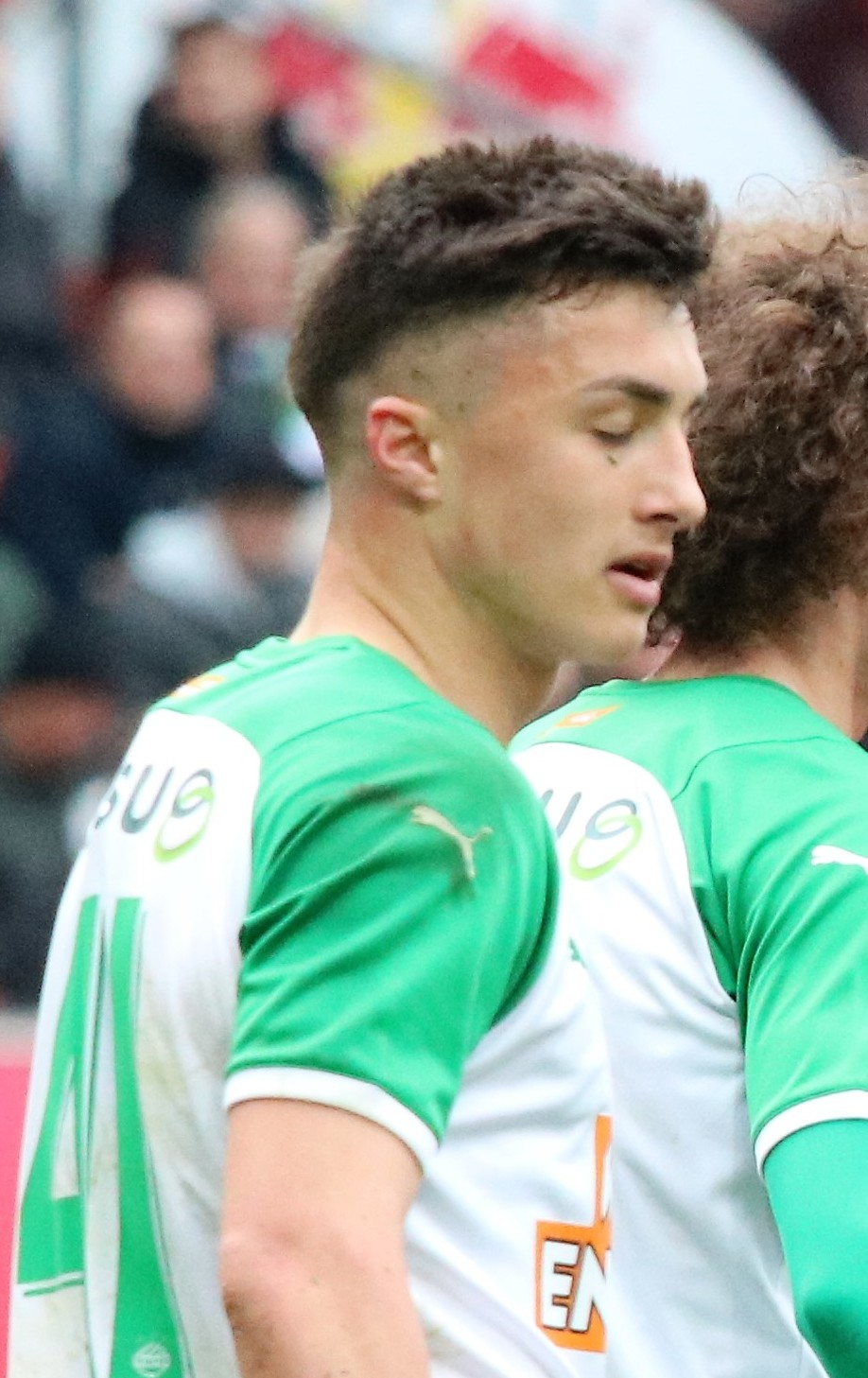
- Zimmermann in 2022

Personal information
- Date of birth: 15 February 2002 (age 24)
- Place of birth: Korneuburg, Austria
- Height: 1.80 m (5 ft 11 in)
- Position: Forward

Team information
- Current team: First Vienna
- Number: 18

Youth career
- 2007–2014: SC Korneuburg
- 2014–2020: SKN St. Pölten

Senior career*
| Years | Team | Apps | (Gls) |
| 2020–2022 | Rapid Wien II | 45 | (6) |
| 2022–2025 | Rapid Wien | 36 | (12) |
| 2023–2024 | → Wolfsberger AC (loan) | 27 | (3) |
| 2025– | First Vienna | 43 | (14) |

International career^{‡}
| 2017 | Austria U15 | 6 | (1) |
| 2017–2018 | Austria U16 | 5 | (3) |
| 2018–2019 | Austria U17 | 11 | (2) |
| 2019–2020 | Austria U18 | 6 | (1) |
| 2022– | Austria U21 | 19 | (1) |
- * Club domestic league appearances and goals as of 17 May 2026 ‡ National team caps and goals as of 26 March 2024

Bernhard Zimmermann (born 15 February 2002) is an Austrian professional footballer who plays as a forward for First Vienna.

== Professional career ==
Zimmermann gave his professional debut for Rapid Wien on 27 February 2022 against WSG Tirol. A week later, on 6 March 2022 he scored his first professional goals with a brace in a win against Austria Klagenfurt.

On 4 March 2022, Zimmermann extended his contract with Rapid Wien until 2025.

On 16 June 2023, Zimmermann agreed to join Wolfsberger AC on a season-long loan.

On 22 January 2025, Zimmerman signed a two-and-a-half-year contract with First Vienna.

== Career statistics ==
=== Club ===
As of 15 March 2022

Appearances and goals by club, season and competition
| Club | Season | League | | Cup | | Continental | | Total | |
| Club | Season | Apps | Goals | Apps | Goals | Apps | Goals | Apps | Goals |
|---|---|---|---|---|---|---|---|---|---|
| Rapid Wien | 2021–22 | 13 | 5 | 0 | 0 | 0 | 0 | 13 | 5 |
| Total | | 13 | 5 | 0 | 0 | 0 | 0 | 13 | 5 |
