= Richard Strebinger =

Austrian footballer

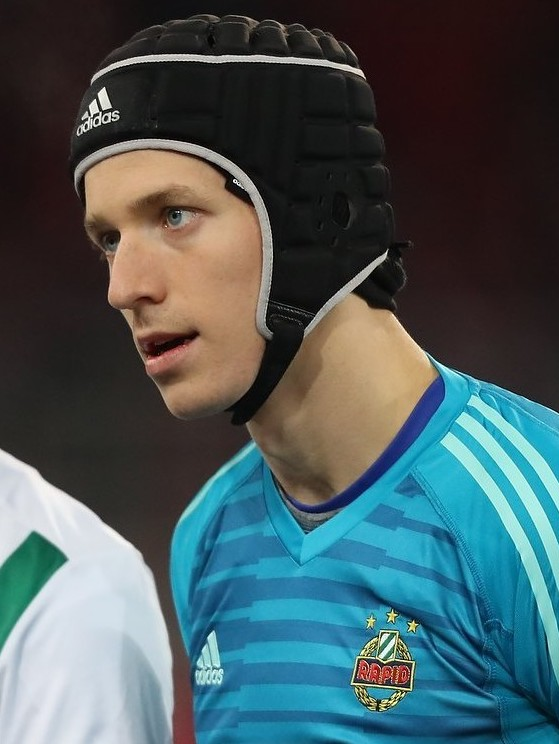
- Strebinger with Rapid Wien in 2018

Personal information
- Date of birth: 14 February 1993 (age 33)
- Place of birth: Wiener Neustadt, Lower Austria, Austria
- Height: 1.94 m (6 ft 4 in)
- Position: Goalkeeper

Team information
- Current team: Kapfenberger SV
- Number: 1

Youth career
- 2002–2003: SC Piesting
- 2003–2007: FV Club 83 Wiener Neustadt
- 2007–2008: AKA St. Pölten
- 2008–2010: Hertha BSC

Senior career*
Years	Team	Apps	(Gls)
2010–2012	Hertha BSC II	26	(0)
2012–2015	Werder Bremen II	41	(0)
2013–2015	Werder Bremen	2	(0)
2015	→ Jahn Regensburg (loan)	14	(0)
2015–2022	Rapid Wien	158	(0)
2022	Legia Warsaw	5	(0)
2022	Legia Warsaw II	1	(0)
2023	SV Ried	0	(0)
2023–	Kapfenberger SV	66	(0)

International career
- Austria U17
- Austria U18
- Austria U19
2012–2014	Austria U21	6	(0)
2018	Austria	1	(0)
- * Club domestic league appearances and goals as of 17 May 2026

Richard Strebinger (born 14 February 1993) is an Austrian professional footballer who plays as a goalkeeper for Kapfenberger SV.

== Club career ==
Strebinger played for the youth teams of SC Piesting, FV Club 83 Wiener Neustadt, and AKA St. Pölten before moving to Germany and joining Hertha BSC. He played 26 matches for Hertha's second team, but did not make it to the first squad. In summer 2012, he moved to SV Werder Bremen. In Bremen, he also played for the second team but made his professional debut for the first team on 7 December 2014 when their regular goalkeeper Raphael Wolf was injured and Strebinger was substituted in. In order to get match time, he was loaned out in January 2015 to SSV Jahn Regensburg until the end of the season.

On 20 February 2022, he penned a short-term contract with an extension option with reigning champions of Polish Ekstraklasa Legia Warsaw, who, at the time of Strebinger's signing, were second last in the league table. On 11 June 2022, Strebinger left the club.

== International career ==
Strebinger played for the Austria U17, U18 and U19, and U21. He made his debut for the Austria national team on 16 October 2018 in a friendly against Denmark.

== Career statistics ==
=== Club ===
As of match played 24 May 2025

Appearances and goals by club, season and competition
Club	Season	League			National cup (Note: Includes Austrian Cup, Polish Cup)		Continental		Other		Total	
Club	Season	Division	Apps	Goals	Apps	Goals	Apps	Goals	Apps	Goals	Apps	Goals
Hertha BSC II	2010–11	Regionalliga Nord	12	0	—		—		—		12	0
Hertha BSC II	2011–12	Regionalliga Nord	14	0	—		—		—		14	0
Hertha BSC II	Total		26	0	—		—		—		26	0
Hertha BSC	2010–11	2. Bundesliga	0	0	0	0	—		—		0	0
Hertha BSC	2011–12	Bundesliga	0	0	0	0	—		—		0	0
Hertha BSC	Total		0	0	0	0	—		—		0	0
Werder Bremen II	2012–13	Regionalliga Nord	21	0	—		—		—		21	0
Werder Bremen II	2013–14	Regionalliga Nord	14	0	—		—		—		14	0
Werder Bremen II	2014–15	Regionalliga Nord	5	0	—		—		—		5	0
Werder Bremen II	Total		40	0	—		—		—		40	0
Werder Bremen	2012–13	Bundesliga	0	0	0	0	—		—		0	0
Werder Bremen	2014–15	Bundesliga	2	0	0	0	—		—		2	0
Werder Bremen	Total		2	0	0	0	—		—		2	0
Jahn Regensburg (loan)	2014–15	3. Liga	14	0	—		—		—		14	0
Rapid Wien	2015–16	Austrian Bundesliga	23	0	4	0	4 (Note: Appearances in UEFA Europa League)	0	—		31	0
Rapid Wien	2016–17	Austrian Bundesliga	17	0	1	0	4	0	—		22	0
Rapid Wien	2017–18	Austrian Bundesliga	35	0	3	0	—		—		38	0
Rapid Wien	2018–19	Austrian Bundesliga	32	0	5	0	12	0	—		49	0
Rapid Wien	2019–20	Austrian Bundesliga	20	0	2	0	—		—		22	0
Rapid Wien	2020–21	Austrian Bundesliga	25	0	2	0	4 (Note: Two appearances in UEFA Champions League, two appearances in UEFA Europa League)	0	—		31	0
Rapid Wien	2021–22	Austrian Bundesliga	6	0	1	0	5 (Note: Two appearances in UEFA Champions League, three appearances in UEFA Europa League)	0	—		12	0
Rapid Wien	Total		158	0	18	0	29	0	0	0	205	0
Legia Warsaw	2021–22	Ekstraklasa	5	0	1	0	—		—		6	0
SV Ried	2022–23	Austrian Bundesliga	0	0	0	0	—		—		0	0
Kapfenberger SV	2023–24	2. Liga	25	0	3	0	—		—		28	0
Kapfenberger SV	2024–25	2. Liga	28	0	2	0	—		—		30	0
Kapfenberger SV	Total		53	0	5	0	—		—		58	0
Career total			298	0	24	0	29	0	0	0	351	0
