= Lion Schuster =

Austrian footballer

Personal information
- Date of birth: 9 August 2000 (age 26)
- Place of birth: Vienna, Austria
- Height: 1.83 m (6 ft 0 in)
- Position: Midfielder

Team information
- Current team: Mühlhausen
- Number: 42

Youth career
- 2006–2010: Altenmarkt
- 2010–2012: Badener
- 2012–2018: Rapid Wien

Senior career*
Years	Team	Apps	(Gls)
2018–2023	Rapid Wien II	62	(5)
2019–2023	Rapid Wien	15	(1)
2023–2025	SV Sandhausen	16	(1)
2025	Holstein Kiel II	14	(0)
2026–	Mühlhausen	2	(0)

International career^{‡}
2016	Austria U16	5	(0)
2016–2017	Austria U17	11	(0)
2017	Austria U18	6	(0)
2018	Austria U19	6	(0)
- * Club domestic league appearances and goals as of 19 March 2026 ‡ National team caps and goals as of 3 December 2020

Lion Schuster (born 9 August 2000) is an Austrian professional footballer who plays as a midfielder for Verbandsliga Nordbaden team Mühlhausen.

== Club career ==
A youth product of Rapid Wien since 2012, Schuster signed a professional contract with the team on 14 August 2020. Schuster made his professional debut with Rapid Wien in a 2–1 Austrian Cup loss to FC Red Bull Salzburg on 25 September 2019.

On 3 August 2023, Schuster signed with German club SV Sandhausen, playing in 3. Liga.

== Career statistics ==
As of 17 June 2022

Appearances and goals by club, season and competition
Club	Season	League			Cup		Continental		Other		Total	
Club	Season	Division	Apps	Goals	Apps	Goals	Apps	Goals	Apps	Goals	Apps	Goals
Rapid Wien	2019–20	Austrian Bundesliga	1	0	1	0	—		—		2	0
Rapid Wien	2020–21	Austrian Bundesliga	9	1	0	0	2	0	—		11	1
Rapid Wien	2021–22	Austrian Bundesliga	4	0	0	0	5	0	—		9	0
Rapid Wien	Total		14	1	1	0	7	0	0	0	22	1
Career total			14	1	1	0	7	0	0	0	22	1
