= Leo Greiml =

Austrian footballer (born 2001)

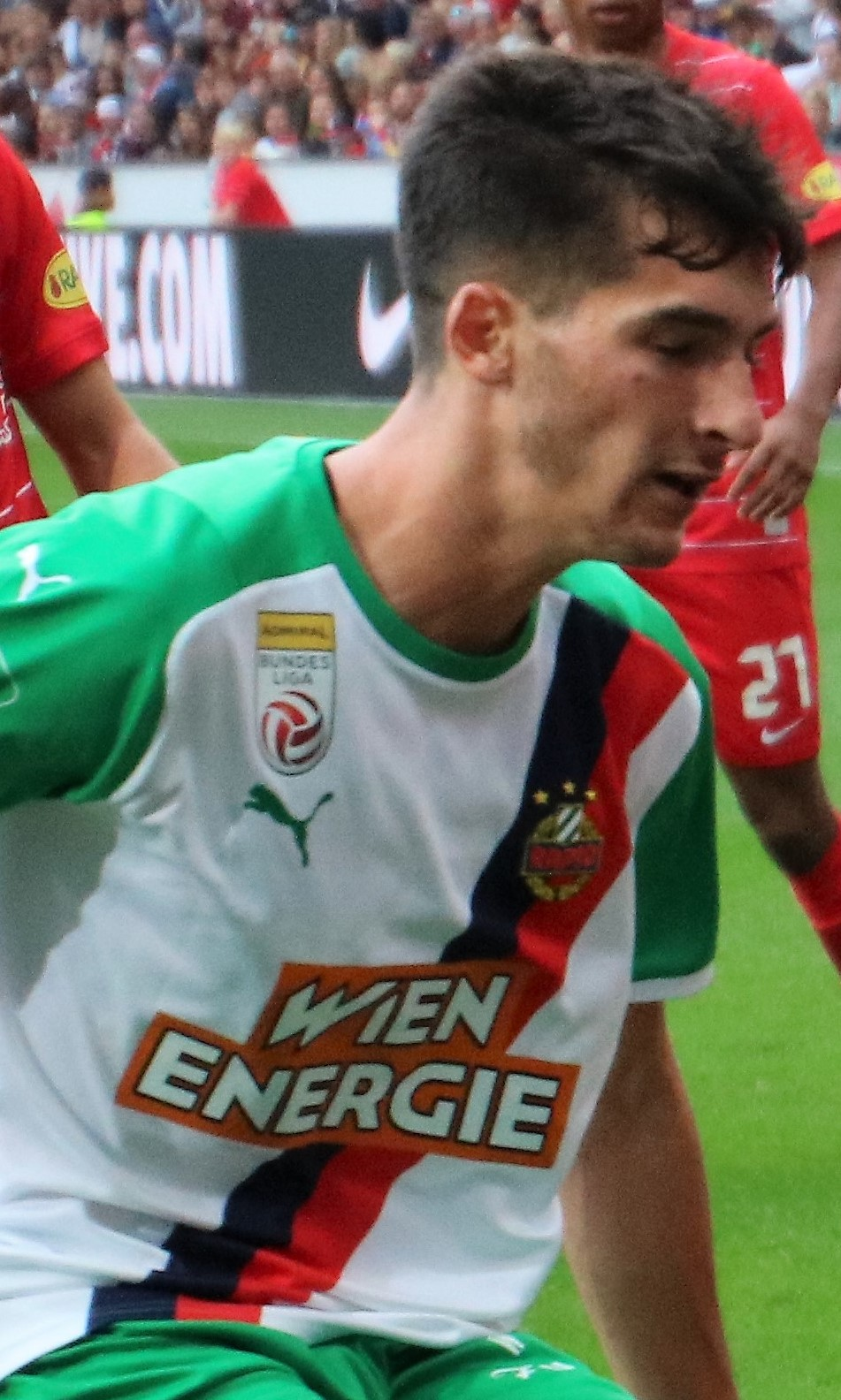
- Greiml with Rapid Wien in 2021

Personal information
- Date of birth: 3 July 2001 (age 25)
- Place of birth: Horn, Austria
- Height: 1.87 m (6 ft 2 in)
- Position: Defender

Team information
- Current team: NAC Breda
- Number: 12

Youth career
- 2006–2014: Horn
- 2014–2018: St. Pölten

Senior career*
Years	Team	Apps	(Gls)
2018–2019	Rapid Wien II	35	(0)
2019–2022	Rapid Wien	42	(0)
2022-2024	Schalke 04	7	(0)
2022–2023	Schalke 04 II	8	(0)
2024–	NAC Breda	43	(3)

International career
2017	Austria U16	7	(0)
2017–2018	Austria U17	8	(0)
2019	Austria U18	2	(0)
2020–2021	Austria U21	7	(1)
- * Club domestic league appearances and goals as of 21 May 2026

Leo Greiml (born 3 July 2001) is an Austrian professional footballer who plays as a defender for Dutch Eerste Divisie club NAC Breda.

== Career ==
=== Rapid Wien ===
On 11 May 2018, Greiml signed with Rapid Wien. He made his professional debut with Rapid Wien in a 2–1 Austrian Bundesliga loss to Sturm Graz on 30 May 2019.

=== Schalke 04 ===
On 13 April 2022, Greiml agreed to join Schalke 04 on a free transfer for the 2022–23 season, signing a three-year contract. He made his first team debut for Schalke in the Bundesliga on 10 September 2022, coming on as a substitute in the 87th minute in a 3–1 home win against VfL Bochum.

=== NAC Breda ===
On 1 August 2024, NAC Breda announced that they had signed Greiml on a two-year contract.

== Career statistics ==
=== Club ===
As of match played 9 August 2024

Appearances and goals by club, season and competition
Club	Season	League			Cup		Europe		Other		Total	
Club	Season	Division	Apps	Goals	Apps	Goals	Apps	Goals	Apps	Goals	Apps	Goals
Rapid Wien II	2018–19	Austrian Regionalliga	21	0	—		—		—		31	8
Rapid Wien II	2019–20	Austrian Regionalliga	14	0	—		—		—		14	0
Rapid Wien II	Total		35	0	—		—		—		35	0
Rapid Wien	2018–19	Austrian Bundesliga	0	0	0	0	—		1 (Note: Appearance in Europa League play-offs.)	0	1	0
Rapid Wien	2019–20	Austrian Bundesliga	9	0	0	0	—		—		9	0
Rapid Wien	2020–21	Austrian Bundesliga	21	0	2	0	4	0	—		27	0
Rapid Wien	2021–22	Austrian Bundesliga	11	0	1	0	8	1	—		20	1
Rapid Wien	Total		41	0	3	0	12	1	1	0	57	1
Schalke 04 II	2022–23	Regionalliga West	8	0	—		—		—		8	0
Schalke 04	2022–23	Bundesliga	7	0	0	0	—		—		7	0
Schalke 04	2023–24	2. Bundesliga	0	0	0	0	—		—		0	0
Schalke 04	Total		7	0	0	0	—		—		7	0
NAC Breda	2024–25	Eredivisie	1	0	0	0	—		—		1	0
Career total			92	0	3	0	12	1	1	0	108	1

== Honours ==
Individual

- Eredivisie Team of the Month: November 2024
