= Marcel Ritzmaier =

Austrian footballer

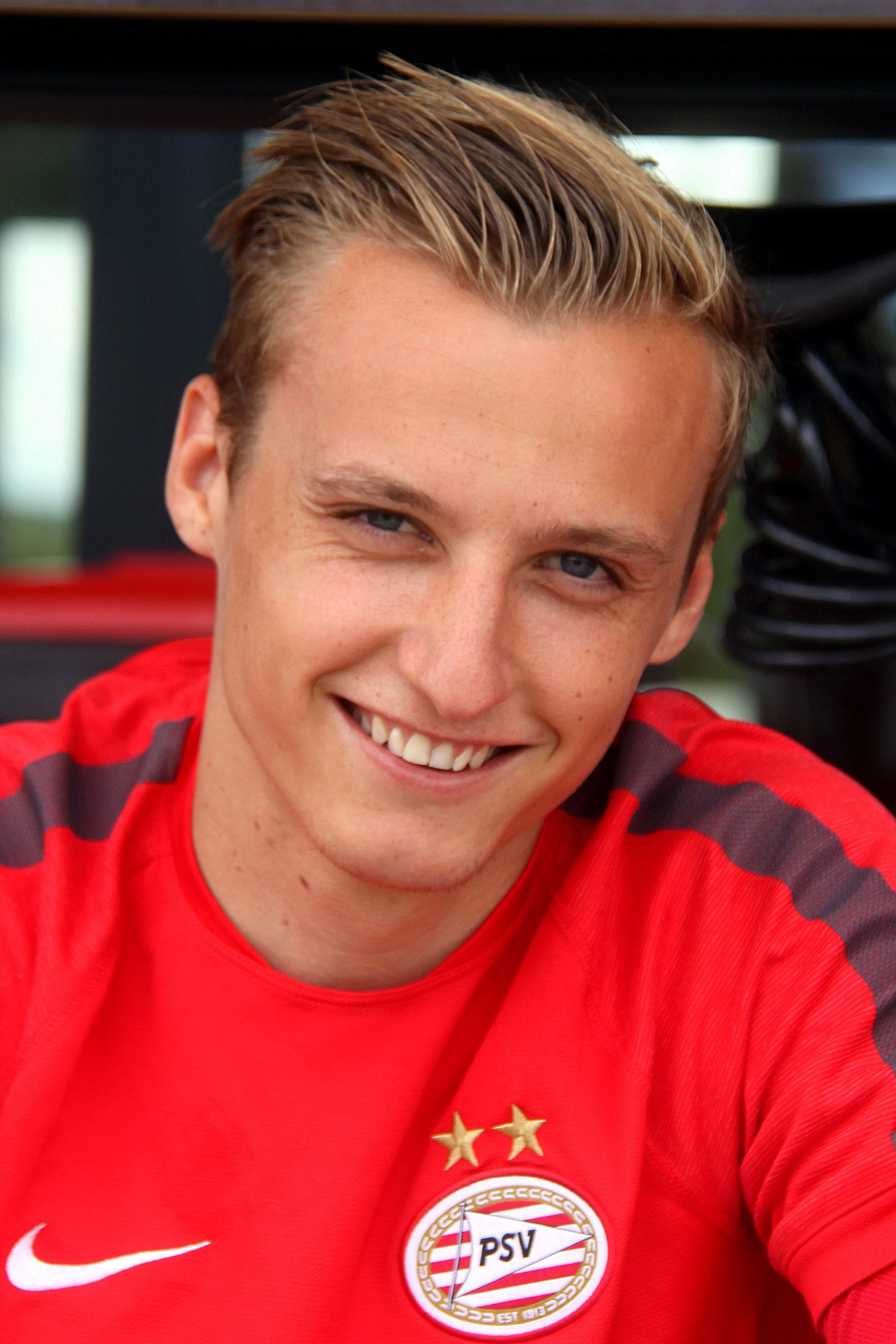
- Ritzmaier with PSV in 2014

Personal information
- Date of birth: 22 April 1993 (age 33)
- Place of birth: Judenburg, Austria
- Height: 1.80 m (5 ft 11 in)
- Position: Midfielder

Team information
- Current team: Rudar Prijedor
- Number: 17

Youth career
- 1997–1999: TuS Spielberg
- 1999–2004: SV Lobmingtal
- 2004–2006: FC Judenburg
- 2006–2008: Austria Kärnten
- 2010–2012: PSV

Senior career*
Years	Team	Apps	(Gls)
2008–2009	Austria Kärnten II	5	(1)
2009–2010	Austria Kärnten	1	(0)
2010–2018	PSV	9	(0)
2013–2018	Jong PSV	42	(16)
2013–2014	→ Cambuur (loan)	31	(3)
2015–2016	→ NEC (loan)	20	(1)
2016–2017	→ Go Ahead Eagles (loan)	28	(2)
2018–2020	Wolfsberger AC	47	(3)
2020–2021	Barnsley	18	(0)
2020–2021	→ Rapid Wien (loan)	24	(2)
2021–2023	SV Sandhausen	34	(1)
2023–2025	SKN St. Pölten	20	(0)
2026–	Rudar Prijedor	16	(2)

International career
2009	Austria U16	2	(0)
2008–2010	Austria U17	9	(2)
2010	Austria U18	1	(0)
2011–2012	Austria U19	9	(2)
2012–2014	Austria U21	11	(3)
- * Club domestic league appearances and goals as of 12 June 2026

Marcel Ritzmaier (born 22 April 1993) is an Austrian professional footballer who plays as a midfielder or left-back for Rudar Prijedor in the Bosnian Premier League.

== Club career ==
=== Early career ===
Born in Judenburg, Styria, Ritzmaier started playing football in December 1997 with the youth side of TuS Spielberg before joining SV Lobmingtal in September 1999. In January 2004, after three and a half years in the SV Lobmingtal youth teams, he moved to FC Judenburg.

Having become one of the key players of FC Judenburg, Ritzmaier was scouted by SK Austria Kärnten in July 2006. He played two and a half years in the Austria Kärnten youth system and was promoted to the reserve team in January 2009. In July 2009, he became part of Austrian Bundesliga team squad and made his debut on 2 August 2009 against Rapid Wien, making his only appearances for the club.

=== PSV ===
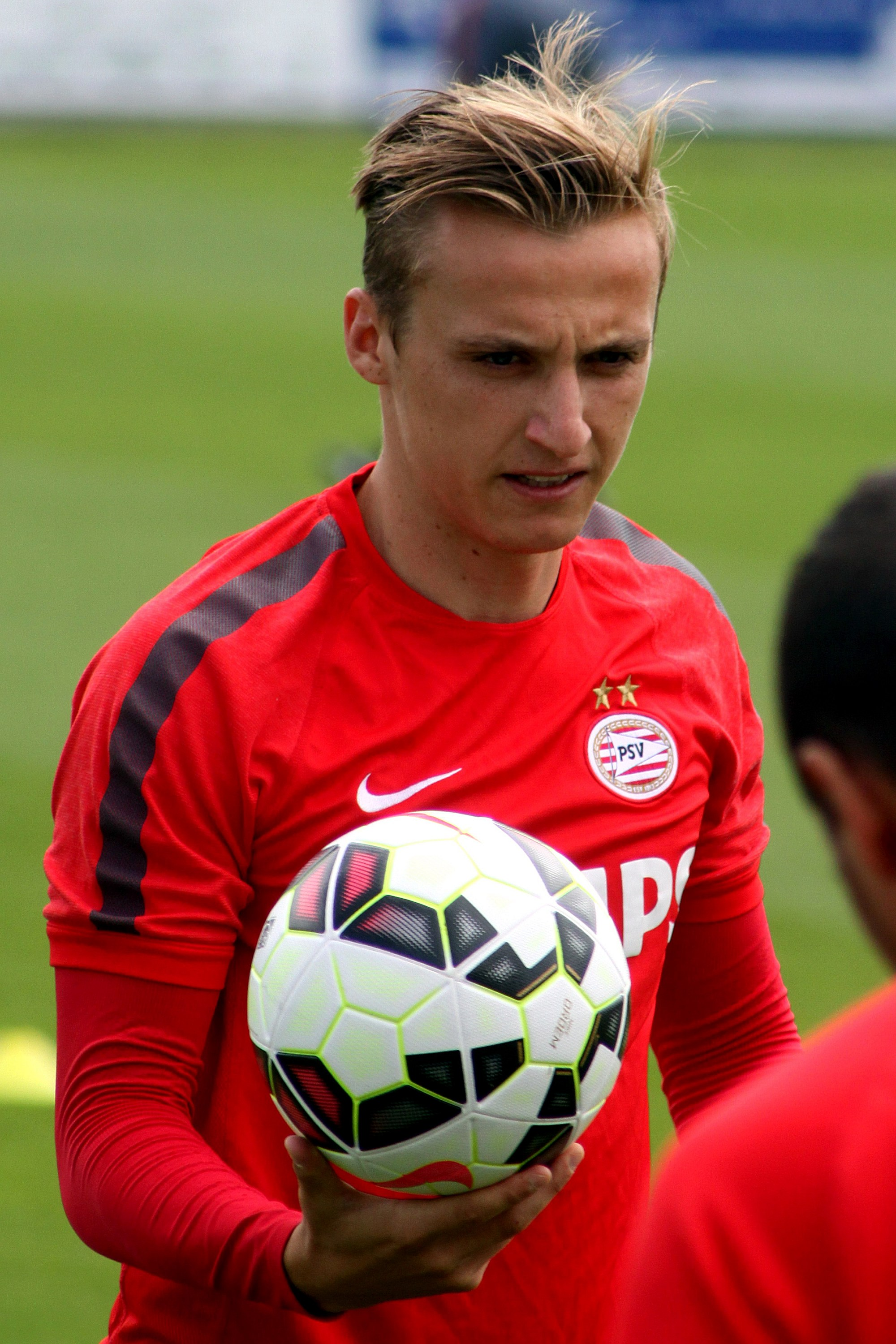
Ritzmaier holding the ball while training for PSV Eindhoven in 2014.

In February 2010, Dutch Eredivisie club PSV Eindhoven signed the Austrian teenage midfielder from Austria Kärnten on a contract running until 30 June 2012 and was immediately assigned to the second team, Jong PSV. The move materialised after he had been invited to the club's training camp three months prior to the move.

In January 2011, Ritzmaier was called up to the first team for the club's training camp. Six months later, he signed a two-year contract extension. Ritzmaier made his PSV debut, coming on as a 74th-minute substitute, in a 3–0 win over FC Lisse in the third round of the KNVB Cup. On 30 November 2011, he made his UEFA Europa League debut, coming on as a 77th-minute substitute in a 3–0 win over Legia Warsaw to qualify for the knockout stage. Ritzmaier then started the whole game, in a central midfield position, winning 2–1 over Rapid București on 16 December 2011. By the end of the 2011–12 season, he had made three appearances in all competitions.

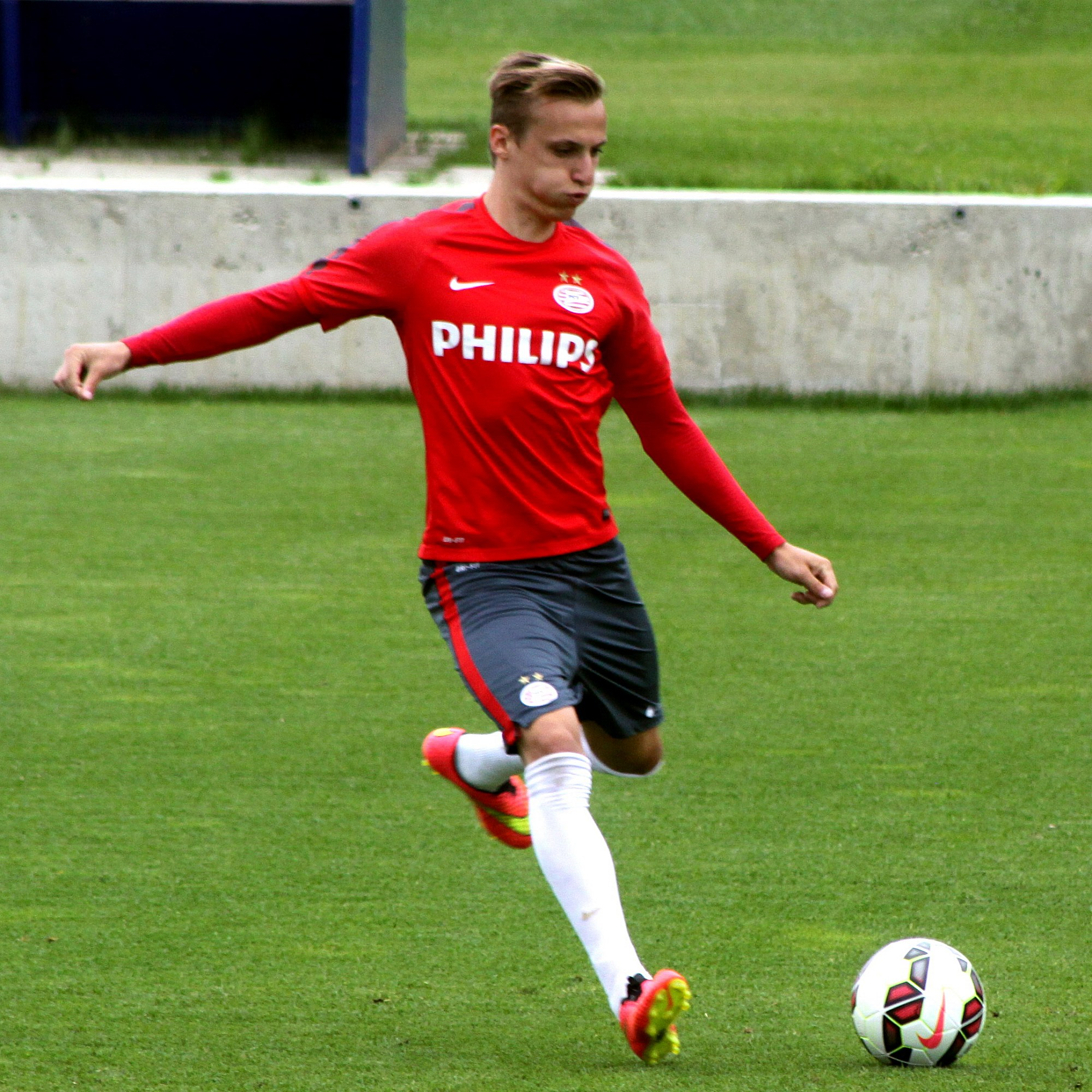
Ritzmaier preparing to kick the ball while training with PSV in 2014.

At the start of the 2012–13 season, Ritzmaier played in both legs of the Europa League play–off round against Montenegrin club Zeta, as PSV won 14–0 on aggregate to send them through to the group stage. Having spent the first five league matches on the substitute bench, he made his league debut for the club, playing the entire game in a 3–0 win over Feyenoord on 23 September 2012. Ritzmaier made four more appearances for the side in the first team before suffering a shoulder injury that kept him out for several months. Despite recovering from his injury, his first team opportunities continued to be limited and he was considered to be loaned out by PSV, but this never happened. He made his next first team appearance on 12 May 2013, his first in seven months, in a 3–1 loss against Twente. By the end of the 2012–13 season, Ritzmaier had made eight appearances in all competitions.

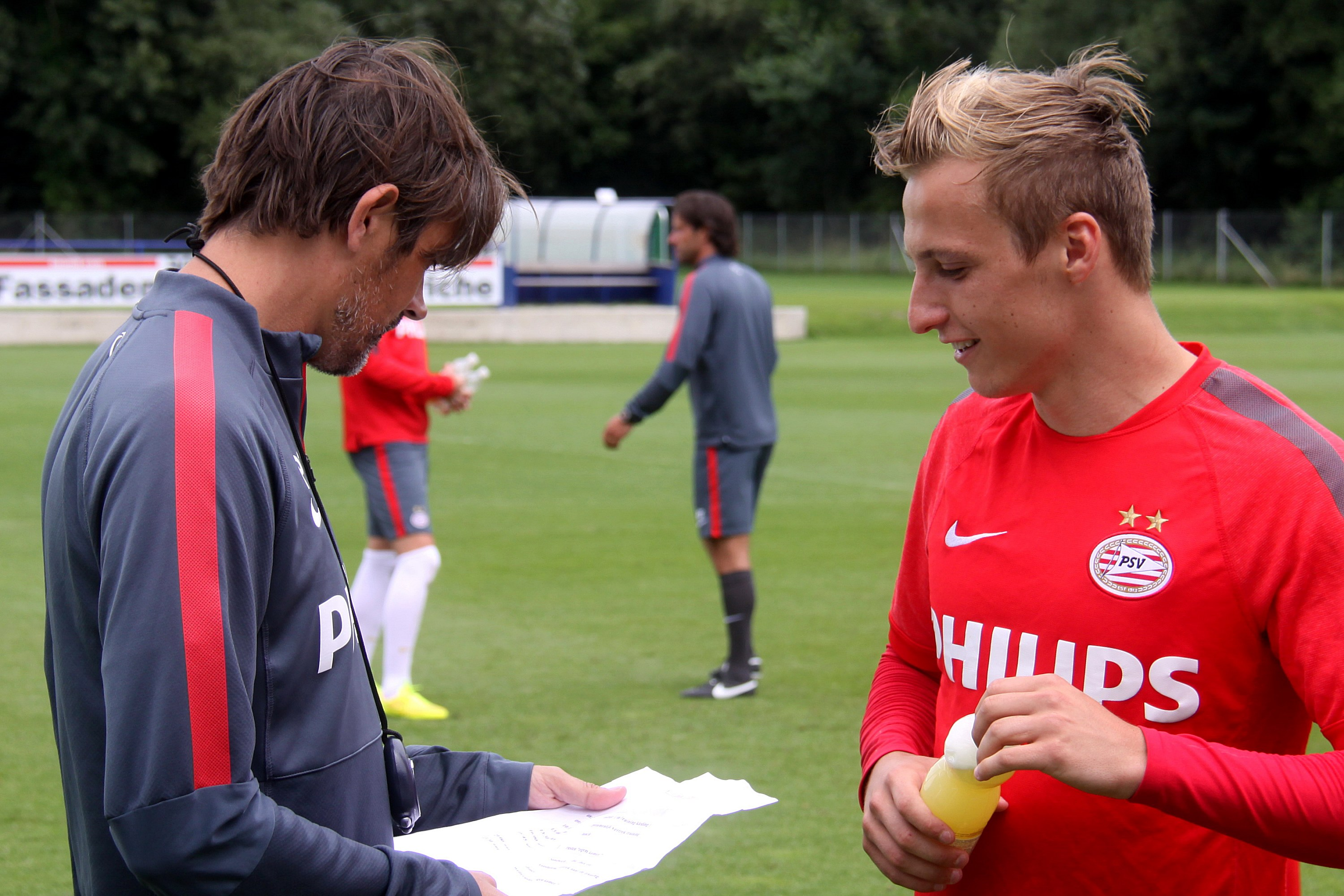
Ritzmaier receiving advice from manager Phillip Cocu.

Ritzmaier was then loaned out to SC Cambuur in the summer of the 2013. During his loan spell at SC Cambuur, Ritzmaier signed a contract extension with PSV, keeping him until 2015, and then later signed another contract extension with the club, keeping him until 2018. At the start of the 2014–15 season, he played in both legs of the Europa League third round fixture against Austrian club SKN St. Pölten, winning 4–2 on aggregate. However, Ritzmaier found his first team opportunities limited once again, mostly coming from the substitute role. As a result, he was sent to play for the club's second team throughout the 2014–15 season. Ritzmaier acknowledged this, saying: "Of course that is a small setback, but the season is still long and I hope that I will get my chance. And then it is up to me to show what I can do. Play as much as possible, make the minutes and be important to the team." Manager Phillip Cocu spoke about Ritzmaier's situation, saying: "Marcel must and can continue to grow, there is still plenty of room in it." This led to speculation about his departure in the January transfer window, but the club convinced him to stay. By the end of the 2014–15 season, he had made sixteen appearances in all competitions.

Upon returning to PSV after being loaned out for the last two seasons, Ritzmaier spent the rest of the 2017–18 season playing for the reserve side. He continued to stay at the club throughout the 2017–18 season. It was announced on 3 April 2018 that his contract would not be extended at the end of the 2017–18 season. With Georginio Wijnaldum, Memphis Depay, Dries Mertens, Jeremain Lens, Kevin Strootman and Jetro Willems in his team, Ritzmaier's prospects of playing time were diminished.

==== Loan spells ====
After appearing once with PSV's reserve team Jong PSV, playing in their first Eerste Divisie match against Sparta Rotterdam at the start of the 2013–14 season, Ritzmaier was loaned out to Cambuur for the remainder of the season. He made his Cambuur debut, playing the whole game, in a 4–1 win against Groningen on 17 August 2013. He scored his first goal for the club on 24 September in a 6–1 win against VV Katwijk in the second round of the KNVB Cup. A month later on 26 October 2013, he scored his second goal for the club, in a 3–1 win over Utrecht. Three days later on 29 October 2013, Ritzmaier scored against NAC Breda in the third round of the KNVB Cup and Cambuur went on to win 5–3 in a penalty shootout Two months later on 7 December 2013, he assisted a goal for Michiel Hemmen, who scored twice, in a 2–2 draw against RKC Waalwijk. However, in a follow–up match against RKC Waalwijk, Ritzmaier was sent–off for a second bookable offence, in a 2–1 loss against Ajax. After serving a one-match suspension, he scored on his return, in a 2–0 win over Go Ahead Eagles. This was followed up by setting up the club's second goal of the game, in a 3–1 win against Heerenveen. He then scored his third goal of the season, in a 3–1 win against PEC Zwolle on 16 February 2014. However, Ritzmaier was sent off for the second time for a second bookable offence, in a 1–1 draw against NEC Nijmegen on 5 April 2014. Since joining the club, he became a first team regular for the side, playing in the midfield position. Ritzmaier also made six assists during his stint at Cambuur. This proved to be a successful spell for him, as he made 33 appearances and scored three goals in all competitions.

Having been linked a move away from PSV Eindhoven, Ritzmaier was loaned out to NEC for the 2015–16 season. He made his NEC debut, starting the whole game and played 84 minutes before being substituted, in a 1–0 loss to Willem II on 28 August 2015. Ritzmaier then scored his first goal for the club, in a 3–0 win against VV Noordwijk in the third round of the KNVB Cup. He set up the club's third goal of the game, in a 4–1 win against ADO Den Haag on 3 October 2015. Ritzmaier set up three goals between 29 October 2015 and 1 November 2015, including twice against AZ. He scored his second goal for NEC on 7 February 2016 in a 1–1 draw against De Graafschap. Having initially become a first team regular, Ritzmaier soon found his playing time, mostly coming from the substitute bench. Until the end of the 2015–16 season, he went on to make 23 appearances and scoring two times in all competitions. Following this, Ritzmaier returned to PSV.

Having been linked a move away from PSV, Ritzmaier was loaned out to Go Ahead Eagles for the 2016–17 season. He made his Go Ahead Eagles debut, playing the whole game, in a 3–0 loss to Ajax on 28 August 2016. Since making his debut for the club, Ritzmaier quickly became a first team regular for Go Ahead Eagles, where he rotated in playing in the midfield and left–back positions. On 11 February 2017, Ritzmaier scored his first goal for the club, in a 3–1 win over ADO Den Haag. However, he suffered an arm injury during a 3–1 loss to PSV on 11 March 2017 and was sidelined for weeks. Ritzmaier returned to the starting line–up against Twente on 2 April 2017 and scored his second goal for the club as well as setting up the club's first goal of the game, in a 2–1 win. However, he received a straight red card in the 80th minute, losing 4–0 to Ajax, resulting in Go Ahead Eagles' relegation to Eerste Divisie and missed the last game of the season. Despite missing three matches by the end of the 2016–17 season, Ritzmaier made thirty appearances and scored two times in all competitions.

=== Wolfsberger AC ===
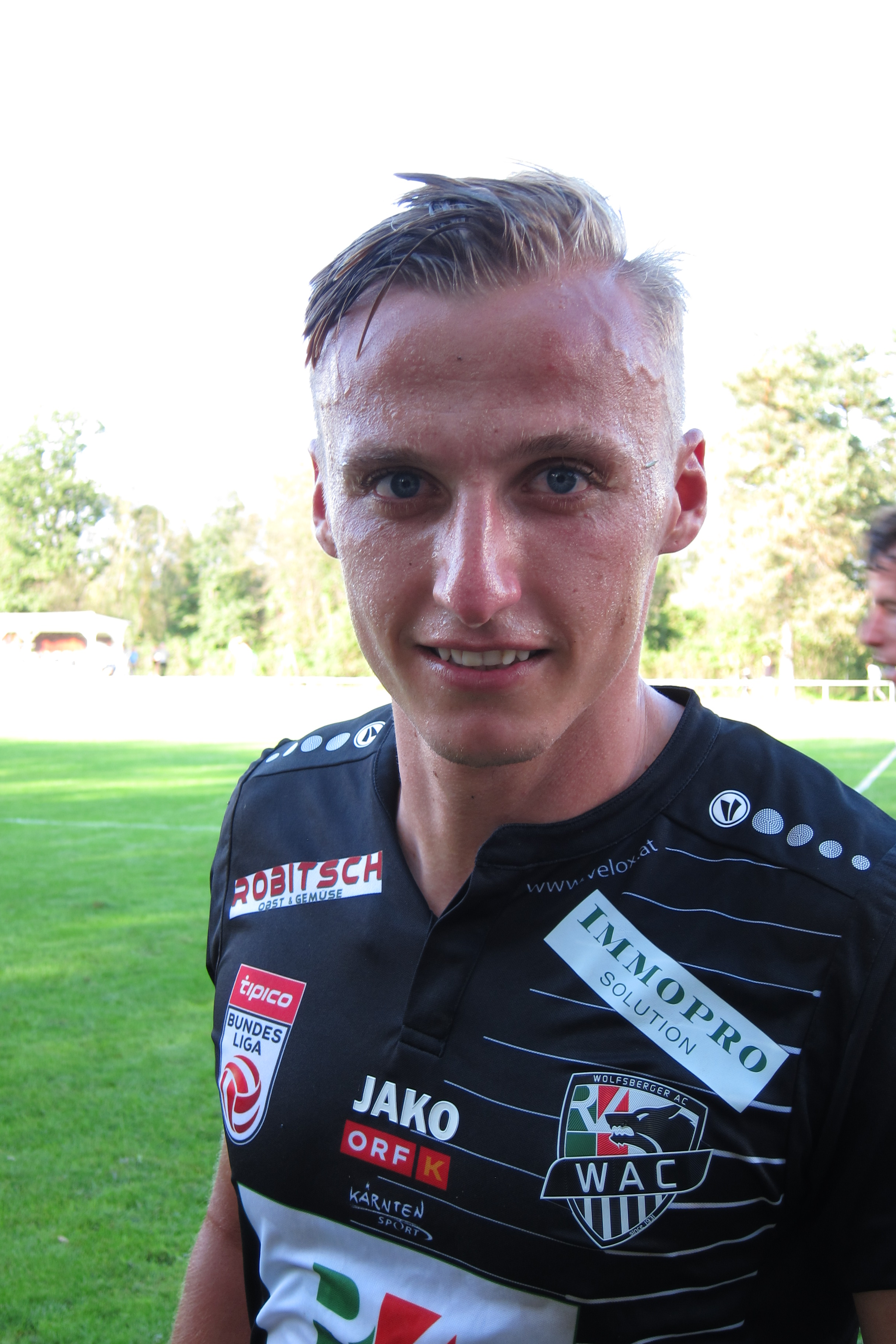
Ritzmaier pictured during his time at Wolfsberger AC.

Ritzmaier joined Wolfsberger AC for the 2018–19 season, signing a one–year contract with an option to extend.

Ritzmaier made his Wolfsberger AC's debut in the opening game of the season against SKN St. Pölten, where he set up the club's third goal of the game, in a 4–3 loss. Three weeks later on 18 August 2012, Ritzmaier assisted two goals, in a 6–0 win against SV Mattersburg. Since making his debut for the club, he became a first team regular for the side, playing in the midfield position. Ritzmaier, once again, assisted two goals, in a 3–1 win against Rapid Wien on 11 November 2018. During a match against TSV Hartberg on 10 March 2019, in which he assisted a goal, in a 1–1 draw, Ritzmaier was sent–off for a second bookable offence. It was announced on 19 April 2019 that he signed a contract extension with Wolfsberger AC. Ritzmaier then scored his first goal for the club, in a 2–1 win against Red Bull Salzburg on 28 April 2019. Despite missing two more matches along the way, he made 32 appearances and scoring once in all competitions.

At the start of the 2019–20 season, Ritzmaier continued to establish himself in the midfield position for the club. He started the season well by scoring and assisting two goals, in a 9–0 win against SAK Klagenfurt in the first round of the ÖFB Cup. On 15 September 2019, Ritzmaier scored his second goal of the season, in a 3–0 win against Austria Wien. His fourth goal of the season then came on 6 October 2019 against SKN St. Pölten, as well as, setting up the club's fourth goal of the game, winning 4–0. He played Europa League with WAC, against Borussia Mönchengladbach, Roma, and İstanbul Başakşehir. After surprising results in the beginning WAC dropped out in the group stage.

=== Barnsley ===
Ritzmaier followed his coach Gerhard Struber to join Barnsley on 6 January 2020, signing a two–year contract.

Ritzmaier made his Barnsley debut, playing the whole game, in a 2–1 win against Huddersfield Town on 11 January 2020. However, he suffered an injury that saw him miss four matches. On 22 February 2020, Ritzmaier returned to the starting line–up, coming on as a late substitute, in a 1–0 win against Middlesbrough. Since joining the club, Ritzmaier became a first-team regular, and by the time the season was suspended because of the COVID-19 pandemic, he had made seven league appearances. He remained an integral part of the team once the season resumed behind closed doors, and guided Barnsley to securing Championship football for a second successive season. It was helped by Wigan Athletic falling into administration and getting 12 points deduction. Wigan appealed the 12 points deduction and lost, meaning Barnsley would stay in the EFL Championship for the 2020–21 season. By the end of the 2019–20 season, Ritzmaier had made sixteen appearances in all competitions.

On 5 October 2020, Ritzmaier joined Rapid Wien on loan for the 2020–21 season.

=== SV Sandhausen ===
Ritzmaier moved to 2. Bundesliga club SV Sandhausen in August 2021.

=== SKN St. Pölten ===
On 5 July 2023, Ritzmaier returned to Austria and signed a two-year contract, with an optional third year, with SKN St. Pölten.

== International career ==
Ritzmaier represented from Austria under-16 to Austria under-21. He then played nine games and scored three goals for the Austria U17.

In September 2012, Ritzmaier was called up to the Austria under-21 for the first time. He made his Austria U21 debut, coming on as a 60th-minute substitute, in a 3–2 win against Scotland under-21 on 10 September 2012. In a follow–up match against DR Congo U21, Ritzmaier scored twice for the U21 side, winning 5–1. He then scored his third goal for the U21 side, winning 3–1 against Malta U21 on 6 February 2013. A year later, Ritzmaier was called up to the U21 squad and featured two more times. He went on to make nine appearances and scoring three times for Austria under-21 side.

== Personal life ==
His brother Christian is a professional footballer for DSV Leoben.

== Career statistics ==
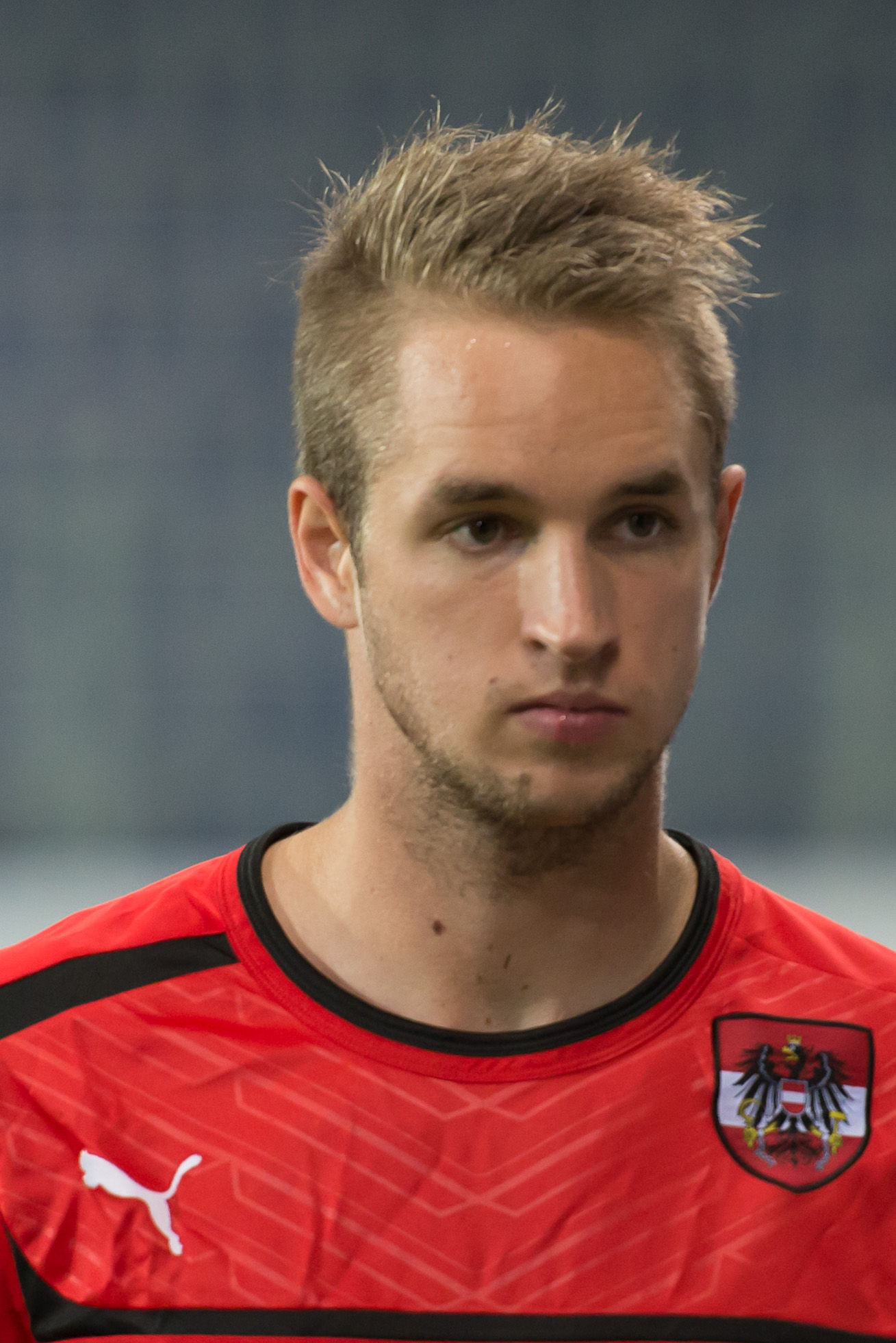
Ritzmaier pictured while playing for Austria under-21 in 2014.

As of match played 6 August 2021

Appearances and goals by club, season and competition
Club	Season	League			Cup		League Cup		Other		Total	
Club	Season	Division	Apps	Goals	Apps	Goals	Apps	Goals	Apps	Goals	Apps	Goals
Austria Kärnten	2009–10	Austrian Bundesliga	1	0	0	0	—		0	0	1	0
PSV	2011–12	Eredivisie	0	0	1	0	—		2 (Note: Appearances in UEFA Europa League)	0	3	0
PSV	2012–13	Eredivisie	4	0	2	0	—		2	0	8	0
PSV	2013–14	Eredivisie	0	0	0	0	—		0	0	0	0
PSV	2014–15	Eredivisie	5	0	3	0	—		8	0	16	0
PSV	2015–16	Eredivisie	0	0	0	0	—		0	0	0	0
PSV	2016–17	Eredivisie	0	0	0	0	—		0	0	0	0
PSV	Total		9	0	6	0	—		12	0	27	0
Jong PSV	2013–14	Eerste Divisie	1	0	—		—		—		1	0
Jong PSV	2014–15	Eerste Divisie	9	4	—		—		—		9	4
Jong PSV	2015–16	Eerste Divisie	2	0	—		—		—		2	0
Jong PSV	2017–18	Eerste Divisie	30	2	—		—		—		30	2
Jong PSV	Total		42	6	—		—		—		42	6
Cambuur (loan)	2013–14	Eredivisie	31	3	3	2	—		—		34	5
NEC (loan)	2015–16	Eredivisie	20	1	3	1	—		—		23	2
Go Ahead Eagles (loan)	2016–17	Eredivisie	28	2	2	0	—		—		30	2
Wolfsberger AC	2018–19	Austrian Bundesliga	29	1	3	0	—		0	0	32	1
Wolfsberger AC	2019–20	Austrian Bundesliga	18	2	2	1	—		5	1	25	4
Wolfsberger AC	Total		47	3	5	1	—		5	1	57	5
Barnsley	2019–20	EFL Championship	15	0	1	0	0	0	—		16	0
Barnsley	2020–21	EFL Championship	3	0	0	0	3	0	—		6	0
Barnsley	Total		18	0	1	0	3	0	—		22	0
Rapid Wien (loan)	2020–21	Austrian Bundesliga	24	2	2	2	—		4	1	30	5
Career total			220	17	22	6	3	0	21	2	266	25
