= Aristot Tambwe-Kasengele =

Congolese footballer (born 2004)

Personal information
- Date of birth: 4 June 2004 (age 22)
- Height: 1.87 m (6 ft 2 in)
- Position: Centre-back

Team information
- Current team: Admira Wacker
- Number: 36

Youth career
- 2012–2013: SC Elite
- 2013–2014: SC Großfeld
- 2014–2017: SV Donau
- 2017–2021: Rapid Wien

Senior career*
Years	Team	Apps	(Gls)
2021–2025	Rapid Wien II	71	(0)
2022–2025	Rapid Wien	1	(0)
2025–	Admira Wacker	11	(0)
- * Club domestic league appearances and goals as of 17 May 2026

Aristot Tambwe-Kasengele (born 4 June 2004) is a DR Congo footballer who plays as a centre-back for Admira Wacker.

== Career statistics ==
=== Club ===
As of 22 October 2021.

Club	Season	League			Cup		Continental		Other		Total	
Club	Season	Division	Apps	Goals	Apps	Goals	Apps	Goals	Apps	Goals	Apps	Goals
Rapid Wien II	2021–22	2. Liga	2	0	–		–		0	0	2	0
Career total			2	0	0	0	0	0	0	0	2	0
