= Lukas Sulzbacher =

Austrian footballer

Personal information
- Date of birth: 6 April 2000 (age 26)
- Place of birth: Vienna, Austria
- Height: 1.71 m (5 ft 7 in)
- Position: Right back

Youth career
- 2005–2007: Königstetten
- 2007–2018: Rapid Wien

Senior career*
Years	Team	Apps	(Gls)
2018–2022	Rapid Wien II	81	(3)
2020–2021	Rapid Wien	1	(0)
2022–2026	Tirol	85	(2)

International career^{‡}
2015	Austria U15	2	(0)
2015–2016	Austria U16	6	(0)
2016–2017	Austria U17	9	(0)
2017–2018	Austria U18	6	(0)
2018	Austria U19	6	(0)
2019–2020	Austria U20	2	(0)
2021–2022	Austria U21	5	(1)
- * Club domestic league appearances and goals as of 10 June 2026 ‡ National team caps and goals as of 16:54, 26 August 2022 (UTC)

Lukas Sulzbacher (born 6 April 2000) is an Austrian professional footballer who plays as a right back.

== Club career ==
Sulzbacher is a product of the youth academies of Königstetten and Rapid Wien. He made his professional debut with Rapid Wien in a 4-1 UEFA Europa League loss to Arsenal F.C. on 3 December 2020. He ended up making 3 appearances for the club in the Europa League and 1 in the Austrian Football Bundesliga, but his career with Rapid Wien was blighted by injuries and the COVID-19 outbreak. On 30 July 2022, he transferred to WSG Tirol.

== International career ==
Sulzbacher is a youth international for Austria at all levels, having played with them until Austria U21s.
