= Koya Kitagawa =

Japanese footballer

Koya Kitagawa 北川 航也
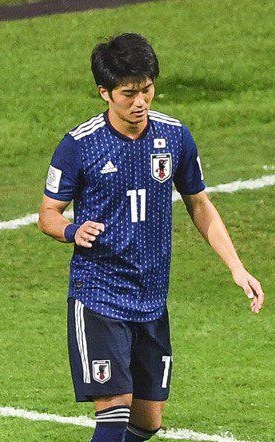
- Kitagawa with Japan in 2019

Personal information
- Date of birth: 26 July 1996 (age 30)
- Place of birth: Shizuoka City, Japan
- Height: 1.80 m (5 ft 11 in)
- Positions: Forward; winger

Team information
- Current team: Shimizu S-Pulse
- Number: 23

Youth career
- Pure FC
- Johoku SSS
- –2014: Shimizu S-Pulse

Senior career*
Years	Team	Apps	(Gls)
2015–2019	Shimizu S-Pulse	115	(34)
2015	→ J. League U-22 (loan)	4	(0)
2019–2022	Rapid Wien	50	(5)
2022–	Shimizu S-Pulse	127	(30)

International career^{‡}
2018–2019	Japan	8	(0)
Medal record
Representing Japan
AFC Asian Cup
Silver medal – second place	2019 United Arab Emirates
AFC U-16 Championship
Silver medal – second place	2012 Iran
- * Club domestic league appearances and goals as of 10 August 2026 ‡ National team caps and goals as of 3 July 2024

Koya Kitagawa (北川 航也, Kitagawa Kōya; born 26 July 1996) is a Japanese professional footballer who plays as a forward or a winger for Shimizu S-Pulse.

== Career statistics ==
=== Club ===
As of 3 July 2024

Appearances and goals by club, season and competition
Club	Season	League			National Cup		League Cup		Continental		Total	
Club	Season	Division	Apps	Goals	Apps	Goals	Apps	Goals	Apps	Goals	Apps	Goals
Shimizu S-Pulse	2015	J1 League	7	1	1	0	5	1	–		13	2
Shimizu S-Pulse	2016	J2 League	30	9	4	0	–		–		34	9
Shimizu S-Pulse	2017	J1 League	26	5	2	0	4	2	–		32	7
Shimizu S-Pulse	2018	J1 League	32	13	2	0	3	1	–		37	14
Shimizu S-Pulse	2019	J1 League	20	6	1	0	3	1	–		24	7
Shimizu S-Pulse	Total		115	34	10	0	15	5	0	0	140	39
Rapid Wien	2019–20	Austrian Bundesliga	19	2	1	1	–		–		20	3
Rapid Wien	2020–21	Austrian Bundesliga	17	3	3	0	–		5 (Note: Appearances in UEFA Europa League)	1	25	4
Rapid Wien / Rapid Wien II	2021–22	Austrian Bundesliga / 2. Liga	14	1	2	0	–		7 (Note: Appearances in UEFA Europa League and UEFA Conference League)	0	23	1
Total			50	6	6	1	0	0	12	1	68	8
Shimizu S-Pulse	2022	J1 League	10	1	–		–		–		10	1
Shimizu S-Pulse	2023	J2 League	35	4	1	0	4	1	–		40	5
Shimizu S-Pulse	2024	J2 League	20	9	1	1	0	0	–		21	10
Career total			230	54	18	2	19	6	12	1	279	63

1. He played 12 matches for the Bundesliga, with no goals scored, and played 2 matches in the 2. Liga for the Reserve Team (Rapid Wien II), scoring 1 goal in 2 matches with them.

=== International ===
Appearances and goals by national team and year
National team	Year	Apps	Goals
Japan	2018	3	0
Japan	2019	5	0
Total		8	0
