= Bernhard Unger =

Austrian footballer (born 1999)

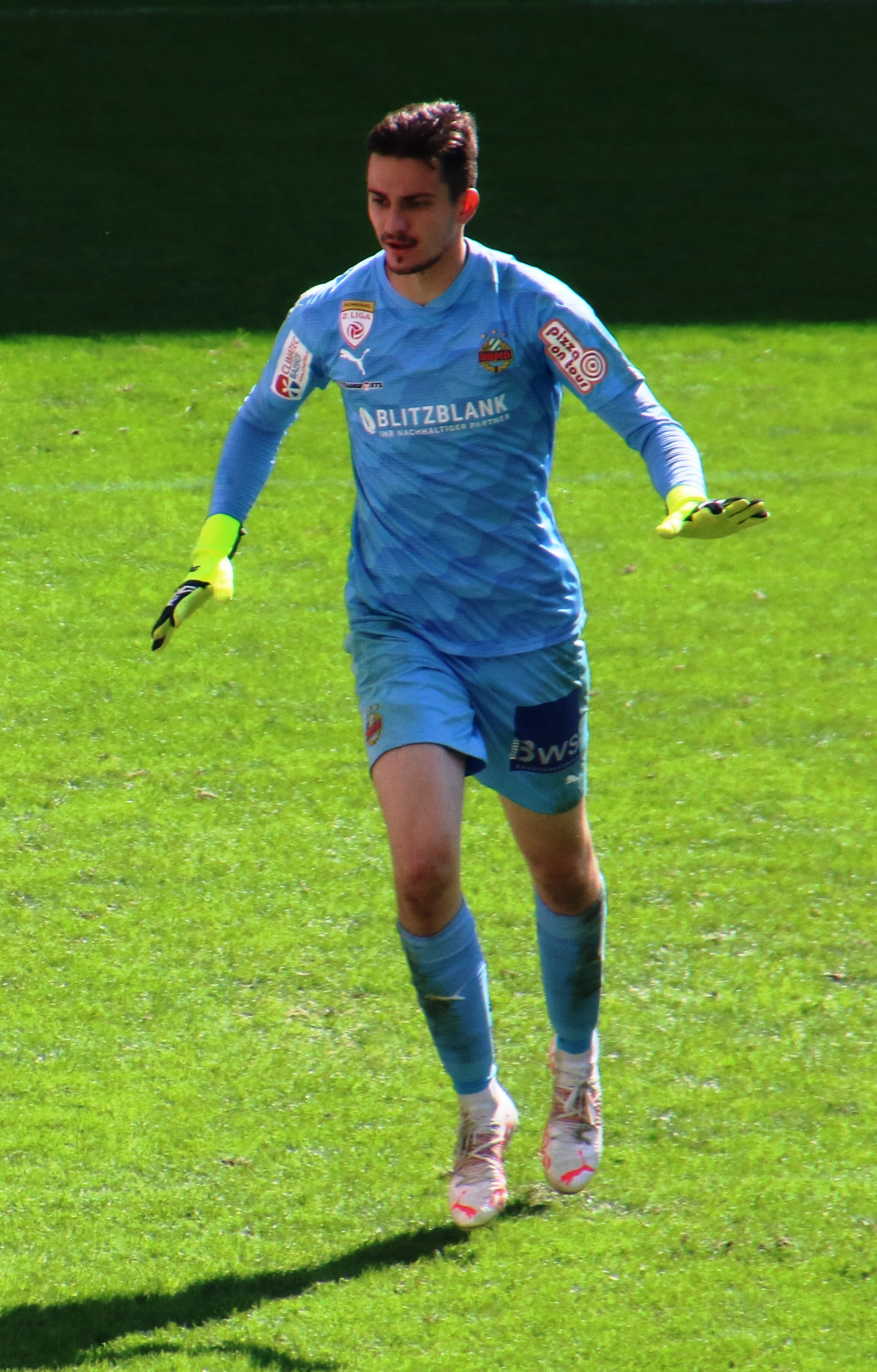
- Unger in 2021

Personal information
- Date of birth: 23 April 1999 (age 27)
- Place of birth: Vienna, Austria
- Height: 1.90 m (6 ft 3 in)
- Position: Goalkeeper

Team information
- Current team: First Vienna
- Number: 1

Youth career
- 2008–2018: Sollenau
- 2010–2013: Wiener Neustadt
- 2013–2018: Mattersburg

Senior career*
Years	Team	Apps	(Gls)
2018–2020	Mattersburg II	25	(1)
2020	Mattersburg	1	(0)
2020–2024	Rapid Wien II	11	(0)
2020–2024	SK Rapid Wien	1	(0)
2024–	First Vienna	52	(0)
- * Club domestic league appearances and goals as of 17 May 2026

Bernhard Unger (born 23 April 1999) is an Austrian professional footballer who plays as a goalkeeper for 2. Liga club First Vienna.

== Club career ==
Unger made his professional debut with Mattersburg in a 1-0 Austrian Bundesliga loss to Rapid Wien on 4 July 2020. On 19 August 2019, Unger signed a contract with Rapid Wien.
