= Dragoljub Savić =

Serbian footballer

Personal information
- Date of birth: 25 April 2001 (age 25)
- Place of birth: Novi Sad, FR Yugoslavia
- Height: 1.73 m (5 ft 8 in)
- Position: Winger

Team information
- Current team: TSC
- Number: 21

Youth career
- Vojvodina

Senior career*
Years	Team	Apps	(Gls)
2019	Vojvodina	1	(0)
2019–2023	Rapid Wien II	63	(7)
2020–2023	Rapid Wien	9	(1)
2023–2025	RFS	33	(5)
2025–	TSC	49	(9)

International career
2017–2018	Serbia U17 (Note: Official competitive UEFA matches only.)	9	(2)
2019	Serbia U19	3	(0)
- * Club domestic league appearances and goals as of 13 June 2026

Dragoljub Savić (Serbian Cyrillic: Драгољуб Савић; born 25 April 2001) is a Serbian professional footballer who plays as a winger for Neftchi PFK.

== Club career ==
=== Vojvodina ===
On 12 May 2019, Savić made his first team debut, replacing Aranđel Stojković in 67th minute, in 2:1 home loss to Partizan.

=== Rapid Wien ===
In summer 2019, Savić left Vojvodina and signed for Rapid Wien, where he was assigned to the reserve team. He made his Austrian Football Bundesliga debut for the senior squad on 21 June 2020 in a game against TSV Hartberg.

=== RFS ===
On 14 July 2023, Savić moved to Latvian side FK RFS.

=== Neftchi ===
On August 18, 2026, Savić officially transferred to FC "Neftchi" by signing a contract with the Baku club on a 2+1 scheme.

== Career statistics ==
=== Club ===
As of 11 May 2019

Club	Season	League			Cup		Continental		Other		Total	
Club	Season	Division	Apps	Goals	Apps	Goals	Apps	Goals	Apps	Goals	Apps	Goals
Vojvodina	2018–19	Serbian SuperLiga	1	0	0	0	—		—		1	0
Career total			1	0	0	0	—		—		1	0
