= Allianz Stadion =

Football stadium in Vienna, Austria

Coordinates: 48°11′52″N 16°15′55″E

- Weststadion

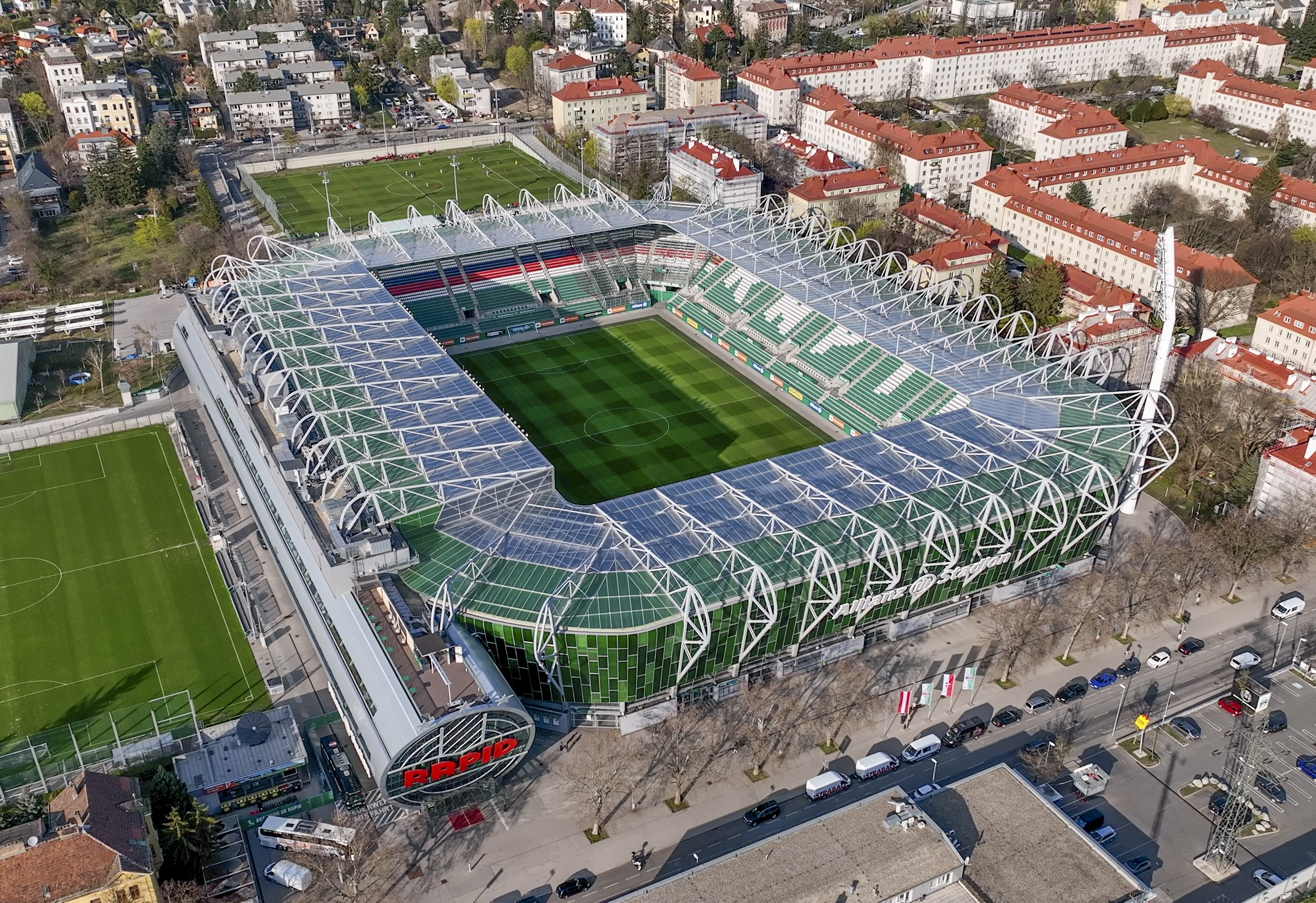
- Interactive map of Allianz Stadion
- Location: Hütteldorf, Vienna, Austria
- Capacity: 26,000 (domestic matches); 24,000 (international and European matches)

Construction
- Built: 2014
- Opened: 16 July 2016
- Cost: c. (€ 53 million)
- Main contractor: Strabag

Tenant
- Rapid Wien

Allianz Stadion is a football stadium in the Hütteldorf neighborhood of Vienna, Austria, and is the home ground of SK Rapid Wien. The stadium was built on the site of the former Gerhard Hanappi Stadium. For international matches, the stadium carries the sponsorless name of Weststadion ("Western Stadium"), due to its geographical location in the city.

The stadium was officially unveiled when Rapid Wien hosted Chelsea in a pre-season friendly on 16 July 2016.

The first competitive match took place in the new stadium on 23 July 2016 when Rapid Vienna hosted SV Ried in the first round of the Austrian Football Bundesliga. Christoph Schößwendter scored the first competitive goal in the newly opened stadium in a 5–0 victory.
