= 2023–24 SK Rapid Wien season =

Sportklub Rapid
2023–24 season
- Chairman: Alexander Wrabetz
- Head coach: Zoran Barisic (until 14 November); Robert Klauß (from 15 November)
- Stadium: Allianz Stadion
- Bundesliga: 4th (Championship round); 6th (Regular season)
- Austrian Cup: Runners-up
- UEFA Europa Conference League: Play-off round
- Top goalscorer: League: Marco Grüll (13 goals); All: Marco Grüll (21 goals)
- Highest home attendance: 26,000 vs. FK Austria Wien, 25th February 2024
- Lowest home attendance: 13,400 vs. SCR Altach, 5th August 2023
- Average home league attendance: 18,600
Home colours	Away colours

The 2023–24 season was the 126th season in the existence of the Sportklub Rapid and the club's 75th consecutive season in the top flight of Austrian football. In addition to the domestic league, Rapid participated in this season's edition of the Austrian Cup and entered international football in the third qualifying round to the UEFA Europa Conference League after coming 4th in the previous Bundesliga season.

Rapid again finished 4th in the Austrian Bundesliga and reached the final of the Austria Cup. Internationally, they were knocked out by eventual finalists ACF Fiorentina in the play-off round of the Europa Conference League.

== Squad ==
=== Squad statistics ===
No.	Nat.	Name	Age	League		Austrian Cup		UEFA Competitions		Total		Discipline		
No.	Nat.	Name	Age	Apps	Goals	Apps	Goals	Apps	Goals	Apps	Goals	Yellow card	(yellow card) (red card)	Red card
Goalkeepers
21	(Austria)	Bernhard Unger	24											
25	(Austria)	Paul Gartler	26											
45	(Austria)	Niklas Hedl	22	32		6		4		42		1		
Defenders
6	(Netherlands)	Neraysho Kasanwirjo	21	20+3		5				25+3		8		
13	(Austria)	Thorsten Schick	33	7+8		1+2		3		11+10		2		
15	(Netherlands)	Terence Kongolo	29	9+3		2+1				11+4			1	2
19	(Austria)	Michael Sollbauer	33	5+3		1		0+1		6+4		2		
20	(Austria)	Maximilian Hofmann	29	14+3		1+2		2+1		17+6		6		
22	(Slovakia)	Martin Koscelník	28	2		0+1				2+1				
23	(Austria)	Jonas Auer	22	24+2	1	4		4		32+2	1	7		
26	(Austria)	Martin Moormann	22	4+6	1	3		0+2		7+8	1	4		
43	(Austria)	Leopold Querfeld	19	28	3	6		4		38	3	9		
53	(Austria)	Dominic Vincze	19	0+2						0+2				
55	(Serbia)	Nenad Cvetković	27	6+1		1		2		9+1		3		
Midfielders
4	(Austria)	Patrick Greil	26	1+4		1+2		0+2		2+8				
5	(Austria)	Roman Kerschbaum	29	13+14		3+2	2	4		20+16	2	9		
8	(Austria)	Lukas Grgić	27	16+5	2	4+1				20+6	2	5		
10	(Germany)	Nicolas Kühn	23	16	2	2+1	1	2+1		20+2	3	2		
10	(Austria)	Christoph Lang	21	13+1	2	2	1			15+1	3	3		
16	(Barbados)	Thierry Gale	21	0+5	1	1+1				1+6	1			
18	(Austria)	Matthias Seidl	22	30+2	5	5+1	4	4	1	39+3	10	7		
22	(Sweden)	Isak Jansson	21	5+6	1	1				6+6	1	2		
24	(Germany)	Dennis Kaygin	19	2+3						2+3				
27	(Austria)	Marco Grüll	25	26+3	13	5+1	6	4	2	35+4	21	5		
28	(Austria)	Moritz Oswald	21	15+11		1+4		3		19+15		1		
29	(Austria)	Ante Bajic	27	2+4	1	1+1		0+4	1	3+9	2	2		
34	(Austria)	Nikolas Sattlberger	19	28+2		3+1		4		35+3		9	1	
Forwards
7	(Austria)	Oliver Strunz	23	1+11		1+2	2	0+2		2+15	2			
9	(Austria)	Guido Burgstaller	34	17+3	7	4	1	3	1	24+3	9	2		
17	(France)	Fally Mayulu	20	14+14	6	2+2	5	1+2		17+18	11	2		
49	(Austria)	Jovan Živković	17	0+7		0+2				0+9				
57	(France)	Ismail Seydi	21	2+4						2+4				
58	(Austria)	Furkan Dursun	18	0+5		0+1				0+6				

=== Goal scorers ===
Name	Bundesliga	Cup	International	Total
(Austria) Marco Grüll	13	6	2	21
(France) Fally Mayulu	6	5		11
(Austria) Matthias Seidl	5	4	1	10
(Austria) Guido Burgstaller	7	1	1	9
(Germany) Nicolas Kühn	2	1		3
(Austria) Christoph Lang	2	1		3
(Austria) Leopold Querfeld	3			3
(Austria) Ante Bajic	1		1	2
(Austria) Lukas Grgić	2			2
(Austria) Roman Kerschbaum		2		2
(Austria) Oliver Strunz		2		2
(Austria) Jonas Auer	1			1
(Barbados) Thierry Gale	1			1
(Sweden) Isak Jansson	1			1
(Austria) Martin Moormann	1			1
Own goals
(Albania) Drini Halili (DSV Leoben)		1		1
(Kosovo) Atdhe Nuhiu (Altach)	1			1
(Austria) Christian Ramsebner (St. Pölten)		1		1
(Ukraine) Oleksandr Romanchuk (Debrecen)			1	1
(Austria) David Schnegg (Sturm Graz)	1			1
Totals	47	24	6	77

=== Disciplinary record ===
Name	Bundesliga			Cup			International			Total		
Name	Yellow card	(yellow card) (red card)	Red card	Yellow card	(yellow card) (red card)	Red card	Yellow card	(yellow card) (red card)	Red card	Yellow card	(yellow card) (red card)	Red card
(Austria) Nikolas Sattlberger	7	1					2			9	1	
(Austria) Roman Kerschbaum	6			1			2			9		
(Austria) Leopold Querfeld	6						3			9		
(Netherlands) Neraysho Kasanwirjo	6			2						8		
(Austria) Jonas Auer	5						2			7		
(Austria) Matthias Seidl	4			1			2			7		
(Austria) Maximilian Hofmann	5						1			6		
(Austria) Lukas Grgić	5									5		
(Austria) Marco Grüll	3			1			1			5		
(Austria) Martin Moormann	2			2						4		
(Netherlands) Terence Kongolo		1	2								1	2
(Serbia) Nenad Cvetković				1			2			3		
(Austria) Christoph Lang	3									3		
(Austria) Ante Bajic	2									2		
(Austria) Guido Burgstaller	2									2		
(Sweden) Isak Jansson	2									2		
(Germany) Nicolas Kühn	1						1			2		
(France) Fally Mayulu	2									2		
(Austria) Thorsten Schick	1						1			2		
(Austria) Michael Sollbauer	2									2		
(Austria) Niklas Hedl	1									1		
(Austria) Moritz Oswald				1						1		
Totals	65	2	2	9			17			91	2	2

=== Transfers ===
==== In ====
Pos.	Nat.	Name	Age	Moved from	Type	Transfer Window	Ref.
FW	(France)	Fally Mayulu	20	(Austria) FC Blau-Weiß Linz	Free transfer	Summer	
MF	(Germany)	Dennis Kaygin	19	(Germany) 1. FSV Mainz 05 U-19	Free transfer	Summer	
DF	(Serbia)	Nenad Cvetković	27	(Israel) F.C. Ashdod	Transfer	Summer	
MF	(Austria)	Matthias Seidl	22	(Austria) FC Blau-Weiß Linz	Transfer	Summer	
MF	(Austria)	Lukas Grgić	27	(Croatia) Hajduk Split	Transfer	Summer	
FW	(Barbados)	Thierry Gale	21	(Georgia (country)) FC Dila Gori	Transfer	Summer	
DF	(Netherlands)	Neraysho Kasanwirjo	21	(Netherlands) Feyenoord Rotterdam	Loan	Summer	
DF	(Netherlands)	Terence Kongolo	29	(England) Fulham F.C.	Loan	Summer	
FW	(Austria)	Christoph Lang	22	(Austria) SK Sturm Graz	Transfer	Winter	
FW	(Sweden)	Isak Jansson	22	(Spain) FC Cartagena	Loan	Winter	

==== Out ====
Pos.	Nat.	Name	Age	Moved to	Type	Transfer Window	Ref.
DF	(Netherlands)	Denso Kasius	20	(Italy) Bologna F.C. 1909	Loan return	Summer	
DF	(Austria)	Christopher Dibon	32	(Austria) SK Rapid II		Summer	
MF	(Slovenia)	Dejan Petrovič	25	(Croatia) HNK Rijeka	Free transfer	Summer	
DF	(Austria)	Kevin Wimmer	30	(Slovakia) ŠK Slovan Bratislava	Free transfer	Summer	
FW	(Austria)	Bernhard Zimmermann	21	(Austria) Wolfsberger AC	Loan	Summer	
FW	(Austria)	René Kriwak	24	(Netherlands) FC Dordrecht	Transfer	Summer	
FW	(Netherlands)	Ferdy Druijf	25	(Netherlands) PEC Zwolle	Loan	Summer	
FW	(Serbia)	Dragoljub Savić	22	(Latvia) FK RFS	Transfer	Summer	
MF	(Austria)	Lion Schuster	22	(Germany) SV Sandhausen	Free transfer	Summer	
DF	(Slovakia)	Martin Koscelník	28	(Netherlands) NAC Breda	Transfer	Summer	
MF	(Austria)	Christoph Knasmüllner	31	(Poland) Wieczysta Kraków	Free agent	Summer	
MF	(Austria)	Patrick Greil	27	(Germany) SV Sandhausen	Free transfer	Winter	
FW	(Austria)	Ante Bajic	28	(Austria) SV Ried	Transfer	Winter	
MF	(Germany)	Nicolas-Gerrit Kühn	24	(Scotland) Celtic F.C.	Transfer	Winter	
MF	(Serbia)	Aleksa Pejić	24	(Serbia) FK TSC	Transfer	Winter	

== Pre-season and friendlies ==
Win Draw Loss Fixtures

30 June 2023 Friendly	SCU-GLD Kilb	1–4	Rapid	Kilb, Austria
	Binder 44'	Report	36' Grüll; 64' Burgstaller; 86' Seidl; 90' Bajlicz	Stadium: Waldstadion Kilb

4 July 2023 Friendly	DAC 1904	4–2	Rapid	Dunajská Streda, Slovakia
	Krstović 4' 15'; Trusa 51'; Vitális 87'	Report	40' Kühn; 64' Druijf	Stadium: MOL Aréna; Attendance: 2,000

8 July 2023 Friendly	FC Polissya Zhytomyr	1–1	Rapid	Grafenschachen, Austria
	Hitchenko 78'	Report	45' Burgstaller	Stadium: Stockwiesen-Stadion; Referee: Sara Telek

11 July 2023 Friendly	SK Sigma Olomouc	2–1	Rapid	Kirchschlag, Austria
	Juliš 14' 35'	Report	41' Seidl	Stadium: Weststadion Kirchschlag

14 July 2023 Friendly	Rapid	7–0	St. Johann/Pongau	Vienna, Austria
	Auer 23'; Grüll 51'; Seidl 56' 59'; Mayulu 82'; Bajlicz 86' 90'	Report		Stadium: Training ground

19 July 2023 Friendly	Union Berlin	3–0	Rapid	Berlin, Germany
	Behrens 53' 74'; Fofana 56'	Report		Stadium: Stadion An der Alten Försterei; Attendance: 17,284; Referee: Florian Lechner

8 September 2023 Friendly	SKU Amstetten	1–6	Rapid	Amstetten, Austria
	Toro 38'	Report	3' 19' Greil; 42' Mayulu; 71' 79' Kühn; 72' Strunz	Stadium: Ertl-Glas-Stadion; Attendance: 1,230

12 October 2023 Friendly	First Vienna	1–4	Rapid	Klosterneuburg, Austria
	Bumbić 57'	Report	4' 11' Burgstaller; 17' Greil; 76' Živković	Stadium: IMMOunited Arena; Attendance: 800

17 November 2023 Friendly	Admira Wacker	2–1	Rapid	Maria Enzersdorf, Austria
	Stevanović 18'; Young 31'	Report	72' Mayulu	Stadium: Datenpol Arena; Attendance: 500

13 January 2024 Friendly	Rapid	5–0	Wr. Sport-Club	Vienna, Austria
	Sattlberger 41'; Seidl 50' 65'; Zivković 57'; Mayulu 84'	Report		Stadium: Training ground Attendance: 500

18 January 2024 Friendly	Slovácko	1–2	Rapid	Belek, Turkey
	Moormann 59' (o.g.)		69' (pen.) Mayulu; 90' (pen.) Kaygin

25 January 2024 Friendly	Szeged-Csanád	1–1	Rapid	Belek, Turkey
	Bíró 43'		86' Sattlberger

25 January 2024 Friendly	Legia Warsaw	1–1	Rapid	Belek, Turkey
	77' (pen.) Josué		60' Burgstaller

21 March 2024 Friendly	Rapid	3–0	First Vienna	Vienna, Austria
	Abazovic 36' (o.g.); Burgstaller 44' 56'	Report		Stadium: Allianz Stadion

== Competitions ==
=== Overall record ===
Competition	First match	Last match	Starting round	Final position	Record							
Competition	First match	Last match	Starting round	Final position	Pld	W	D	L	GF	GA	GD	Win %
Austrian Football Bundesliga	28 July 2023	19 May 2023		4th	32	11	12	9	47	35	+12	34.38
Austrian Cup	23 July 2023	1 May 2023	Round 1	Runner-up	6	5	0	1	24	6	+18	83.33
Conference League	10 August 2023	31 August 2023	Third qualifying round	Play-off round	4	2	1	1	6	2	+4	50.00
Total					42	18	13	11	77	43	+34	42.86

Source: Soccerway

=== Austrian Football Bundesliga ===
==== Results summary ====
Overall								Home						Away					
Pld	W	D	L	GF	GA	GD	Pts	W	D	L	GF	GA	GD	W	D	L	GF	GA	GD
32	11	12	9	47	35	+12	45	4	7	5	23	21	+2	7	5	4	24	14	+10

Source: Austrian Football Bundesliga

==== Results by round ====
Round	1	2	3	4	5	6	7	8	9	10	11	12	13	14	15	16	17	18	19	20	21	22	23	24	25	26	27	28	29	30	31	32
Ground	A	H	H	A	H	A	H	H	A	A	H	H	A	A	H	A	H	A	A	H	H	A	H	A	A	H	A	H	A	H	A	H
Result	D	W	L	W	D	L	D	D	D	W	L	D	W	L	W	W	L	W	D	W	D	D	D	W	D	D	L	L	L	W	W	L
Position	7	5	6	3	4	6	6	7	8	6	6	6	6	8	7	6	6	6	6	6	6	6	4	4	3	4	4	4	5	4	4	4

Source: Austrian Football Bundesliga
A = Away; H = Home; W = Win; D = Draw; L = Loss

==== Regular season ====
===== Table =====
Pos	Team	Pld	W	D	L	GF	GA	GD	Pts	Qualification
4	Austria Klagenfurt	22	8	10	4	29	27	+2	34 (Note: Head to head points: Klagenfurt 4, TSV Hartberg 1.)	Qualification for the Championship round
5	Hartberg	22	9	7	6	33	28	+5	34	Qualification for the Championship round
6	Rapid Wien	22	8	9	5	38	21	+17	33 (Note: Head to head points: Rapid 4, Austria Wien 1.)	Qualification for the Championship round
7	Austria Wien	22	9	6	7	25	22	+3	33	Qualification for the Relegation round
8	Wolfsberger AC	22	8	6	8	29	32	−3	30	Qualification for the Relegation round

Source: Austrian Football Bundesliga
Rules for classification: 1) Points; 2) Head-to-head record; 3) Goal difference; 4) Goals scored; 5) Matches won; 6) Away matches won; 7) Away goals scored.

===== Matches =====
28 July 2023 1	LASK	1–1	Rapid	Linz
20:30	Luckeneder 90+5'	Report	23' Seidl	Stadium: Raiffeisen Arena; Attendance: 16,790; Referee: Christian-Petru Ciochirca

5 August 2023 2	Rapid	4–0	Altach	Vienna
17:00	Kühn 29' 34'; Auer 59'; Burgstaller 69'	Report		Stadium: Allianz Stadion; Attendance: 15,400; Referee: Alexander Harkam

13 August 2023 3	Rapid	0–1	Hartberg	Vienna
17:00		Report	68' Urdl	Stadium: Allianz Stadion; Attendance: 15,600; Referee: Christopher Jäger

20 August 2023 4	BW Linz	0–5	Rapid	Linz
17:00		Report	12' 22' Burgstaller; 64' Querfeld; 79' Bajic; 90+2' (pen.) Mayulu	Stadium: Donauparkstadion; Attendance: 5,595; Referee: Walter Altman

27 August 2023 5	Rapid	1–1	Wattens	Vienna
17:00	Seidl 60'		8' Kronberger	Stadium: Allianz Stadion; Attendance: 15,900; Referee: Sebastian Gishamer

3 September 2023 6	Red Bull	2–0	Rapid	Wals-Siezenheim
17:00	Šimić 13' 35'	Report		Stadium: Red Bull Arena; Attendance: 17,089; Referee: Alexander Harkam

17 September 2023 7	Rapid	3–3	Wolfsberg	Vienna
17:00	Mayulu 29'; Querfeld 41'; Kongolo (red card) 65'; Moormann 84'	Report	69' (pen.) 76' Bamba; 90+7' Sabitzer	Stadium: Allianz Stadion; Attendance: 17,200; Referee: Alan Kijas

24 September 2023 8	Rapid	1–1	Sturm	Vienna
17:00	Schnegg 21' (o.g.)	Report	25' Prass	Stadium: Allianz Stadion; Attendance: 21,600; Referee: Stefan Ebner

1 October 2023 9	Austria Wien	0–0	Rapid	Vienna
17:00	Holland (yellow card) (red card) 52'; Braunöder (red card) 54'	Report		Stadium: Generali Arena; Referee: Alexander Harkam

7 October 2023 10	Lustenau	0–5	Rapid	Lustenau
17:00		Report	10' (pen.) 13' Grüll; 27' Mayulu; 62' Seidl; 81' Grgić	Stadium: Reichshofstadion; Referee: Daniel Pfister

22 October 2023 11	Rapid	2–3	Klagenfurt	Vienna
17:00	Burgstaller 12'; Querfeld 90+2'	Report	61' 66' Karweina; 74' Schwarz	Stadium: Allianz Stadion; Attendance: 17,630; Referee: Sebastian Gishammer

29 October 2023 12	Rapid	3–3	LASK	Vienna
17:00	Grgić 15'; Sattlberger (yellow card) (red card) 78'; Grüll 90+1' (pen.); Gale 90+7'	Report	22' 72' Ljubičić; 90+6' Balić	Stadium: Allianz Stadion; Attendance: 18,600; Referee: Walter Altman

5 November 2023 13	Altach	0–2	Rapid	Altach
14:30		Report	65' Burgstaller; 69' (o.g.) Nuhiu	Stadium: Cashpoint Arena; Referee: Stefan Ebner

11 November 2023 14	Hartberg	1–0	Rapid	Hartberg
17:00	Lang 6'	Report		Stadium: Profertil Arena; Attendance: 5,000; Referee: Christopher Jäger

26 November 2023 15	Rapid	1–0	BW Linz	Vienna
17:00	Grüll 60'	Report		Stadium: Allianz Stadion; Attendance: 17,500; Referee: Christian-Petru Ciochirca

5 December 2023 16	Wattens	1–2	Rapid	Innsbruck
19:00	Moormann 90+1' (o.g.)	Report	50' Seidl; 74' Grüll; (red card) 87' Kongolo	Stadium: Tivoli Stadion Tirol; Attendance: 900; Referee: Florian Jäger

9 December 2023 17	Rapid	0–1	Red Bull	Vienna
14:30		Report	19' Piątkowski	Stadium: Allianz Stadion; Attendance: 20,400; Referee: Walter Altmann

11 February 2024 18	Wolfsberg	0–2	Rapid	Wolfsberg
14:30		Report	12' (pen.) Grüll; 75' Mayulu	Stadium: Lavanttal-Arena; Attendance: 3,994; Referee: Christian-Petru Ciochirca

18 February 2024 19	Sturm	1–1	Rapid	Graz
17:00	Lavalée 6'	Report	41' Lang	Stadium: Merkur Arena; Attendance: 15,500; Referee: Walter Altmann

25 February 2024 20	Rapid	3–0	Austria Wien	Vienna
17:00	Seidl 18'; Burgstaller 20'; Grüll 40'	Report		Stadium: Allianz Stadion; Attendance: 26,000; Referee: Sebastian Gishamer

3 March 2024 21	Rapid	1–1	Lustenau	Vienna
17:00	Kongolo (yellow card) (red card) 34'; Grüll 78' (pen.)	Report	50' Bobzien	Stadium: Allianz Stadion; Attendance: 18,700; Referee: Markus Hameter

10 March 2024 22	Klagenfurt	1–1	Rapid	Klagenfurt
17:00	Wernitznig 73'	Report	39' Lang	Stadium: 28 Black Arena; Referee: Stefan Ebner

==== Championship round ====
===== Table =====
Pos	Team	Pld	W	D	L	GF	GA	GD	Pts	Qualification	STU	RBS	LASK	RWI	HAR	AKL
2	Red Bull Salzburg	32	20	7	5	74	29	+45	42	Qualification for the Champions League third qualifying round (Note: Since the Europa League winners, Atalanta qualified for the Champions League via league position, Red Bull Salzburg were promoted from the Champions League second qualifying round to the third qualifying round as one of the two teams with the highest coefficient in the second qualifying round.)	2–2	—	7–1	1–1	5–1	4–2
3	LASK	32	14	10	8	43	33	+10	34	Qualification for the Europa League play-off round (Note: The 2023–24 Austrian Cup winners qualified for the Europa League play-off round. Since the cup winners (Sturm Graz) qualified based on league position, the Europa League spot was passed to the third-placed team.)	2–2	3–1	—	5–0	1–3	1–0
4	Rapid Wien	32	11	12	9	47	35	+12	28	Qualification for the Europa League second qualifying round	1–3	2–0	0–0	—	0–3	1–1
5	Hartberg	32	12	9	11	49	52	−3	28	Qualification for the Conference League play-offs	1–3	1–5	1–2	0–3	—	3–2
6	Austria Klagenfurt	32	9	12	11	40	50	−10	22		0–4	4–3	0–2	0–1	2–2	—

Source: Austrian Football Bundesliga
Legend: Blue = home team win; Yellow = draw; Red = away team win.
Rules for classification: 1) Points; 2) Points with (possible) half points subtracted due to rounding; 3) Head-to-head points; 4) Head-to-head goal difference; 5) Head-to-head goals scored; 6) Goal difference; 7) Goals scored; 8) Matches won; 9) Away matches won; 10) Away goals scored.

===== Matches =====
15 March 2024 23	Rapid	0–0	LASK	Vienna
19:30		Report		Stadium: Allianz Stadion; Attendance: 13,400; Referee: Alexander Harkam

31 March 2024 24	Hartberg	0–3	Rapid	Hartberg
14:30	Avdijaj (yellow card) (red card) 88'	Report	3' 43' 80' Grüll	Stadium: Profertil Arena; Referee: Christopher Jäger

7 April 2024 25	Red Bull	1–1	Rapid	Wals-Siezenheim
17:00	Konaté 87'	Report	90+6' (pen.) Grüll	Stadium: Red Bull Arena; Attendance: 15,000; Referee: Alan Kijas

14 April 2024 26	Rapid	1–1	Klagenfurt	Vienna
17:00	Jansson 5'	Report	55' Besuschkow	Stadium: Allianz Stadion; Attendance: 19,600; Referee: Christian-Petru Ciochirca

19 April 2024 27	Sturm	1–0	Rapid	Graz
19:30	Biereth 79'	Report		Stadium: Merkur Arena; Referee: Markus Hameter

24 April 2024 28	Rapid	1–3	Sturm	Vienna
20:30	Mayulu 19'	Report	8' Horvat; 29' Gazibegović; 44' Kiteishvili	Stadium: Allianz Stadion; Attendance: 20,300; Referee: Walter Altmann

28 April 2024 29	LASK	5–0	Rapid	Linz
14:30	Ljubičić 31' (pen.) 61'; Flecker 36'; Taoui 38'; Horvath 56'	Report		Stadium: Raiffeisen Arena; Attendance: 17,000; Referee: Christopher Jäger

5 May 2024 30	Rapid	2–0	Red Bull	Vienna
17:00	Grüll 51' (pen.); Burgstaller 73'	Report		Stadium: Allianz Stadion; Attendance: 18,100; Referee: Christian-Petru Ciochirca

12 May 2024 31	Klagenfurt	0–1	Rapid	Klagenfurt
17:00		Report	46' Mayulu	Stadium: 28 Black Arena; Referee: Stefan Ebner

19 May 2024 32	Rapid	0–3	Hartberg	Vienna
17:00		Report	25' Avdijaj; 59' Kainz; 90+2' Frieser	Stadium: Allianz Stadion; Attendance: 21,200; Referee: Markus Hameter

=== Austrian Cup ===
23 July 2023 1st round	SR Donaufeld	0–7	Rapid	Vienna, Austria
17:45		Report	6' Burgstaller; 45+1' 73' Grüll; 80' Mayulu; 85' Strunz; 88' Kerschbaum; 90+1' Seidl	Stadium: Sportclub-Platz; Attendance: 4,300; Referee: Safak Barmaksiz

27 September 2023 2nd round	Union Gurten	2–5 (a.e.t.)	Rapid	Ried im Innkreis, Austria
20:30	Kreuzer 37'; Wimmleitner 76'	Report	18' (pen.) Strunz; 82' Seidl; 96' (pen.) Grüll; 102' 108' Mayulu	Stadium: Klaus-Roitinger-Stadion; Attendance: 5,000; Referee: Oliver Fluch

1 November 2023 Round of 16	SKU Amstetten	1–5	Rapid	Amstetten, Austria
20:30	Starkl 64' (Monsberger); Yilmaz (yellow card) 73'	Report	Grüll 30' (pen.) 57' (Kühn); Kühn 39' (Grüll); Kerschbaum 54' (Moormann) (yellow card) 70'; Moormann (yellow card) 81'; Mayulu 85' (Kerschbaum)	Stadium: Ertl Glas Stadion; Attendance: 2,630; Referee: Alexander Harkam

4 February 2024 Quarterfinal	Rapid	3–1	SKN St. Pölten	Vienna, Austria
18:10	Grüll 35' (pen.); Ramsebner 77' (o.g.); Seidl 90+3'	Report	11' (pen.) Nutz	Stadium: Allianz Stadion; Attendance: 15,200; Referee: Alexander Harkam

3 April 2024 Semifinal	DSV Leoben	0–3	Rapid	Leoben, Austria
20:45		Report	27' (o.g.) Halili; 42' Lang; 90+2' Mayulu	Stadium: Monte Schlacko Arena; Attendance: 8,450; Referee: Markus Hameter

1 May 2024 Final	Sturm Graz	1–2	Rapid	Klagenfurt, Austria
17:00	Querfeld 50' (o.g.); Horvat 81'	Report	43' Seidl	Stadium: Wörthersee Stadion; Attendance: 30,000; Referee: Sebastian Gishamer

=== UEFA Europa Conference League ===
==== Third qualifying round ====
10 August 2023 First leg	Rapid (Austria)	0–0	(Hungary) Debreceni VSC	Vienna, Austria
21:00		Report		Stadium: Weststadion; Attendance: 17,200; Referee: Rob Hennessy (Republic of Ireland)

17 August 2023 Second leg	Debreceni VSC (Hungary)	0–5 (0–5 agg.)	(Austria) Rapid	Debrecen, Hungary
21:00		Report	15' Seidl; 43' (o.g.) Romanchuk; 52' Grüll; 72' Burgstaller; 90' Bajic	Stadium: Nagyerdei Stadion; Attendance: 16,572; Referee: Aleksandar Stavrev (North Macedonia)

==== Play-off round ====
24 August 2023 First leg	Rapid (Austria)	1–0	(Italy) ACF Fiorentina	Vienna, Austria
19:00	Grüll 35' (pen.)	Report		Stadium: Weststadion; Attendance: 23,000; Referee: Igor Pajic (Croatia)

31 August 2023 Second leg	ACF Fiorentina (Italy)	2–0 (2–1 agg.)	(Austria) Rapid	Florence, Italy
20:00	González 59' 90' (pen.)	Report		Stadium: Stadio Artemio Franchi; Attendance: 24,135; Referee: Novak Simović (Serbia)
