= 2022–23 SK Rapid Wien season =

Rapid Wien
2022–23 season
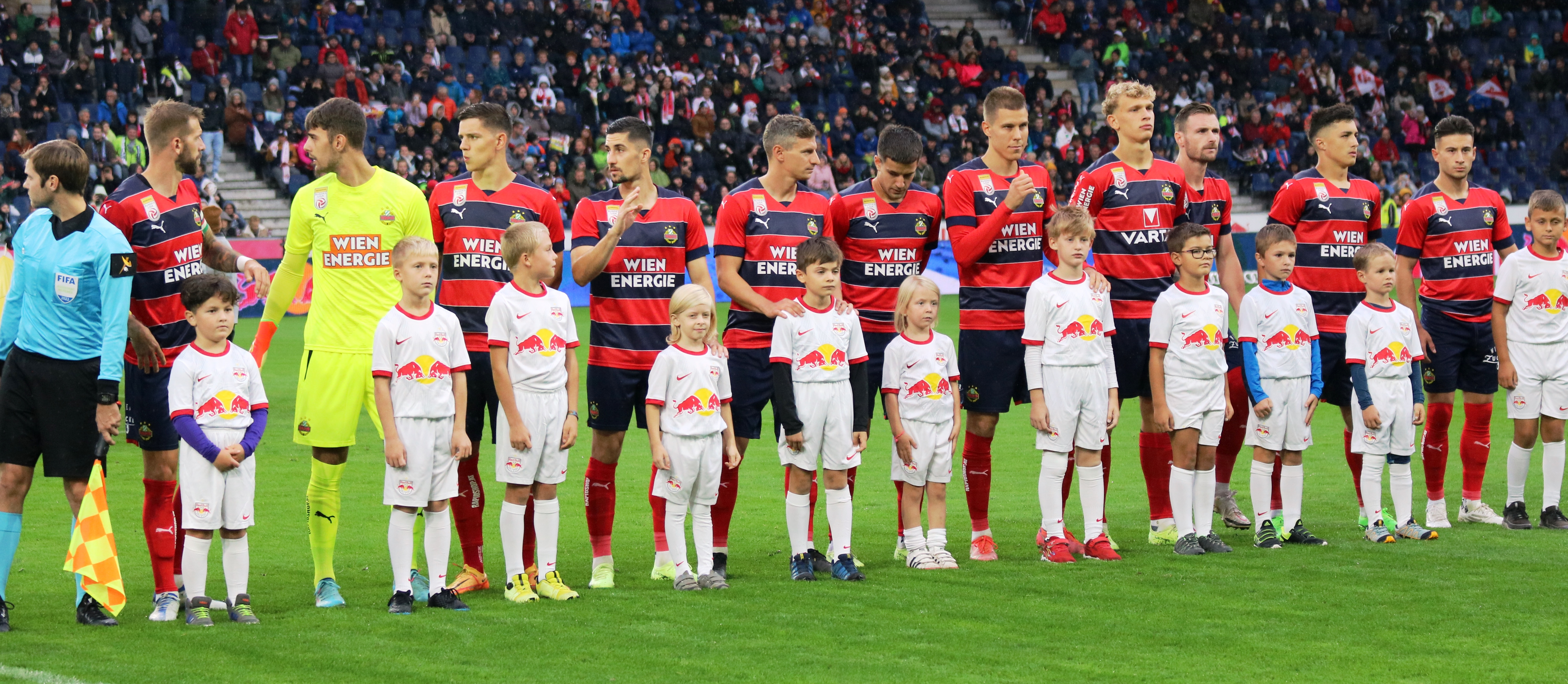
- Chairman: Martin Bruckner (until 26 November); Alexander Wrabetz
- Head coach: Ferdinand Feldhofer (until 15 October); Zoran Barisic
- Stadium: Allianz Stadion
- Austrian Football Bundesliga: 4th (championship round); 4th (regular season)
- Austrian Cup: Runner-up
- Conference League: Play-off round
- Top goalscorer: League: Guido Burgstaller (21 goals); All: Guido Burgstaller (25 goals)
- Highest home attendance: 26,000 vs. FK Austria Wien, 9 October 2022, 16 April 2023
- Lowest home attendance: 12,800 vs. Austria Klagenfurt, 9 April 2023
- Average home league attendance: 18,100
Home colours	Away colours
- All statistics correct as of 3 June 2023.

The 2022–23 season is the 125th season in the existence of SK Rapid Wien and the club's 74th consecutive season in the top flight of Austrian football. In addition to the domestic league, Rapid Wien will participate in this season's edition of the Austrian Cup and enters international football in the second qualifying round to the UEFA Europa Conference League having won the previous Bundesliga seasons ECL play-offs.

== Squad ==
=== Squad statistics ===
No.	Nat.	Name	Age	League		Austrian Cup		UEFA Competitions		Total		Discipline		
No.	Nat.	Name	Age	Apps	Goals	Apps	Goals	Apps	Goals	Apps	Goals	Yellow card	(yellow card) (red card)	Red card
Goalkeepers
21	(Austria)	Bernhard Unger	23											
25	(Austria)	Paul Gartler	25	1		1				2		1		
45	(Austria)	Niklas Hedl	21	31		5		6		42				
Defenders
2	(Netherlands)	Denso Kasius	19	8+2		1+1				9+3		2		1
4	(Austria)	Emanuel Aiwu	21			1		2		3				
6	(Austria)	Kevin Wimmer	29	8+2		4	1	6		18+2	1	5		1
17	(Austria)	Christopher Dibon	31	2		0+1				2+1				
19	(Austria)	Michael Sollbauer	32	24		5	1	1		30	1	3		1
20	(Austria)	Maximilian Hofmann	28	4+2		1		3+1		8+3		4		
22	(Slovakia)	Martin Koscelník	27	14+4		1+2		4+1		19+7		4		
23	(Austria)	Jonas Auer	21	25+3		4+1		3+2		32+6		8		
26	(Austria)	Martin Moormann	21	14+7		3		1+1		18+8		2		1
43	(Austria)	Leopold Querfeld	18	21+2	1	1+1		0+1		22+4	1	2		1
Midfielders
5	(Austria)	Roman Kerschbaum	28	23+5	2	4+1	1	1+2		28+8	3	9		
7	(Germany)	Nicolas Kühn	22	12+8	3	3		4+2	1	19+10	4	2		
8	(Austria)	Christoph Knasmüllner	30	7+5		2+2		0+1		9+8		1		
13	(Austria)	Thorsten Schick	32	13+12		3+2		4+2		20+16		11		
14	(Serbia)	Aleksa Pejić	22	24+2		5		4+1		33+3		15		
16	(Slovenia)	Dejan Petrovič	24	2+2						2+2		1		
24	(Austria)	Patrick Greil	25	17+11	1	4+2		3+1		24+14	1	3		
28	(Austria)	Moritz Oswald	20	7+5		1+2		3+1		11+8		3		
34	(Austria)	Nikolas Sattlberger	18	2+1				1+2		3+3		1		
Forwards
9	(Austria)	Guido Burgstaller	33	27+4	21	6	3	6	1	39+4	25	6		
10	(Austria)	Yusuf Demir	19	1	1	1		1+2		3+2	1	1		
18	(Austria)	Oliver Strunz	22	7+7	4	1+2				8+9	4	4		
27	(Austria)	Marco Grüll	24	25+5	6	5+1	1	6	2	36+6	9	8		
29	(Austria)	Ante Bajic	26	11+13	1	3+2	2	3+1		17+16	3	4	1	
38	(Netherlands)	Ferdy Druijf	24	11+12	3	0+4	2	1+2	2	12+18	7	3		
39	(Austria)	René Kriwak	23	2+1		1		0+2		3+3				
41	(Austria)	Bernhard Zimmermann	20	8+17	7	0+5	1	3+1		11+23	8	4		
77	(Serbia)	Dragoljub Savić	21	1+1				0+2		1+3				

=== Goal scorers ===
Name	Bundesliga	Cup	International	Total
(Austria) Guido Burgstaller	21	3	1	25
(Austria) Marco Grüll	6	1	2	9
(Austria) Bernhard Zimmermann	7	1		8
(Netherlands) Ferdy Druijf	3	2	2	7
(Germany) Nicolas Kühn	3		1	4
(Austria) Oliver Strunz	4			4
(Austria) Ante Bajic	1	2		3
(Austria) Roman Kerschbaum	2	1		3
(Austria) Yusuf Demir	1			1
(Austria) Patrick Greil	1			1
(Austria) Leopold Querfeld	1			1
(Austria) Michael Sollbauer		1		1
(Austria) Kevin Wimmer		1		1
Totals	50	12	6	68

=== Disciplinary record ===
Name	Bundesliga			Cup			International			Total		
Name	Yellow card	(yellow card) (red card)	Red card	Yellow card	(yellow card) (red card)	Red card	Yellow card	(yellow card) (red card)	Red card	Yellow card	(yellow card) (red card)	Red card
(Serbia) Aleksa Pejić	8			3			4			15		
(Austria) Thorsten Schick	7			1			3			11		
(Austria) Roman Kerschbaum	8						1			9		
(Austria) Jonas Auer	7			1						8		
(Austria) Marco Grüll	6						2			8		
(Austria) Kevin Wimmer	4			1					1	5		1
(Austria) Guido Burgstaller	6									6		
(Austria) Ante Bajic	4	1								4	1	
(Austria) Michael Sollbauer	2		1	1						3		1
(Austria) Maximilian Hofmann	2			1			1			4		
(Slovakia) Martin Koscelník	2						2			4		
(Austria) Oliver Strunz	3			1						4		
(Austria) Bernhard Zimmermann	4									4		
(Netherlands) Denso Kasius	2		1							2		1
(Austria) Martin Moormann	2		1							2		1
(Austria) Leopold Querfeld			1	1			1			2		1
(Netherlands) Ferdy Druijf	2			1						3		
(Austria) Patrick Greil	2			1						3		
(Austria) Moritz Oswald	2						1			3		
(Germany) Nicolas Kühn	1						1			2		
(Austria) Yusuf Demir							1			1		
(Austria) Paul Gartler	1									1		
(Austria) Christoph Knasmüllner	1									1		
(Slovenia) Dejan Petrovič	1									1		
(Austria) Nikolas Sattlberger							1			1		
Totals	77	1	4	12			18		1	107	1	5

=== Transfers ===
==== In ====
Pos.	Nat.	Name	Age	Moved from	Type	Transfer Window	Ref.
MF	(Austria)	Roman Kerschbaum	28	(Austria) FC Admira Wacker Mödling	Free transfer	Summer	
MF	(Austria)	Patrick Greil	25	SK Austria Klagenfurt	Free Transfer	Summer	
MF	(Germany)	Nicolas-Gerrit Kühn	22	(Germany) FC Bayern Munich II	Transfer	Summer	
MF	(Serbia)	Aleksa Pejić	22	(Belarus) FC Shakhtyor Soligorsk	Transfer	Summer	
DF	(Austria)	Michael Sollbauer	32	(Germany) Dynamo Dresden	Free transfer	Summer	
MF	(Austria)	Ante Bajic	26	(Austria) SV Ried	Transfer	Summer	
FW	(Austria)	Guido Burgstaller	33	(Germany) FC St. Pauli	Transfer	Summer	
DF	(Slovakia)	Martin Koscelník	27	(Slovakia) FC Slovan Liberec	Transfer	Summer	
DF	(Netherlands)	Denso Kasius	20	(Italy) Bologna F.C. 1909	Loan	Winter	

==== Out ====
Pos.	Nat.	Name	Age	Moved to	Type	Transfer Window	Ref.
DF	(Austria)	Leo Greiml	20	(Germany) FC Schalke 04	Free transfer	Summer	
MF	(Austria)	Kelvin Arase	23	(Germany) Karlsruher SC	Free transfer	Summer	
MF	(Austria)	Philipp Schobesberger	28	(Austria) SKU Amstetten	Free agent	Summer	
MF	(Bosnia and Herzegovina)	Srđan Grahovac	29	(Turkey) Çaykur Rizespor	Free transfer	Summer	
MF	(Austria)	Dalibor Velimirovic	21	(Austria) First Vienna FC	Free transfer	Summer	
MF	(Austria)	Robert Ljubičić	22	(Croatia) GNK Dinamo Zagreb	Transfer	Summer	
FW	(Japan)	Koya Kitagawa	25	(Japan) Shimizu S-Pulse	Transfer	Summer	
MF	(Austria)	Benjamin Kanuric	19	(Germany) Arminia Bielefeld	Transfer	Summer	
DF	(Austria)	Emanuel Aiwu	21	(Italy) U.S. Cremonese	Transfer	Summer	
DF	(Austria)	Lukas Sulzbacher	22	(Austria) WSG Tirol	Transfer	Summer	
FW	(Austria)	René Kriwak	23	(Austria) TSV Hartberg	Loan	Summer	
FW	(Austria)	Yusuf Demir	19	(Turkey) Galatasaray S.K.	Transfer	Summer	

== Pre-season and friendlies ==
Win Draw Loss Fixtures

25 June 2022 Friendly	SC Neusiedl/See	1–3	Rapid Wien	Lackenbach, Austria
	Vlna 65'		67' 70' Kriwak; 81' Sattlberger	Stadium: Sportplatz Lackenbach; Attendance: 700

29 June 2022 Friendly	SV Lafnitz	2–5	Rapid Wien	Bad Tatzmannsdorf, Austria
	Lichtenberger 49'; Neubauer 80'		30' Kühn; 38' Grüll; 74' 88' Zimmermann; 90+3' Savić	Stadium: Sportplatz Bad Tatzmannsdorf; Attendance: –

2 July 2022 Friendly	AEK Larnaca FC	3–2	Rapid Wien	Oberwart, Austria
	Olatunji 41'; Sanjurjo 73'; Romo 86'		68' Savić; 77' Kriwak	Stadium: Inform-Stadion; Attendance: 500

9 July 2022 Friendly	Rapid Wien	3–3	Celtic F.C.	Vienna, Austria
18:00	Zimmermann 29'; Kriwak 62'; Aiwu 90'		9' O'Riley; 56' Turnbull; 65' Furuhashi	Stadium: Allianz Stadion; Attendance: 9,400

16 July 2022 Friendly	Admira Wacker	1–2	Rapid Wien	Maria Enzersdorf, Austria
	Gattermayer 50'		36' (pen.) Knasmüllner; 88' Demir	Stadium: Bundesstadion Südstadt

25 November 2022 Friendly	Rapid Wien	2–2	Floridsdorfer AC	Vienna, Austria
15:00	Knasmüllner 55'; Tambwe-Kasengele 79'	Report	25' Alberico; 52' Kröhn	Stadium: West 1

2 December 2022 Friendly	Rapid Wien	4–1	First Vienna FC	Vienna, Austria
15:00	Zimmermann 36'; Kühn 45'; Querfeld 66'; Dibon 80'	Report	4' Tanzmayr	Stadium: Allianz Stadion; Attendance: 750

9 December 2022 Friendly	Rapid Wien	2–2	FC Schalke 04	Vienna, Austria
15:00	Knasmüllner 49'; Kerschbaum 62' (pen.)	Report	8' Kozuki; 31' Terodde	Stadium: Allianz Stadion; Attendance: 9,100

11 January 2023 Friendly	Rapid Wien	6–0	SR Donaufeld	Vienna, Austria
17:30	Bajic 11'; Strunz 13'; Burgstaller 33' 39'; Druijf 71'; Schuster 75'			Stadium: Trainingsplatz 1

16 January 2023 Friendly	Śląsk Wrocław	3–2	Rapid Wien	Belek, Turkey
	Quintana 8'; Nahuel 25'; Bergier 63' (pen.)		44' Burgstaller; 45' Querfeld	Stadium: Kaya Palazzo

20 January 2023 Friendly	FK Teplice	1–3	Rapid Wien	Belek, Turkey
	Gning 81'		5' Strunz; 78' Zimmermann; 87' Oswald

24 January 2023 Friendly	Dynamo Kyiv	0–4	Rapid Wien	Antalya, Turkey
			18' (o.g.) Zabarnyi; 32' 48' Burgstaller; 80' Knasmüllner	Stadium: Mardan Sports Complex

24 March 2023 Friendly	FC Mistelbach	0–7	Rapid Wien	Mistelbach, Austria
			21' Koscelník; 33' Grüll; 47' Schick; 50' Dijakovic; 55' Bajic; 74' Bajlicz; 80' Knasmüllner

== Competitions ==
=== Overall record ===
Competition	First match	Last match	Starting round	Final position	Record							
Competition	First match	Last match	Starting round	Final position	Pld	W	D	L	GF	GA	GD	Win %
Austrian Football Bundesliga	24 July 2022	3 June 2023		4th	32	12	6	14	50	47	+3	37.50
Austrian Cup	15 July 2022	30 April 2023	Round 1	Runner-up	6	5	0	1	12	5	+7	83.33
Conference League	21 July 2022	25 August 2022	Second qualifying round	Play-off round	6	2	2	2	6	6	+0	33.33
Total					44	19	8	17	68	58	+10	43.18

Last updated: 3 June 2023
Source: Soccerway

=== Austrian Football Bundesliga ===
==== Results summary ====
Overall								Home						Away					
Pld	W	D	L	GF	GA	GD	Pts	W	D	L	GF	GA	GD	W	D	L	GF	GA	GD
32	12	6	14	50	47	+3	42	7	4	5	29	22	+7	5	2	9	21	25	−4

Last updated: 3 June 2023.
Source: Austrian Football Bundesliga

==== Results by round ====
Round	1	2	3	4	5	6	7	8	9	10	11	12	13	14	15	16	17	18	19	20	21	22	23	24	25	26	27	28	29	30	31	32
Ground	H	A	H	A	H	H	A	H	A	A	H	A	H	A	H	A	A	H	A	H	H	A	A	H	H	A	H	A	A	H	H	A
Result	W	W	D	L	W	L	W	L	D	W	L	L	L	D	W	W	L	W	W	L	W	L	L	W	D	L	D	L	L	D	W	L
Position	5	1	2	5	3	4	3	4	4	4	4	4	5	7	4	4	5	4	4	4	4	4	5	4	4	4	4	4	5	5	4	4

Updated to match(es) played on 3 June 2023. Source: Austrian Football Bundesliga
A = Away; H = Home; W = Win; D = Draw; L = Loss

==== Regular season ====
===== Table =====
Pos	Team	Pld	W	D	L	GF	GA	GD	Pts	Qualification
2	Sturm Graz	22	14	6	2	37	15	+22	48	Qualification for the Championship round
3	LASK	22	10	8	4	38	28	+10	38	Qualification for the Championship round
4	Rapid Wien	22	10	3	9	34	26	+8	33	Qualification for the Championship round
5	Austria Wien	22	10	5	7	37	31	+6	32 (Note: Austria Wien were deducted 3 points due to license violation.)	Qualification for the Championship round
6	Austria Klagenfurt	22	9	3	10	35	40	−5	30	Qualification for the Championship round

Source: Austrian Football Bundesliga
Rules for classification: 1) Points; 2) Head-to-head record; 3) Goal difference; 4) Goals scored; 5) Matches won; 6) Away matches won; 7) Away goals scored.

===== Matches =====
24 July 2022 1	Rapid	1–0	Ried	Vienna
17:00	Zimmermann 77'	Report		Stadium: Allianz Stadion; Attendance: 13,800; Referee: Walter Altmann

31 July 2022 2	Klagenfurt	0–1	Rapid	Klagenfurt
17:00		Report	67' (pen.) Burgstaller	Stadium: Wörthersee Stadion; Attendance: 5,900; Referee: Manuel Schüttengruber

7 August 2022 3	Rapid	1–1	Lustenau	Vienna
17:00	Burgstaller 21'; Bajic (yellow card) (red card) 58'	Report	70' Surdanovic	Stadium: Allianz Stadion; Attendance: 17,600; Referee: Stefan Ebner

14 August 2022 4	LASK	2–1	Rapid	Pasching
17:00	Goiginger 10'; Nakamura 43'	Report	90+3' Grüll	Stadium: Waldstadion; Attendance: 6,009; Referee: Sebastian Gishamer

26 October 2022 5	Rapid	5–1	Hartberg	Vienna
16:00	Burgstaller 26' 52' 71'; Grüll 68'; Druijf (penalty missed); Kühn 90+2'		44' Aydin	Stadium: Allianz Stadion; Attendance: 14,400; Referee: Walter Altmann

28 August 2022 6	Rapid	1–2	Sturm	Vienna
17:00	Kühn 15'; Moormann (red card) 84'	Report	25' Wüthrich; 86' (pen.) Horvat	Stadium: Allianz Stadion; Attendance: 19,200; Referee: Christopher Jäger

4 September 2022 7	Altach	0–1	Rapid	Altach
14:30		Report	9' Demir	Stadium: Stadion Schnabelholz; Attendance: 5,400; Referee: Christian-Petru Ciochirca

10 September 2022 8	Rapid	1–3	Wolfsberg	Vienna
17:00	Zimmermann 90+1'	Report	11' (pen.) Baribo; 14' 65' Malone	Stadium: Allianz Stadion; Attendance: 13,400; Referee: Sebastian Gishamer

18 September 2022 9	Red Bull	1–1	Rapid	Wals-Siezenheim
17:00	Šeško 1'	Report	21' Querfeld	Stadium: Red Bull Arena; Attendance: 15,785; Referee: Alexander Harkam

1 October 2022 10	Wattens	0–5	Rapid	Innsbruck
17:00		Report	45' 57' (pen.) Burgstaller; 51' Grüll; 78' Druijf; 81' Zimmermann	Stadium: Tivoli; Attendance: 2,570; Referee: Alan Kijas

9 October 2022 11	Rapid	1–2	Austria	Vienna
17:00	Bajic 90+1'	Report	4' Huskovic; 17' (pen.) Fitz	Stadium: Allianz Stadion; Attendance: 26,000; Referee: Manuel Schüttengruber

15 October 2022 12	Ried	1–0	Rapid	Ried im Innkreis
17:00	Monschein 50' (pen.)	Report	(red card) 87' Querfeld	Stadium: Josko Arena; Attendance: 5,800; Referee: Alexander Harkam

22 October 2022 13	Rapid	0–1	Klagenfurt	Vienna
17:00		Report	6' Pink	Stadium: Allianz Stadion; Attendance: 14,800; Referee: Dieter Muckenhammer

29 October 2022 14	Lustenau	3–3	Rapid	Lustenau
17:00	Surdanovic 36'; Teixeira 66' 90+5' (pen.)	Report	59' 90+2' Burgstaller; 90+10' Zimmermann	Stadium: Reichshofstadion; Attendance: 4,500; Referee: Christian-Petru Ciochirca

6 November 2022 15	Rapid	1–0	LASK	Vienna
17:00	Burgstaller 40'	Report		Stadium: Allianz Stadion; Attendance: 18,200; Referee: Alan Kijas

12 November 2022 16	Hartberg	1–2	Rapid	Hartberg
17:00	Aydin 44'	Report	16' Grüll; 88' Zimmermann	Stadium: Profertil Arena; Attendance: 4,705; Referee: Stefan Ebner

10 February 2023 17	Sturm	1–0	Rapid	Graz
20:30	Affengruber 90+1'	Report		Stadium: Liebenauer Stadium; Attendance: 15,500; Referee: Walter Altmann

19 February 2023 18	Rapid	3–0	Altach	Vienna
17:00	Strunz 53' 81'; Burgstaller 85'	Report		Stadium: Allianz Stadion; Attendance: 13,700; Referee: Andreas Heiß

26 February 2023 19	Wolfsberg	1–2	Rapid	Wolfsberg
14:30	Baribo 53'	Report	24' Greil; 43' Zimmermann	Stadium: Lavanttal-Arena; Referee: Manuel Schüttengruber

5 March 2023 20	Rapid	2–4	Red Bull	Vienna
17:00	Zimmermann 44'; Burgstaller 90+5'	Report	4' Seiwald; 80' 84' 87' Šeško	Stadium: Allianz Stadion; Attendance: 24,200; Referee: Dieter Muckenhammer

12 March 2023 21	Rapid	2–0	Wattens	Vienna
17:00	Strunz 74'; Burgstaller 86'	Report		Stadium: Allianz Stadion; Attendance: 19,400; Referee: Markus Hameter

19 March 2023 22	Austria	2–0	Rapid	Vienna
17:00	Tabakovic 40'; Leidner 53'	Report		Stadium: Franz Horr Stadium; Attendance: 15,200; Referee: Julian Weinberger

==== Championship round ====
===== Table =====
Pos	Team	Pld	W	D	L	GF	GA	GD	Pts	Qualification	RBS	STU	LIN	RWI	AWI	KLA
2	Sturm Graz	32	20	6	6	57	29	+28	42	Qualification for the Champions League third qualifying round	0–2	—	2–0	3–1	3–2	4–1
3	LASK	32	14	12	6	54	38	+16	35	Qualification for the Europa League play-off round	0–1	2–1	—	3–1	3–1	4–0
4	Rapid Wien	32	12	6	14	50	47	+3	25	Qualification for the Europa Conference League third qualifying round	1–1	3–2	1–1	—	3–3	3–1
5	Austria Wien (O)	32	11	10	11	55	52	+3	24	Qualification for the Europa Conference League play-offs	1–1	1–2	2–2	3–1	—	1–2
6	Austria Klagenfurt	32	11	5	16	45	63	−18	23		0–3	0–2	1–1	2–1	1–1	—

Source: Austrian Football Bundesliga
Legend: Blue = home team win; Yellow = draw; Red = away team win.
Rules for classification: 1) Points; 2) Points with (possible) half points subtracted due to rounding; 3) Head-to-head points; 4) Head-to-head goal difference; 5) Head-to-head goals scored; 6) Head-to-head away goals scored; 7) Goal difference; 8) Goals scored; 9) Matches won; 10) Away matches won; 11) Away goals scored.
(O) Play-off winners

===== Matches =====
2 April 2022 23	Sturm	3–1	Rapid	Graz
17:30	Emegha 6'; Sarkaria 45+1'; Kiteishvili 70'		17' Burgstaller	Stadium: Liebenauer Stadium; Attendance: 15,432; Referee: Stefan Ebner

9 April 2022 24	Rapid	3–1	Klagenfurt	Vienna
14:30	Burgstaller 4'; Strunz 70'; Kühn 90+4'	Report	59' Soto; (red card) 90+2' Cvetko	Stadium: Allianz Stadion; Attendance: 12,800; Referee: Manuel Schüttengruber

16 April 2022 25	Rapid	3–3	Austria	Vienna
17:00	Burgstaller 15'; Kerschbaum 43'; Kasius (red card) 47'; Grüll 84'	Report	28' Gruber; 32' 78' (yellow card) (red card) 86' Tabaković	Stadium: Allianz Stadion; Attendance: 26,000; Referee: Sebastian Gishammer

23 April 2022 26	LASK	3–1	Rapid	Linz
14:30	Žulj 10' 34'; Stojković 81'		53' Druijf	Stadium: Raiffeisen Arena (Linz); Attendance: 17,650; Referee: Alan Kiljas

26 April 2022 27	Rapid	1–1	Red Bull	Vienna
20:30	Burgstaller 44'; Sollbauer (red card) 82'	Report	15' Konaté	Stadium: Allianz Stadion; Attendance: 14,600; Referee: Walter Altmann

7 May 2022 28	Red Bull	2–1	Rapid	Wals-Siezenheim
17:00	Koïta 19' 62'	Report	70' (pen.) Burgstaller	Stadium: Red Bull Arena; Attendance: 15,965; Referee: Manuel Schüttengruber

14 May 2022 29	Austria	3–1	Rapid	Vienna
17:00	Tabaković 23' 27' 90+6'	Report	36' Burgstaller	Stadium: Franz Horr Stadium; Attendance: 14,700; Referee: Alexander Harkam

21 May 2022 30	Rapid	1–1	LASK	Vienna
14:30	Burgstaller 2' (penalty missed)	Report	85' Goiginger	Stadium: Allianz Stadion; Attendance: 18,900; Referee: Markus Hameter

28 May 2022 31	Rapid	3–2	Sturm	Vienna
17:00	Burgstaller 40'; Kerschbaum 45+4'; Grüll 66'	Report	10' Sarkaria; 33' Kiteishvili	Stadium: Allianz Stadion; Attendance: 22,300; Referee: Stefan Ebner

3 June 2022 32	Klagenfurt	2–1	Rapid	Klagenfurt
17:00	Karweina 59'; Sollbauer 72' (o.g.)	Report	70' Druijf	Stadium: Wörthersee Stadion; Attendance: 6,650; Referee: Sebastian Gishamer

=== Austrian Cup ===
15 July 2022 1st round	SK Treibach	0–1	Rapid Wien	Althofen
18:30		Report	90+6' Burgstaller	Stadium: Turnerwald-Stadion; Attendance: 1,250; Referee: Christian-Petru Ciochirca

1 September 2022 2nd round	SV Allerheiligen	0–2	Rapid Wien	Allerheiligen bei Wildon
17:30		Report	66' Druijf; 79' Wimmer	Stadium: Sportplatz USV Allerheiligen/Wildon; Attendance: 1,250; Referee: Alan Kiljas

18 October 2022 Round of 16	WSG Tirol	1–4	Rapid Wien	Wattens
18:00	Sabitzer 37' (penalty missed)	Report	6' Grüll; 74' Kerschbaum; 76' Druijf; 84' Zimmermann	Stadium: Gernot Langes Stadion; Attendance: 2,300; Referee: Sebastian Gishamer

3 February 2023 Quarterfinal	Wolfsberger AC	1–3 (a.e.t.)	Rapid Wien	Wolfsberg
18:00	Baribo 64'	Report	83' Sollbauer; 106' 108' Bajic	Stadium: Lavanttal-Arena; Attendance: 3,021; Referee: Stefan Ebner

5 April 2023 Semifinal	Rapid Wien	2–1	SV Ried	Vienna
20:30	Burgstaller 45+2' (Grüll) 83' (Greil)	Report	Ziegl	Stadium: Allianz Stadion; Attendance: 21,600; Referee: Alexander Harkam

30 April 2023 Final	Rapid Wien	0–2	SK Sturm Graz	Klagenfurt
20:30		Report	67' 87' Sarkaria	Stadium: Wörthersee Stadion; Attendance: 30,000; Referee: Christopher Jäger

=== UEFA Europa Conference League ===
==== Second qualifying round ====
21 July 2022 First leg	Rapid Wien (Austria)	0–0	(Poland) Lechia Gdańsk	Vienna, Austria
19:00		Report		Stadium: Weststadion; Attendance: 12,700; Referee: Elchin Masiyev (Azerbaijan)

28 July 2022 Second leg	Lechia Gdańsk (Poland)	1–2 (1–2 agg.)	(Austria) Rapid Wien	Gdańsk, Poland
19:45	Zwoliński 82'	Report	16' Kühn; 18' (pen.) Grüll	Stadium: Stadion Gdańsk; Attendance: 23,519; Referee: Alessandro Dudic (Switzerland)

==== Third qualifying round ====
4 August 2022 First leg	Neftçi PFK (Azerbaijan)	2–1	(Austria) Rapid Wien	Baku, Azerbaijan
21:00	Jaber 44'; Saief 60'	Report	90+5' Burgstaller	Stadium: Bakcell Arena; Attendance: 9,800; Referee: Dario Bel (Croatia)

11 August 2022 Second leg	Rapid Wien (Austria)	2–0 (a.e.t.) (3–2 agg.)	(Azerbaijan) Neftçi PFK	Vienna, Austria
20:30	Grüll 67'; Druijf 112'	Report		Stadium: Weststadion; Attendance: 14,600; Referee: Rohit Saggi (Norway)

==== Play-off round ====
18 August 2022 First leg	Vaduz (Liechtenstein)	1–1	(Austria) Rapid Wien	Rheinpark Stadion, Vaduz
20:00	Ulrich 10'	Report	53' Druijf	Attendance: 4,000; Referee: Kristo Tohver (Estonia)

25 August 2022 Second leg	Rapid Wien (Austria)	0–1 (1–2 agg.)	(Liechtenstein) Vaduz	Allianz Stadion, Vienna
21:00	Wimmer (red card) 35'	Report	22' Cicek	Attendance: 15,100; Referee: Rade Obrenovič (Slovenia)
