= Moritz Oswald =

Austrian association footballer

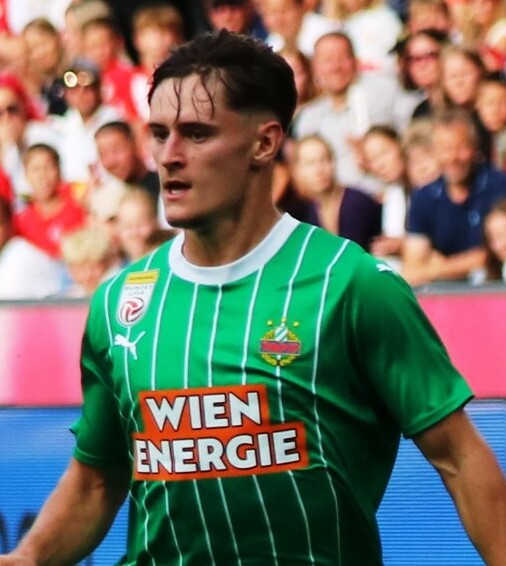
- Oswald in September 2023

Personal information
- Date of birth: 5 January 2002 (age 24)
- Place of birth: Austria
- Height: 1.71 m (5 ft 7 in)
- Position: Midfielder

Team information
- Current team: WSG Tirol (on loan from Rapid Wien)
- Number: 28

Youth career
- 2008–2010: SC Perchtoldsdorf
- 2010–2012: Admira
- 2012–2020: Rapid Wien

Senior career*
Years	Team	Apps	(Gls)
2020–2021	Rapid Wien II	22	(1)
2021–	Rapid Wien	70	(1)
2025–2026	→ Rheindorf Altach (loan)	18	(0)
2026–	→ WSG Tirol (loan)	2	(0)

International career^{‡}
2022–2024	Austria U21	19	(0)
- * Club domestic league appearances and goals as of 7 September 2026 ‡ National team caps and goals as of 9 September 2024

Moritz Oswald (born 5 January 2002) is an Austrian professional footballer who plays as a midfielder for WSG Tirol, on loan from Rapid Wien.

== Career ==
Oswald is a youth product of SC Perchtoldsdorf, and Rapid Wien. He began his professional career with their reserves in 2020, before debuting for their senior team in a 1–1 Austrian Football Bundesliga tie with Hartberg on 24 October 2021. On 8 February 2022, he signed a professional contract with the club until June 2025.

On 3 September 2025, Oswald was loaned by Rheindorf Altach.

On 24 August 2026, Oswald joined WSG Tirol on loan for the 2026–27 season.

== International career ==
Oswald was called up to the Austria U21s for 2023 UEFA European Under-21 Championship qualification matches in June 2022.

== Career statistics ==
As of 26 July 2026

Appearances and goals by club, season and competition
Club	Season	League			Cup		Continental		Other		Total	
Club	Season	Division	Apps	Goals	Apps	Goals	Apps	Goals	Apps	Goals	Apps	Goals
Rapid Wien II	2018–19	Austrian Regionalliga East	1	0	—		—		—		1	0
Rapid Wien II	2020–21	2. Liga	1	0	—		—		—		1	0
Rapid Wien II	2021–22	2. Liga	15	0	—		—		—		15	0
Rapid Wien II	2022–23	2. Liga	6	1	—		—		—		6	1
Rapid Wien II	Total		23	1	—		—		—		23	1
Rapid Wien	2021–22	Austrian Bundesliga	10	0	0	0	0	0	—		10	0
Rapid Wien	2022–23	Austrian Bundesliga	12	0	3	0	0	0	—		15	0
Rapid Wien	2023–24	Austrian Bundesliga	26	0	5	0	3 (Note: Appearances in UEFA Europa Conference League)	0	—		34	0
Rapid Wien	2024–25	Austrian Bundesliga	20	1	2	0	11 (Note: Six appearances in UEFA Europa League, five appearances in UEFA Conference League)	0	—		33	1
Rapid Wien	2026–27	Austrian Bundesliga	0	0	1	0	0	0	—		1	0
Rapid Wien	Total		68	1	11	0	14	0	0	0	93	1
Rheindorf Altach (loan)	2025–26	Austrian Bundesliga	18	0	2	1	—		—		20	1
Career total			109	1	13	1	14	0	0	0	136	2
