= Paul Gartler =

Austrian footballer

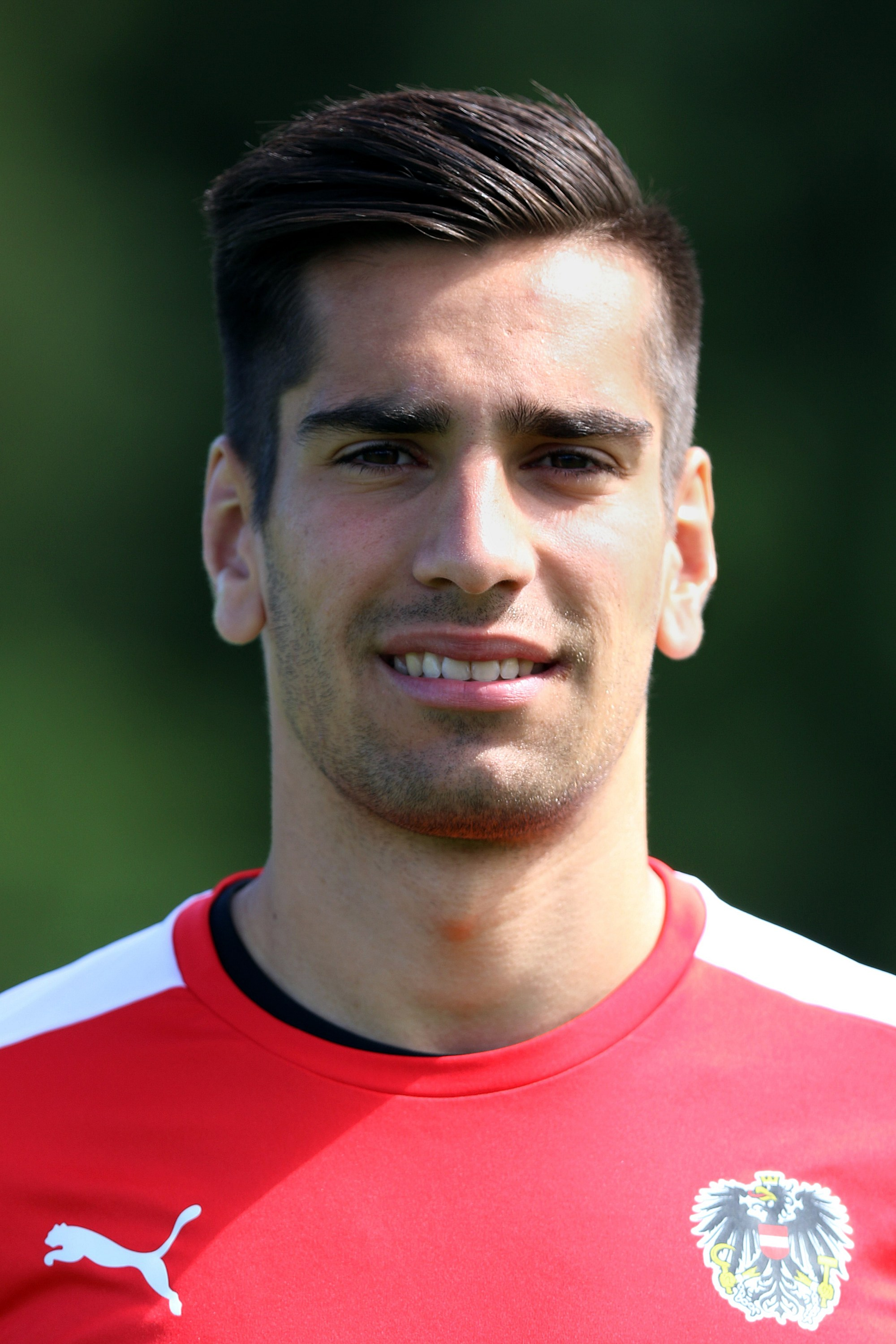
- Gartler with Austria U-21 in 2017

Personal information
- Date of birth: 9 March 1997 (age 29)
- Place of birth: Gleisdorf, Austria
- Height: 1.87 m (6 ft 1 1/2 in)
- Position: Goalkeeper

Team information
- Current team: Rapid Wien
- Number: 37

Youth career
- 2002–2009: SC Gleisdorf 1919
- 2009–2012: Sturm Graz
- 2012–2015: Rapid Wien

Senior career*
Years	Team	Apps	(Gls)
2013–2016	Rapid Wien II	49	(0)
2016–	Rapid Wien	38	(0)
2017–2018	→ Kapfenberger SV (loan)	47	(0)

International career^{‡}
2012–2013	Austria U-16	10	(0)
2013–2014	Austria U-17	11	(0)
2015	Austria U-18	4	(0)
2015–2016	Austria U-19	8	(0)
2017	Austria U-21	3	(0)
- * Club domestic league appearances and goals as of 6 December 2025 ‡ National team caps and goals as of 6 October 2017

Paul Gartler (born 9 March 1997) is an Austrian football player, who plays as a goalkeeper for Rapid Wien.

== Club career ==
He made his Austrian Football First League debut for Kapfenberger SV on 3 March 2017 in a game against Austria Lustenau.

== Career statistics ==
As of match played 5 September 2026

Appearances and goals by club, season and competition
Club	Season	League			Cup		Continental		Total	
Club	Season	Division	Apps	Goals	Apps	Goals	Apps	Goals	Apps	Goals
Rapid Wien II	2013–14	Austrian Regional League East	1	0	—		—		1	0
Rapid Wien II	2014–15	Austrian Regional League East	4	0	—		—		4	0
Rapid Wien II	2015–16	Austrian Regional League East	22	0	—		—		22	0
Rapid Wien II	2016–17	Austrian Regional League East	9	0	—		—		9	0
Rapid Wien II	2018–19	Austrian Regional League East	5	0	—		—		5	0
Rapid Wien II	2019–20	Austrian Regional League East	8	0	—		—		8	0
Rapid Wien II	Total		49	0	—		—		49	0
Rapid Wien	2016–17	Austrian Bundesliga	0	0	0	0	0	0	0	0
Rapid Wien	2019–20	Austrian Bundesliga	2	0	0	0	0	0	2	0
Rapid Wien	2020–21	Austrian Bundesliga	7	0	1	0	4 (Note: Appearances in UEFA Europa League)	0	12	0
Rapid Wien	2021–22	Austrian Bundesliga	19	0	3	0	7	0	29	0
Rapid Wien	2022–23	Austrian Bundesliga	1	0	1	0	1 (Note: Appearances in UEFA Conference League)	0	3	0
Rapid Wien	2023–24	Austrian Bundesliga	0	0	0	0	0	0	0	0
Rapid Wien	2024–25	Austrian Bundesliga	3	0	0	0	0	0	3	0
Rapid Wien	2025–26	Austrian Bundesliga	6	0	1	0	2	0	9	0
Rapid Wien	2026–27	Austrian Bundesliga	0	0	2	0	0	0	2	0
Rapid Wien	Total		38	0	8	0	14	0	60	0
Kapfenberger SV (loan)	2016–17	2. Liga	14	0	1	0	—		15	0
Kapfenberger SV (loan)	2017–18	2. Liga	33	0	1	0	—		34	0
Kapfenberger SV (loan)	Total		47	0	2	0	—		49	0
Career total			134	0	10	0	14	0	158	0
