= Roman Kerschbaum =

Austrian footballer

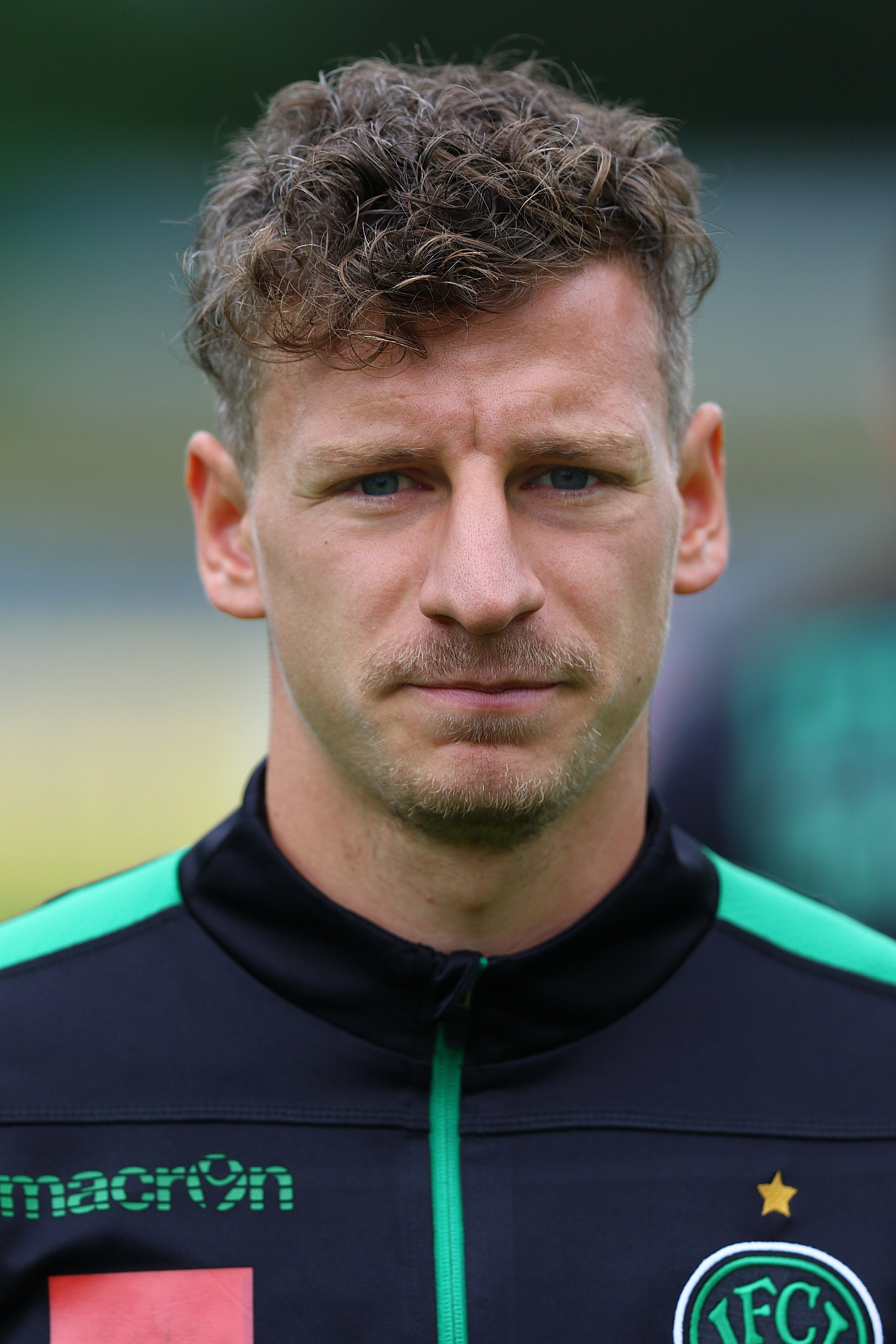
- Kerschbaum in 2018

Personal information
- Date of birth: 10 January 1994 (age 32)
- Place of birth: Neunkirchen, Austria
- Height: 1.80 m (5 ft 11 in)
- Position: Midfielder

Team information
- Current team: SV Gloggnitz
- Number: 54

Youth career
- 2000–2004: Willendorf SV
- 2004–2005: Neunkirchen SC
- 2005–2007: Kottingbrunn ASK
- 2007–2012: SKN St. Pölten

Senior career*
Years	Team	Apps	(Gls)
2012–2014	FC Nürnberg II	66	(7)
2014–2016	Grödig	28	(1)
2016–2019	Wacker Innsbruck	80	(6)
2019–2022	Admira Wacker	84	(18)
2022–2025	Rapid Wien	58	(2)
2026–	SV Gloggnitz	13	(4)
- * Club domestic league appearances and goals as of 21 June 2026

Roman Kerschbaum (born 19 January 1994) is an Austrian professional footballer who plays as a midfielder for SV Gloggnitz.

== Career ==
Born in Neunkirchen, Kerschbaum has previously played for Nürnberg and Grödig.

== Career statistics ==
As of match played 11 May 2025

Appearances and goals by club, season and competition
Club	Season	League			Cup		Continental		Other		Total	
Club	Season	Division	Apps	Goals	Apps	Goals	Apps	Goals	Apps	Goals	Apps	Goals
Grödig	2014–15	Austrian Bundesliga	7	0	2	0	—		—		9	0
Grödig	2015–16	Austrian Bundesliga	21	1	0	0	—		—		21	1
Grödig	Total		28	1	2	0	—		—		30	1
Wacker Innsbruck	2016–17	2. Liga	26	4	1	0	—		—		27	4
Wacker Innsbruck	2017–18	2. Liga	33	2	3	2	—		—		36	4
Wacker Innsbruck	2018–19	Austrian Bundesliga	21	0	1	0	—		—		22	0
Wacker Innsbruck	Total		80	6	5	2	—		—		85	8
Admira Wacker	2019–20	Austrian Bundesliga	29	3	1	0	—		—		30	3
Admira Wacker	2020–21	Austrian Bundesliga	29	6	2	2	—		—		31	8
Admira Wacker	2021–22	Austrian Bundesliga	26	9	2	1	—		—		28	10
Admira Wacker	Total		84	18	5	3	—		—		89	21
Rapid Wien	2022–23	Austrian Bundesliga	27	2	5	1	3	0	—		35	3
Rapid Wien	2023–24	Austrian Bundesliga	28	0	5	0	4	0	—		37	0
Rapid Wien	2024–25	Austrian Bundesliga	3	0	3	0	1	0	—		7	0
Rapid Wien	Total		58	2	13	1	8	0	0	0	79	3
Career total			262	43	37	9	40	7	0	0	339	59
