= Guido Burgstaller =

Austrian footballer (born 1989)

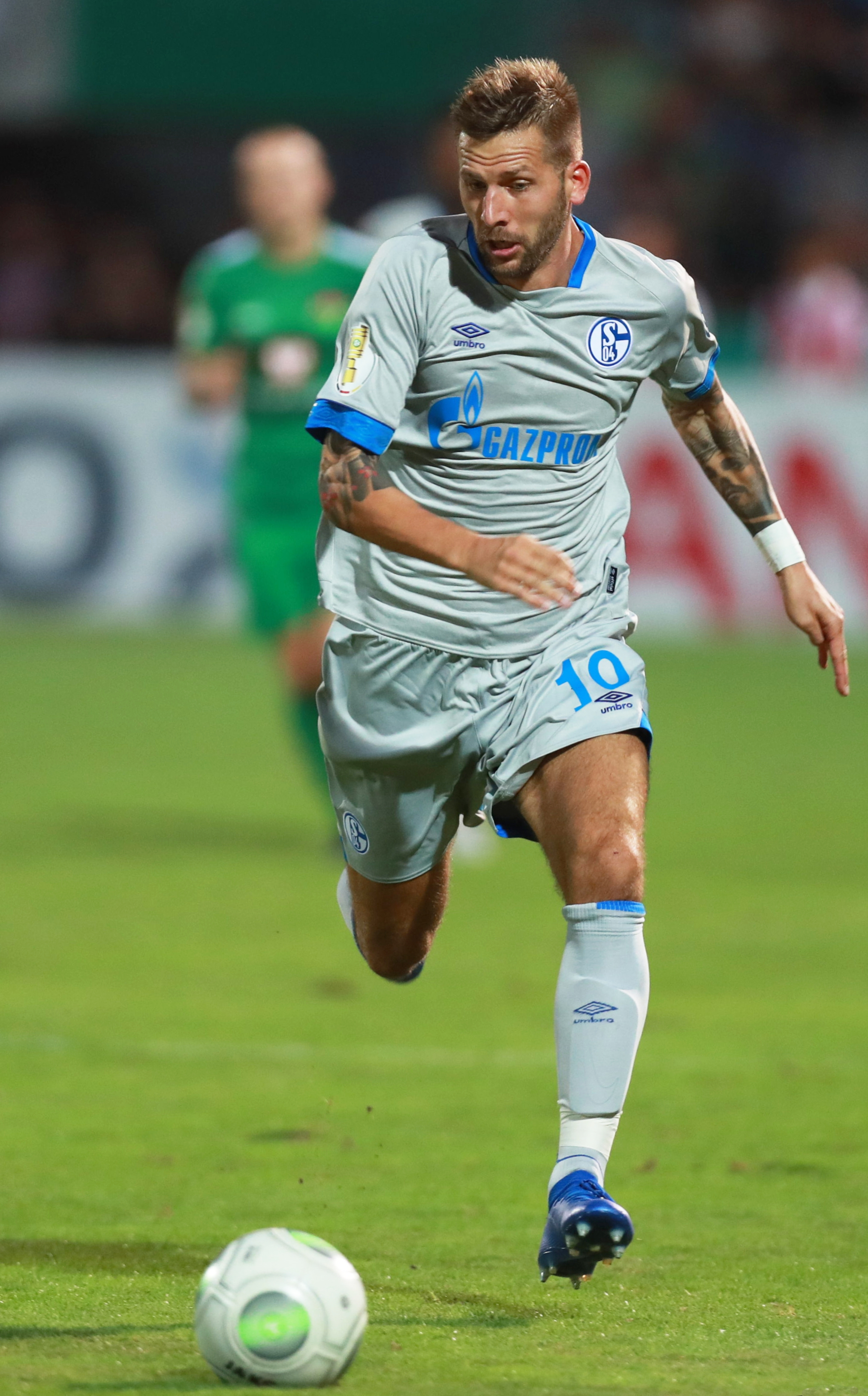
- Burgstaller with Schalke 04 in 2018

Personal information
- Date of birth: 29 April 1989 (age 37)
- Place of birth: Villach, Carinthia, Austria
- Height: 1.87 m (6 ft 2 in)
- Position: Striker

Senior career*
Years	Team	Apps	(Gls)
2006–2008	FC Kärnten	33	(2)
2008–2011	Wiener Neustadt	81	(12)
2011–2014	Rapid Wien	85	(24)
2014–2015	Cardiff City	3	(0)
2015–2017	1. FC Nürnberg	63	(33)
2017–2020	Schalke 04	95	(24)
2020–2022	FC St. Pauli	53	(29)
2022–2025	Rapid Wien	71	(33)
Total		484	(157)

International career
2007	Austria U19	4	(3)
2008	Austria U20	4	(0)
2009–2010	Austria U21	11	(0)
2012–2023	Austria	26	(2)
- * Club domestic league appearances and goals

Guido Burgstaller (German pronunciation: [ˈɡu̯iːdo ˈbʊɐ̯kʃtalɐ]; born 29 April 1989) is a former Austrian professional footballer who played as a striker.

== Club career ==
=== Cardiff City ===
On 23 May 2014, Burgstaller joined Cardiff City on a three-year deal as Ole Gunnar Solskjær's second signing of the summer, after Javi Guerra. Burgstaller said "My decision to join Cardiff City was never in question when the club first contacted me, it has always been a dream for me to play in this country. I've followed Cardiff in the Premier League last season and I'm very proud and honoured to be given the chance to wear the Cardiff City jersey – I'm a big admirer of the passion of the fans."

He made his debut in the Championship on 8 August, replacing Kenwyne Jones for the last 20 minutes of a 1–1 draw at Blackburn Rovers on the opening day of the season. Five days later, he scored within four minutes of his first start as Cardiff won 2–1 away to Coventry City in the first round of the League Cup.

On 26 January 2015, Burgstaller left Cardiff by mutual consent, joining 2. Bundesliga side Nürnberg on an undisclosed deal four days later.

=== Schalke 04 ===
On 12 January 2017, Burgstaller joined Schalke 04 for an undisclosed fee. At the time, he was top scorer in the 2. Bundesliga with fourteen goals, and was signed as the Royal Blues had only one fit striker in Eric Maxim Choupo-Moting. On 21 January, he scored on his debut, the only goal of the match in a win over Ingolstadt. Afterwards, Burgstaller had an inconsistent run in terms of goalscoring in the Bundesliga, but braces against Augsburg, Wolfsburg and Bayer Leverkusen helped him become Schalke's top scorer with nine goals.

In Burgstaller's first full season as a Schalke player, he was named as Domenico Tedesco's top striker, following the departures of Choupo-Moting and Klaas-Jan Huntelaar. His first goal of the season came against Stuttgart, and in October, he scored in three consecutive matches, including in a DFB-Pokal second round tie against Wehen Wiesbaden. On 25 November, he netted the first goal in a 4–4 draw against Borussia Dortmund, in a match where Schalke were 4–0 down at halftime. On 7 February 2018, Burgstaller scored the only goal of the match in a win over Wolfsburg, taking them to the DFB-Pokal semi-finals for the first time since the 2010–11 season.

=== FC St. Pauli ===
In September 2020, having terminated his contract with Schalke 04, Burgstaller moved to 2. Bundesliga club FC St. Pauli. He agreed a three-year contract with FC St. Pauli.

=== Return to Rapid Wien ===
In June 2022, Burgstaller returned to Rapid Wien, for which he played from 2011 to 2014, signing a two-year contract. On 14 December 2024, Burgstaller was attacked after an argument in downtown Vienna. He suffered a basilar skull fracture and was ruled out for months.

On 15 May 2025 after several months on the sidelines due to the previous head injury, he announced his retirement from active football.

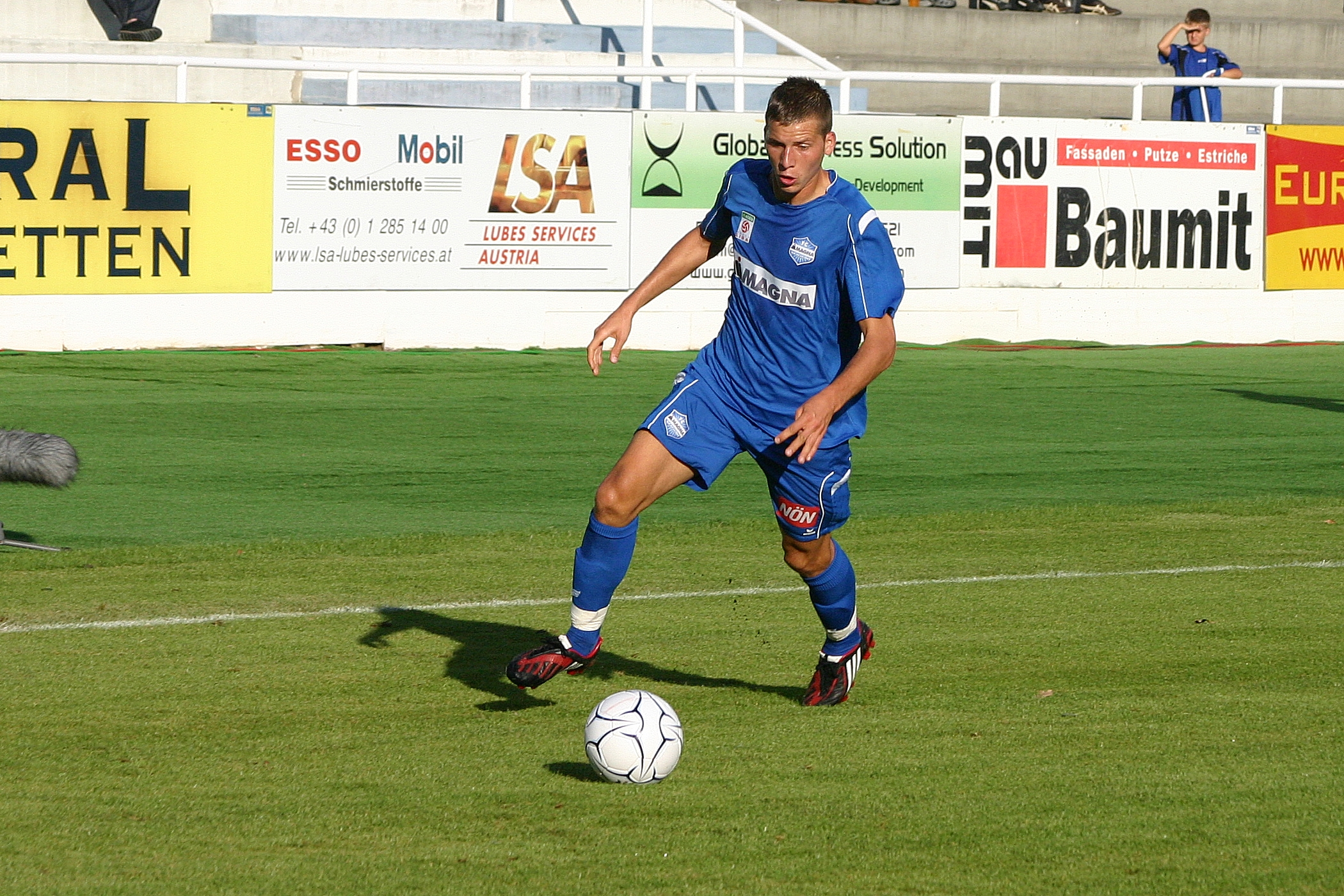
Burgstaller with Wiener Neustadt in 2008

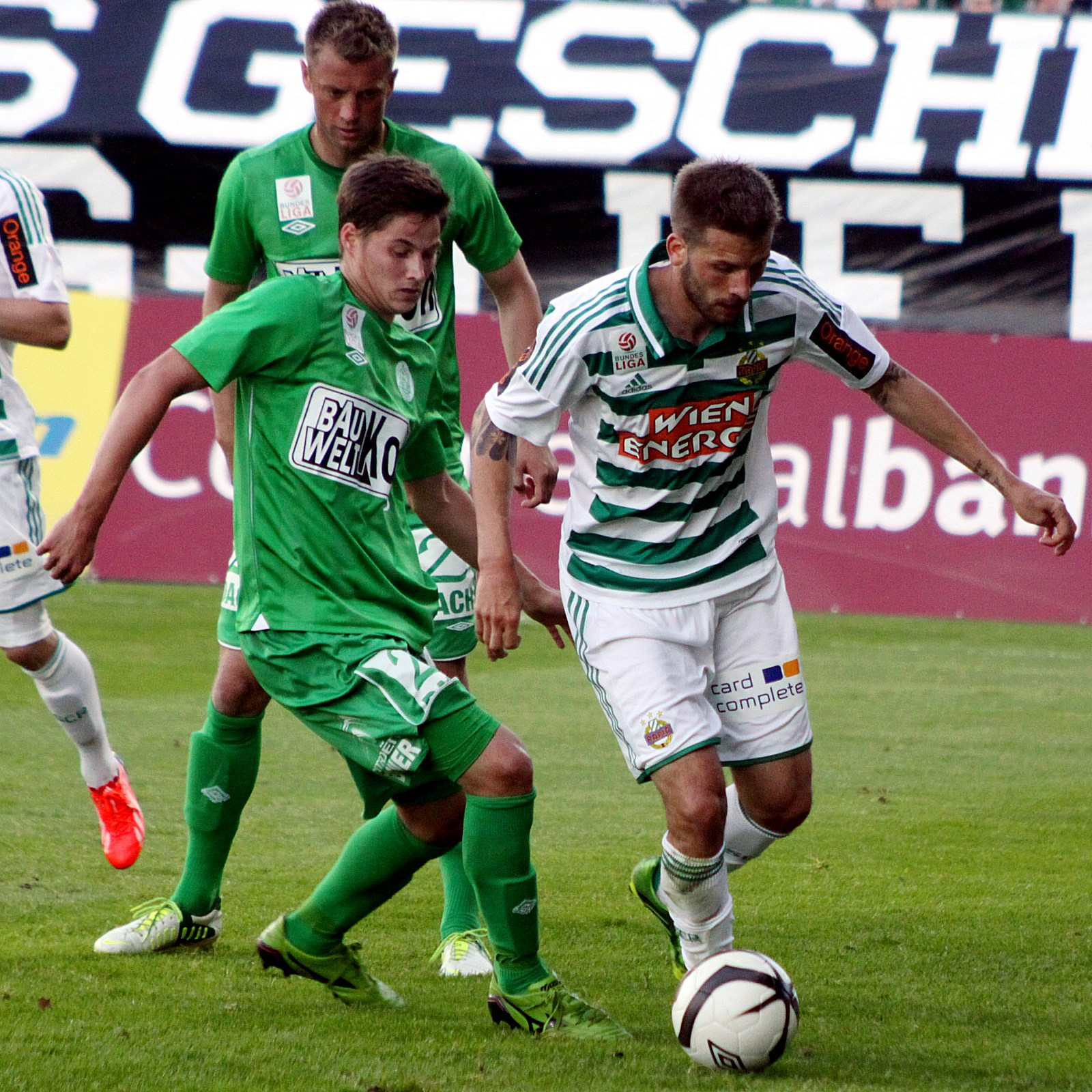
Rapid Wien in 2013

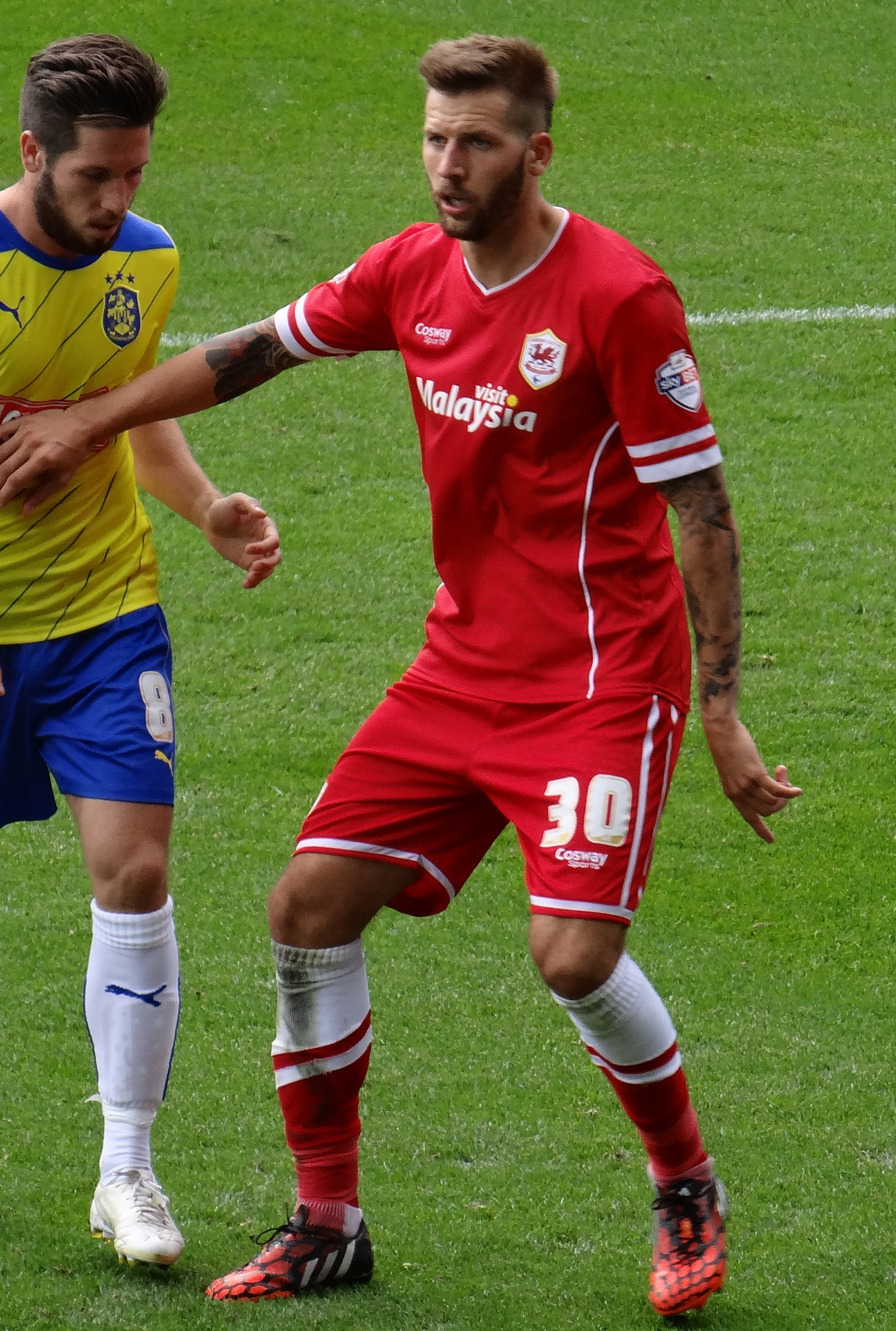
Cardiff City in 2014

== International career ==
Burgstaller debuted for the Austrian senior squad on 29 February 2012, playing the last five minutes of a 3–1 friendly victory over Finland as a replacement for Andreas Ivanschitz. He scored his first goal for Austria on 6 October 2017, netting the 1–1 equalizer in a 3–2 win against Serbia.

Burgstaller retired from the national team on 26 August 2019, but came back on 16 October 2023 in a 1–0 away victory against Azerbaijan in the UEFA Euro 2024 qualifying after being called up by national coach Ralf Rangnick. In this match, he came on as a substitute in the 82nd minute and was sent off in stoppage time with a second yellow card.

== Career statistics ==
=== Club ===
As of match played 1 June 2025

Appearances and goals by club, season and competition
Club	Season	League			Cup		Europe		Other		Total	
Club	Season	League	Apps	Goals	Apps	Goals	Apps	Goals	Apps	Goals	Apps	Goals
FC Kärnten	2006–07	Austrian 2. Liga	4	1	0	0	–		–		4	1
FC Kärnten	2007–08	Austrian 2. Liga	29	1	–		–		–		29	1
FC Kärnten	Total		33	2	0	0	–		–		33	2
Wiener Neustadt	2008–09	Austrian 2. Liga	26	7	4	1	–		–		30	8
Wiener Neustadt	2009–10	Austrian Bundesliga	30	0	3	0	–		–		33	0
Wiener Neustadt	2010–11	Austrian Bundesliga	25	5	1	0	–		–		26	5
Wiener Neustadt	Total		81	12	8	1	–		–		89	13
Rapid Wien	2011–12	Austrian Bundesliga	23	7	2	0	0	0	–		25	7
Rapid Wien	2012–13	Austrian Bundesliga	32	6	4	2	8 (Note: Appearances in UEFA Europa League)	0	–		44	8
Rapid Wien	2013–14	Austrian Bundesliga	30	11	1	0	9	1	–		40	12
Rapid Wien	Total		85	24	7	2	17	1	–		109	27
Cardiff City	2014–15	Championship	3	0	0	0	–		2 (Note: Appearances in League Cup)	1	5	1
1. FC Nürnberg	2014–15	2. Bundesliga	14	6	0	0	–		–		14	6
1. FC Nürnberg	2015–16	2. Bundesliga	33	13	3	1	–		2 (Note: Appearances in Bundesliga relegation play-offs)	0	38	14
1. FC Nürnberg	2016–17	2. Bundesliga	16	14	2	0	–		–		18	14
1. FC Nürnberg	Total		63	33	5	1	–		2	0	70	34
Schalke 04	2016–17	Bundesliga	18	9	2	0	5	3	–		25	12
Schalke 04	2017–18	Bundesliga	32	11	5	2	–		–		37	13
Schalke 04	2018–19	Bundesliga	24	4	3	0	6 (Note: Appearances in UEFA Champions League)	1	–		33	5
Schalke 04	2019–20	Bundesliga	21	0	3	2	–		–		24	2
Schalke 04	Total		95	24	13	4	11	4	–		119	32
FC St. Pauli	2020–21	2. Bundesliga	22	11	0	0	–		–		22	11
FC St. Pauli	2021–22	2. Bundesliga	31	18	4	2	–		–		35	20
FC St. Pauli	Total		53	29	4	2	–		–		57	31
Rapid Wien	2022–23	Austrian Bundesliga	31	21	6	3	6 (Note: Appearances in UEFA Conference League)	1	–		43	25
Rapid Wien	2023–24	Austrian Bundesliga	20	7	4	1	3	1	–		27	9
Rapid Wien	2024–25	Austrian Bundesliga	20	5	0	0	13 (Note: Six appearances and four goals in UEFA Europa League, seven appearances and two goals in UEFA Conference League)	6	–		33	11
Rapid Wien	Total		71	33	10	4	22	6	–		103	45
Career total			484	157	47	14	50	13	4	1	585	185

=== International ===
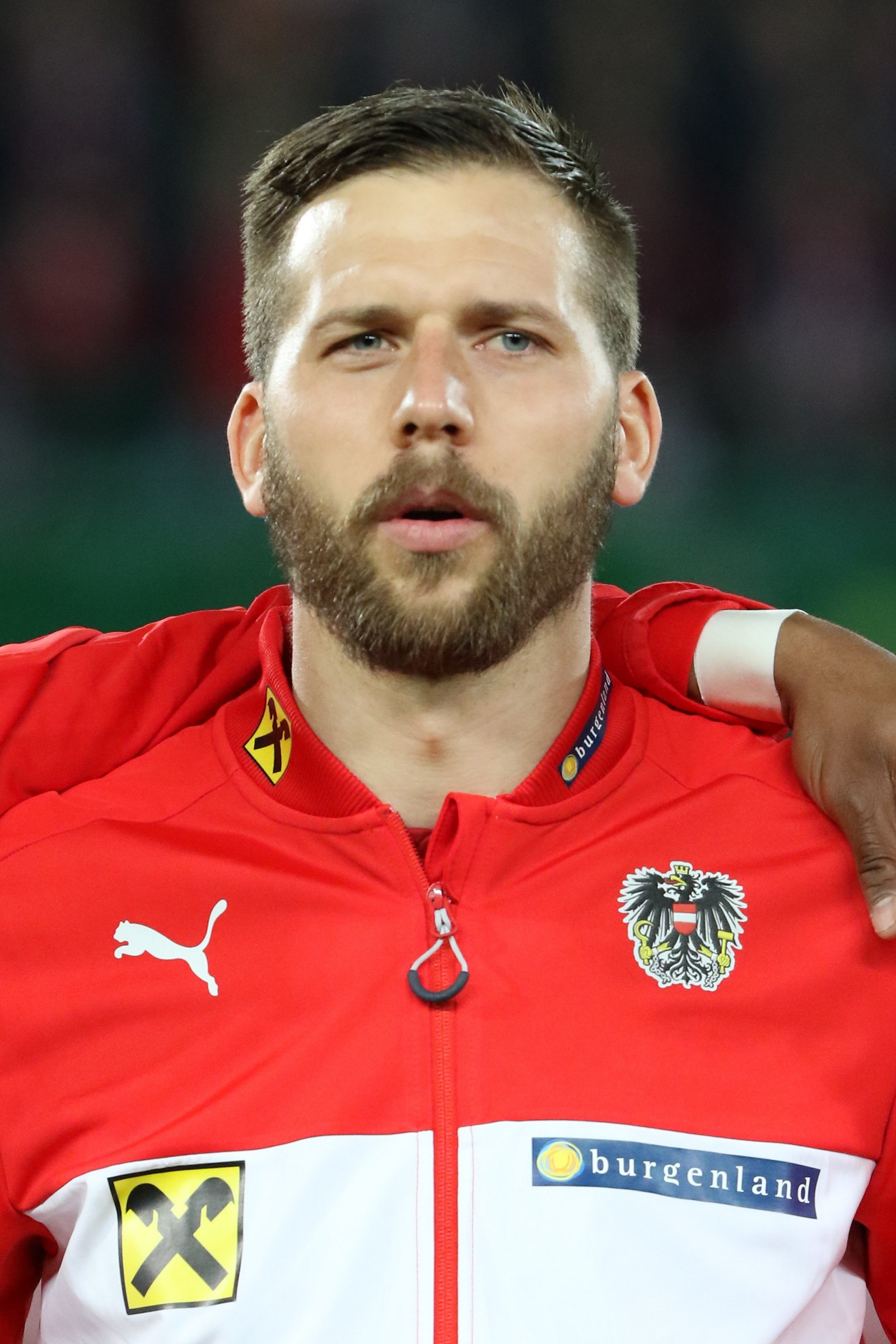
Burgstaller with Austria in 2016

As of match played 16 October 2023.

Appearances and goals by national team and year
National team	Year	Apps	Goals
Austria	2012	5	0
Austria	2013	2	0
Austria	2014	0	0
Austria	2015	0	0
Austria	2016	2	0
Austria	2017	5	1
Austria	2018	9	0
Austria	2019	2	1
Austria	2020	0	0
Austria	2021	0	0
Austria	2022	0	0
Austria	2023	1	0
Total		26	2

Scores and results list Austria's goal tally first, score column indicates score after each Burgstaller goal.

List of international goals scored by Guido Burgstaller
#	Date	Venue	Opponent	Score	Result	Competition
1.	6 October 2017	Ernst-Happel-Stadion, Vienna, Austria	Serbia	1–1	3–2	2018 FIFA World Cup qualification
2.	7 June 2019	Wörthersee Stadion, Klagenfurt, Austria	Slovenia	1–0	1–0	UEFA Euro 2020 qualification

== Honours ==
Individual

- Austrian Bundesliga top scorer: 2022–23
