= Nikolas Sattlberger =

Austrian footballer

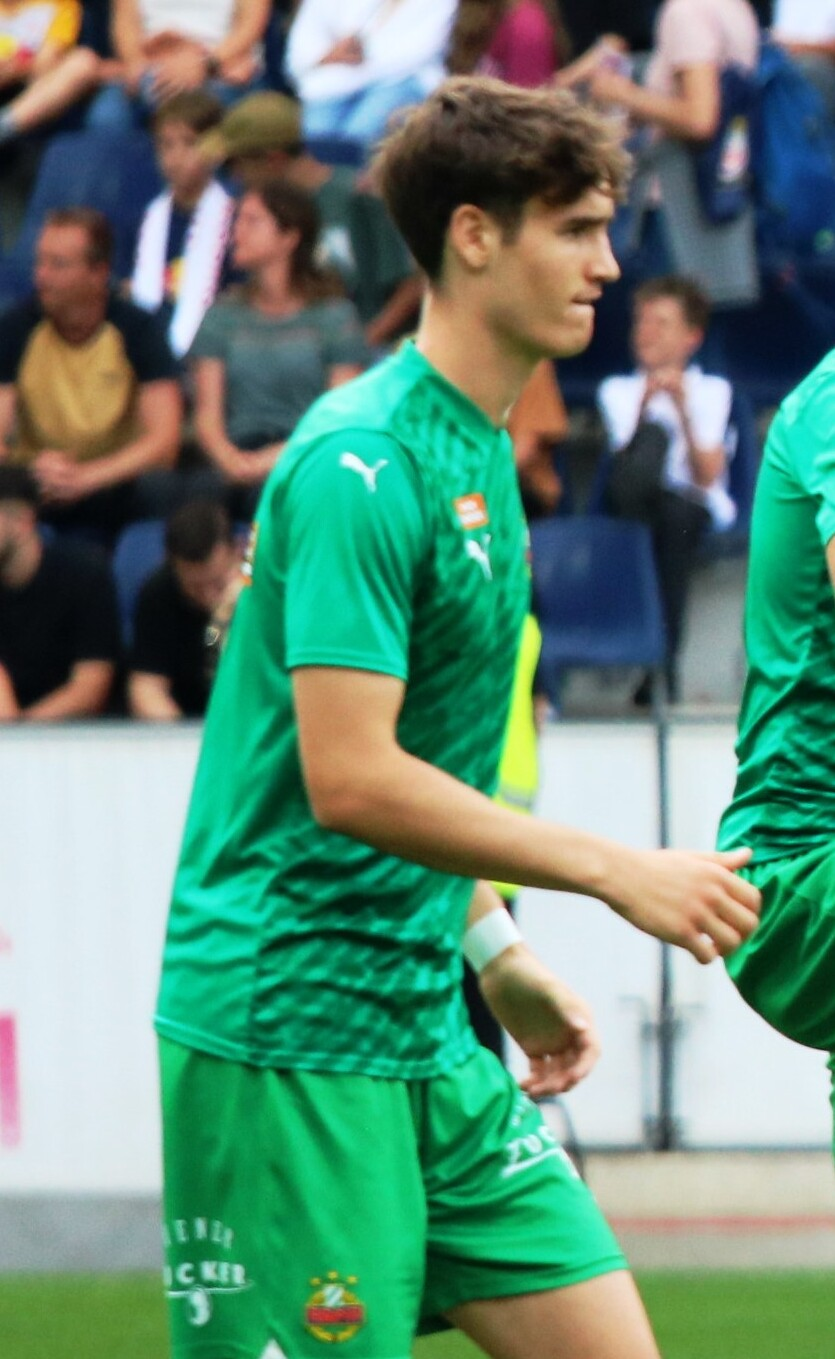
- Sattlberger in 2023

Personal information
- Date of birth: 18 January 2004 (age 22)
- Place of birth: Vienna, Austria
- Height: 1.89 m (6 ft 2 in)
- Position: Midfielder

Team information
- Current team: Genk
- Number: 24

Youth career
- –2012: SG Inter AGO
- 2012–2018: First Vienna
- 2018–2022: Rapid Wien

Senior career*
Years	Team	Apps	(Gls)
2020–2023	Rapid Wien II	31	(1)
2022–2024	Rapid Wien	33	(0)
2024–	Genk	54	(1)

International career^{‡}
2019	Austria U15	3	(0)
2019–2020	Austria U16	7	(0)
2020	Austria U17	1	(0)
2022	Austria U18	4	(0)
2022	Austria U19	3	(0)
2023–	Austria U21	12	(0)
- * Club domestic league appearances and goals as of 22 August 2026 ‡ National team caps and goals as of 18 October 2024

Nikolas Sattlberger (born 18 January 2004) is an Austrian footballer who plays for Belgian club Genk as a midfielder.

== Club career ==
Sattlberger made his professional debut for Rapid Wien during first leg of UEFA Europa Conference League second qualifying round game against Lechia Gdańsk. Three days later he started his first Austrian Bundesliga game in the home match against Ried.

On 5 August 2024, Sattlberger signed a five-season contract with Genk in Belgian Pro League.

== International career ==
Sattlberger has played internationally for Austria at under-15, under-16, under-17 and under-18 levels.

== Career statistics ==
As of match played 22 August 2026

Appearances and goals by club, season and competition
Club	Season	League			Cup		Continental		Other		Total	
Club	Season	Division	Apps	Goals	Apps	Goals	Apps	Goals	Apps	Goals	Apps	Goals
Rapid Wien II	2020–21	2. Liga	7	0	—		—		—		7	0
Rapid Wien II	2021–22	2. Liga	7	1	—		—		—		7	1
Rapid Wien II	2022–23	2. Liga	17	0	—		—		—		17	0
Rapid Wien II	Total		31	1	—		—		—		31	1
Rapid Wien	2022–23	Austrian Bundesliga	3	0	0	0	3 (Note: Appearances in UEFA Europa Conference League)	0	—		6	0
Rapid Wien	2023–24	Austrian Bundesliga	30	0	4	0	4	0	—		38	0
Rapid Wien	Total		33	0	4	0	7	0	—		44	0
Genk	2024–25	Belgian Pro League	27	1	3	0	—		—		30	1
Genk	2025–26	Belgian Pro League	24	0	2	0	9 (Note: Appearances in UEFA Europa League)	0	—		35	0
Genk	2026–27	Belgian Pro League	3	0	0	0	—		—		3	0
Genk	Total		54	1	5	0	9	0	—		68	1
Career total			118	2	9	0	16	0	0	0	143	2
