= Fally Mayulu =

French footballer (born 2002)

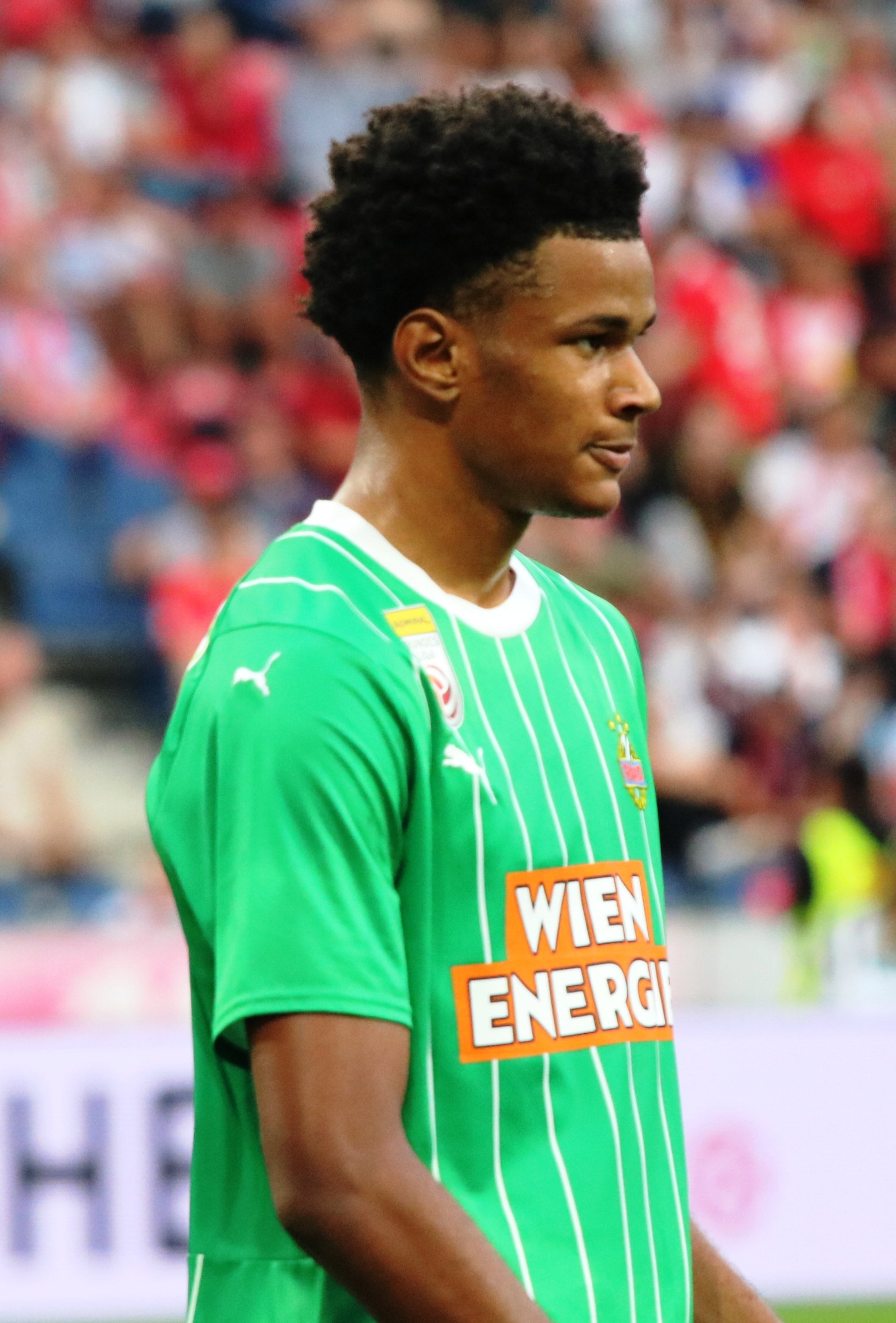
- Fally Mayulu

Personal information
- Full name: Fally N'Dofunsu Mayulu
- Date of birth: 15 July 2002 (age 24)
- Height: 1.93 m (6 ft 4 in)
- Position: Forward

Team information
- Current team: Arouca
- Number: 9

Youth career
- Épinay
- Entente SSG
- 2017–2020: Lens
- 2020: VfL Wolfsburg

Senior career*
Years	Team	Apps	(Gls)
2020–2021	VfL Wolfsburg II	1	(0)
2022–2023	Blau-Weiß Linz	43	(14)
2023–2024	Rapid Wien	28	(6)
2024–2026	Bristol City	25	(2)
2025	→ Sturm Graz (loan)	2	(0)
2026–	Arouca	3	(0)
- * Club domestic league appearances and goals as of 25 May 2026

Fally N'Dofunsu Mayulu (born 15 July 2002) is a French professional footballer who plays as a forward for Primeira Liga club Arouca.

== Club career ==
Mayulu passed through the academies of Épinay and Entente SSG before joining Lens. After three years with Lens, he went on trial with Paris Saint-Germain, but would ultimately end up joining German side VfL Wolfsburg.

In February 2022, Mayulu joined Austrian side BW Linz.

On 3 March 2023, Mayulu signed a four-season contract with Rapid Wien, beginning in the 2023–24 season.

=== Bristol City ===
On 1 July 2024, Mayulu signed for EFL Championship club Bristol City.

On 26 January 2025, Mayulu returned to Austria when he joined Sturm Graz on loan for the remainder of the season.

=== Arouca ===
On 2 February 2026, Mayulu joined Primeira Liga club Arouca on a contract until June 2029.

== International career ==
Mayulu is eligible to represent France and the Democratic Republic of the Congo at international level.

== Personal life ==
Mayulu's younger brother Senny is also a footballer, and is a product of the Paris Saint-Germain Youth Academy.

== Career statistics ==
=== Club ===
As of 2 February 2026

Appearances and goals by club, season and competition
Club	Season	League			National cup (Note: Includes Austrian Cup, FA Cup)		League cup (Note: Includes EFL Cup)		Europe		Total	
Club	Season	Division	Apps	Goals	Apps	Goals	Apps	Goals	Apps	Goals	Apps	Goals
VfL Wolfsburg II	2020–21	Regionalliga Nord	1	0	–		–		–		1	0
BW Linz	2021–22	2. Liga	13	3	0	0	–		–		13	3
BW Linz	2022–23	2. Liga	30	11	3	1	–		–		33	12
BW Linz	Total		43	14	3	1	–		–		46	15
Rapid Wien	2023–24	Austrian Bundesliga	28	6	4	5	–		3 (Note: Appearances in UEFA Europa Conference League)	0	35	11
Bristol City	2024–25	EFL Championship	15	2	1	0	1	0	–		17	2
Bristol City	2025–26	EFL Championship	10	0	0	0	1	0	–		11	0
Bristol City	Total		25	2	1	0	2	0	–		28	2
Sturm Graz (loan)	2024–25	Austrian Bundesliga	2	0	1	0	–		–		3	0
Career total			99	22	9	6	2	0	3	0	113	28
