= Patrick Greil =

Austrian footballer (born 1996)

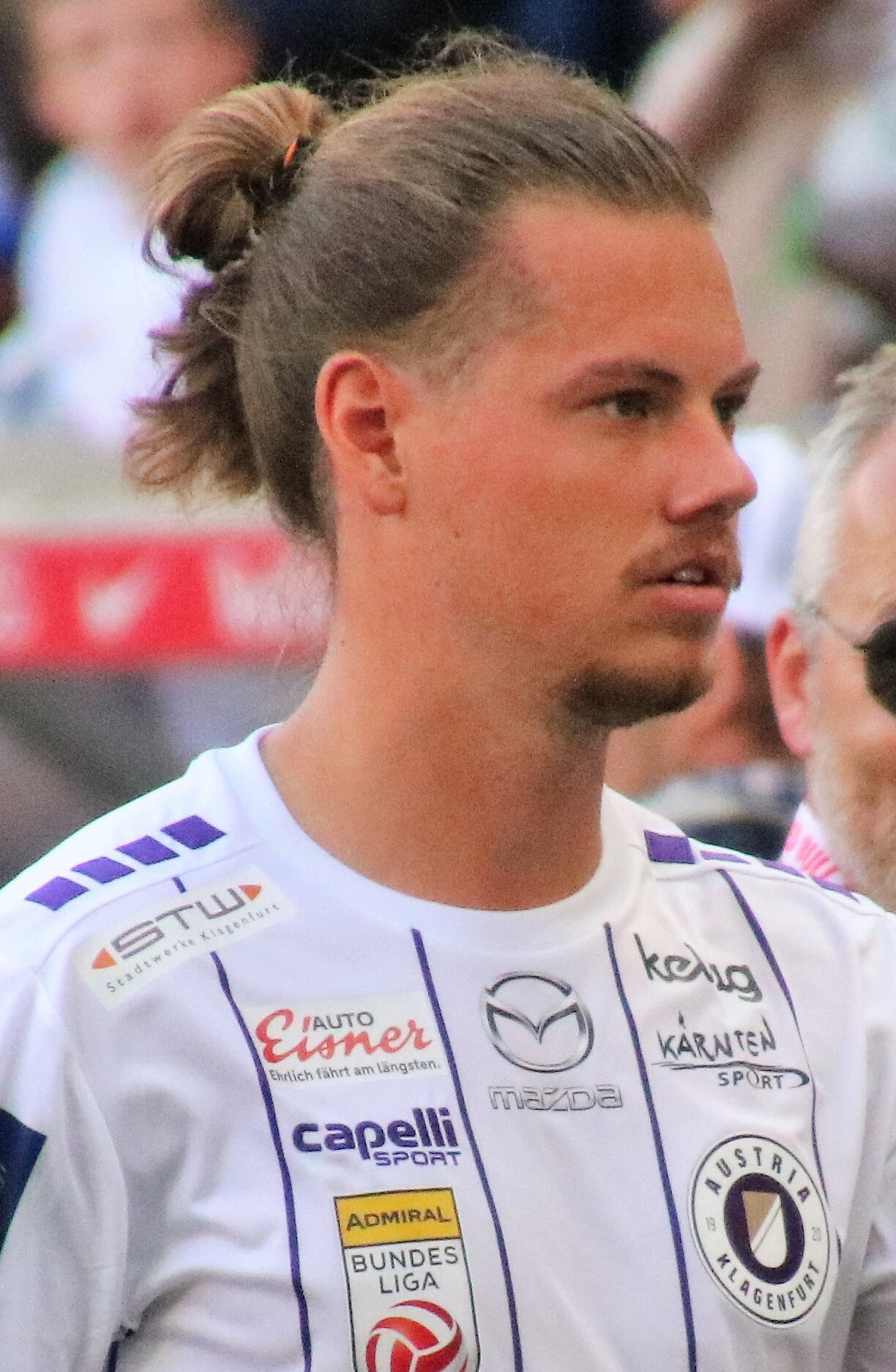
- Greil in 2022

Personal information
- Date of birth: 8 September 1996 (age 30)
- Place of birth: Stockerau, Austria
- Height: 1.84 m (6 ft 0 in)
- Position: Attacking midfielder

Team information
- Current team: Rheindorf Altach
- Number: 18

Youth career
- 2002–2005: ASK Salzburg
- 2005–2007: ASK Maxglan
- 2007–2012: Red Bull Salzburg
- 2012–2013: SV Wals-Grünau
- 2013–2014: Anif

Senior career*
Years	Team	Apps	(Gls)
2014–2018	Anif	116	(28)
2018–2022	Austria Klagenfurt	118	(18)
2022–2023	Rapid Wien	33	(1)
2024–2025	SV Sandhausen	43	(10)
2025–	Rheindorf Altach	29	(12)
- * Club domestic league appearances and goals as of 10 June 2026

Patrick Greil (born 8 September 1996) is an Austrian professional footballer who plays as an attacking midfielder for Austrian Bundesliga club Rheindorf Altach.

== Career ==
Greil is a product of the youth academies of ASK Salzburg, ASK Maxglan, Red Bull Salzburg, SV Wals-Grünau and Anif. He began his senior career with Anif in the Austrian Regionalliga in 2014. After four years with Anif and over 100 appearances, Greil transferred to Austria Klagenfurt in the 2. Liga on 12 June 2018. He played for seasons at Austria Klagenfurt, making over 100 appearances with them as well and helping them get promoted to the Austrian Bundesliga before leaving on a free transfer in the summer of 2022.

He transferred to Rapid Wien on 24 May 2022, signing a contract until 2025.

On 18 December 2023, Greil signed a contract with SV Sandhausen in Germany.

== Career statistics ==
As of 21 August 2022

Appearances and goals by club, season and competition
Club	Season	League			Cup		Continental		Other		Total	
Club	Season	Division	Apps	Goals	Apps	Goals	Apps	Goals	Apps	Goals	Apps	Goals
Austria Klagenfurt	2018–19	2. Liga	28	3	1	0	—		—		29	3
Austria Klagenfurt	2019–20	2. Liga	28	3	1	0	—		—		29	3
Austria Klagenfurt	2020–21	2. Liga	31	8	3	0	—		—		34	8
Austria Klagenfurt	2021–22	Austrian Bundesliga	31	4	3	3	—		—		34	7
Austria Klagenfurt	Total		118	18	8	3	—		—		126	21
Rapid Wien	2022–23	Austrian Bundesliga	2	0	1	0	3	0	—		6	0
Career total			82	24	8	1	4	0	0	0	94	25
