= Jonas Auer =

Austrian footballer

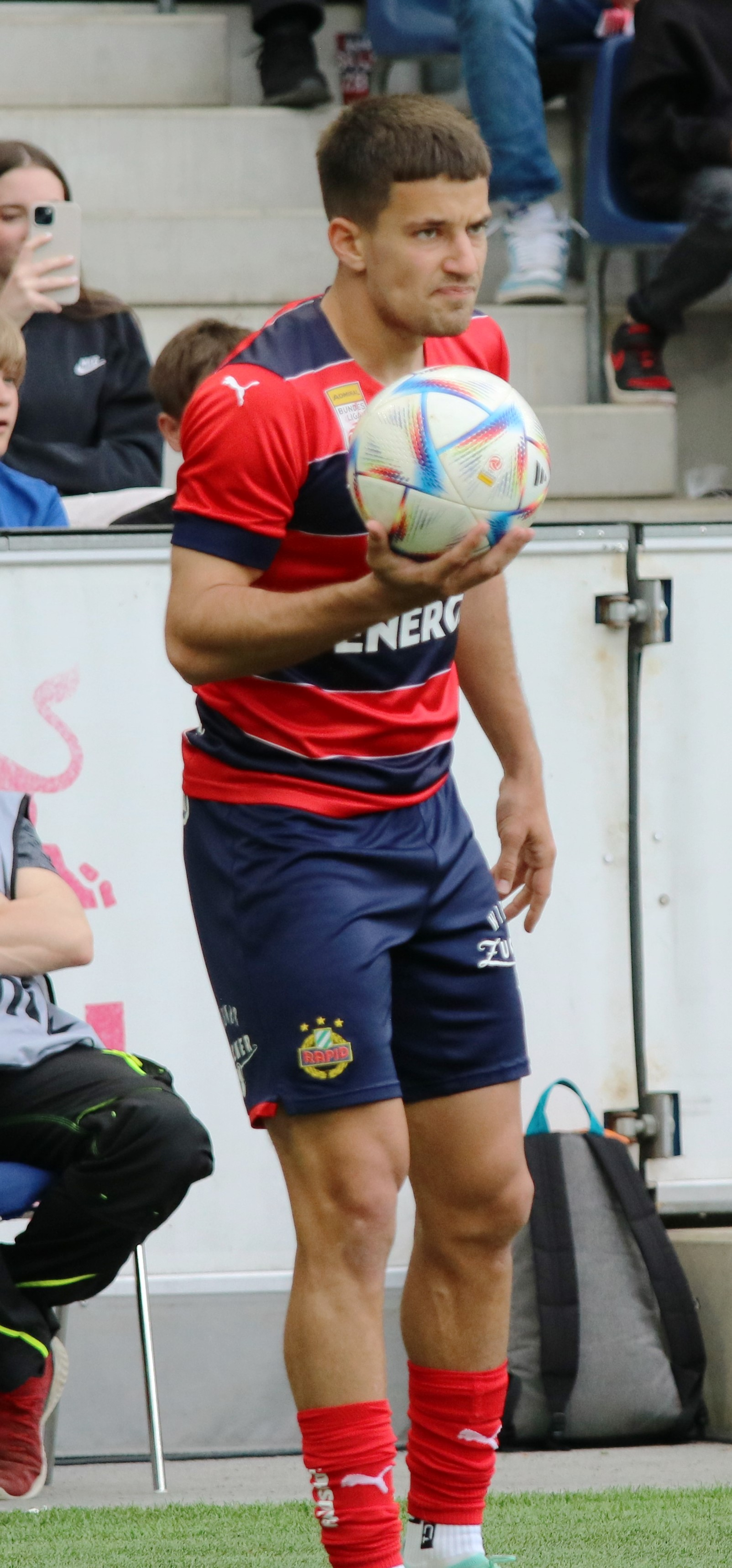
- Auer in 2023

Personal information
- Full name: Jonas Antonius Auer
- Date of birth: 5 August 2000 (age 26)
- Place of birth: Austria
- Positions: Midfielder; winger

Team information
- Current team: SK Rapid Wien
- Number: 23

Senior career*
Years	Team	Apps	(Gls)
–2018	SKN St. Pölten	0	(0)
2018–2019	SK Slavia Prague	0	(4)
2018–2019	→ FK Viktoria Žižkov (loan)	14	(1)
2019–2021	FK Mladá Boleslav	6	(0)
2020–2021	→ FK Viktoria Žižkov (loan)	20	(0)
2021–	SK Rapid Wien	106	(3)

International career^{‡}
2017	Austria U17	2	(0)
2017–2018	Austria U18	10	(4)
2018–2019	Austria U19	2	(0)
2019–2021	Austria U20	2	(0)
2021–2023	Austria U21	11	(1)
- * Club domestic league appearances and goals as of 2 August 2026 ‡ National team caps and goals as of 10:47, 16 March 2023 (UTC)

Jonas Auer (born 5 August 2000 in Austria) is an Austrian footballer who now plays for SK Rapid Wien.

== Career ==
Auer started his senior career with SKN St. Pölten. After that, he played for SK Slavia Prague and FK Viktoria Žižkov. In 2019, he signed for FK Mladá Boleslav in the Czech First League, where he has made ten appearances and scored zero goals.

== Career statistics ==
=== Club ===
As of match played 12 August 2026

Appearances and goals by club, season and competition
Club	Season	League			Cup		Continental		Other		Total	
Club	Season	Division	Apps	Goals	Apps	Goals	Apps	Goals	Apps	Goals	Apps	Goals
Slavia Prague	2018–19	Czech First League	0	0	0	0	0	0	—		0	0
Viktoria Žižkov (loan)	2018–19	Czech National Football League	14	1	—		—		—		14	1
Mladá Boleslav	2019–20	Czech First League	6	0	2	0	2 (Note: Appearances in UEFA Europa League)	0	—		10	0
Viktoria Žižkov (loan)	2019–20	Czech National Football League	20	0	2	1	—		—		22	1
Rapid Wien	2021–22	Austrian Bundesliga	21	0	4	0	12 (Note: One appearance in UEFA Champions League, four appearances in UEFA Europa League, seven appearances in UEFA Europa Conference League)	0	2	1	39	1
Rapid Wien	2022–23	Austrian Bundesliga	28	0	5	0	5 (Note: Appearances in UEFA Europa Conference League)	0	—		38	0
Rapid Wien	2023–24	Austrian Bundesliga	26	1	2	0	4	0	—		32	1
Rapid Wien	2024–25	Austrian Bundesliga	25	2	1	0	14 (Note: Six appearances in UEFA Europa League, eight appearances in UEFA Europa Conference League)	0	—		40	2
Rapid Wien	2025–26	Austrian Bundesliga	5	0	1	0	5	0	—		11	0
Rapid Wien	2026–27	Austrian Bundesliga	1	0	1	0	4	0	—		6	0
Rapid Wien	Total		106	3	14	0	46	0	2	1	166	4
Career total			146	4	18	1	47	0	2	1	212	6
