= Ante Bajić =

Austrian association footballer

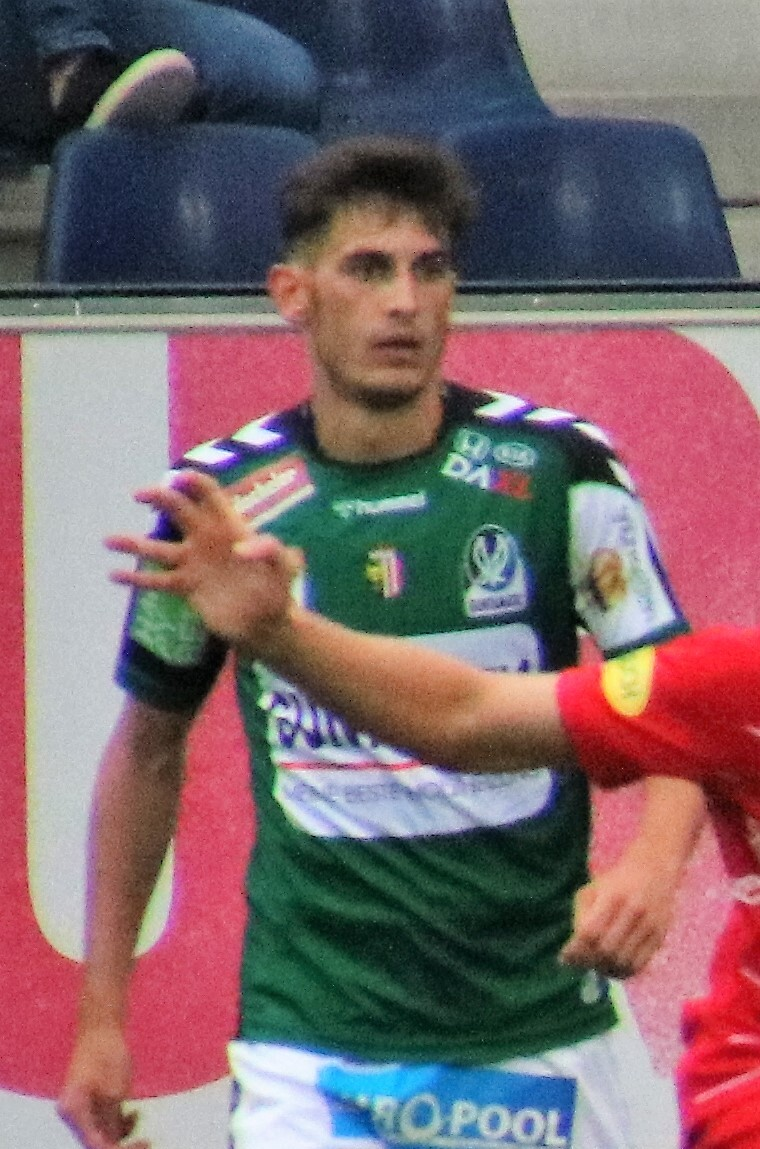
- Bajić in 2021

Personal information
- Date of birth: 22 August 1995 (age 31)
- Place of birth: Innviertel, Austria
- Height: 1.83 m (6 ft 0 in)
- Position: Winger

Team information
- Current team: Ried
- Number: 12

Youth career
- 2002–2005: Altheim
- 2005–2007: Wacker Burghausen

Senior career*
Years	Team	Apps	(Gls)
2014–2018	Union Gurten	98	(13)
2018–2022	Ried	80	(24)
2022–2024	Rapid Wien	30	(2)
2024–	Ried	69	(19)
- * Club domestic league appearances and goals as of 10 June 2026

Ante Bajić (born 22 August 1995) is an Austrian professional footballer who plays as a winger for SV Ried.

== Career ==
Bajić is a product of the youth academies of Altheim and the German club Wacker Burghausen. He began his career with Union Gurten in the Austrian Regionalliga. He moved to Ried in the 2. Liga on 18 June 2018. He made his professional debut with Ried in a 3–0 2. Liga win over FC Liefering on 17 August 2018. After 80 appearances with Ried and helping them win the 2019–20 Austrian Football Second League, Bajić transferred to Rapid Wien on 13 June 2022.

On 5 January 2024, Bajić returned to SV Ried on a 3 1/2-year contract.

== Personal life ==
Born in Austria, Bajić is of Croatian descent.

== Honours ==
Ried

- 2. Liga: 2019–20
