= Alexander Wrabetz =

Chairman of SK Rapid Wein, Austrian Bundesliga Football Club

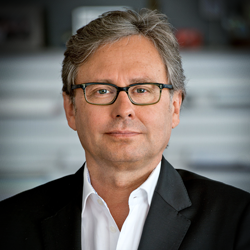
- Born: 21 March 1960; Vienna, Austria
- Education: University of Vienna
- Occupation: Business executive
- Title: Director General of the ORF; Member of the Executive Board of the European Broadcasting Union
- Political party: Social Democratic Party
- Spouse: Petra Wrabetz (?–2015)
- Children: 3

Alexander Wrabetz (born 21 March 1960) is the current chairman of the Austrian Football Bundesliga club SK Rapid Wien since 26 November 2022, and previously served as the Director General of the Austrian public broadcaster Österreichischer Rundfunk (ORF) from 1 January 2007 until 31 December 2021. He was also a Member of the Executive Board of the European Broadcasting Union.

== Education ==
Wrabetz grew up in the Vienna Döbling district, where his family was politically close to the Freedom Party. He attended the 2nd federal grammar school in Vienna's 19th district between 1970 and 1978. During his studies at the University of Vienna from 1978 to 1983, Wrabetz became involved in the Social Democratic Party together with Austria's former Federal Chancellor Werner Faymann. During the National Council elections of 1983, he organised the successful preference vote election campaign of Josef Cap. He served as Federal Chairman of the Socialist Students of Austria from 1983 to 1984. With Wrabetz as their Chairman and top candidate, the Socialist Students achieved their best-ever result at the elections for the Austrian National Union of Students in 1983, when they received 26% of the votes.

== Professional career ==
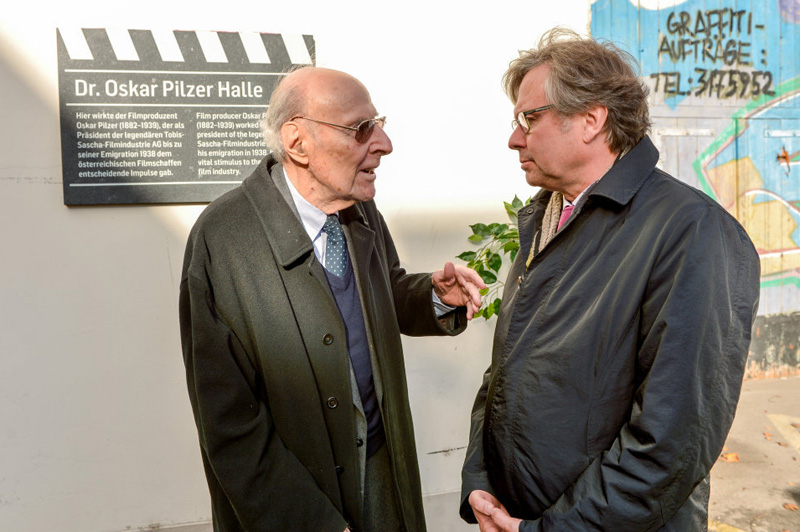
On Wednesday November 6, 2013, ORF Director General Dr. Alexander Wrabetz and George Pilzer unveiled a commemorative plaque in honour of the latter's father, pioneer filmmaker Oskar Pilzer in Hall 1 of the Vienna Rosenhügel Studios.

After completing his law studies and obtaining his doctor's degree in law in 1983, Wrabetz continued with his court internship. He then worked at the Erste Bank from 1984 to 1987. In 1987, he went on to become Assistant to the Board of Directors at the Österreichische Industrieverwaltungs-AG (ÖIAG), was Managing Director of Voest Alpine Intertrading GmbH in Linz from 1992, and subsequently Member of the Board of VAMED in Vienna, also part of the ÖIAG Group, from 1995 to 1998. He served as member of the Supervisory Board in several companies of ÖIAG and, as of 1995, he was appointed member of the ORF Board of Trustees, the predecessor of the current ORF Foundation Board.

Gerhard Weis, the ORF Director General from 1998 to 2001, appointed him Commercial Director of the company, a position he was then confirmed in by Monika Lindner during her period in office. In 2005, due to the outsourcing of the ORF broadcasting technology and its sale to a consortium with the participation of the Raiffeisen Group, Wrabetz was able to achieve the highest operating profit in the history of the ORF.

=== ORF Director General ===
On 17 August 2006, Wrabetz was elected Director General by the ORF Foundation Board. He assumed his duties on 1 January 2007. For the first time, Wrabetz initiated special themes that spanned across all ORF media. The first special theme was launched in January 2008 and dealt with the topic of climate change and its impact. Numerous cultural, environmental, and contemporary theme weeks have followed since.

In April 2011, he announced that he would stand for re-election in August 2011. In the afternoon of 9 August 2011, he was re-elected ORF Director General with 29 out of 35 votes cast, making him only the second ORF Director after Gerd Bacher since 1967 to be elected for a second term in office. He announced that one of his priorities during his second term in office would be founding ORF III as a special-interest channel for culture. ORF III, a special-interest channel for culture went on air on 26 October 2011, at the initiative of Alexander Wrabetz. ORF III, sometimes also referred to as ORF 3, is an Austrian special-interest channel that was conceived as a complement to the general interest programmes of ORF 1 and ORF 2, and which focuses in particular on cultural topics. Under Wrabetz, the ORF launched its in-house online television media library, the ORF TVThek on 13 November 2009. Alexander Wrabetz believes that "venturing into smart television is an essential element of ORF’s strategy". In February 2013, Wrabetz presented the ORF second-screen application "Schladming APP". It was followed by the presentation of the "Nationalratswahl APP 2013" in the summer of 2013. After the successful second-screen application, available during the ski world championship in Schladming, and the one during the 2013 National Council elections, Wrabetz continued ORF's venture into the smart television age with the "ORF Ski Weltcup APP". He introduced the "ORF Ski Weltcup APP" at the Ski World Cup Opening in Sölden, Tyrol, on 26 October 2013.

== Family ==
Alexander Wrabetz was married to Petra Wrabetz, a general practitioner and sports physician. They divorced in 2015. The couple has two sons (born 1988 and 1991) and one daughter (born 1993).
