= Oliver Strunz =

Austrian footballer (born 2000)

Personal information
- Date of birth: 14 June 2000 (age 26)
- Place of birth: Austria
- Height: 1.85 m (6 ft 1 in)
- Position: Forward

Team information
- Current team: Rapid Wien II
- Number: 7

Youth career
- 2002–2008: First Vienna
- 2008–2016: Rapid Wien

Senior career*
Years	Team	Apps	(Gls)
2018–	Rapid Wien II	64	(20)
2021–2025	Rapid Wien	30	(4)
2024–2025	→ Rheindorf Altach (loan)	15	(0)
2025	→ Floridsdorfer AC (loan)	13	(0)

International career
2017	Austria U17	1	(2)
2017–2018	Austria U18	3	(0)
2021	Austria U21	1	(0)
- * Club domestic league appearances and goals as of 14 August 2026

Oliver Strunz (born 14 June 2000) is an Austrian professional footballer who plays as a forward for 2. Liga side Rapid Wien II.

== Club career ==
Strunz began playing football at the youth academy of First Vienna, and Rapid Wien. He began his senior career with Rapid Wien II in 2018. He made his professional debut with Rapid Wien in a 4–1 Austrian Football Bundesliga to Wolfsberger AC on 7 November 2021, coming on as a late substitute in the 91st minute. He signed a professional contract with Rapid Wien on 20 March 2021, keeping him at the club until June 2024.

For the 2024–25 season, Strunz moved on loan to Rheindorf Altach.

In January 2025, the loan-deal ended with Rheindorf Altach, and then he joined Floridsdorfer AC on a loan-deal for the rest of the season.

== International career ==
Strunz is a youth international for Austria, having represented the Austria U17s, U18s, and U21s.

== Career statistics ==
As of 17 June 2022

Appearances and goals by club, season and competition
Club	Season	League			Cup		Continental		Other		Total	
Club	Season	Division	Apps	Goals	Apps	Goals	Apps	Goals	Apps	Goals	Apps	Goals
Rapid Wien	2021–22	Austrian Bundesliga	4	0	3	0	3	0	—		10	0
Career total			4	0	3	0	3	0	0	0	10	0
