= René Kriwak =

Austrian footballer (born 1999)

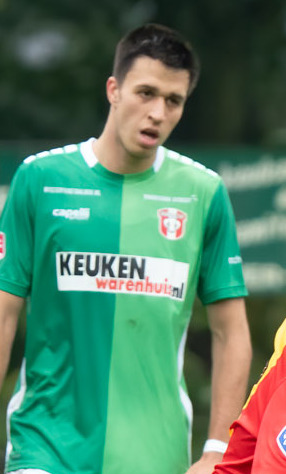
- Kriwak in 2023 with FC Dordrecht

Personal information
- Date of birth: 30 April 1999 (age 27)
- Height: 1.98 m (6 ft 6 in)
- Position: Forward

Team information
- Current team: Rapid Wien II
- Number: 19

Youth career
- 2004–2007: Markgrafneusiedl SC
- 2007–2011: Großschweinbarth SV
- 2011–2017: Admira Wacker

Senior career*
Years	Team	Apps	(Gls)
2017–2019	Admira Wacker II	33	(6)
2019	SV Stripfing	1	(0)
2019–2021	FC Marchfeld	25	(12)
2021–2022	Wiener SC	13	(11)
2022	Rapid Wien II	15	(8)
2022–2023	Rapid Wien	3	(0)
2022–2023	→ TSV Hartberg (loan)	24	(2)
2023–2025	FC Dordrecht	31	(10)
2025–	Rapid Wien II	0	(0)
- * Club domestic league appearances and goals as of 15 October

René Kriwak (born 30 April 1999) is an Austrian professional footballer who plays as a forward for Rapid Wien II.

Having played youth football for Admira Wacker, Kriwak had spells at lower league sides Admira Wacker II, SV Stripfing, FC Marchfeld and Wiener SC, before signing his first professional contract at Rapid Wien in 2022. He spent the 2022–23 season on loan at TSV Hartberg before signing for Dutch side FC Dordrecht in summer 2023.

== Club career ==
After playing youth football at Markgrafneusiedl SC and Großschweinbarth SV, he joined the academy of Admira Wacker aged 12. The 2017–18 season saw Kriwak move to the club's reserve team, but Kriwak failed to break into the Wacker first team, signing for fourth-tier SV Stripfing in 2019. Kriwak was injured in his first match for the club, and his contract was not extended following Stripfing's promotion to the Austrian Regionalliga in summer 2019. He subsequently spent two seasons at Regionalliga club FC Marchfeld, scoring 12 goals in 25 matches.

Kriwak signed for Wiener SC in May 2021. After 11 goals in 13 matches in the first half of the 2021–22 season for Wiener SC, Kriwak joined Austrian Bundesliga club Rapid Wien on a two-and-a-half-year contract in January 2022, initially joining their reserve side. He scored 8 goals in 13 matches for the clubs reserve side, and was promoted to the first team squad for the 2022–23 season.

Kriwak made 6 first-team appearances for Rapid Wien at the start of the 2022–23 season, but he joined TSV Hartberg, also of the Austrian Bundesliga, on a season-long loan on 31 August 2022. He scored on his full debut for the club in a 3–2 defeat at home to Austria Klagenfurt, and also scored in the following match as Hartberg won 3–0 away at LASK. He ended the season with 2 goals in 24 Bundesliga appearances.

In June 2023, Kriwak signed for Eerste Divisie side FC Dordrecht on a two-year contract with the option for a further year. He scored 10 goals in 31 league matches for Dordrecht across the 2023–24 season.

== Style of play ==
Kriwak is 1.98 metres tall. Rapid Wien manager Zoran Barisic described Kriwak as a "versatile attacker who, due to his size, is also extremely strong in the air".

== Personal life ==
Kriwak grew up in Matzen, Lower Austria. He was a childhood Rapid Wien fan. On the start to season 24/25 he received an injury, which cost him play the whole season.
