= 2018–19 SK Rapid Wien season =

Rapid Wien
2018–19 season
- President: Michael Krammer
- Head Coach: Dietmar Kühbauer; Goran Djuricin (until 29 September)
- Stadium: Allianz Stadion, Vienna, Austria
- Bundesliga: 8th (Regular season); 1st (Relegation round); Runner-up (EL Play-off)
- Austrian Cup: Runner-up
- Europa League: Round of 32
- Top goalscorer: League: Thomas Murg (7); All: Christoph Knasmüllner (11); Thomas Murg (11)
- Highest home attendance: 26,000 vs. FK Austria Wien, 16 September 2018
- Lowest home attendance: 10,600 vs. SV Mattersburg, 28 May 2019
- Average home league attendance: 15,900
Home colours	Away colours	Third colours

The 2018–19 SK Rapid Wien season was the 121st season in club history.

== Pre-season and friendlies ==
Date	Opponents	Venue	Result F–A	Goalscorers		Attendance
Date	Opponents	Venue	Result F–A	Rapid Wien	Opponent	Attendance
28 June 2018	ASK Ebreichsdorf	A	2–0	Gashi 39', Kostić 44'		1,000
4 July 2018	Slavia Prague	N	0–2		Tecl 26', Sýkora 45'	1,400
8 July 2018	Krylia Sovetov	N	1–0	Arase 16'		700
14 July 2018	Hamburger SV	H	1–2	Malicsek 47'	Steinmann 42', Ito 59'	10,700
15 January 2019	SV Horn	H	5–0	Ivan 12', Berisha 15', Knasmüllner 55' 59', Müldür 84'		300
19 January 2019	Floridsdorfer AC	H	1–0	Pavlović 35'		300
25 January 2019	FC Aarau	N	5–2	Ivan 7', Alar 26', Dibon 52', Müldür 73', Pavlović 83'	Maierhofer 18', Mišić 75'	–
29 January 2019	Odense Boldklub	N	2–5	Knasmüllner 35', Schwab 52'	Nielsen 8' 19', Desler 17', Festersen 34', Tverskov 59'	–
1 February 2019	AC Horsens	N	1–1	Knasmüllner 61'; Junker 39'		–
8 February 2019	NK Triglav Kranj	H	5–2	Schwab 10', Murg 50', Knasmüllner 55', Sonnleitner 72', Pavlović 90'	Majcen 26', Kumer 56'	300

== Bundesliga ==
=== Bundesliga fixtures and results ===
Win Draw Loss

MD	Date – KO	Opponent	Venue	Result F–A	Attendance	Goalscorers and disciplined players		Table			Ref.
MD	Date – KO	Opponent	Venue	Result F–A	Attendance	Rapid Wien	Opponent	Pos.	Pts.	GD	Ref.
1	29 July 2018 17:00	Admira Wacker Mödling	A	3–0	5,200	Murg 6'; Ivan 23'; Bolingoli 44'		1st	3	+3	
2	4 August 2018 17:00	Rheindorf Altach	H	1–1	15,200	Alar 35'	Aigner 88'	3rd	4	+3	
3	12 August 2018 17:00	Wolfsberger AC	H	0–0	14,800			4th	5	+3	
4	19 August 2018 17:00	LASK	A	1–2	5,864	Knasmüllner (penalty missed); Berisha 85'	Ramsebner 65'; Wiesinger 89'	7th	5	+2	
5	26 August 2018 17:00	Wacker Innsbruck	H	2–1	17,400	Schwab 18'; Alar 69'	Freitag 89'	5th	8	+3	
6	2 September 2018 17:00	Sturm Graz	A	1–1	14,487	Alar 78'	Žulj 37' (pen.)	5th	9	+3	
7	16 September 2018 17:00	Austria Wien	H	0–1	26,000		Grünwald 57'	7th	9	+2	
8	23 September 2018 17:00	Red Bull Salzburg	A	1–2	16,000	Hofmann 89'	Minamino 36'; Dabour 76'	7th	9	+1	
9	29 September 2018 17:00	St. Pölten	H	0–2	15,600	Ivan (red card) 59'	Gartler 44'; Balić 64'	8th	9	−1	
10	7 October 2018 14:30	Mattersburg	H	1–0	18,200	Knasmüllner 11'		7th	12	+0	
11	20 October 2018 17:00	Hartberg	A	0–3	5,024		Sittsam 9'; Tadić 17'; Flecker 65'	9th	12	−3	
12	28 October 2018 14:20	Admira Wacker Mödling	H	2–0	14,600	Sonnleitner 31' 62'		7th	15	−1	
13	4 November 2018 17:00	Rheindorf Altach	A	2–2	5,038	Sonnleitner 9'; Murg 42'	Fischer 32' 48'	7th	16	−1	
14	11 November 2018 14:30	Wolfsberger AC	A	1–3	5,444	Murg 37'	Orgill 46'; Liendl 90+2' (pen.) 90+5'	8th	16	−3	
15	25 November 2018 17:00	LASK	H	0–1	17,600		Holland 54'	8th	16	−4	
16	2 December 2018 14:30	Wacker Innsbruck	A	1–0	7,665	Berisha 90+2'		8th	19	−3	
17	9 December 2018 17:00	Sturm Graz	H	0–0	17,700			8th	20	−3	
18	16 December 2018 17:00	Austria Wien	A	1–6	16,582	Potzmann 29'; Ljubicic (red card) 33'	Schoissengeyr 22'; Jeggo 35'; Monschein 36'; Klein 41'; Barać 57' (o.g.); Turgeman 78'	8th	20	−8	
19	24 February 2019 17:00	Red Bull Salzburg	H	2–0	19,400	Berisha 65'; Schwab 81'	Ramalho (red card) 54'	8th	23	−6	
20	2 March 2019 17:00	St. Pölten	A	4–0	7,195	Pavlović 17'; Ljubicic 45'; Knasmüllner 52'; Sonnleitner 68'		7th	26	−2	
21	10 March 2019 17:00	Mattersburg	A	1–2	10,200	Schobesberger 38'	Gruber 13'; Mahrer 81'	7th	26	−3	
22	17 March 2019 17:00	Hartberg	H	2–2	19,200	Schwab 5' (pen.); Murg 28'	Hofmann 55' (o.g.); Huber 58'	8th	27 (Note: Points were halved after regular season)	−3	
Relegation round
23	30 March 2019 17:00	Admira Wacker Mödling	H	3–0	11,600	Pavlović (penalty missed); Knasmüllner 38'; Schobesberger 53'; Badji 80'		1st	16	+0	
24	6 April 2019 17:00	Wacker Innsbruck	A	2–0	7,413	Dibon 7'; Alar 88'		1st	19	+2	
25	13 April 2019 17:00	Mattersburg	H	2–1	12,300	Knasmüllner 53'; Murg 59'	Höller 89'	1st	22	+3	
26	20 April 2019 17:00	Rheindorf Altach	A	2–2	5,912	Murg 89'; Pavlović 90+2'	Berisha 51'; Meilinger 78'	1st	23	+3	
27	23 April 2019 19:00	Hartberg	A	4–2	4,000	Swete 14' (o.g.); Murg 48'; Bolingoli 62'; Pavlović 74'	Rep 28'; Cancola 82'	1st	26	+5	
28	27 April 2019 17:00	Hartberg	H	3–4	13,100	Rotter 29' (o.g.); Huber 34' (o.g.); Murg (red card) 70'; Badji 84'	Kansmüllner 4' (o.g.); Tadić 14' (pen.); Cancola 65' (pen.); Sanogo 80'	1st	26	+4	
29	4 May 2019 17:00	Admira Wacker Mödling	A	4–3	3,800	Badji 37' 42'; Sonnleitner 40'; Dibon 67'	Kalajdžić 53'; Maier 59'; Spasić 61'	1st	29	+5	
30	11 May 2019 17:00	Wacker Innsbruck	H	1–0	13,800	Badji 64'		1st	32	+6	
31	18 May 2019 17:00	Mattersburg	A	0–1	4,200		Pušić 8'	1st	32	+5	
32	25 May 2019 17:00	Rheindorf Altach	H	1–2	13,500	Pavlović 71'	Berisha 53'; Fischer 62'	1st	32	+4	

==== Play-off rounds ====
Leg	Date – KO	Opponent	Venue	Result F–A	Attendance	Goalscorers and disciplined players		Ref.
Leg	Date – KO	Opponent	Venue	Result F–A	Attendance	Rapid Wien	Opponent	Ref.
SF	28 May 2019 19:00	Mattersburg	H	2–0	10,600	Knasmüllner 8'; Badji 13'		
F-1	30 May 2019 17:00	Sturm Graz	H	1–2	15,900	Schwab 60'	Jantscher 69' (pen.); Greiml 78' (o.g.)	
F-2	2 June 2019 17:00	Sturm Graz	A	1–0	9,315	Spendlhofer 43' (o.g.)		

=== League table ===
==== Regular season ====
Pos	Team	Pld	W	D	L	GF	GA	GD	Pts	Qualification
6	St. Pölten	22	8	6	8	26	29	−3	30	Qualification for the Championship round
7	Mattersburg	22	8	5	9	28	36	−8	29	Qualification for the Relegation round
8	Rapid Wien	22	7	6	9	26	29	−3	27	Qualification for the Relegation round
9	Hartberg	22	7	5	10	35	45	−10	26	Qualification for the Relegation round
10	Admira Wacker Mödling	22	5	6	11	26	42	−16	21	Qualification for the Relegation round

Source: Austrian Football Bundesliga
Rules for classification: 1) Points; 2) Goal difference; 3) Goals scored; 4) Matches won; 5) Away matches won; 6) Head-to-head points; 7) Head-to-head goal difference; 8) Head-to-head goals scored.

==== Relegation round ====
Pos	Team	Pld	W	D	L	GF	GA	GD	Pts	Qualification or relegation	RWI	MAT	ALT	ADM	HAR	WKR
1	Rapid Wien	32	13	7	12	48	44	+4	32	Qualification for the Europa League play-off semi-final	—	2–1	1–2	3–0	3–4	1–0
2	Mattersburg	32	12	7	13	41	48	−7	28	Qualification for the Europa League play-off semi-final	1–0	—	0–0	1–1	3–0	3–1
3	Rheindorf Altach	32	9	10	13	48	44	+4	28		2–2	2–1	—	2–2	3–1	1–4
4	Admira Wacker Mödling	32	8	9	15	42	62	−20	22		3–4	0–2	1–1	—	2–3	3–2
5	Hartberg	32	10	5	17	48	66	−18	22		2–4	2–1	0–1	3–1	—	0–2
6	Wacker Innsbruck (R)	32	8	5	19	32	51	−19	20	Relegation to Austrian Football Second League	0–2	4–0	0–4	1–3	1–0	—

Source: Austrian Football Bundesliga
Rules for classification: 1) Points; 2) Points with (possible) half points subtracted due to rounding; 3) Goal difference; 4) Goals scored; 5) Matches won; 6) Away matches won; 7) Head-to-head points; 8) Head-to-head goal difference; 9) Head-to-head goals scored.
(R) Relegated

=== Results summary ===
Overall								Home						Away					
Pld	W	D	L	GF	GA	GD	Pts	W	D	L	GF	GA	GD	W	D	L	GF	GA	GD
35	15	7	13	52	46	+6	52	8	4	6	23	17	+6	7	3	7	29	29	0

== Austrian Cup ==
=== Austrian Cup fixtures and results ===
Win Loss Postponed

Round	Date	Opponent	Venue	Result F–A	Attendance	Goalscorers and disciplined players		Ref.
Round	Date	Opponent	Venue	Result F–A	Attendance	Rapid Wien	Opponent	Ref.
1st	20 July 2018	FC Kufstein	A	5–0	2,000	Ivan 5' 62'; Berisha 19'; Alar 34' 58'		
2nd	26 September 2018	SV Mattersburg	A	1–1 (5–4 p)	5,300	Knasmüllner 38'	Kvasina 45+2' (pen.)	
R16	31 October 2018	Wolfsberger AC	A	3–0	3,755	Pavlović 22' 45+1'; Knasmüllner 58'		
QF	17 February 2019	TSV Hartberg	H	5–2	12,700	Murg 43' 90+1'; Pavlović 49' 74'; Hofmann 52'	Martic 69' (o.g.); Rasswalder 82'	
SF	3 April 2019 20:30	LASK Linz	A	1–1 (5–4 p)	6,087	Hofmann 54' (red card) 90+4'	Goiginger 16'; Ranftl (red card) (after end of game)	
F	1 May 2019 16:30	RB Salzburg	N	0–2	24,200		Farkas 37'; Dabour 39'	

== Europa League ==
=== Europa League review ===
Rapid entered the Europa League in the 3rd qualifying round and reached the round of 32.

=== Qualifying rounds ===
Leg	Date	Opponent	Venue	Result F–A	Agg. score F–A	Attendance	Goalscorers and disciplined players		Ref.
Leg	Date	Opponent	Venue	Result F–A	Agg. score F–A	Attendance	Rapid Wien	Opponent	Ref.
Third qualifying round
FL	9 August 2018 21:05	(Slovakia) Slovan Bratislava	A	1–2	–	9,560	Schwab 12'; Alar (penalty missed)	Bozhikov 29'; Barać 49' (o.g.)	
SL	16 August 2018 20:30	(Slovakia) Slovan Bratislava	H	4–0	5–2	17,800	Knasmüllner 3' 79' 90+4'; Murg 84'		
Playoff round
FL	23 August 2018 20:30	(Romania) Steaua București	H	3–1	-	19,300	Knasmüllner 4'; Sonnleitner 40'; Schwab 49'; Berisha (red card) 84'	Gnohéré 47'	
SL	30 August 2018 20:30	(Romania) Steaua București	A	1–2	4–3	31,274	Sonnleitner 63'	Gnohéré 11'; Roman 45+2'; Bălașa (red card) 90+1'	

=== Group stage ===
==== Table ====
Pos	Team	Pld	W	D	L	GF	GA	GD	Pts	Qualification
1	(Spain) Villarreal	6	2	4	0	12	5	+7	10 (Note: Head-to-head points: Villarreal 4, Rapid Wien 1.)	Advance to knockout phase
2	(Austria) Rapid Wien	6	3	1	2	6	9	−3	10	Advance to knockout phase
3	(Scotland) Rangers	6	1	3	2	8	8	0	6	
4	(Russia) Spartak Moscow	6	1	2	3	8	12	−4	5	

Source: UEFA
Rules for classification: Group stage tiebreakers

==== Fixtures and results ====
MD	Date	Opponent	Venue	Result F–A	Attendance	Goalscorers and disciplined players		Table		Ref.
MD	Date	Opponent	Venue	Result F–A	Attendance	Rapid Wien	Opponent	Pos.	Pts.	Ref.
1	20 September 2018 18:55	Spartak Moscow (Russia)	H	2–0	21,400	Timofeyev 50' (o.g.); Murg 68'		1st	3	
2	4 October 2018 21:00	Rangers (Scotland)	A	1–3	47,500	Berisha 42'	Morelos 44' 90+4'; Tavernier 84' (pen.)	2nd	3	
3	25 October 2018 21:00	Villarreal (Spain)	A	0–5	14,158		Fornals 26'; Ekambi 30'; Barać 45' (o.g.); Raba 63'; Costa (red card) 79'; Gerard 85'	3rd	3	
4	8 November 2018 18:55	Villarreal (Spain)	H	0–0	22,100			4th	4	
5	29 November 2018 16:50	Spartak Moscow (Russia)	A	2–1	20,739	Müldür 80'; Schobesberger 90+1'	Zé Luís 20'	2nd	7	
6	13 December 2018 18:55	Rangers (Scotland)	H	1–0	23,850	Ljubicic 84'		2nd	10	

=== Knockout phase ===
==== Knockout phase results ====
Win Draw Loss

Leg	Date	Opponent	Venue	Result F–A	Agg. score F–A	Attendance	Goalscorers and disciplined players		Ref.
Leg	Date	Opponent	Venue	Result F–A	Agg. score F–A	Attendance	Rapid Wien	Opponent	Ref.
Round of 32
FL	14 February 2019 18:55	Inter Milan (Italy)	H	0–1	–	23,850		Martínez 39' (pen.)	
SL	21 February 2019 21:00	Inter Milan (Italy)	A	0–4	0–5	30,000		Vecino 10'; Ranocchia 18'; Perišić 80'; Politano 87'	

== Team record ==
Competition	First match	Last match	Record							
Competition	First match	Last match	M	W	D	L	GF	GA	GD	Win %
Bundesliga	29 July	2 June	35	15	7	13	52	46	+6	42.86
ÖFB Cup	20 July	1 May	6	5	0	1	15	6	+9	83.33
Europa League	9 August	21 February	12	5	1	6	15	19	−4	41.67
Total			52	24	8	20	82	71	+11	46.15

== Squad ==
=== Squad statistics ===
No.	Nat.	Name	Age	League		Austrian Cup		International		Total		Discipline		
No.	Nat.	Name	Age	Apps	Goals	Apps	Goals	Apps	Goals	Apps	Goals	Yellow card	(yellow card) (red card)	Red card
Goalkeepers
1	(Austria)	Richard Strebinger	25	32		5		12		49		1		
21	(Austria)	Tobias Knoflach	24	3		1				4		1		
Defenders
3	(Turkey)	Mert Müldür	19	20+6		3+2		7+3	1	30+11	1	11		
4	(Croatia)	Mateo Barać	23	10+2		2+2		9		21+4		4		
5	(Belgium)	Boli Bolingoli	23	26+2	2	3+1		8+2		37+5	2	9		
6	(Austria)	Mario Sonnleitner	31	24+1	5	5+1		10	2	39+2	7	6		
17	(Austria)	Christopher Dibon	27	15	2	1		1+1		17+1	2	2		
19	(Austria)	Marvin Potzmann	24	18+3	1	2+1		11		31+4	1	8		
20	(Austria)	Maximilian Hofmann	24	15	1	4	2	4+1		23+1	3	11		1
23	(Austria)	Manuel Thurnwald	19	3+3				1+2		4+5				
24	(Austria)	Stephan Auer	27	13+6		4		1+1		18+7		5		
47	(Austria)	Leo Greiml	16	0+1						0+1				
48	(Austria)	Patrick Obermüller	19	1						1				
Midfielders
7	(Austria)	Philipp Schobesberger	24	15+5	2	3		0+4	1	18+9	3	2		
8	(Austria)	Stefan Schwab	27	31+1	4	6		10+2	2	47+3	6	9		
10	(Austria)	Thomas Murg	23	28+4	7	5	2	10+1	2	43+5	11	5	1	
14	(Bosnia and Herzegovina)	Srđan Grahovac	25	10+1		2		2		14+1		1		
15	(Austria)	Manuel Martic	22	11+4		2		2+3		15+7		8		
16	(Austria)	Philipp Malicsek	21	2+1		0+1				2+2				
18	(Hungary)	Tamás Szántó	22											
25	(Austria)	Aleksandar Kostić	22	1+4		0+1		0+2		1+7		1		
26	(Croatia)	Ivan Močinić	25											
28	(Austria)	Christoph Knasmüllner	26	29+3	5	4+2	2	7+4	4	40+9	11			
39	(Austria)	Dejan Ljubicic	20	18+11	1	4		11+1	1	33+12	2	3		1
49	(Austria)	Nicholas Wunsch	17	0+2						0+2				
Forwards
9	(Norway)	Veton Berisha	24	7+10	3	2	1	9+1	1	18+11	5	4	1	
22	(Serbia)	Andrija Pavlović	24	14+6	4	3+2	4	3+1		20+9	8	2		
27	(Senegal)	Aliou Badji	20	10+6	6	1+1				11+7	6	4		
29	(Austria)	Deni Alar	28	12+8	4	2+1	2	7+1		21+10	6	2		
36	(Austria)	Kelvin Arase	19	1						1				
43	(Switzerland)	Jérémy Guillemenot	20	1+2		0+1		0+1		1+4				
97	(Romania)	Andrei Ivan	21	15+9	1	2+3	2	7+4		24+16	3	2	1	

=== Goal scorers ===
Name	Bundesliga	Cup	International	Total
(Austria) Christoph Knasmüllner	5	2	4	11
(Austria) Thomas Murg	7	2	2	11
(Serbia) Andrija Pavlović	4	4		8
(Austria) Mario Sonnleitner	5		2	7
(Austria) Deni Alar	4	2		6
(Senegal) Aliou Badji	6			6
(Austria) Stefan Schwab	4		2	6
(Norway) Veton Berisha	3	1	1	5
(Austria) Maximilian Hofmann	1	2		3
(Romania) Andrei Ivan	1	2		3
(Austria) Philipp Schobesberger	2		1	3
(Belgium) Boli Bolingoli	2			2
(Austria) Christopher Dibon	2			2
(Austria) Dejan Ljubicic	1		1	2
(Turkey) Mert Müldür			1	1
(Austria) Marvin Potzmann	1			1
Own goals
(Austria) Michael Huber (Hartberg)	1			1
(Austria) Thomas Rotter (Hartberg)	1			1
(Austria) Lukas Spendlhofer (Sturm)	1			1
(Austria) René Swete (Hartberg)	1			1
(Russia) Artyom Timofeyev (Spartak Moscow)			1	1
Totals	52	15	15	82

=== Disciplinary record ===
Name	Bundesliga			Cup			International			Total		
Name	Yellow card	(yellow card) (red card)	Red card	Yellow card	(yellow card) (red card)	Red card	Yellow card	(yellow card) (red card)	Red card	Yellow card	(yellow card) (red card)	Red card
(Austria) Maximilian Hofmann	5			3		1	3			11		1
(Turkey) Mert Müldür	5			3			3			11		
(Belgium) Boli Bolingoli	7						2			9		
(Austria) Stefan Schwab	6						3			9		
(Austria) Manuel Martic	6						2			8		
(Austria) Marvin Potzmann	4						4			8		
(Austria) Thomas Murg	2	1		1			2			5	1	
(Austria) Mario Sonnleitner	3						3			6		
(Norway) Veton Berisha	1						3	1		4	1	
(Austria) Stephan Auer	4			1						5		
(Austria) Dejan Ljubicic	2		1				1			3		1
(Senegal) Aliou Badji	4									4		
(Croatia) Mateo Barać	2						2			4		
(Romania) Andrei Ivan		1					2			2	1	
(Austria) Deni Alar				1			1			2		
(Austria) Christopher Dibon	2									2		
(Serbia) Andrija Pavlović				1			1			2		
(Austria) Philipp Schobesberger	2									2		
(Bosnia and Herzegovina) Srđan Grahovac	1			1						1		
(Austria) Tobias Knoflach	1									1		
(Austria) Aleksandar Kostić	1									1		
(Austria) Richard Strebinger	1									1		
Totals	59	2	1	10		1	32	1		101	3	2

=== Transfers ===
==== In ====
Pos.	Nat.	Name	Age	Moved from	Type	Transfer Window	Contract ends	Ref.
FW	(Serbia)	Andrija Pavlović	24	(Denmark) F.C. Copenhagen	Transfer	Summer	2021	
MF	(Austria)	Philipp Malicsek	21	(Austria) SKN St. Pölten	Loan Return	Summer	2019	
GK	(Austria)	Paul Gartler	21	(Austria) Kapfenberger SV	Loan Return	Summer	2019	
DF	(Austria)	Marvin Potzmann	24	(Austria) SK Sturm Graz	Free Transfer	Summer	2021	
MF	(Austria)	Manuel Martic	22	(Austria) SKN St. Pölten	Free transfer	Summer	2020	
MF	(Austria)	Christoph Knasmüllner	26	(England) Barnsley F.C.	Transfer	Summer	2021	
FW	(Romania)	Andrei Ivan	21	(Russia) FC Krasnodar	Loan	Summer	2019	
FW	(Austria)	Deni Alar	28	(Austria) SK Sturm Graz	Transfer	Summer	2022	
DF	(Croatia)	Mateo Barać	23	(Croatia) NK Osijek	Transfer	Summer	2021	
FW	(Switzerland)	Jérémy Guillemenot	20	(Spain) FC Barcelona B	Transfer	Summer	2019	
MF	(Bosnia and Herzegovina)	Srđan Grahovac	26	(Kazakhstan) FC Astana	Transfer	Winter	2022	
FW	(Senegal)	Aliou Badji	21	(Sweden) Djurgårdens IF	Transfer	Winter	2022	

==== Out ====
Pos.	Nat.	Name	Age	Moved to	Type	Transfer Window	Ref.
MF	(Germany)	Steffen Hofmann	37		Retirement	Summer	
MF	(Austria)	Louis Schaub	23	(Germany) 1. FC Köln	Transfer	Summer	
DF	(Austria)	Mario Pavelić	24	(Croatia) HNK Rijeka	Free transfer	Summer	
MF	(Greece)	Thanos Petsos	27	(Germany) Werder Bremen	Loan return	Summer	
FW	(Brazil)	Joelinton	21	(Germany) TSG 1899 Hoffenheim	Loan return	Summer	
MF	(Austria)	Andreas Kuen	23	(Austria) SV Mattersburg	Free Transfer	Summer	
FW	(Austria)	Armin Mujakic	23	(Greece) Atromitos F.C.	Free Transfer	Summer	
DF	(Brazil)	Lucas Galvão	27	(Germany) FC Ingolstadt 04	Transfer	Summer	
FW	(Georgia (country))	Giorgi Kvilitaia	23	(Belgium) K.A.A. Gent	Transfer	Summer	
MF	(Austria)	Aleksandar Kostić	23	(Serbia) FK Radnički Niš	Free Transfer	Winter	
FW	(Switzerland)	Jérémy Guillemenot	21	(Switzerland) FC St. Gallen	Free Transfer	Winter	
MF	(Austria)	Philipp Malicsek	21	(Austria) Floridsdorfer AC	Free Transfer	Winter	
FW	(Norway)	Veton Berisha	24	(Norway) SK Brann	Transfer	Winter	
