= 2019–20 SK Rapid Wien season =

Rapid Wien
2019–20 season
- President: Michael Krammer
- Head Coach: Dietmar Kühbauer
- Stadium: Allianz Stadion, Vienna, Austria
- Bundesliga: 2nd (championship round); 3rd (regular season)
- Austrian Cup: Second round
- Top goalscorer: League: Taxiarchis Fountas (19); All: Taxiarchis Fountas (20)
- Highest home attendance: 26,100 vs. FK Austria Wien, 8 December 2019
- Lowest home attendance: 12,800 vs. SC Rheindorf Altach, 10 August 2019
- Average home league attendance: 19,200
Home colours	Away colours	Third colours

The 2019–20 SK Rapid Wien season was the 122nd season in club history.

== Pre-season and friendlies ==
Date	Opponents	Venue	Result F–A	Goalscorers		Attendance
Date	Opponents	Venue	Result F–A	Rapid Wien	Opponent	Attendance
22 June 2019	FC Klosterneuburg	A	10–0	Knasmüllner 4', Murg 15', 19', 40', Badji 29', Pavlović 58', Wunsch 60', Thurnwald 68', Bolingoli 73', 88'		1,100
25 June 2019	SV Leobendorf	A	3–0	Schobesberger 16', 79', Arase 61'		1,300
29 June 2019	Bohemians 1905	N	2–3	Schwab 58'(pen.), Knasmüllner 88'	Hronek 44', 50', Nečas 80'	
6 July 2019	FK Jablonec	N	2–1	Müldür 17', Murg 80'	Doležal 13'	400
14 July 2019	1. FC Nürnberg	H	2–1	Murg 36', Knasmüllner 80'	Margreitter 16'	12,600
16 July 2019	SC Pinkafeld	A	9–0	Knasmüllner 15', 24', 32', Fountas 55', 60', Arase 62', Murg 67', Fuchshofer 81', 85'		1,000
6 September 2019	SV Güssing	A	10–1	Barać 2', Ljubicic 25', 51', 60', Badji 29', 62', Own goal 48', Schuster 65', 70', Knasmüllner 84'	Rasser 4'	1,200
10 October 2019	Floridsdorfer AC	H	2–1	Badji 11', Knasmüllner 16'	Prosenik 26'	250
15 November 2019	BW Linz	H	2–1	Murg 51', Fountas 56'	Kostić 57'	
18 January 2020	Wr. Neustadt	A	4–1	Schuster 27', Knasmüllner 43', Ibrahimoglu 51', Grahovac 70'	Flögel 25'	1,000
25 January 2020	Floridsdorfer AC	H	2–2	Murg 50', Savić 89'	Günes 17', Sahanek 47'	300
29 January 2020	Odense BK	N	0–0			
29 January 2020	FK Vojvodina	N	0–2		Mrkaić 19', Čović 59'	
1 February 2020	Levski Sofia	N	1–2	Fountas 32'	Nascimento 78' (pen.), Raynov 90+3'	
4 February 2020	NK Maribor	N	2–0	Kitagawa 16', Fountas 82'		
8 February 2020	SV Horn	H	1–1	Arase 70'	Schwab 12' (o.g.)	250
28 May 2020	SV Horn	H	3–0	Fountas 18', Murg 26', Kara 76'		–

== Bundesliga ==
=== Bundesliga fixtures and results ===
Win Draw Loss

MD	Date – KO	Opponent	Venue	Result F–A	Attendance	Goalscorers and disciplined players		Table			Ref.
MD	Date – KO	Opponent	Venue	Result F–A	Attendance	Rapid Wien	Opponent	Pos.	Pts.	GD	Ref.
1	26 July 2019 20:45	Red Bull Salzburg	H	0–2	24,200		Minamino 35'; Okugawa 82'	9th	0	−2	
2	4 August 2019 17:00	St. Pölten	A	2–2	7,582	Fountas 39'; Müldür 47'	Ljubicic 43'; Luan 69'	9th	1	−2	
3	10 August 2019 17:00	Rheindorf Altach	H	2–1	12,800	Fountas 4' 11'	Gebauer 27'	6th	4	−1	
4	18 August 2019 17:00	Sturm Graz	A	1–0	14,532	Schwab 23'		4th	7	0	
5	24 August 2019 17:00	LASK	H	1–2	18,800	Schobesberger 47'	Raguz 23' 90+5'	6th	7	−1	
6	1 September 2019 17:00	Austria Wien	A	3–1	14,615	Murg 7'; Fountas 51'; Badji 90+4'	Monschein 10'	6th	10	+1	
7	15 September 2019 14:30	Admira Wacker Mödling	H	5–0	15,100	Schobesberger 45+1'; Barać 54'; Ullmann 64'; Badji 65'; Ljubicic 81'		4th	13	+6	
8	21 September 2019 17:00	WSG Tirol	A	2–0	5,240	Arase 54'; Barać 71'		4th	16	+8	
9	29 September 2019 17:00	Hartberg	H	3–3	15,500	Fountas 17' 72'; Schwab 90+6'	Dossou 45'; Concola 51'; Tadic 83'	4th	17	+8	
10	5 October 2019 17:00	Mattersburg	A	3–2	4,400	Fountas 45+3'; Dibon 69'; Knasmüllner 89'	Gruber 28'; Kuen 47'	4th	20	+9	
11	20 October 2019 17:00	Wolfsberger AC	H	1–1	21,200	Fountas 31'	Leitgeb 64'	4th	21	+9	
12	27 October 2019 17:00	Red Bull Salzburg	A	2–3	17,218	Knasmüllner 45+1'; Barać 87'	Szoboszlai 31' (pen.); Haaland 38'; Junuzovic 90+4'	4th	21	+8	
13	2 November 2019 17:00	St. Pölten	H	0–1	20,400		Balic 74'	4th	21	+7	
14	9 November 2019 17:00	Rheindorf Altach	A	3–0	5,104	Schwab 11' (pen.); Murg 12'; Arase 36'		4th	24	+10	
15	24 November 2019 17:00	Sturm Graz	H	1–1	19,600	Dibon 28'	Huspek 54'	4th	25	+10	
16	30 November 2019	LASK	A	4–0	6,017	Knasmüllner 34'; Fountas 67'; Filipović 84' (o.g.); Badji 90+3'	Goiginger (red card) 83'	4th	28	+14	
17	8 December 2019 17:00	Austria Wien	H	2–2	26,100	Schwab 4'; Ljubicic 69'	Sarkaria 3'; Pichler 39'	4th	29	+14	
18	14 December 2019 17:00	Admira Wacker Mödling	A	3–0	4,643	Murg 2'; Fountas 7' 57'		3rd	32	+17	
19	16 February 2020 17:00	WSG Tirol	H	2–0	22,800	Ullmann 1'; Fountas 41'		3rd	35	+19	
20	23 February 2020 14:30	Hartberg	A	2–2	5,017	Luckeneder 40' (o.g.); Kara 90+3'	Rep 45'; Luckeneder 74'	3rd	36	+19	
21	1 March 2020 17:00	Mattersburg	H	3–1	14,200	Schwab 15' 78'; Fountas 46'	Mahrer 37'	3rd	39	+21	
22	7 March 2020 17:00	Wolfsberger AC	A	2–2	5,718	Fountas 45+1'; Hofmann 90+1'	Weissman 45+3' 73'	3rd	40	+21	
Championship round
23	3 June 2020 20:30 (Note: Games postponed due to the COVID-19 pandemic)	Red Bull Salzburg	A	0–2	– (Note: No spectators due to the COVID-19 pandemic)		Daka 9'; Okafor 90+1'	4th	20 (Note: Points are halved after regular season)	+19	
24	7 June 2020 19:30	Sturm Graz	H	4–0	–	Arase 25' 28'; Schwab 70' (pen.); Fountas 78'		4th	23	+23	
25	10 June 2020 18:30	LASK	A	1–0	–	Fountas 87'		2nd	26	+24	
26	14 June 2020 17:00	Wolfsberger AC	H	2–1	–	Kitagawa 36'; Ullmann 87'	Weissman 50'	2nd	29	+25	
27	17 June 2020 18:30	Hartberg	A	1–0	–	Fountas 24'		2nd	32	+26	
28	21 June 2020 17:00	Hartberg	H	0–1	–		Tadic 42'	2nd	32	+25	
29	24 June 2020 20:30	Red Bull Salzburg	H	2–7	–	Kara 19'; Fountas 90+2'	Okafor 22'; Mwepu 30'; Szoboszlai 39'; Vallci 44'; Ramalho 60'; Junuzović 65'; Hwang 79' (pen.)	3rd	32	+20	
30	28 June 2020 19:30	Sturm Graz	A	3–2	–	Arase 51'; Schwab 83' (pen.); Kara 90'	Hierländer 34'; Kiteishvili 45+2'	2nd	35	+21	
31	1 July 2020 20:30	LASK	H	3–1	–	Andrade 4' (o.g.); Fountas 45'; Knasmüllner 90+1'	Klauss 72'	2nd	38	+23	
32	5 July 2020 17:00	Wolfsberger AC	A	1–3	–	Kitagawa 75'	Schmerböck 23'; Wernitznig 33'; Weissman 72'	2nd	38	+21	

=== League table ===
==== Regular season ====
Pos	Team	Pld	W	D	L	GF	GA	GD	Pts	Qualification
1	Red Bull Salzburg	22	14	6	2	74	26	+48	48	Qualification for the Championship round
2	LASK (Note: LASK were deducted 12 points due to violation of pandemic restrictions.)	22	17	3	2	50	20	+30	42	Qualification for the Championship round
3	Rapid Wien	22	11	7	4	47	26	+21	40	Qualification for the Championship round
4	Wolfsberger AC	22	11	5	6	50	27	+23	38	Qualification for the Championship round
5	Sturm Graz	22	9	5	8	37	28	+9	32	Qualification for the Championship round

Source: Austrian Football Bundesliga
Rules for classification: 1) Points; 2) Goal difference; 3) Goals scored; 4) Matches won; 5) Away matches won; 6) Head-to-head points; 7) Head-to-head goal difference; 8) Head-to-head goals scored.

==== Championship round ====
Pos	Team	Pld	W	D	L	GF	GA	GD	Pts	Qualification	RBS	RWI	WOL	LIN	HAR	STU
1	Red Bull Salzburg (C)	32	22	8	2	110	34	+76	50	Qualification for the Champions League play-off round	—	2–0	2–2	3–1	3–0	5–2
2	Rapid Wien	32	17	7	8	64	43	+21	38	Qualification for the Champions League second qualifying round	2–7	—	2–1	3–1	0–1	4–0
3	Wolfsberger AC	32	15	9	8	69	43	+26	35	Qualification for the Europa League group stage	0–0	3–1	—	3–3	2–4	2–0
4	LASK (Note: LASK were deducted 12 regular season points for violating regulations with concern to the coronavirus. Because point totals are halved before the championship round, this resulted in a deduction of 6 championship round points. The punishment was later reduced to 4 points.)	32	20	4	8	67	37	+30	33	Qualification for the Europa League third qualifying round	0–3	0–1	0–1	—	1–2	4–0
5	Hartberg (O)	32	12	6	14	52	74	−22	27	Qualification for the Europa League play-off final	0–6	0–1	3–3	1–5	—	1–2
6	Sturm Graz	32	10	5	17	46	60	−14	19		1–5	2–3	1–2	0–2	1–4	—

Legend: Blue = home team win; Yellow = draw; Red = away team win.
Rules for classification: 1) Points; 2) Points with (possible) half points subtracted due to rounding; 3) Goal difference; 4) Goals scored; 5) Matches won; 6) Away matches won; 7) Head-to-head points; 8) Head-to-head goal difference; 9) Head-to-head goals scored.
(C) Champions; (O) Play-off winners

=== Results summary ===
Overall								Home						Away					
Pld	W	D	L	GF	GA	GD	Pts	W	D	L	GF	GA	GD	W	D	L	GF	GA	GD
32	17	7	8	64	41	+23	58	7	4	5	31	24	+7	10	3	3	33	17	+16

== Austrian Cup ==
=== Austrian Cup fixtures and results ===
Win Loss Postponed

Round	Date	Opponent	Venue	Result F–A	Attendance	Goalscorers and disciplined players		Ref.
Round	Date	Opponent	Venue	Result F–A	Attendance	Rapid Wien	Opponent	Ref.
1st	21 July 2019 17:15	USV Allerheiligen	A	9–1	2,100	Murg 3' 73'; Hofmann 28'; Dibon 37'; Fountas 54'; Knasmüllner 63'; Schwab 67'; Barać 88'; Arase 90+2'	Bernsteiner 80'	
2nd	25 September 2019 20:45	RB Salzburg	H	1–2 (a.e.t.)	20,400	Kitagawa 56'; Schwab (red card) 66'; Velimirovic (red card) 90+3'	Szoboszlai 51'; Minamino 120+1'	

== Team record ==
Competition	First match	Last match	Record							
Competition	First match	Last match	M	W	D	L	GF	GA	GD	Win %
Bundesliga	26 July	5 July	32	17	7	8	64	43	+21	53.13
ÖFB Cup	21 July	25 September	2	1	0	1	10	3	+7	50.00
Total			34	18	7	9	74	46	+28	52.94

== Squad ==
=== Squad statistics ===
No.	Nat.	Name	Age	League		Austrian Cup		Total		Discipline		
No.	Nat.	Name	Age	Apps	Goals	Apps	Goals	Apps	Goals	Yellow card	(yellow card) (red card)	Red card
Goalkeepers
1	(Austria)	Richard Strebinger	26	20		2		22		1		
21	(Austria)	Tobias Knoflach	25	10+2				10+2				
25	(Austria)	Paul Gartler	22	2				2				
Defenders
3	(Turkey)	Mert Müldür	20	4	1			4	1	1		
4	(Croatia)	Mateo Barać	24	17+1	3	2	1	19+1	4	3		
6	(Austria)	Mario Sonnleitner	32	4+3				4+3		1		
17	(Austria)	Christopher Dibon	28	22	2	2	1	24	3	2		
20	(Austria)	Maximilian Hofmann	25	16+2	1	2	1	18+2	2	6		
22	(Montenegro)	Filip Stojković	26	19		1		20		4		
24	(Austria)	Stephan Auer	28	7+8		1+1		8+9		2		
30	(Austria)	Leo Greiml	17	9				9		3		
31	(Austria)	Maximilian Ullmann	23	31	3	1		32	3	4		
38	(North Macedonia)	Adrian Hajdari	19	0+2				0+2		1		
46	(Austria)	Paul Gobara	19	0+1				0+1				
Midfielders
8	(Austria)	Stefan Schwab	28	30	8	2	1	32	9	6	1	
10	(Austria)	Thomas Murg	24	15+5	3	1	2	16+5	5	2		
13	(Austria)	Thorsten Schick	29	9+8		1		10+8		2		
14	(Bosnia and Herzegovina)	Srđan Grahovac	26	13+6		1		14+6		4		
15	(Austria)	Manuel Martic	23	0+1				0+1				
16	(Slovenia)	Dejan Petrovič	21	9+5				9+5		3		
18	(Hungary)	Tamás Szántó	23									
28	(Austria)	Christoph Knasmüllner	27	24+4	4	0+1	1	24+5	5			
39	(Austria)	Dejan Ljubicic	21	21+1	2	1		22+1	2	7		
40	(Austria)	Melih Ibrahimoglu	18	0+4				0+4				
42	(Austria)	Lion Schuster	18	0+1		0+1		0+2				
47	(Austria)	Dalibor Velimirovic	18	4+2		1		5+2		1	1	
49	(Austria)	Nicholas Wunsch	18	0+1		0+1		0+2				
Forwards
7	(Austria)	Philipp Schobesberger	25	7+4	2	1+1		8+5	2			
9	(Greece)	Taxiarchis Fountas	23	24+4	19	2	1	26+4	20	5		
27	(Senegal)	Aliou Badji	21	8+7	3			8+7	3	2		
29	(Austria)	Ercan Kara	23	5+4	3			5+4	3	1		
32	(Japan)	Koya Kitagawa	22	6+13	2	1	1	7+13	3	2		
36	(Austria)	Kelvin Arase	20	15+10	5	0+2	1	15+12	6	2		
43	(Serbia)	Dragoljub Savić	18	0+1				0+1				
48	(Austria)	Yusuf Demir	16	1+5				1+5				

=== Goal scorers ===
Name	Bundesliga	Cup	Total
(Greece) Taxiarchis Fountas	19	1	20
(Austria) Stefan Schwab	8	1	9
(Austria) Kelvin Arase	5	1	6
(Austria) Christoph Knasmüllner	4	1	5
(Austria) Thomas Murg	3	2	5
(Croatia) Mateo Barać	3	1	4
(Senegal) Aliou Badji	3		3
(Austria) Christopher Dibon	2	1	3
(Austria) Ercan Kara	3		3
(Japan) Koya Kitagawa	2	1	3
(Austria) Maximilian Ullmann	3		3
(Austria) Maximilian Hofmann	1	1	2
(Austria) Dejan Ljubicic	2		2
(Austria) Philipp Schobesberger	2		2
(Turkey) Mert Müldür	1		1
Own goals
(Panama) Andrés Andrade Cedeño (LASK)	1		1
(Croatia) Petar Filipović (LASK)	1		1
(Austria) Felix Luckeneder (TSV Hartberg)	1		1
Totals	64	10	74

=== Disciplinary record ===
Name	Bundesliga			Cup			Total		
Name	Yellow card	(yellow card) (red card)	Red card	Yellow card	(yellow card) (red card)	Red card	Yellow card	(yellow card) (red card)	Red card
(Austria) Stefan Schwab	6				1		6	1	
(Austria) Dejan Ljubicic	6			1			7		
(Austria) Maximilian Hofmann	5			1			6		
(Greece) Taxiarchis Fountas	5						5		
(Bosnia and Herzegovina) Srđan Grahovac	4						4		
(Montenegro) Filip Stojković	3			1			4		
(Austria) Maximilian Ullmann	4						4		
(Croatia) Mateo Barać	2			1			3		
(Austria) Leo Greiml	3						3		
(Slovenia) Dejan Petrovič	3						3		
(Austria) Dalibor Velimirovic	1				1		1	1	
(Austria) Kelvin Arase	2						2		
(Austria) Stephan Auer	2						2		
(Senegal) Aliou Badji	2						2		
(Austria) Christopher Dibon	2						2		
(Japan) Koya Kitagawa	2						2		
(Austria) Thomas Murg	2						2		
(Austria) Thorsten Schick	2						2		
(North Macedonia) Adrian Hajdari	1						1		
(Austria) Ercan Kara	1						1		
(Turkey) Mert Müldür	1						1		
(Austria) Mario Sonnleitner	1						1		
(Austria) Richard Strebinger	1						1		
Totals	60			4	2		64	2	

=== Transfers ===
==== In ====
Pos.	Nat.	Name	Age	Moved from	Type	Transfer Window	Contract ends	Ref.
FW	(Greece)	Taxiarchis Fountas	23	(Austria) SKN St. Pölten	Free Transfer	Summer	2022	
MF	(Austria)	Thorsten Schick	29	(Switzerland) BSC Young Boys	Free Transfer	Summer	2022	
DF	(Austria)	Maximilian Ullmann	23	(Austria) LASK	Transfer	Summer	2022	
FW	(Japan)	Koya Kitagawa	23	(Japan) Shimizu S-Pulse	Transfer	Summer	2023	
DF	(Montenegro)	Filip Stojković	26	(Serbia) Red Star Belgrade	Transfer	Summer	2022	
FW	(Austria)	Ercan Kara	24	(Austria) SV Horn	Transfer	Winter	2022	
MF	(Slovenia)	Dejan Petrovič	22	(Slovenia) NK Aluminij	Transfer	Winter	2023	

==== Out ====
Pos.	Nat.	Name	Age	Moved to	Type	Transfer Window	Ref.
FW	(Romania)	Andrei Ivan	22	(Russia) FC Krasnodar	Loan return	Summer	
FW	(Austria)	Deni Alar	29	(Bulgaria) PFC Levski Sofia	Loan	Summer	
MF	(Croatia)	Ivan Močinić	26	(Croatia) NK Istra 1961	Free transfer	Summer	
DF	(Austria)	Patrick Obermüller	20	(Austria) TSV Hartberg	Loan	Summer	
DF	(Belgium)	Boli Bolingoli	24	(Scotland) Celtic F.C.	Transfer	Summer	
FW	(Serbia)	Andrija Pavlović	25	(Cyprus) APOEL FC	Loan	Summer	
DF	(Austria)	Manuel Thurnwald	21	(Austria) SC Rheindorf Altach	Transfer	Summer	
FW	(Austria)	Kelvin Arase	20	(Austria) SV Ried	Loan	Summer	
DF	(Austria)	Marvin Potzmann	25	(Austria) LASK	Transfer	Summer	
DF	(Turkey)	Mert Müldür	20	(Italy) U.S. Sassuolo Calcio	Transfer	Summer	
FW	(Senegal)	Aliou Badji	22	(Egypt) Al Ahly SC	Transfer	Winter	
MF	(Austria)	Manuel Martic	24	(Croatia) NK Inter Zaprešić	Transfer	Winter	
