= Obermueller =

Obermueller or Obermüller is a surname. Notable people with the surname include:

- Beni Obermüller (1930–2005), German alpine skier
- Georg Obermüller (1915–????), Austrian sailor
- Horst Obermüller, Austrian sailor
- Jerry Obermueller (born 1947), American politician
- Karola Obermueller (born 1977), German composer and teacher
- Mike Obermueller (born 1973), American lawyer and politician
- Patrick Obermüller (born 1999), Austrian footballer
- Wes Obermueller (born 1976), American baseball player
