= Stefan Schwab =

Austrian footballer (born 1990)

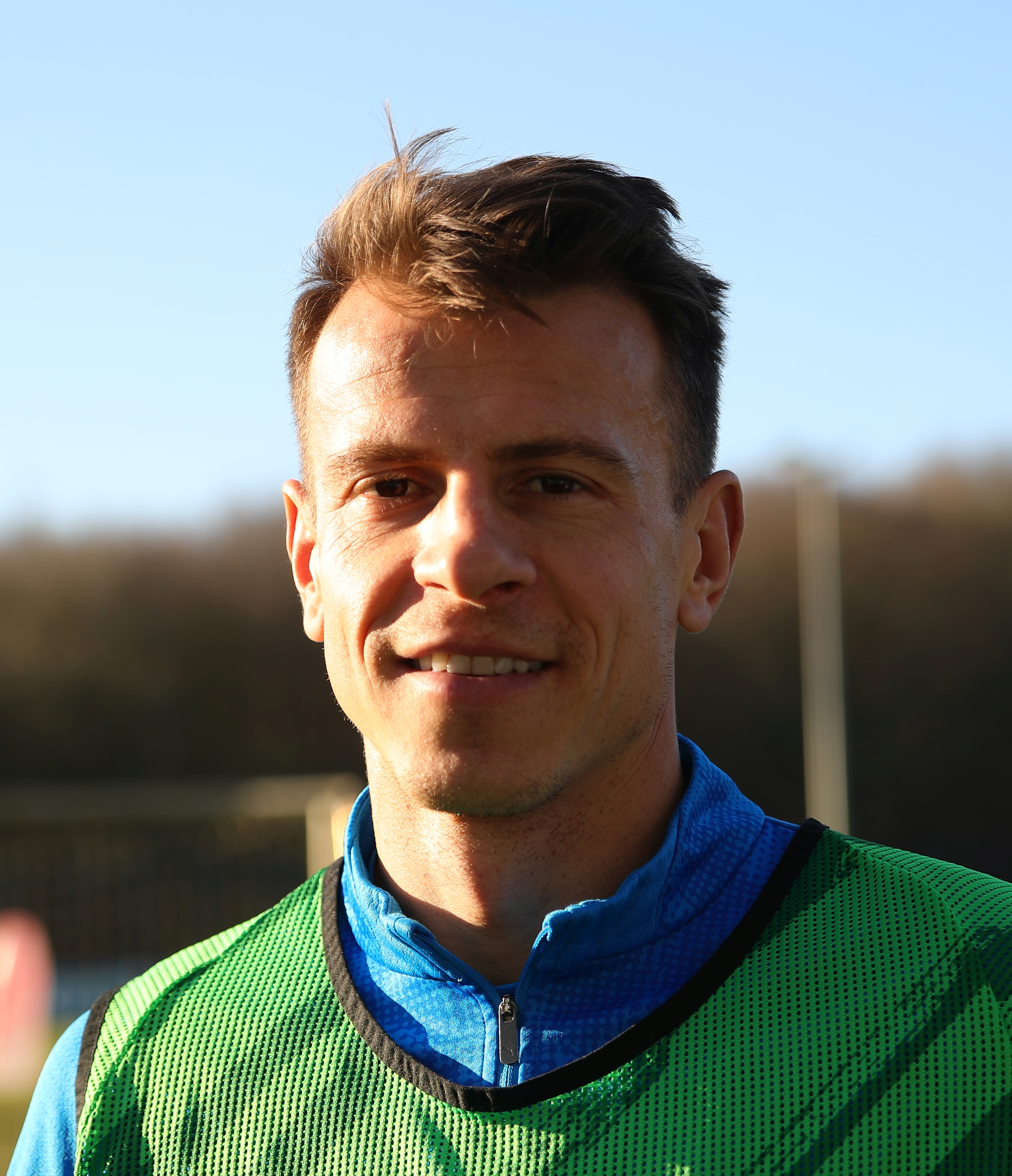
- Schwab in 2026

Personal information
- Date of birth: 27 September 1990 (age 36)
- Place of birth: Saalfelden, Austria
- Height: 1.83 m (6 ft 0 in)
- Position: Midfielder

Team information
- Current team: SV Ried
- Number: 22

Youth career
- 2000–2004: 1. Saalfeldner SK
- 2004–2009: Red Bull Salzburg

Senior career*
Years	Team	Apps	(Gls)
2009–2011	Red Bull Salzburg	0	(0)
2010–2011	→ Lustenau (loan)	21	(6)
2011	→ Admira Wacker (loan)	12	(4)
2011–2014	Admira Wacker	90	(15)
2014–2020	Rapid Wien	186	(41)
2020–2025	PAOK	158	(23)
2025–2026	Holstein Kiel	24	(0)
2026–	SV Ried	0	(0)

International career^{‡}
2009	Austria U19	1	(0)
2009	Austria U20	2	(0)
2010–2012	Austria U21	17	(0)
2017	Austria	1	(0)
- * Club domestic league appearances and goals as of 18 May 2026 ‡ National team caps and goals as of 14 November 2017

Stefan Schwab (German pronunciation: [ˈʃtɛfan ˈʃvaːp] or [-faːn-]; born 27 September 1990) is an Austrian professional footballer who plays as a midfielder for SV Ried.

== Club career ==
=== Early career ===
Swab was born in Saalfenten on 27 September 1990. From an early age he enjoyed sports, and, in addition to football, he was involved in biathlon, skiing, and ski jumping. His love for football prevailed, and at the age of 13 he decided to dedicate himself there entirely.

=== Red Bull Salzburg and Lustenau ===
Initially in the local team and from the age of 14 at the Salzburg Academies, where he stayed from 2004 to 2011, reaching in 2009 the Second Team with which he played in the second division of the Austrian Football Bundesliga, while he also participated in training sessions of the first team. In 2010 he was loaned to Lustenau and counted 24 appearances, six goals and seven assists. He returned but did not stay long, as he left with a new loan for Admira Wacker, with whom he celebrated his rise in the big category.

=== Admira Wacker ===
Admira Wacker activated the purchase option entered into the loan agreement and Swab moved there permanently. He stayed at the club until 2014 and took a leading role from the beginning and many responsibilities within the four lines. He played in a total of 114 games, scored 20 goals, served another 14 and naturally aroused the interest of the bigger teams.

=== Rapid Wien ===
==== 2014–15 season ====
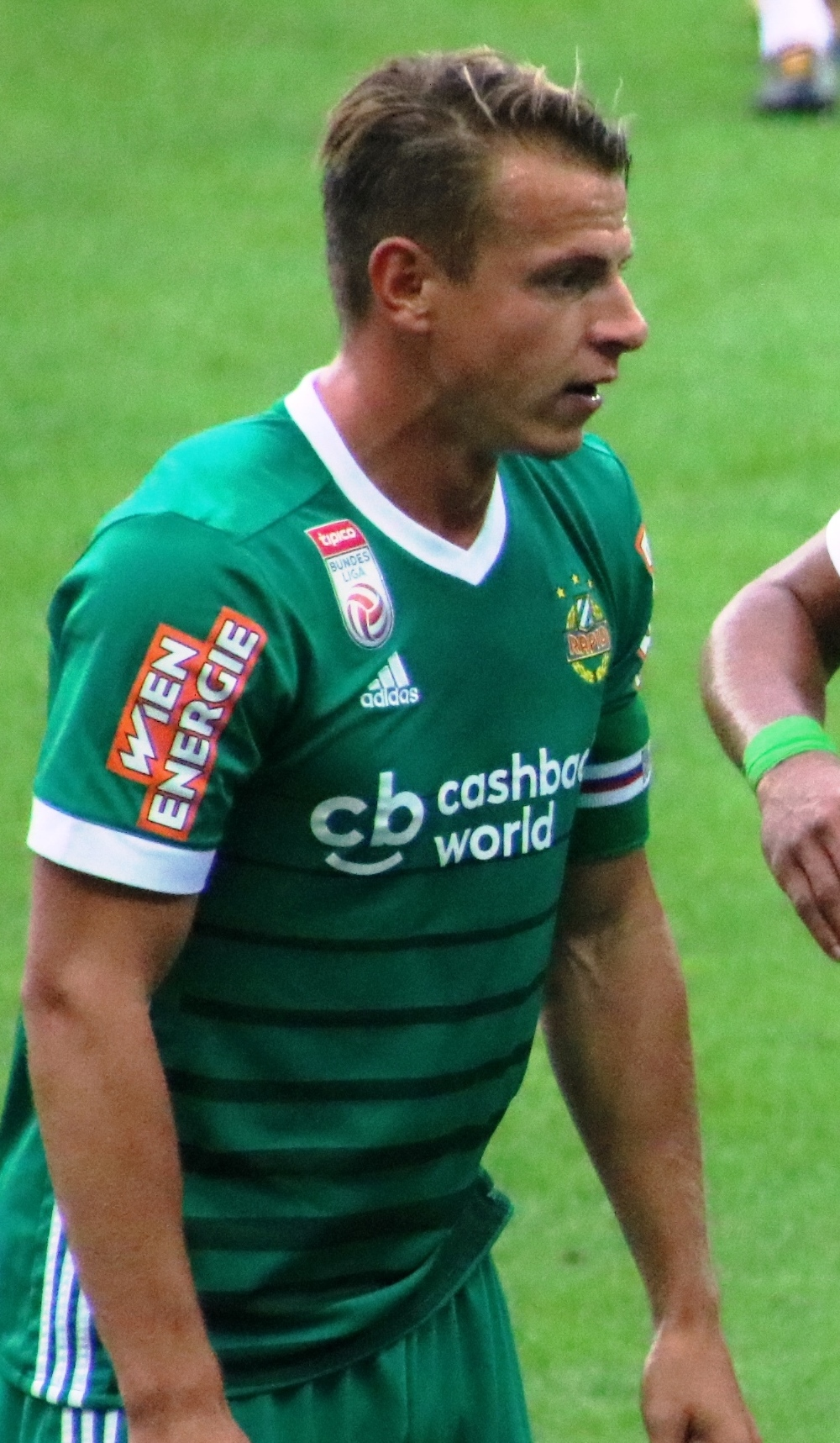
Schwab in 2017

In June 2014, Rapid Wien bought him from Admira Wacker for just 400,000 euros and finally found one of its leaders in his person for the next three years. Stefan took his place in the Starting XI from the beginning of the season alongside Thanos Petsos making a perfect match together in the midfield for the club. Schwab at age 23 made overall 36 appearances contributing five goals and seven assists. Rapid Wien finished 2nd at the end of the league behind Red Bull Salzburg and reached the quarter-finals of the Austrian Cup.

==== 2015–16 season ====
The club started its league season with six matches without losing and a with win over Ajax in Champions League Qualifying rounds. However, the next qualifier lead to a 1–0 loss against Shakhtar Donetsk in the Ernst-Happel-Stadion. In the UEFA Europa League Schwab and the Hütteldorfer reached first in the group stage and reached the stage of 32. The club then faced Valencia and lost twice leading to an early exclusion. Rapid Wien finished 2nd at the end of the league. Stefan played a total of 50 matches and contributed nine goals and six assists

==== 2016–17 season ====
After three years Zoran Barisic was no more for The Green-Whites and Mike Büskens was hired. On 7 November 2016, after a 0–1 defeat at home against Wolfsberger AC both manager Mike Büskens and Director of Football Andreas Müller were sacked. Four days later Damir Canadi was presented as the new manager, joining Rapid from league rival SCR Altach. On 11 December, Fredy Bickel was presented as the new Director of Football. On 9 April 2017, after a 0–3 defeat in Ried manager Damir Canadi was sacked and replaced by his former assistant coaches Goran Djuricin and Martin Bernhard until end of season. Djuricin was later appointed as manager for the following season. It was a tough season for Rapid overall finishing 5th in the league and 3rd in the Europa League group stage. Schwab was for one more time stable and unreplaceable for his team with 39 appearances winning coaches trust and becoming captain of the club.

==== 2017–18 season ====
New start new beginning for Rapid, Goran Djuricin making a good season finishing 3rd in the league and Stefan winning the top goalscorer award with 12 goals and 13 overall. In November 2017 Schwab was called to represent Austria on a friendly match against Uruguay playing only for a minute entering the game as a sabtitute by German coach Franco Foda.

==== 2018–19 season ====
Record season for Stefan Schwab with 50 appearances and 4291 minutes of playing time in all competitions. Great comeback in Eureapean competition entering and promoting the group stage of Europa League but losing by Inter in both Knockout games. A poor season for Goran Djuricin's club in the league, sacked after losing a game against St. Pölten by 2–0 in Allianz Stadion and replaced by Dietmar Kühbauer signing a contract for the next upcoming years.

==== 2019–20 season ====
Stefan decided not to renew his contract with Rapid to search for a new challenge in his life. For one more season Schwab was one of the main protagonists beside Taxiarchis Fountas. Schwab in Rapid excelled in domestic and European competitions. He wore the captain's armband, played in 241 games, scored 51 goals and provided as many assists and even reached the National team of his country.

=== PAOK ===
==== 2020–21 season ====
On 1 August 2020, PAOK officially announced the signing of the Austrian midfielder on two-year contract, with an option for a third year. On 5 November 2020, he scored in a 4–1 home win 2020–21 UEFA Europa League group stage game against PSV Eindhoven helping PAOK to increase the possibility of qualifying for the next phase of the UEFA Europa League. Throughout the season he was the key player in the center of the team. He played in a total of 48 games, offering 9 goals and 9 assists. In the final of the season, he celebrated the Greek Cup. PAOK faced OSFP and prevailed with a score of 2–1. Schwap played throughout the match, while he was the one who won the penalty with which PAOK opened the score.

==== 2021–22 season ====
On 12 August 2021, he scored in a crucial 2–0 home win game against Bohemian F.C., helping PAOK to qualify for the next UEFA Europa Conference League play-off round. On 9 December, he scored in a 2–0 UEFA Europa Conference League home win game against Lincoln Red Imps, sealing the qualification of the club in the phase of knockout round play-offs, for the first time in the last five years.

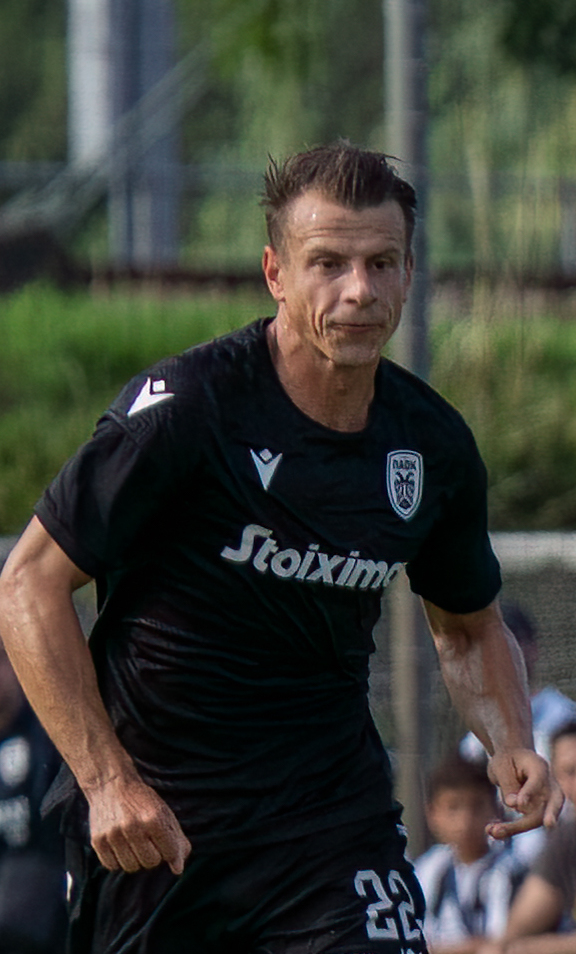
Stefan Schwab with PAOK in 2023

=== Holstein Kiel ===
On 21 June 2025, Schwab signed with 2. Bundesliga club Holstein Kiel.

=== SV Ried ===
On 25 June 2026, Schwab returned to Austria and signed with SV Ried.

== International career ==
Schwab got his first call up to the senior Austria squad for a UEFA Euro 2016 qualifier Liechtenstein in October 2015.

== Career statistics ==
As of match played 10 April 2025

Appearances and goals by club, season and competition
Club	Season	League			National cup (Note: Includes Austrian Cup, Greek Cup)		Continental		Other		Total	
Club	Season	Division	Apps	Goals	Apps	Goals	Apps	Goals	Apps	Goals	Apps	Goals
Red Bull Juniors	2008-09	Austrian First League	9	2	0	0	—				9	2
Red Bull Juniors	2009-10	Austrian First League	20	2	2	2	—				22	4
Red Bull Juniors	Total		29	4	2	2	—				31	6
Lustenau (loan)	2010-11	Austrian First League	21	6	3	0	—				24	6
Admira	2010-11	Austrian First League	12	4	0	0	—				12	4
Admira	2011-12	Austrian Bundesliga	27	4	2	0	—				29	4
Admira	2012-13	Austrian Bundesliga	33	7	2	0	4 (Note: Appearances in UEFA Europa League)	1			39	8
Admira	2013-14	Austrian Bundesliga	30	4	4	0	—				34	4
Admira	Total		102	19	8	0	4	1			114	20
Rapid Wien	2014-15	Austrian Bundesliga	30	4	4	1	2	0			36	5
Rapid Wien	2015-16	Austrian Bundesliga	36	8	4	0	10	1			50	9
Rapid Wien	2016-17	Austrian Bundesliga	27	5	5	2	7	2			39	9
Rapid Wien	2017-18	Austrian Bundesliga	31	12	3	1	—				34	13
Rapid Wien	2018-19	Austrian Bundesliga	32	4	6	0	12	2			50	6
Rapid Wien	2019-20	Austrian Bundesliga	30	8	2	1	—				32	9
Rapid Wien	Total		186	41	24	5	31	5			241	51
PAOK	2020-21	Super League Greece	24	4	6	1	9 (Note: Four appearances in UEFA Champions League, five appearances and one goal in UEFA Europa League)	1	9 (Note: Appearances in Super League Greece play-offs)	3	48	9
PAOK	2021-22	Super League Greece	24	2	5	0	14 (Note: Appearances in UEFA Europa Conference League)	2	9	1	52	5
PAOK	2022-23	Super League Greece	21	1	7	1	2	0	10	2	40	4
PAOK	2023-24	Super League Greece	23	1	6	2	15	3	10	4	54	10
PAOK	2024-25	Super League Greece	22	5	4	0	15	1	2	0	43	6
PAOK	Total		114	13	28	4	55	7	40	10	237	34
Career total			452	83	65	11	90	13	40	10	647	117

== Honours ==
Admira Wacker

- Austrian Football First League: 2010–11

PAOK

- Super League Greece: 2023–24
- Greek Cup: 2020–21

== See also ==
- List of outfield association footballers who played in goal
