= 2018–19 Austrian Football Bundesliga =

107th season of top-tier football league in Austria

Austrian Bundesliga
- Season: 2018–19
- Dates: 27 July 2018 – 26 May 2019
- Champions: Red Bull Salzburg (13th title)
- Relegated: Wacker Innsbruck
- Champions League: Red Bull Salzburg; LASK
- Europa League: Wolfsberger AC; Austria Wien; Sturm Graz
- Matches: 192
- Goals: 366 (1.91 per match)
- Top goalscorer: Mu'nas Dabbur (20 goals)

The 2018–19 Austrian Football Bundesliga was the 107th season of top-tier football in Austria. Red Bull Salzburg successfully defended last year's title.

== Changes ==
=== Structural changes ===
The league expanded from 10 to 12 teams. A new format was introduced this season, under which the league is split into a championship round and a relegation round after 22 matches.

=== Team changes ===
Wacker Innsbruck were promoted as champions of the 2017–18 Austrian Football First League and TSV Hartberg were promoted as runners-up. No teams were relegated as St. Pölten won their relegation playoff match.

== Teams ==
=== Stadia and locations ===
Location of teams in the 2018–19 Austrian Football Bundesliga

Team	Location	Venue	Capacity
Admira Wacker Mödling	Maria Enzersdorf	BSFZ-Arena	10,800
Austria Wien	Vienna	Generali Arena	17,500
LASK	Pasching	Waldstadion Pasching	7,870
Rapid Wien	Vienna	Allianz Stadion	28,000
Red Bull Salzburg	Wals-Siezenheim	Red Bull Arena	17,218 (30,188)
Rheindorf Altach	Altach	Stadion Schnabelholz	8,500
St. Pölten	Sankt Pölten	NV Arena	8,000
Sturm Graz	Graz	Merkur-Arena	15,323
SV Mattersburg	Mattersburg	Pappelstadion	17,100
TSV Hartberg	Hartberg	Stadion Hartberg	4,500
Wacker Innsbruck	Innsbruck	Tivoli-Neu	16,000
Wolfsberger AC	Wolfsberg	Lavanttal-Arena	7,300

== Regular season ==
=== League table ===
Pos	Team	Pld	W	D	L	GF	GA	GD	Pts	Qualification
1	Red Bull Salzburg	22	17	4	1	51	18	+33	55	Qualification for the Championship round
2	LASK	22	13	7	2	40	19	+21	46	Qualification for the Championship round
3	Sturm Graz	22	7	10	5	26	23	+3	31	Qualification for the Championship round
4	Wolfsberger AC	22	7	9	6	32	31	+1	30	Qualification for the Championship round
5	Austria Wien	22	9	3	10	29	28	+1	30	Qualification for the Championship round
6	St. Pölten	22	8	6	8	26	29	−3	30	Qualification for the Championship round
7	Mattersburg	22	8	5	9	28	36	−8	29	Qualification for the Relegation round
8	Rapid Wien	22	7	6	9	26	29	−3	27	Qualification for the Relegation round
9	Hartberg	22	7	5	10	35	45	−10	26	Qualification for the Relegation round
10	Admira Wacker Mödling	22	5	6	11	26	42	−16	21	Qualification for the Relegation round
11	Rheindorf Altach	22	4	6	12	30	32	−2	18	Qualification for the Relegation round
12	Wacker Innsbruck	22	4	5	13	17	34	−17	17	Qualification for the Relegation round

Source: Austrian Football Bundesliga
Rules for classification: 1) Points; 2) Goal difference; 3) Goals scored; 4) Matches won; 5) Away matches won; 6) Head-to-head points; 7) Head-to-head goal difference; 8) Head-to-head goals scored.

=== Results ===
Home \ Away	ADM	AWI	LIN	RWI	RBS	ALT	StP	STU	MAT	HAR	INN	WOL
Admira Wacker Mödling	—	1–2	0–1	0–3	2–2	2–4	3–2	2–3	0–0	2–3	3–0	0–0
Austria Wien	4–0	—	0–3	6–1	0–2	1–3	2–0	1–1	2–1	4–2	2–1	2–3
LASK	5–1	2–0	—	2–1	3–3	1–1	0–0	0–0	2–1	3–3	2–0	2–0
Rapid Wien	2–0	0–1	0–1	—	2–0	1–1	0–2	0–0	1–0	2–2	2–1	0–0
Red Bull Salzburg	3–1	2–0	3–1	2–1	—	1–0	5–1	0–0	2–1	2–0	1–1	3–0
Rheindorf Altach	0–1	2–0	1–2	2–2	2–3	—	1–2	0–2	2–3	6–1	1–2	0–1
St. Pölten	0–0	0–0	2–2	0–4	1–3	2–1	—	2–0	0–1	3–0	2–0	4–3
Sturm Graz	3–0	1–0	0–3	1–1	1–2	1–1	0–0	—	1–2	3–2	1–1	3–0
Mattersburg	2–2	2–1	1–3	2–1	0–2	1–1	2–0	1–1	—	1–2	2–1	0–6
TSV Hartberg	0–1	0–1	0–1	3–0	0–4	2–1	1–1	2–0	4–2	—	2–2	1–1
Wacker Innsbruck	1–3	0–0	1–0	0–1	0–2	1–0	0–2	2–3	0–1	2–1	—	0–0
Wolfsberger AC	2–2	1–0	1–1	3–1	1–4	0–0	1–0	1–1	2–2	3–4	3–1	—

Source: Austrian Football Bundesliga (in German)
Legend: Blue = home team win; Yellow = draw; Red = away team win.
For upcoming matches, an "a" indicates there is an article about the rivalry between the two participants.

== Championship round ==
The points obtained during the regular season were halved (and rounded down) before the start of the playoff. As a result, the teams started with the following points before the playoff: Red Bull Salzburg 27 points, LASK 23, Sturm Graz 15, Wolfsberger AC 15, Austria Wien 15 and St. Pölten 15. The points of Red Bull Salzburg and Sturm Graz were rounded down – in the event of any ties on points at the end of the playoffs, a half point will be added for these teams.

Pos	Team	Pld	W	D	L	GF	GA	GD	Pts	Qualification	RBS	LIN	WOL	AWI	STU	STP
1	Red Bull Salzburg (C)	32	25	5	2	79	27	+52	52	Qualification for the Champions League group stage	—	2–1	3–1	5–1	3–1	7–0
2	LASK	32	18	9	5	59	31	+28	40	Qualification for the Champions League third qualifying round	0–2	—	3–0	5–2	1–2	0–0
3	Wolfsberger AC	32	12	10	10	47	47	0	31	Qualification for the Europa League group stage	2–1	0–3	—	1–1	2–1	4–0
4	Austria Wien	32	12	6	14	45	48	−3	27	Qualification for the Europa League third qualifying round	1–2	2–2	2–0	—	0–1	2–2
5	Sturm Graz (O)	32	10	10	12	37	40	−3	24	Qualification for the Europa League play-off final	1–2	2–3	1–2	1–3	—	0–1
6	St. Pölten	32	9	9	14	32	50	−18	21		1–1	0–1	1–3	1–2	0–1	—

Source: Austrian Football Bundesliga
Rules for classification: 1) Points; 2) Points with (possible) half points subtracted due to rounding; 3) Goal difference; 4) Goals scored; 5) Matches won; 6) Away matches won; 7) Head-to-head points; 8) Head-to-head goal difference; 9) Head-to-head goals scored.
(C) Champions; (O) Play-off winners

== Relegation round ==
The points obtained during the regular season were halved (and rounded down) before the start of the playoff. As a result, the teams started with the following points before the playoff: Mattersburg 14 points, Rapid Wien 13, Hartberg 13, Admira Wacker Mödling 10, Rheindorf Altach 9 and Wacker Innsbruck 8. The points of Mattersburg, Rapid Wien, Admira Wacker Mödling and Wacker Innsbruck were rounded down – in the event of any ties on points at the end of the playoffs, a half point will be added for these teams.

Pos	Team	Pld	W	D	L	GF	GA	GD	Pts	Qualification or relegation	RWI	MAT	ALT	ADM	HAR	WKR
1	Rapid Wien	32	13	7	12	48	44	+4	32	Qualification for the Europa League play-off semi-final	—	2–1	1–2	3–0	3–4	1–0
2	Mattersburg	32	12	7	13	41	48	−7	28	Qualification for the Europa League play-off semi-final	1–0	—	0–0	1–1	3–0	3–1
3	Rheindorf Altach	32	9	10	13	48	44	+4	28		2–2	2–1	—	2–2	3–1	1–4
4	Admira Wacker Mödling	32	8	9	15	42	62	−20	22		3–4	0–2	1–1	—	2–3	3–2
5	Hartberg	32	10	5	17	48	66	−18	22		2–4	2–1	0–1	3–1	—	0–2
6	Wacker Innsbruck (R)	32	8	5	19	32	51	−19	20	Relegation to Austrian Football Second League	0–2	4–0	0–4	1–3	1–0	—

Source: Austrian Football Bundesliga
Rules for classification: 1) Points; 2) Points with (possible) half points subtracted due to rounding; 3) Goal difference; 4) Goals scored; 5) Matches won; 6) Away matches won; 7) Head-to-head points; 8) Head-to-head goal difference; 9) Head-to-head goals scored.
(R) Relegated

== Europa League play-offs ==
The winner and the runner-up of the relegation round played a one-legged play-off semi-final match against each other. The winner played a two-legged final against the fifth-placed team from the championship round to determine the third Europa League participant.

=== Semi-final ===
28 May 2019
19:00

Rapid Wien	2–0	Mattersburg
Knasmüllner 8'; Badji 13'	Report

Allianz Stadion, Vienna
Attendance: 10,600
Referee: Rene Eisner

=== Final ===
30 May 2019
17:00

Rapid Wien	1–2	Sturm Graz
Schwab 60'	Report	Jantscher 69' (pen.); Greiml 78' (o.g.)

Allianz Stadion, Vienna
Attendance: 15,800
Referee: Oliver Drachta
2 June 2019
17:00

Sturm Graz	0–1	Rapid Wien
	Report	Spendlhofer 43' (o.g.)

Merkur-Arena, Graz
Attendance: 9,315
Referee: Robert Schorgenhofer

== Statistics ==
=== Top scorers ===
Rank	Player	Club	Goals
1	(Israel) Mu'nas Dabbur	Red Bull Salzburg	20
2	(Brazil) João Victor	LASK	13
3	(Austria) Michael Liendl	Wolfsberger AC	11
4	(Bosnia and Herzegovina) Smail Prevljak	Red Bull Salzburg	10
5	(Austria) René Gartler	St. Pölten	9
6	(Austria) Alexander Grünwald	FK Austria Wien	8
6	(Austria) Hannes Wolf	Red Bull Salzburg	8
8	(Norway) Fredrik Gulbrandsen	Red Bull Salzburg	7
8	(Austria) Christoph Monschein	FK Austria Wien	7
8	(Slovenia) Rajko Rep	TSV Hartberg	7

== Awards ==
=== Annual awards ===
Award	Winner	Club
Player of the Year	(Israel) Munas Dabbur	Red Bull Salzburg
Top goalscorer	(Israel) Munas Dabbur	Red Bull Salzburg
Manager of the Year	(Germany) Marco Rose	Red Bull Salzburg
Breakthrough of the Year	(Austria) Thomas Goiginger	LASK

Team of the Year
Goalkeeper	(Austria) Cican Stanković (Red Bull Salzburg)			
Defence	(Austria) Stefan Lainer (Red Bull Salzburg)	(Brazil) Andre Ramalho (Red Bull Salzburg)	(Austria) Gernot Trauner (LASK)	(Austria) Andreas Ulmer (Red Bull Salzburg)
Midfield	(Austria) Thomas Goiginger (LASK)	(Mali) Diadie Samassékou (Red Bull Salzburg)	(Austria) Michael Liendl (Wolfsberger)	(Austria) Xaver Schlager (Red Bull Salzburg)
Attack	(Israel) Munas Dabbur (Red Bull Salzburg)		(Brazil) Joao Victor (LASK)	

== Attendances ==
No.	Club	Average attendance
1	Rapid Wien	16,483
2	Sturm Graz	10,974
3	Austria Wien	10,166
4	RB Salzburg	9,474
5	LASK	5,222
6	Wacker Innsbruck	4,189
7	Rheindorf Altach	4,133
8	Wolfsberger AC	3,664
9	St. Pölten	3,524
10	Hartberg	3,161
11	SV Mattersburg	2,801
12	Admira Wacker	2,688

== See also ==
- 2018–19 Austrian Football Second League
- 2018–19 Austrian Cup
