= Thomas Murg =

Austrian footballer

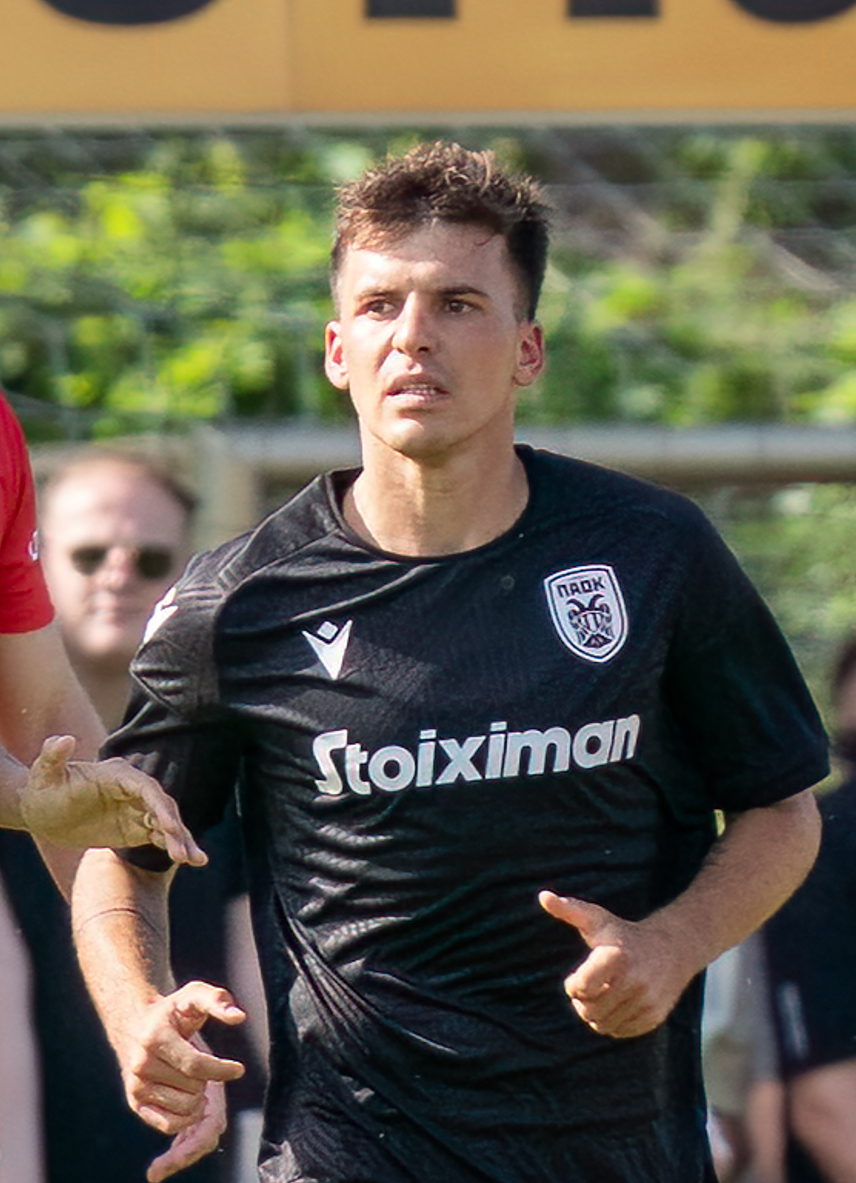
- Murg playing for PAOK in 2023

Personal information
- Date of birth: 14 November 1994 (age 31)
- Place of birth: Voitsberg, Austria
- Height: 1.74 m (5 ft 9 in)
- Positions: Attacking midfielder; right winger

Youth career
- 2005–2008: Atus Bärnbach
- 2008: Grazer AK
- 2008: Sturm Graz
- 2009–2010: Atus Bärnbach

Senior career*
Years	Team	Apps	(Gls)
2010–2012	Grazer AK	52	(13)
2012–2014	Austria Wien II	23	(13)
2012–2014	Austria Wien	19	(2)
2014–2016	Ried	40	(6)
2016–2020	Rapid Wien	122	(26)
2020–2026	PAOK	97	(15)
2025	→Al-Khaleej (loan)	16	(1)

International career^{‡}
2012	Austria U17	3	(0)
2012–2013	Austria U19	14	(9)
2014–2016	Austria U21	6	(0)
- * Club domestic league appearances and goals as of 22 May 2026 ‡ National team caps and goals as of 26 June 2016

Thomas Murg (German pronunciation: [ˈtoːmas ˈmʊɐ̯k]; born 14 November 1994) is an Austrian professional footballer who plays as an attacking midfielder or a right winger.

== Career ==
=== Early career ===
Murg was born on 14 November 1994 in Voitsberg, and at age six he joined the youth academy at Atus Bärnbach, where he remained until 2010, moving on later to Sturm Graz.

=== Grazer and Austria Wien ===
Murg moved on to Grazer AK, where he made his professional debut in 2010. He stayed at the club for two years, making 49 appearances and scoring 13 goals in the Austrian lower divisions, before then making a big step up and joining Austria Wien.

There he made 19 appearances and scored two goals, playing for both the reserve and first teams, while he also won a league title in the 2012–13 season.

=== SV Ried ===
In 2014 Murg moved on to SV Ried, where his career took off. In two seasons at the club, he chalked up 44 games, eight goals, and six assists, establishing himself as one of the league's best attacking midfielders.

=== Rapid Wien ===
In January 2016 Rapid Wien signed Murg. He immediately took on a leading role in the team and has played a major part in the team's rise to prominence in recent years.

Overall, Murg made 163 appearances in a Rapid shirt, scoring 35 goals and contributing another 40 assists.

=== PAOK ===
On 5 October 2020, Murg signed a four-year contract with Greek Super League club PAOK for an estimated fee of €2.2 million. In his first year for the club, he played in 35 games with 4 goals and 3 assists. His contribution in the first semi-final of the cup, against AEK Athens, which PAOK won 1–0. The team of Thessaloniki qualified for the final, after beating AEK in the second semifinal with 2–1. With PAOK, Murg finally celebrated the Greek Cup for 2020-2021. In the final, PAOK faced OSFP and prevailed with a score of 2–1.

==== Al-Khaleej (loan) ====
On 30 January 2025, Murg joined Al-Khaleej on a six-month loan.

== Career statistics ==
=== Club ===
As of match played 17 February 2025

Appearances and goals by club, season and competition
Club	Season	League			National cup (Note: Includes Austrian Cup, Greek Football Cup)		Europe		Total	
Club	Season	Division	Apps	Goals	Apps	Goals	Apps	Goals	Apps	Goals
Austria Wien	2012–13	Austrian Bundesliga	7	0	0	0	—		7	0
Austria Wien	2013–14	Austrian Bundesliga	12	2	1	0	6 (Note: Appearances in UEFA Champions League)	0	19	2
Austria Wien	Total		19	2	1	0	6	0	26	2
Ried	2014–15	Austrian Bundesliga	29	3	2	0	—		31	3
Ried	2015–16	Austrian Bundesliga	11	3	2	2	—		13	5
Ried	Total		40	6	4	2	—		44	8
Rapid Wien	2015–16	Austrian Bundesliga	7	1	1	0	2	0	10	1
Rapid Wien	2016–17	Austrian Bundesliga	26	3	6	2	7 (Note: Appearances in UEFA Europa League)	0	39	5
Rapid Wien	2017–18	Austrian Bundesliga	33	10	5	1	—		38	11
Rapid Wien	2018–19	Austrian Bundesliga	32	7	5	2	11	2	48	11
Rapid Wien	2019–20	Austrian Bundesliga	20	3	1	2	—		21	5
Rapid Wien	2020–21	Austrian Bundesliga	4	2	1	0	2	0	7	2
Rapid Wien	Total		122	26	19	7	22	2	163	35
PAOK	2020–21	Super League Greece	24	2	5	1	6	1	35	4
PAOK	2021–22	Super League Greece	25	4	4	0	12 (Note: Appearances in UEFA Europa Conference League)	1	41	5
PAOK	2022–23	Super League Greece	4	0	1	0	—		5	0
PAOK	2023–24	Super League Greece	30	8	5	0	11	1	46	9
PAOK	2024–25	Super League Greece	14	1	2	1	6 (Note: Four appearances and one goal in UEFA Champions League, two appearances in UEFA Europa League)	1	22	3
PAOK	Total		97	15	17	2	35	4	149	21
Career total			278	49	41	11	63	6	382	66

== Honours ==
Grazer AK

- Austrian Regionalliga Central: 2011–12

Austria Wien

- Austrian Bundesliga: 2012–13

PAOK

- Super League Greece: 2023–24
- Greek Cup: 2020–21
