= Christoph Knasmüllner =

Austrian footballer (born 1992)

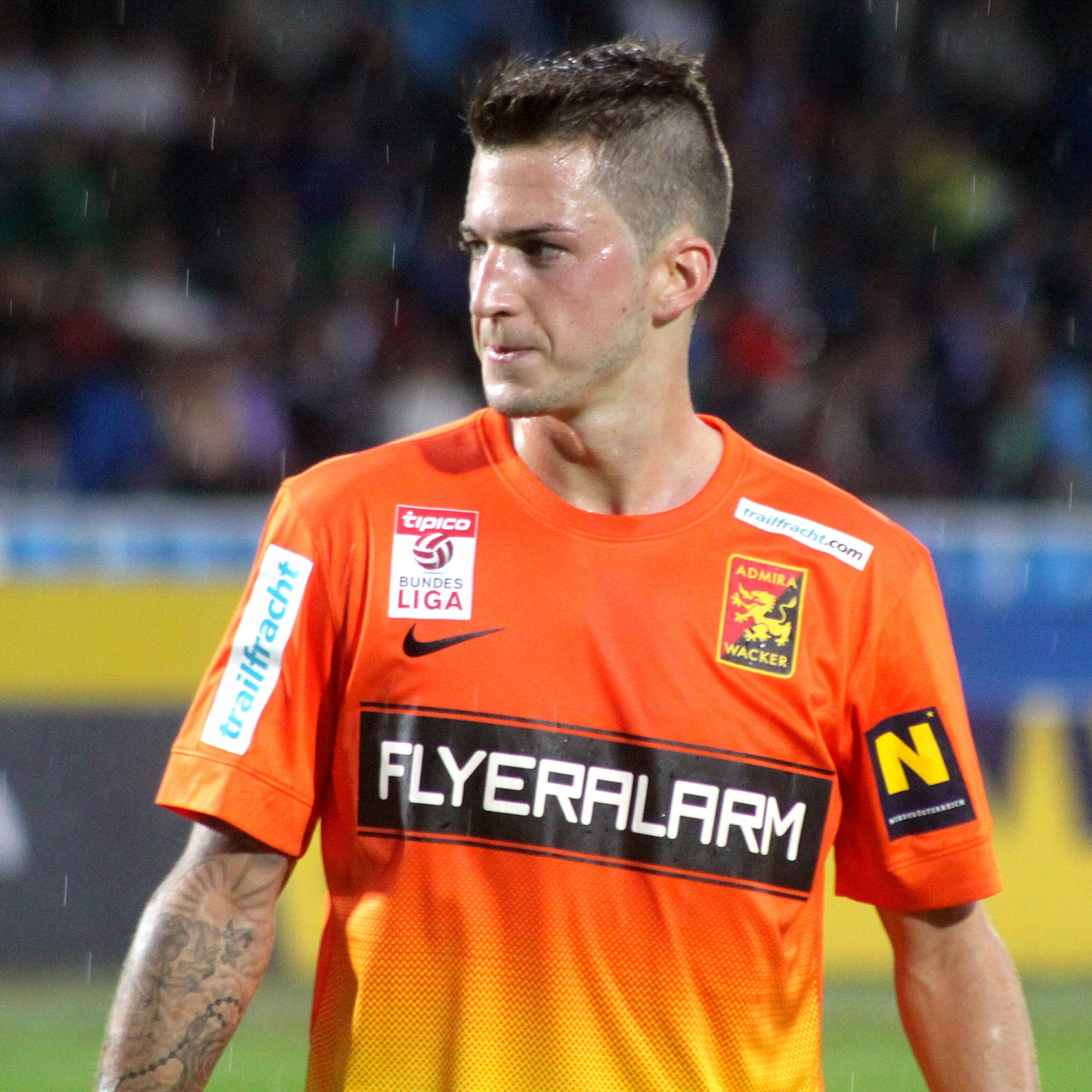
- Christoph Knasmüllner (2014)

Personal information
- Full name: Christoph Knasmüllner
- Date of birth: 30 April 1992 (age 34)
- Place of birth: Vienna, Austria
- Height: 1.81 m (5 ft 11 in)
- Position: Attacking midfielder

Youth career
- 1999–2002: FC Stadlau
- 2002–2008: FK Austria Wien
- 2006–2008: FSA Austria Wien
- 2008–2009: Bayern Munich

Senior career*
Years	Team	Apps	(Gls)
2009–2011	Bayern Munich II	38	(15)
2011	Internazionale	0	(0)
2011–2014	FC Ingolstadt 04	20	(2)
2014–2018	Admira Wacker	89	(24)
2018	Barnsley	3	(0)
2018–2023	Rapid Wien	127	(24)
2023–2024	Wieczysta Kraków	10	(4)
2025	Admira Wacker	11	(1)
2025	Stripfing	12	(3)

International career
2007	Austria U16	1	(0)
2007–2009	Austria U17	17	(8)
2009	Austria U18	2	(0)
2010	Austria U19	8	(5)
- * Club domestic league appearances and goals as of 1 January 2026

Christoph Knasmüllner (born 30 April 1992) is an Austrian professional footballer who plays as an attacking midfielder.

== Career ==
He began his career with Austria Wien and played for the reserves, making his debut 1–3 loss against AKA Austria Kärnten and scored his first goal. He scored his second goal in FSA Austria Wien's 5–0 win against Fußballakademie Linz. In the 2007–08 season, he played 12 games for the reserve team and scored five goals.

In July 2008, he moved to Bayern Munich Under-17. He made his debut in a 3–1 win against Eintracht Frankfurt U17 and scored his first goal. He scored his second goal in the second match. He made his debut for Bayern's Under 19 team in their 8–0 win against SSV Jahn Regensburg U19.

In November 2009, a number of suspensions caused Knasmüllner to be called up to Bayern's reserve team, and he made his debut in a 3. Liga match against Eintracht Braunschweig. He immediately became a regular at that level and was named in Bayern's first-team squad for the 2010–11 UEFA Champions League, where he was given the number 29, and was named on the substitutes' bench for a Bundesliga match against Hannover 96 in October 2010. He moved to Internazionale in January 2011 to play for their Primavera team. After half a season without appearance in the first squad, he moved on 31 August 2011 to Ingolstadt in the 2. Bundesliga. Three years later he returned to Austria, signing for Admira Wacker.

On 31 January 2018, he signed for Barnsley on a 2 1/2-year deal for an undisclosed fee. Five months later, on 15 June, he returned to Austria to sign for Rapid Wien.

On 30 August 2023, Knasmüllner signed a two-year deal with Polish III liga club Wieczysta Kraków. After appearing sporadically throughout the 2023–24 season, he left the club by mutual consent on 2 August 2024.

== Career statistics ==
=== Club ===
As of 9 June 2024

Appearances and goals by club, season and competition
Club	Season	League			Cup		Continental		Other		Total	
Club	Season	Division	Apps	Goals	Apps	Goals	Apps	Goals	Apps	Goals	Apps	Goals
Ingolstadt	2011–12	2. Bundesliga	5	2	1	0	—		—		6	2
Ingolstadt	2012–13	2. Bundesliga	7	0	0	0	—		—		7	0
Ingolstadt	2013–14	2. Bundesliga	8	0	1	0	—		—		9	0
Ingolstadt	Total		20	2	2	0	—		—		22	2
Admira Wacker	2014–15	Austrian Bundesliga	14	0	1	0	—		—		15	0
Admira Wacker	2015–16	Austrian Bundesliga	22	4	4	0	—		—		26	4
Admira Wacker	2016–17	Austrian Bundesliga	35	8	4	1	6	2	—		45	11
Admira Wacker	2017–18	Austrian Bundesliga	18	12	1	0	—		—		19	12
Admira Wacker	Total		89	24	10	1	6	2	—		105	27
Barnsley	2017–18	Championship	3	0	—		—		—		3	0
Rapid Wien	2018–19	Austrian Bundesliga	32	5	6	2	11	4	—		49	11
Rapid Wien	2019–20	Austrian Bundesliga	28	4	1	1	—		—		29	5
Rapid Wien	2020–21	Austrian Bundesliga	27	12	2	1	6	1	—		35	14
Rapid Wien	2021–22	Austrian Bundesliga	28	3	4	2	12	3	—		44	8
Rapid Wien	2022–23	Austrian Bundesliga	12	0	4	0	1	0	—		17	0
Rapid Wien	Total		127	24	17	6	30	8	0	0	174	38
Wieczysta Kraków	2023–24	III liga	10	4	1	0	—		—		11	4
Career total			249	54	30	7	36	10	0	0	315	71

== Honours ==
Wieczysta Kraków

- III liga, group IV: 2023–24
