= Goran Djuricin =

Austrian footballer and coach (born 1974)

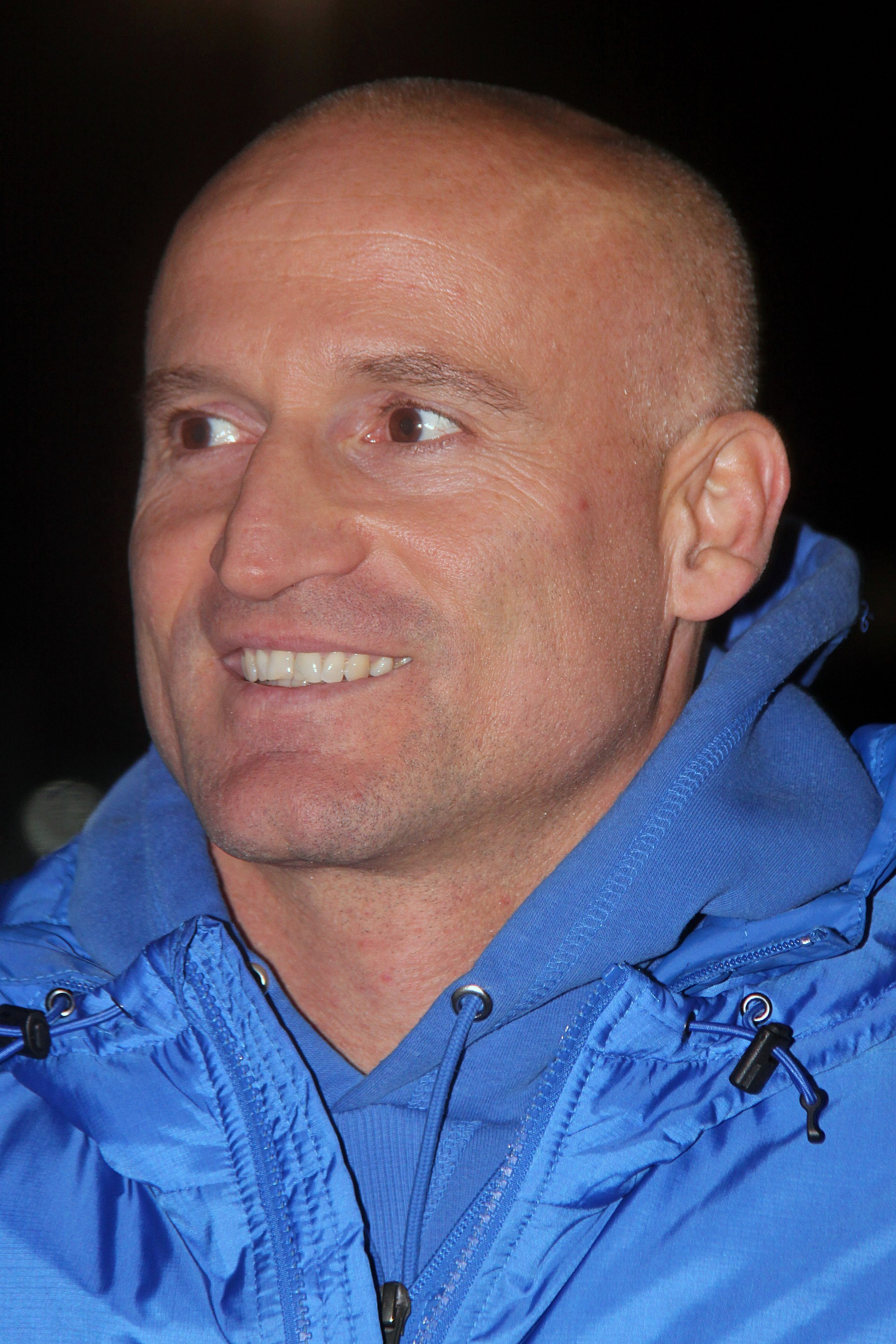
- Djuricin in 2015

Personal information
- Date of birth: 16 October 1974 (age 52)
- Place of birth: Vienna, Austria
- Height: 1.78 m (5 ft 10 in)
- Position: Forward

Youth career
- 1985–1987: PSV Wien
- 1987–1990: SV Hütteldorf
- 1990–1991: Rapid Wien
- 1991: PSV Wien

Senior career*
Years	Team	Apps	(Gls)
1991–1997	Austria Wien	10	(1)
1997–1999	SK Vorwärts Steyr		
1999–2001	Würnitz		
2001–2005	St. Andrä-Wördern		
2005–2006	Kapellerfeld		
2006–2007	SV Donau		

Managerial career
- 2002–2005: Rapid Wien U18
- 2006–2007: SC-ESV Parndorf 1919 II
- 2009–2010: IC Favoriten
- 2010–2011: Mannsdorf
- 2012: Neuaigen
- 2012–2016: ASK Ebreichsdorf
- 2017–2018: Rapid Wien
- 2019: FC Blau-Weiß Linz
- 2020: Grasshoppers
- 2022–2023: SV Stripfing/Weiden
- * Club domestic league appearances and goals

Goran Djuricin (Croatian: Goran Đuričin; Serbian: Горан Ђуричин, born 16 October 1974) is an Austrian football manager, coach and former player.

Djuricin played professionally as a forward and is best remembered for his six years with Austria Wien. As a manager, his highest-profile roles were with Rapid Wien, FC Blau-Weiß Linz and Grasshoppers. He is the father of Austrian international forward Marco Djuricin.

== Playing career ==
A forward, Djuricin joined Austrian Bundesliga side Austria Wien in 1991 and made 15 appearances and scored one goal before departing in 1997. The high points of his time with Austria Wien were a late substitute appearance in the 1994 Austrian Supercup (which was lost 2–1 to Austria Salzburg) and two 1994–95 European Cup Winners' Cup appearances versus NK Branik Maribor. He dropped into lower-league football and played for SK Vorwärts Steyr, Würnitz, St. Andrä-Wördern, Kapellerfeld and SV Donau before retiring in 2007.

== Management career ==
Djuricin has had a long career as a manager and assistant manager at club and international level. He held assistant manager positions with the Austrian U18, U19 and U20 international teams between 2008 and 2011 and was involved at the 2011 U20 World Cup. He managed ASK Ebreichsdorf between 2012 and 2016 and won the 1. Niederösterreichische Landesliga championship in the 2014–15 season, to clinch promotion to the Regionalliga Ost.

Djuricin returned to Austrian Bundesliga club Rapid Wien for the third time of his career in November 2016, as assistant manager to Damir Canadi. On 9 April 2017, he succeeded Canadi as the club's manager. Djuricin was sacked on 30 September 2018 and had to wait until April 2019 for his next role, when was appointed manager of Second League club FC Blau-Weiß Linz on a two-year contract. A run of one win from nine league games prior to the 2019–20 winter break led to Djuricin's sacking in December 2019.

On 9 February 2020, Djuricin was announced as manager of Swiss Challenge League club Grasshoppers until 30 May 2020. He won one of two league matches before the season was halted due to the COVID-19 pandemic. On 15 May and with the Swiss Challenge League having yet failed to resume, it was announced that Djuricin's contract would not be renewed. In December 2021, Djuricin was appointed as assistant to new manager Andreas Heraf at 3. Liga club Türkgücü München and continued in the role until the club's insolvency late in the season.

Following a period coaching and advising SV Gerasdorf/Stammersdorf (whom he had also served between his Grasshoppers and Türkgücü München roles), Djuricin signed a one-year contract to manage Austrian Regionalliga East club SV Stripfing/Weiden in May 2022. Despite winning the division championship, concerns over partner club Austria Wien foisting young players on the club led to his departure at the end of the 2022–23 season.

== Personal life ==
Djuricin's son, Marco Djuricin, is an Austrian international footballer. He is of Serbian and Croatian descent.

== Honours ==
ASK Ebreichsdorf

- 1. Niederösterreichische Landesliga: 2014–15

SV Stripfing/Weiden

- Austrian Regionalliga East: 2022–23
