= Michael Huber (footballer) =

Austrian footballer

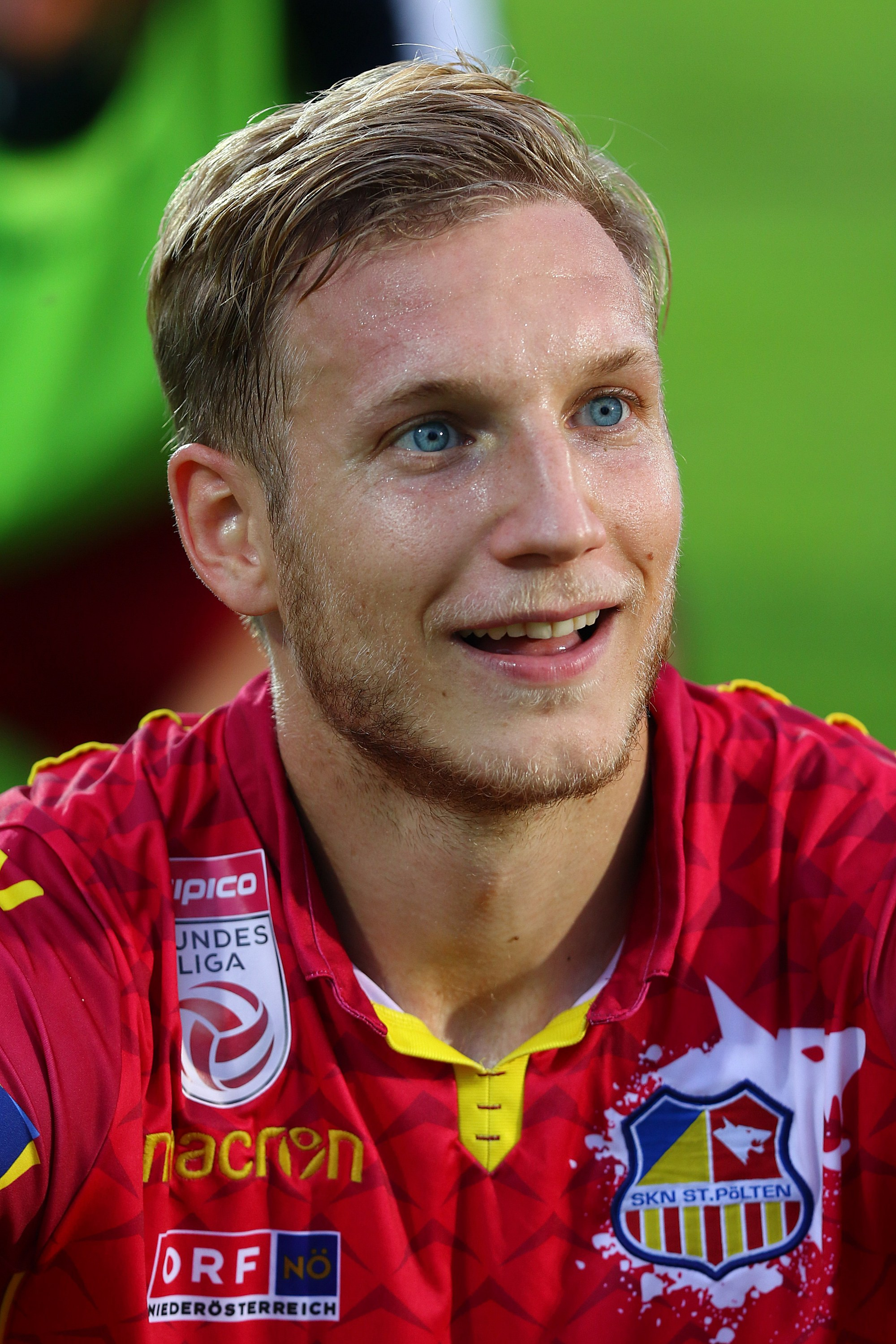

Personal information
- Date of birth: 14 January 1990 (age 36)
- Place of birth: Oberwart, Austria
- Height: 1.88 m (6 ft 2 in)
- Position: Defender

Team information
- Current team: Grazer AK
- Number: 3

Youth career
- 1999–2004: UFC Unterwart
- 2004–2008: AKA Burgenland U18

Senior career*
Years	Team	Apps	(Gls)
2008–2010	SV Stegersbach	36	(0)
2010–2011	SC-ESV Parndorf 1919	26	(0)
2011–2013	TSV Hartberg	44	(5)
2013–2018	SKN St. Pölten	158	(4)
2018–2021	TSV Hartberg	59	(3)
2021–	Grazer AK	30	(1)
- * Club domestic league appearances and goals as of 20 June 2023

Michael Huber (born 14 January 1990) is an Austrian professional footballer who plays for Grazer AK.

== Club career ==
On 15 June 2021, he signed a two-year contract with Grazer AK.
