= Dalibor Velimirovic =

Austrian footballer

Personal information
- Date of birth: 13 February 2001 (age 25)
- Place of birth: Vienna, Austria
- Height: 1.87 m (6 ft 2 in)
- Position: Central midfielder

Team information
- Current team: Rapid Wien II
- Number: 27

Youth career
- 2007–2011: Columbia Floridsdorf
- 2011–2012: Austria Wien
- 2012–2015: Columbia Floridsdorf
- 2015–2018: Rapid Wien

Senior career*
Years	Team	Apps	(Gls)
2018–2022	Rapid Wien II	38	(1)
2019–2022	Rapid Wien	6	(0)
2022–2024	First Vienna	11	(0)
2024–2025	SV Horn	28	(2)
2025–	Rapid Wien II	21	(3)

International career^{‡}
2017	Austria U16	2	(0)
2018–2019	Austria U18	7	(1)
2019–2020	Austria U19	6	(1)
- * Club domestic league appearances and goals as of 17 May 2026 ‡ National team caps and goals as of 22:02, 28 April 2022 (UTC)

Dalibor Velimirovic (born 13 February 2001) is an Austrian professional footballer who plays as a midfielder for Rapid Wien II.

== Professional career ==
Velimirovic made his professional debut with SK Rapid Wien in a 3-1 Austrian Football Bundesliga win over FK Austria Wien on 1 September 2019. On 18 October 2019, Velimirovic signed his first professional contract with Rapid Wien.
