= Adrian Hajdari =

Macedonian footballer

Personal information
- Date of birth: 31 May 2000 (age 26)
- Place of birth: Gostivar, North Macedonia
- Height: 1.72 m (5 ft 8 in)
- Position: Right back

Youth career
- 2010–2011: Donau
- 2011–2018: Rapid Wien

Senior career*
Years	Team	Apps	(Gls)
2018–2023	Rapid Wien II	70	(2)
2019–2020	Rapid Wien	2	(0)
2023–2024	SV Horn	22	(0)

International career^{‡}
2015	Macedonia U16	1	(0)
2018	Austria U19	1	(0)
2018	Macedonia U19	2	(0)
2021–2022	Macedonia U21	8	(0)
- * Club domestic league appearances and goals as of 26 May 2024 ‡ National team caps and goals as of 5 June 2022

Adrian Hajdari (Macedonian: Адриан Хајдари; born 31 May 2000) is a Macedonian professional footballer who plays as a defender.

== Professional career ==
Hajdari made his professional debut with Rapid Wien in a 2-2 Austrian Football Bundesliga tie with FK Austria Wien on 8 December 2019.

== International career ==
Born in Macedonia, Hajdari is of Albanian descent. He moved to Austria at a young age, and originally represented Macedonia internationally. He made one appearance for the Austria U18s in 2018, before switching back to represent the Macedonia U19s.
