= Aleksandar Kostić =

Austrian footballer

Personal information
- Date of birth: 12 October 1995 (age 31)
- Place of birth: Vienna, Austria
- Height: 1.66 m (5 ft 5 in)
- Position: Midfielder

Team information
- Current team: Wiener Neudorf
- Number: 8

Youth career
- 2001–2010: Rapid Wien
- 2010–2011: Slovan HAC
- 2011–2013: Wiener Sport-Club

Senior career*
Years	Team	Apps	(Gls)
2013–2015	Wiener Sport-Club	61	(9)
2015–2017	First Vienna	42	(5)
2017–2018	Rapid Wien	6	(0)
2017–2018	→ Rapid Wien II	26	(8)
2019	Radnički Niš	0	(0)
2019–2022	Blau-Weiß Linz	77	(13)
2022–2023	Admira Wacker	11	(0)
2023	Wiener Sport-Club	15	(1)
2024–	Wiener Neudorf	16	(2)
- * Club domestic league appearances and goals as of 16:18, 30 December 2024 (UTC)

Aleksandar Kostić (born 12 October 1995) is an Austrian professional footballer who plays as a midfielder for Wiener Neudorf.

== Career ==
=== Early career ===
Kostic debuted as senior in 2012 playing with Wiener Sport-Club in the Regionalliga where he stayed until 2015 when he moved to same level side First Vienna FC where he played two seasons.

=== Rapid Wien ===
Over 100 appearances in Regionalliga in 5 seasons called the attention of Austrian giants SK Rapid Wien which brought him back in summer 2017. Rapid was a club where he spent much of his youth career, between 2001 and 2010. Rapid's academy product, Kostic was this time joining the main team and made hid debut with one appearances in the 2017–18 Austrian Football Bundesliga, plus 5 in the first half of the 2018–19 Austrian Football Bundesliga. Simultaneously, he also played with the second team in the Regionalliga where he was much more active making 26 appearances and scoring 8 goals in that same period.

=== Radnički Niš ===
Despite receiving much more playing time in his second year in Rapid, both in main and second team, during winter-break of 2018–19 season Kostic moved abroad to his ancestors' country, Serbia, and signed with top-level side FK Radnički Niš. However, his move didn't go as expected, the club's coach gave preference to other options, and, after ending the season without even debuting in the Serbian SuperLiga, he departed and returned to Austria.

=== Blau-Weiß Linz ===
On 14 June 2019 FC Blau-Weiß Linz confirmed, that Kostić had joined the club on a one-year deal.

=== Admira Wacker ===
Kostić joined recently relegated 2. Liga club Admira Wacker on 13 June 2022, signing a two-year contract. He made his competitive debut for the club on 17 July in an Austrian Cup match against SVg Purgstall.
