= Nicholas Wunsch =

Austrian professional footballer

Personal information
- Date of birth: 5 October 2000 (age 26)
- Place of birth: Austria
- Height: 1.86 m (6 ft 1 in)
- Position: Midfielder

Team information
- Current team: Wiener Sport-Club
- Number: 8

Youth career
- 2006–2018: Rapid Wien

Senior career*
Years	Team	Apps	(Gls)
2018–2022	Rapid Wien II	100	(17)
2019–2020	Rapid Wien	2	(0)
2022–2024	First Vienna	34	(0)
2024–	Wiener Sport-Club	61	(20)

International career^{‡}
2015–2016	Austria U16	11	(0)
2016–2017	Austria U17	12	(1)
2017–2018	Austria U18	9	(0)
2018	Austria U19	6	(1)
2019	Austria U20	2	(0)
- * Club domestic league appearances and goals as of 28 June 2026 ‡ National team caps and goals as of 21 April 2020

Nicholas Wunsch (born 5 October 2000) is an Austrian professional footballer who plays as a midfielder for Wiener Sport-Club.

== Professional career ==
Wunsch made his professional debut with Rapid Wien in a 2-1 Austrian Football Bundesliga loss to SC Rheindorf Altach on 25 May 2019.
