= Damir Čanadi =

Austrian football manager (born 1970)

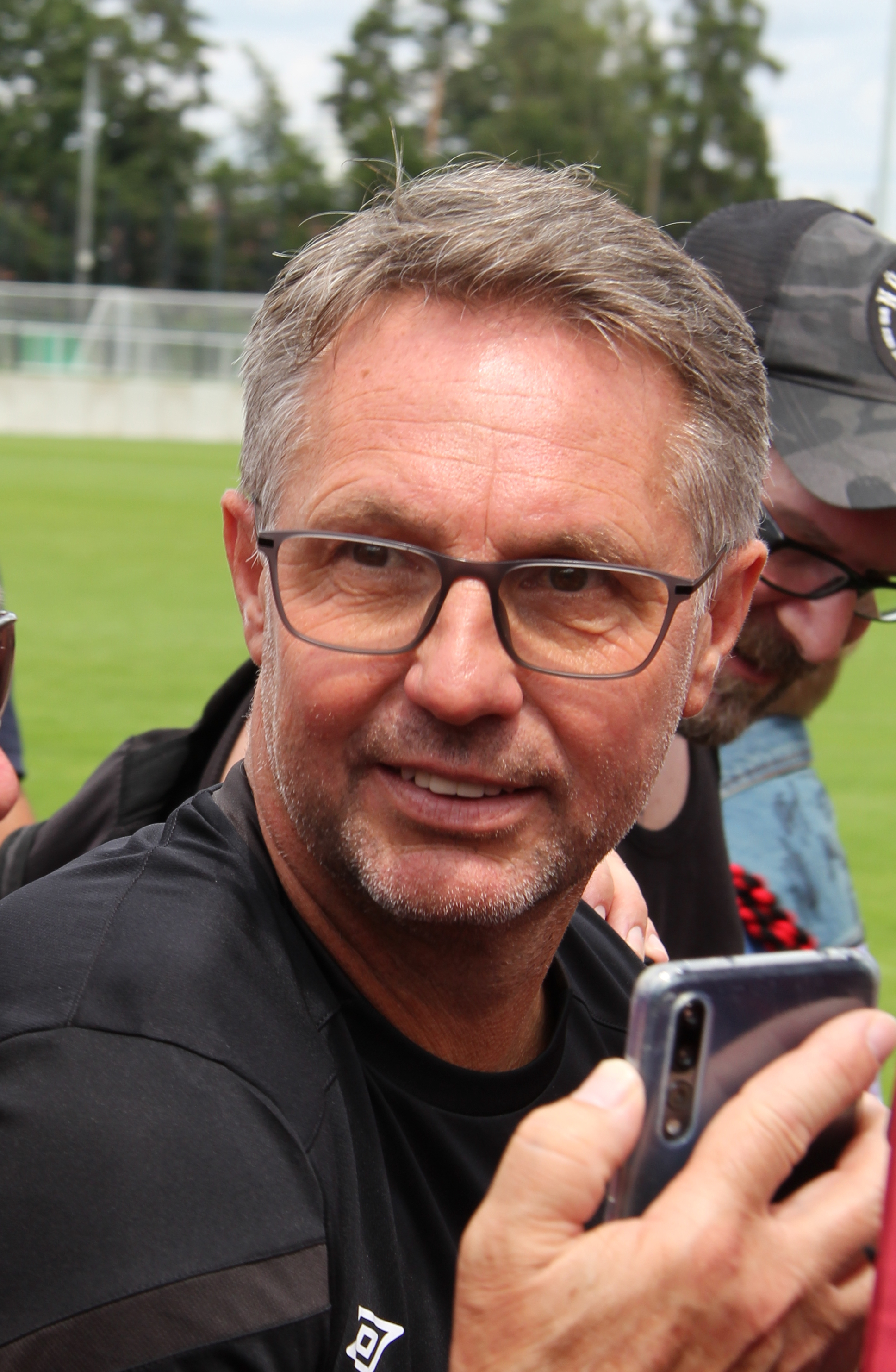
- Čanadi as 1. FC Nürnberg manager in 2019

Personal information
- Date of birth: 6 May 1970 (age 56)
- Place of birth: Vienna, Austria
- Height: 1.70 m (5 ft 7 in)
- Position: Midfielder

Team information
- Current team: Umm Salal (manager)

Senior career*
Years	Team	Apps	(Gls)
1988–1989	Austria Wien	1	(0)
1989–1993	Favoritner AC		
1993	Rheindorf Altach		
1994	SV Stockerau	1	(0)
1994–1995	VfB Mödling	18	(1)
1995	First Vienna	8	(0)
1996	Favoritner AC	6	(1)
1996–1997	Wiener Sport-Club	28	(7)
1997–1998	SV Schwechat	1	(0)
1998	SC-ESV Parndorf 1919		
1998–2000	FC Deutschkreutz	41	(13)
2000–2001	SC Zwettl	28	(7)
2001–2002	SC Leopoldsdorf		

Managerial career
- 2001–2002: SC Leopoldsdorf
- 2002–2003: Fortuna 05 Wien
- 2003–2004: SV Donau
- 2005–2007: PSV Team für Wien
- 2007–2008: FAC Team für Wien
- 2010: FAC Team für Wien (interim)
- 2010–2011: 1. Simmeringer SC
- 2011–2013: Lustenau 07
- 2013–2016: Rheindorf Altach
- 2016–2017: Rapid Wien
- 2017–2019: Atromitos
- 2019: 1. FC Nürnberg
- 2020–2021: Atromitos
- 2021: Rheindorf Altach
- 2022: Šibenik
- 2023: Šibenik
- 2024: Velež Mostar
- 2024–2026: Enosis Neon Paralimni
- 2026–: Umm Salal
- * Club domestic league appearances and goals

Damir Čanadi (born 6 May 1970) is an Austrian professional football manager and former player who is in charge of Umm Salal.

A former midfielder, he has previously managed a number of lower and top division clubs in Austria such as FAC Team für Wien, 1. Simmeringer SC, Lustenau 07, Rheindorf Altach and Rapid Wien, but also had stints in Germany and Greece with 1. FC Nürnberg and Atromitos.

== Personal life ==
Čanadi is of Croatian descent. His parents immigrated to Austria in 1967.

Čanadi's son, Marcel, is also a professional footballer.

== Managerial statistics ==
As of match played 10 August 2024

Managerial record by team and tenure
Team	From	To	Record				
Team	From	To	P	W	D	L	Win %
Lustenau 07	10 October 2011	6 January 2013	45	15	13	17	33.33
Rheindorf Altach	7 January 2013	10 November 2016	154	77	33	44	50.00
Rapid Wien	11 November 2016	9 April 2017	17	3	6	8	17.65
Atromitos	1 July 2017	30 June 2019	76	38	20	18	50.00
1. FC Nürnberg	1 July 2019	4 November 2019	14	4	5	5	28.57
Atromitos	29 July 2020	4 February 2021	22	6	8	8	27.27
Rheindorf Altach	24 February 2021	17 December 2021	33	9	8	16	27.27
Šibenik	7 June 2022	24 September 2022	10	1	7	2	10.00
Šibenik	31 January 2023	27 June 2023	20	6	2	12	30.00
Velež Mostar	27 June 2024	12 August 2024	3	0	1	2	0.00
Total			394	159	103	132	40.36

== Honours ==
=== Manager ===
Fortuna 05 Wien

- Wiener Stadtliga: 2002–03

1. Simmeringer SC

- Wiener Stadtliga: 2010–11

SC Rheindorf Altach

- Austrian Football First League: 2013–14
