= Patrick Obermüller =

Austrian footballer

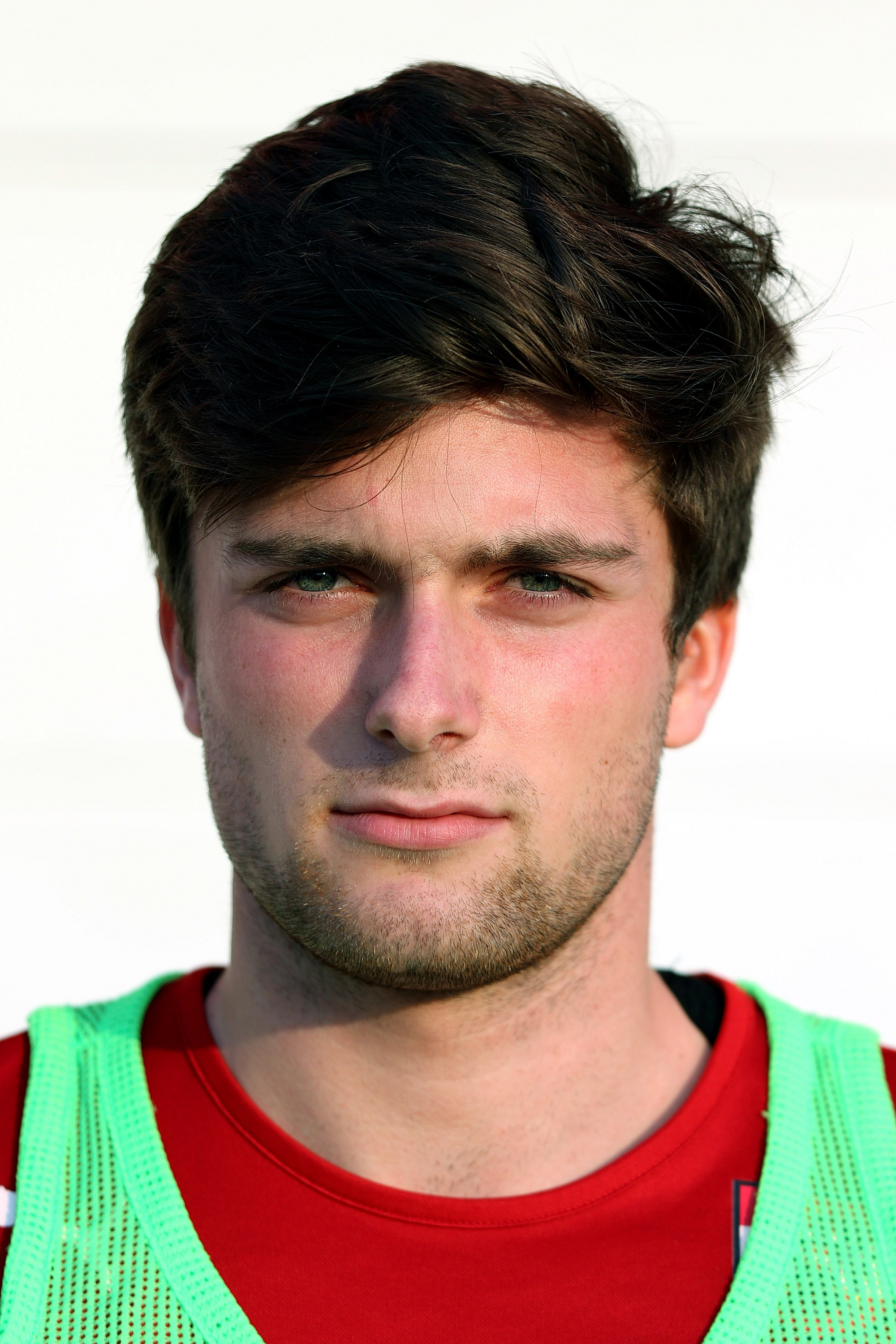

Personal information
- Date of birth: 17 February 1999 (age 27)
- Place of birth: Austria
- Height: 1.88 m (6 ft 2 in)
- Position: Centre-back

Team information
- Current team: FC Hertha Wels
- Number: 39

Youth career
- 2007–2011: SC Klosterneuburg 1912
- 2011–2018: Rapid Wien

Senior career*
Years	Team	Apps	(Gls)
2016–2021	Rapid Wien II	51	(1)
2019–2021	Rapid Wien	1	(0)
2019–2020	→ TSV Hartberg (loan)	4	(0)
2020	→ SV Ried (loan)	11	(0)
2021–2022	Admira Wacker II	25	(1)
2022–2023	ASV Drassburg	29	(1)
2023–2024	SW Bregenz	23	(0)
2024–	FC Hertha Wels	26	(1)

International career
2015	Austria U-16	5	(0)
2016–2017	Austria U-18	5	(0)
2017–2018	Austria U-19	9	(0)
2019	Austria U-20	2	(0)
- * Club domestic league appearances and goals as of 23 May 2025

Patrick Obermüller (born 17 February 1999) is an Austrian footballer who plays for Austrian Regionalliga club FC Hertha Wels.

== Club career ==
Obermüller began his career at SC Klosterneuburg 1912. For the 2011/12 season he joined the academy of Rapid Wien.

In November 2016 he made his debut for the reserve team of SK Rapid Wien in the Austrian Regionalliga when he was in the starting line-up against FCM Traiskirchen on matchday 14 of the 2016/17 season, but was sent off in the 72nd minute after receiving a second yellow card. In October 2017 he scored his first goal in the Regionalliga against FC Stadlau.

In May 2019, Obermüller made his debut for the Rapid's first team in the Austrian Football Bundesliga, when he started against SCR Altach on matchday 32 of the 2018/19 season - in the 69th minute, he was substituted for Mario Sonnleitner.

For the 2019/20 season he was loaned out to TSV Hartberg. After playing only four games for the club, he was instead loaned out to the Austrian Football Second League club SV Ried in February 2020. By the end of the loan, he made eleven appearances for Ried in the 2nd division. He helped the team with promotion to the Bundesliga in that season.

After the end of the loan, he returned to Rapid, where he was registered for the reserve team, which had been promoted to the 2nd division.

== International career ==
He has played for Austria at under-16, under-18, under-19 and under-20 levels.
