= List of magazines in Austria =

There were at least 19 Jewish magazines in Austria which were all banned after 1938. As of 2012 the magazine sector in Austria was under the dominance of Germany. This influence decreased at the end of the 1990s, but it continued on the women's magazines and fashion magazines. However, business magazines have not been subject to the dominance of Germany. The major fields of Austrian magazines are news, popular science and special interest topics. On the other hand, since the Austrian press market is divided between magazines and newspapers, magazines have a significant function in the press market.

As of 2005 Austrian media company News publishing was dominating the magazine sector in the country.

The following is an incomplete list of current and defunct magazines published in Austria. They may be published in German or in other languages.

== A ==
- Aljadidah
- Allgemeine Bauzeitung
- An.Schlaege
- Arbeit und Wirtschaf
- Die Aula
- Auto Revue
- Auto Touring

== B ==
- Biber
- Boarder's Buddy

== C ==
- CD Austria

== D ==
- Datum
- Dérive
- DUM (Das Ultimative Magazine)

== E ==
- Echo
- Egység

== F ==
- Die Fackel
- Falter
- Female Sequences
- Format
- FORVM
- Die Frau
- Freie Fahrt

== G ==
- GamingXP
- Gangway
- Die Ganze Woche
- Gewinn
- Global Player
- Gusto

== H ==
- Der Humorist

== K ==
- Der Kampf
- Kikeriki
- Der Kuckuck

== L ==
- Literatur und Kritik
- L'Officiel Austria
- Lürzer's Archive

== M ==
- Menorah
- Metropole – Vienna in English

== N ==
- Neues Frauenleben
- News

== O ==
- ORF nachlese
- Ostara
- Der Österreichische Volkswirt
- Österreichische Musikzeitschrift

== P ==
- Patent Information News
- Poetry Salzburg Review
- Profil

== R ==
- The Red Bulletin
- Resident

== S ==
- Schreibkraft
- Südwind magazine
- Skug – Journal für Musik

== T ==
- Top One
- Trend
- TV Woche

== U ==
- Universum
- Die Unzufriedene

== V ==
- Ver Sacrum
- Vienna Würstelstand

== W ==
- Weg und Ziel
- Wespennest
- Wiener
- Wiener Tagebuch
- Wiener Theaterzeitung
- Wochenpresse

== Z ==
- Zur Zeit

== See also ==
- List of newspapers in Austria
