= List of mass media in Austria =

== General ==
German magazines and (private) TV stations have affected the development of Austria since their foundation. Because German TV stations broadcast by satellite, it is possible to receive them throughout Austria as well.

== Newspapers ==
=== Broadsheet ===
- Die Presse centre-right, classical liberal
- Der Standard centre-left, social liberal
- Salzburger Nachrichten centre-right, Christian liberal
- Wiener Zeitung organ of the Republic of Austria

=== Intermediate ===
- Kurier, centre, social liberal
- Oberösterreichische Nachrichten
- Tiroler Tageszeitung
- Vorarlberger Nachrichten

=== Tabloid ===
- Kronen Zeitung populist
- Kleine Zeitung moderate, Catholic-liberal
- Österreich populist
- Heute populist [German link]

=== Historical Archive ===
- ANNO - AustriaN Newspapers Online by the Österreichische Nationalbibliothek (Austrian National Library) including online search of historical newspapers (1689–1946).

== Magazines ==
=== High brow ===
- profil current events, moderate
- Datum current events, liberal
- Gewinn finance and economics

=== Low brow ===
- News society, current events

== TV ==
- ORF eins, 2, III and Sport+, the Austrian nationwide television channels by public broadcaster ORF
- ATV, private TV channel in Austria
- Puls 4, private TV channel in Austria
- Servus TV, private TV channel in Austria
- FS1, Community TV channel in Salzburg

Austria was the second last European country (Albania was the last one) when it officially allowed other TV stations in 2003.

== Radio ==
- ORF OE1 News and documentaries
- ORF OE2 Regional Radioprogramm, featuring mostly folk- and folkish music
- ORF OE3 Pop / Rock music
- ORF FM4 Cutting-edge music channel, youth oriented
- Kronehit Private radio, Pop / Rock music
- Antenne Private radio, 1970s, 1980s and 1990s music
- Radiofabrik, Community radio in Salzburg
- Orange 94.0, Community radio in Vienna Its self-declared aim is to amplify those voices, which are ignored by the mainstream media.

Austria was the last European country where radio broadcasting was a state monopoly until 1998, when private radio stations were officially allowed.

== Online ==
- Kontrast.at (DE), social democratic political online magazine, published by SPÖ
- mokant.at (DE), independent Austrian online magazine
- ORF.at (DE), News service of the public broadcaster
- Unzensuriert.at(DE), right-wing news-magazine, published by FPÖ

== See also ==
- Open access in Austria to scholarly communication

== Bibliography ==
- Euromedia Research Group; Mary Kelly; et al., eds. (2004). "Austria". Media in Europe (3rd ed.). SAGE Publications. pp. 4–15. ISBN 978-0-7619-4132-3.
