= Russmedia =

Coordinates: 47.43984033°N 9.75601174°E

- Company type: Private (GmbH)
- Industry: Media
- Founded: July 10, 1991
- Headquarters: Schwarzach, Austria
- Area served: Austria, Germany, Hungary, Romania, United Kingdom
- Key people: Eugen Russ (managing director) Markus Raith (managing director) Georg Burtscher (managing director)
- Products: Newspapers, magazines, online portals, radio stations, telecommunications services
- Revenue: €120 million (2012)
- Number of employees: 1,500 (488 in Vorarlberg) (2013)
- Website: www.russmedia.com

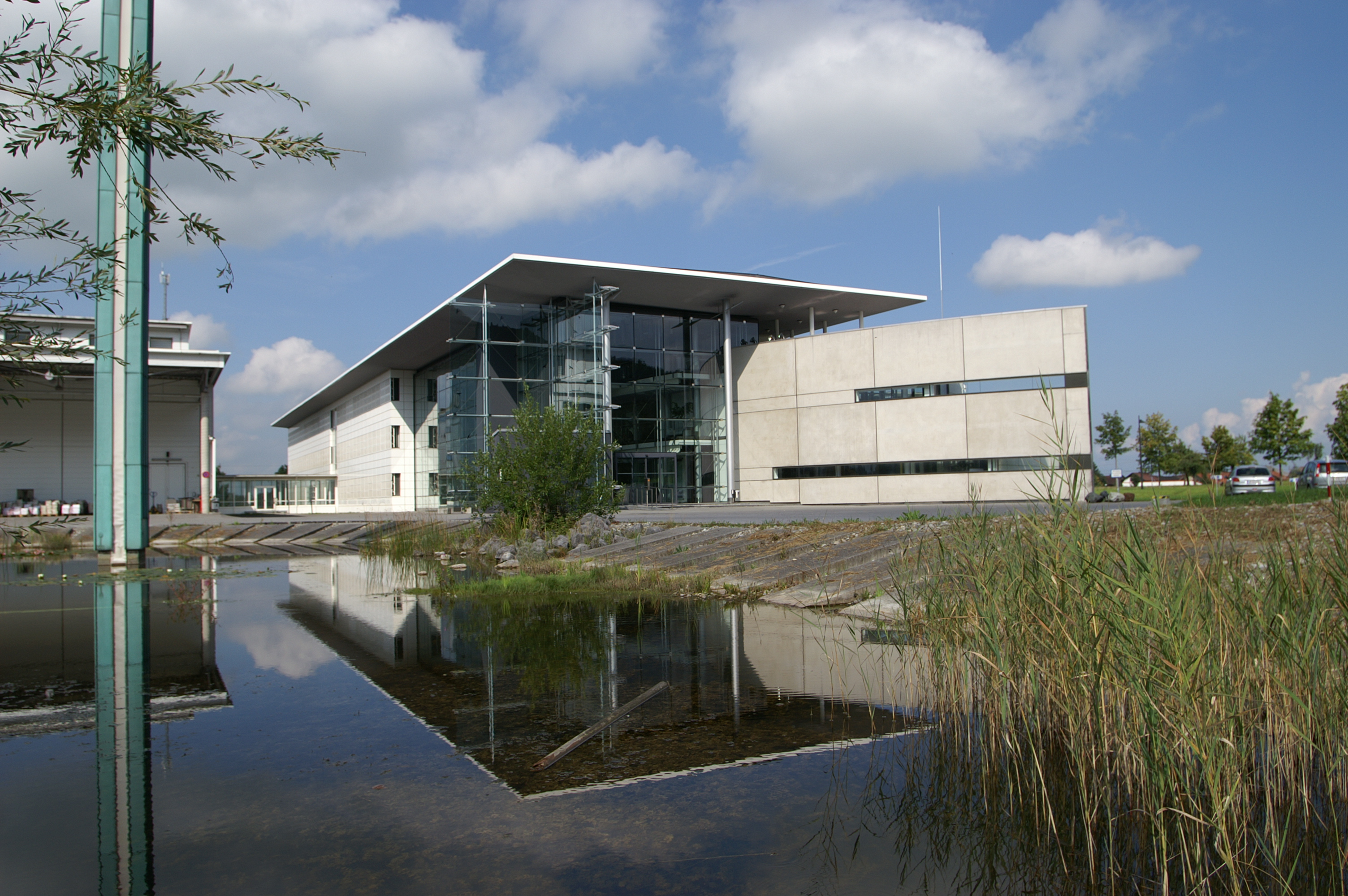
Russmedia headquarters in Schwarzach

Russmedia (until 2012 known as Vorarlberger Medienhaus) is an internationally active media company. Its roots lie in a local printing house and publishing company in Bregenz, Vorarlberg. Russmedia serves as an umbrella brand under which various media are published. The company's headquarters is located in Schwarzach. Other locations are in Vienna (Austria), Germany, Hungary, Romania, and Great Britain. According to its own information, the company employed around 1,500 people internationally in various business fields at 28 locations in 2013.

== History ==
=== The first half of the 20th century ===
On July 14, 1919, Eugen Ruß (1877–1962) acquired the printing house and thus also the publisher of the Vorarlberger Landeszeitung, the predecessor of Vorarlberger Nachrichten. The company relocated to Bregenzer Kirchstraße in 1929, where Ruß converted the former Rose Inn into a printing house. After the newspaper was banned by the National Socialists in 1938, the first independent issue of Vorarlberger Nachrichten appeared on November 16, 1945. The Ruß printing house was again publisher and distributor. Besides Eugen Ruß, his son Toni Ruß was now also active in the company as editor-in-chief.

=== 1950 to 1980 ===
In 1954, Eugen Ruß acquired the first two-color printing machine. Six years later, construction of the offset printing facility began in Lochau. On August 27, 1962, Ruß died, leaving behind the largest graphic enterprise in Vorarlberg. His son, Toni Russ, took over the company's management. After seven years at the company's helm, he died and his wife Rosa Russ became publisher, while his brother-in-law Richard Kempf became commercial director. The following year, the Toni Russ Prize was awarded for the first time.

=== 1980s ===
After Eugen A. Russ, son of Toni Russ, had already been working in the company for two years, he became managing director and editor-in-chief of Vorarlberger Nachrichten in 1983. After 65 years with one brand, a second was added in 1984 with the purchase of the weekly newspaper Wann&Wo. In 1987, Vorarlberger Nachrichten became the first daily newspaper to be produced using Desktop Publishing and the first newspaper in Europe to use infographics. In 1988, the printing process was switched to Offset printing and in 1992, Computer to Plate technology was implemented, making it the first newspaper printer worldwide to do so.

=== 1990s ===
In 1990, a third brand was added with the Neue Vorarlberger Tageszeitung. From 1993, the newspapers were produced on the new Geoman No. 1 printing press. With this machine, VN became the first four-color printed daily newspaper in the world. From 1995, the company became an internet provider and portal operator, and in the same year, the first regionally oriented news portal VOL.AT went online. Two years later, broadband internet and cable TV were added, which the company offers to Vorarlberg customers. In 1998, Russmedia launched Antenne Vorarlberg as the first state-wide private radio station in Vorarlberg. Outside Austria, the company operates in Hungary and Romania with a sister company (Inform Media), of which 100 percent of shares were acquired from 1998. Inform Media's portfolio initially included print media and later also online portals.

=== 2000s ===
In Hungary and Romania, numerous online portals were added. In 2003, Inform Media founded a new newspaper in Romania, bought two more, and established an offset printing facility. In 2005, the first step into Germany was taken with the purchase of the South German Quoka publishing house based in Lampertheim. In 2006, Vorarlberger Nachrichten was awarded "Newspaper of the Year 2006" at the 59th World Newspaper Congress in Moscow. In Vorarlberg, several online portals were added, covering topics such as jobs, real estate, and automobiles.

=== From 2010 ===
With VOLmobil, the company succeeded in becoming the first regional provider to enter the mobile communications business. In the same year, the VOL.AT News Portal app was launched as the first German-language news app. A year later, Vorarlberger Nachrichten was offered as an E-paper for iPad. Another step toward internationalization was the 2011 acquisition of the world's largest online marketplace for rental items – erento.com. In the same year, the first issue of the regional society magazine Die Vorarlbergerin was published. In 2012, Russmedia Digital became the first sales partner of Google AdWords in Austria.

== Print and online media ==
Russmedia operates numerous online and print products across Europe. In 2013, these totaled 8 daily newspapers, 80 weekly newspapers, and over 100 online portals.

=== Austria ===
Russmedia's core product is the daily newspaper Vorarlberger Nachrichten. After acquiring the competing print media Wann&Wo and Neue Vorarlberger Tageszeitung in the 1980s, several print media belong to Russmedia.

Additionally, the online sector is continuously being expanded and enhanced. Portals in Austria include the leading regional news portal in Vorarlberg, Vorarlberg Online (VOL.at), and other news portals such as Vienna Online (vienna.at). Furthermore, topic-specific portals belong to Russmedia, such as laendleimmo.at, laendlejob.at, and laendleauto.at in Vorarlberg. The marketer austria.com/plus is also part of Russmedia's portfolio. This team markets, alongside its own portals, other federal state media such as the Tiroler Tageszeitung, Salzburger Nachrichten, Oberösterreichische Nachrichten, and others.

In 2016, as part of the Digital News Initiative (DNI) a promising publishing project by Russmedia was funded by Google, based on the behavioral economic findings of Zurich economics professor Ernst Fehr and the consulting insights of the economic and business consultancy FehrAdvice & Partners.

In the private radio sector, the station Antenne Vorarlberg was established.

=== Germany ===
In Germany, Russmedia operates exclusively in the online sector and runs numerous online marketplaces. The largest are Quoka and erento, others include mascus, pferde.de, and traumhochzeiten.com.

=== Hungary/Romania ===
In Hungary and Romania, several online marketplaces are operated. Generally, business models that work in Austria are also used in Hungary and Romania. In 2017, the Hungarian newspapers were sold.

=== Great Britain ===
In 2012, Russmedia's first office (Portal erento) was opened in Great Britain.

== Telecommunications Provider ==
With the private telephone provider VOLmobil and 1036hallo!, Russmedia also offers telecommunications services. As an Internet provider, the brand highspeed Internet belongs to it. It also offers call center services. In the Dornbirn Messepark, the company operates the bookstore "Das Buch."

== Business environment/scandals ==
The media house's strong market power is unmistakable: all Vorarlberg daily newspapers, various Vorarlberg-centered online offerings, as well as radio (Antenne Vorarlberg) give Russmedia the reputation of being a Vorarlberg-wide monopolist.

The personnel entanglement between the ÖVP faction in the Vorarlberg State Parliament and Russmedia through the person of Jürgen Kessler was criticized regarding concealed party donations.

=== Competitors ===
The largest competitor in Europe is Adevinta AG with numerous classified ad portals in Europe and worldwide. Ringier-Axel-Springer is particularly strong in German-speaking countries and Central Europe. Besides these, there are only smaller competitors, such as Scout24.

=== Cover ups ===
Russmedia has also become known for banning accounts online for speaking out on false reporting or deliberately not including some factual written opinions in their print media. One such example includes the false reporting on articles covering the genocide in Palestine. Many users online stated that their account was later banned for opposing their narrative after informing the redactorial team of the mistakes.
