= List of newspapers in Austria =

The first newspaper was published in Austria in 1605. Until 1940 there were 16 newspapers in Vienna, Austria, but six of them were shut down, leaving ten. The number of national daily newspapers in Austria was 35 in 1950. It decreased to 17 in 1965.

The number of daily newspapers in Austria was 17 in 1995 and remained the same between 1996 and 2000. Eight of them were nationwide newspapers and the remaining nine regional dailies.

In the mid-2000s, daily newspapers were very popular in the country with a cumulative readership of 72.7%. In 2009 the number of newspapers was 19 in Austria.

Below is a list of newspapers published in Austria.

== In German ==
- Heute
- Kärntner Tageszeitung
- Kleine Zeitung
- Kronen Zeitung
- Kurier
- Neue Vorarlberger Tageszeitung
- Niederösterreichische Nachrichten
- Oberösterreichische Nachrichten
- Österreich
- Die Presse
- Salzburger Nachrichten
- Salzburger Volkszeitung
- Der Standard
- Täglich Alles
- Tiroler Tageszeitung
- U-Express
- Das Vaterland
- Volksstimme
- Vorarlberger Nachrichten
- Wiener Zeitung
- WirtschaftsBlatt

== In English ==
- The Local (web only)
- Voice of Vienna (web only)
- Vienna Würstelstand

== See also ==
- Media of Austria
- List of magazines in Austria
