= Menorah =

Menorah may refer to:

- Jewish candelabra:
  - Temple menorah, a seven-branched candelabrum used in the Tabernacle, the Temple in Jerusalem, and synagogues
  - Hanukkah menorah, or hanukkiah, a nine-branched candelabrum used during the Jewish holiday of Hanukkah
- Menorah (magazine), an Austrian Jewish magazine
- Menorah: Worship, History, Legend, a 2017 Italian Jewish art exhibition
- Menorah Center, Dnipro, a Ukrainian Jewish community center
- The Menorah Journal, an American Jewish magazine
- Menorah Medical Center, an American Jewish hospital
- Menorah memorial (Mariupol), a Ukrainian Jewish memorial
- Menorah Primary School, an English Jewish school
- Menorah Synagogue, an English synagogue
- Menorah, a Swiss Christian denomination founded by Bruno Meyer
- Kfar HaOranim, an Israeli settlement in the West Bank also known as Menorah

== See also ==
- Menora (disambiguation)
- Menoreh, an Indonesian passenger train
