= Manora =

Manora may refer to:

- Manora, Karachi, in Karachi, Sindh, Pakistan
- Manora, Washim, a taluka in Washim district of Maharashtra, India
- Manora Cantonment, in Karachi, Sindh, Pakistan
- Manora Fort, Karachi, Karachi, Sindh, Pakistan
- Manora Fort, Thanjavur, Thanjavur, India
- Manora Island, an island in Karachi, Sindh, Pakistan
- Manora, the Thai pronunciation of Manohara, a character in Southeast Asian mythology
- Manora, the Thai pronunciation of Menora, a traditional dance of south Thailand and northern Malaysia states

== See also ==
- Manorah (disambiguation)
- Menora (disambiguation)
