= Addendum (research platform) =

- das, was fehlt (German) that, what is missing
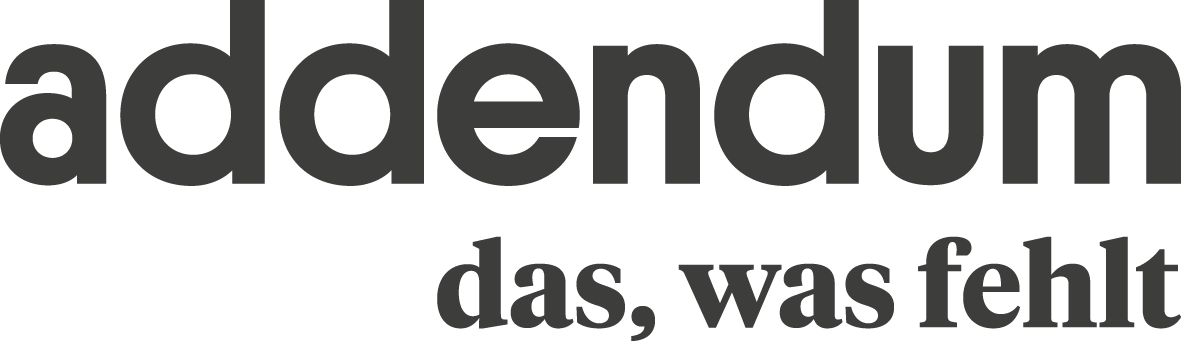
- Type: Investigative journalism
- Format: Website
- Owner(s): Quo Vadis Veritas (funded by Dietrich Mateschitz)
- Publisher: Michael Fleischhacker
- Editor: Stefan Kaltenbrunner; Stephan Frank; Lucia Marjanović
- General manager: Niko Alm; Michael Fleischhacker
- Founded: September 25, 2017; 8 years ago
- Headquarters: Halleiner Landesstraße 24; 5061 Elsbethen-Glasenbach; Salzburg
- Country: Austria
- Website: www.addendum.org

Addendum (from Latin addendum, meaning (that which) must be added) is an Austrian journalistic research platform, funded by billionaire Dietrich Mateschitz through the non-profit organisation Quo Vadis Veritas. The release of its first research findings occurred on 25 September 2017. Its managing directors are Michael Fleischhacker (who also serves as the publisher) and Niko Alm.

== See also ==
- Media in Austria
- Red Bull GmbH
- List of newspapers in Austria
- Investigative journalism
