= Emil Löbl =

Austrian journalist (1863–1942)

Emil Löbl (February 5, 1863, in Vienna – August 26, 1942, in Vienna) was an Austrian writer and journalist.

== Life ==
Born into a Jewish family, Löbl was the son of Isak Löbl (Herzl) and Rosalie Löbl (Neumann).

Like his older brother Leopold (1844–1907), he studied law at the University of Vienna and received his Dr. jur. degree in 1891. During his studies he was active as a journalist in the Reichsrätlichen Stenografenbüro from 1882. From 1893 to 1898 he served in the k.k. Council of Ministers, and from 1895 as Ministerial Vice-Secretary.

He was deputy editor-in-chief at the Wiener Zeitung and from 1909 editor-in-chief. In 1917 Löbl became editor-in-chief of the Neues Wiener Tagblatt (NWT), whose circulation he was able to increase substantially. In March 1938, as Austria prepared to merge with Nazi Germany in the Anschluss, he was fired.

Löbl was married to Gisela Gisa Basseches (June 10, 1870-1942). She was deported to the Treblinka concentration camp and murdered by the Nazis in the Holocaust.

Löbl died on August 26, 1942, at the Rothschild Hospital in Vienna, which, under the Nazis, was the only hospital for Jews in Vienna.

== Publications ==
- Kultur und Presse. Duncker & Humblot, Leipzig 1903; Neuauflage 2013, ISBN 978-3-428-16030-3
  - herausgegeben, eingeleitet und kommentiert von Wolfgang Duchkowitsch, Nomos-Verlag, Edition Reinhard Fischer, Baden-Baden 2017, ISBN 978-3-8487-3961-5
- Verlorenes Paradies. Erinnerungen eines alten Wieners. Rikola, Wien 1924.

== See also ==
- The Holocaust in Austria
- Anschluss
- Austrian newspapers
- Unser Wien
