= Be aware and share =

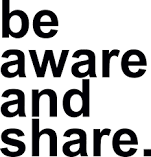
- Founded: 2015
- Founder: Bastian Seelhofer
- Type: relief
- Purpose: Well being of refugees, especially children.
- Location: Frenkendorf (Switzerland), Eggstrasse 19
- Region served: 2 countries (Greece and Switzerland)
- Method: Emergency relief, community development and schools for refugee camps.
- Key people: Mara Massari (Administration); Cécile Speitel (Communication)
- Employees: around 20 (2017)
- Website: www.baas-schweiz.ch

Be aware and share is a Swiss relief organization founded in 2015 in the context of the European migrant crisis, and a documentary film released in 2016.

== The relief organization ==
The charity work Be aware and share is a relief agency currently operating in Switzerland and Greece. It was founded in Basel in 2015 by social worker Bastian Seelhofer and colleagues.

When the refugee crisis intensified in the summer of 2015, Seelhofer's team decided to transport relief supplies to the Hungarian-Croatian border. In addition, there were deployments for stranded refugees on the Greek island of Chios, a few kilometers from the Turkish Aegean coast. There Seelhofer resigned his position as a youth worker in Switzerland and Be Aware and Share devoted themselves to the project.

In May 2016, Be aware and share founded a school in Chios. The NGO called for the UNESCO initiative Education Cannot Wait. Through donations collected in Switzerland and through voluntary work, the organization offers several dozen refugee children and other young people a structured school day with at least two lessons per day. The teachers, mainly refugees themselves, teach languages (mainly English and native languages of the refugees, for example Arabic) and mathematics, among other things. The charity works with other organizations and is financially supported by major relief organizations such as the Norwegian Refugee Council.

== The film ==
The Swiss-Iranian filmmaker Omid Taslimi, together with Lasse Linder, shot a documentary film about when Be aware and share went to the Croatian-Hungarian border at Botovo (Drnje) in October 2015. The film shows the project’s origin came about: the collection of clothes at the beginning, the great interest from the Swiss population, the founding of the association, and a charity concert with Collie Herb, La Nefera and other regional musicians. There are logistical problems and the team travels by vans to Croatia. The Swiss helpers find Croatian allies, and with them, at the border station of Botovo, they give food and clothes to refugees who get off the train and cross the border to Hungary.

Apart from situation recordings, the film includes several short interviews with team members, other participants (for example, members of the Bernese aid organization Cibera) and ORF correspondent Christian Wehrschütz. In general, Taslimi focused the film strongly on the motivation of the activists. The film was shown in various Swiss movie theaters.
