= Neues Wiener Journal =

Austrian newspaper

The Neues Wiener Journal was one of the leading liberal newspapers in Austria during the late 19th and early 20th centuries., it was compulsorily disestablished by Nazi Germany in 1939 when both it and the Neue Freie Presse were forcibly merged with the Neues Wiener Tagblatt.
