= Eduard Bacher =

Austrian jurisconsult and journalist

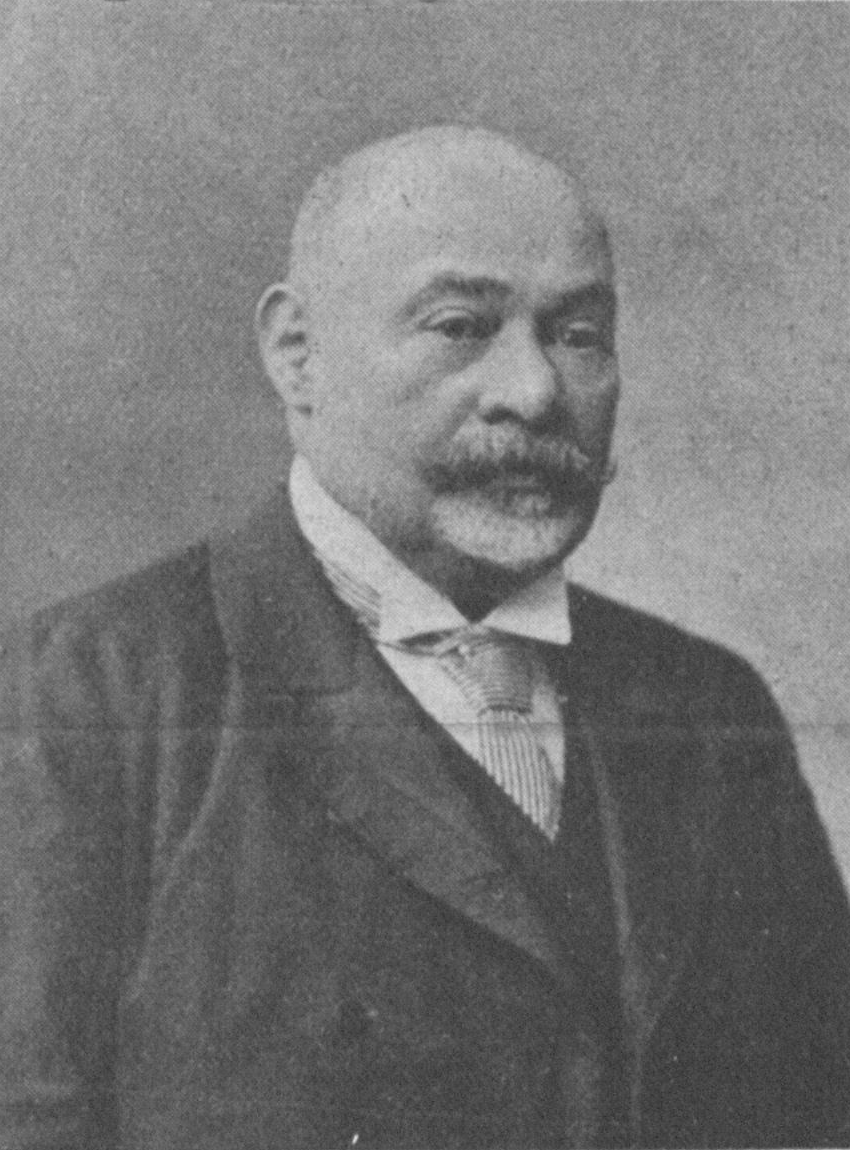
Eduard Bacher (1904)

Edouard Bacher (7 March 1846 in Postelberg – 16 January 1908 in Vienna) was an Austrian jurisconsult and journalist.

Graduating from the University of Vienna, he engaged in practise as an advocate; in this career, he displayed such marked ability that some years later the Reichsrat appointed him its chief stenographer. In 1872, Bacher began to work for the Neue Freie Presse, the paper which later became Die Presse, as a parliamentary reporter, and on 1 May 1879, he became the chief editor of the paper.

A feature of his time with the Neue Freie Presse was the running battle with the Paris correspondent, the Zionist Theodor Herzl. After his death, Bacher was succeeded by Moriz Benedikt.

== Sources ==
- Eisenberg, Das Geistige Wien, p. 15;
- Adolph Kohut, Berühmte Israelitische Männer und Frauen, p. 133
- New York Times book review touching on his relationship with Theodor Herzl
