= Werthner =

Werther is a German surname. Notable people with the surname include:

- Adolf Werthner (1828–1906), German publisher
- Georg Werthner (born 1956), Austrian decathlete
- Penny Werthner (born 1951), Canadian track and field athlete
