= Erlo =

Erlo may refer to:

- Erlo (mountain), a mountain in Azpeitia, Gipuzkoa, Basque County, Spain
- Erlo Stegen (1935–2023), South African missionary
- Louis Erlo (1929–2026), French theatre director
