= Addendum (disambiguation) =

An addendum is an addition required to be made to a document by its author subsequent to its printing or publication.

Addendum may also refer to:

- Addendum (research platform), an Austrian journalistic research platform
- Addendum (John Maus album), 2018
- Addendum (EP), by Health, 2026
- Addendum, 2001 album by Assemblage 23
