= Eva Deissen =

Austrian woman journalist

Eva Deissen (29 November 1947 – 28 December 2010) was an Austrian journalist and columnist.

== Life ==
Deissen worked as a reporter from 1968, then as a columnist. She was particularly committed to women's political issues. She published her articles in the Kronen Zeitung and then in the täglich Alles. In 2001, she worked at the publishing house "echomedia" for the Viennese magazine "Wien live where she wrote portraits and social reports. In the Austrian daily newspaper Heute Deissen wrote the column Wiener Spaziergänge since 2004. Deissen died aged 63 and was buried at the Vienna Central Cemetery on 18 January 2011.

== Work ==
- Eva Deissen: Neue Kronen Zeitung Kochbuch. Ueberreuter (1991), ISBN 3-800-03417-4.
- Hans Weiss und Eva Deissen: Hermann Leopoldi. Schön is so a Ringelspiel. Orac Verlag (1996), ISBN 3-701-51001-6.
- Eva Deissen: 50 Jahre Ringturm. echomedia (2005), ISBN 3-901-76150-0.
- Dietmar Posteiner und Eva Deissen: Mörbisch: Ein Festival schreibt Operettengeschichte. echomedia (2007), ISBN 3-901-76162-4.

== Awards ==
- 1980: Dr.-Karl-Renner-Publizistikpreis
