= Neues Wiener Tagblatt =

Former Austrian daily newspaper

The Neues Wiener Tagblatt was a daily newspaper published in Vienna from 1867 to 1945. It was one of the highest-circulation newspapers in Austria before 1938.

== History ==
The newspaper was founded by Eduard Mayer as a successor to the Wiener Journal. The first issue appeared on 10 March 1867, the year of the Compromise with Hungary and the enactment of the so-called December Constitution, valid until 1918. As early as 13 July 1867 the publisher Moritz Szeps, who had left the Morgen-Post newspaper in a dispute, took over. From 1870 he supported Josef Schöffel with a campaign in his successful fight for the Vienna Woods. Szeps' connection to Crown Prince Rudolf meant that anonymous political texts by the crown prince could repeatedly appear in the paper, in which he advocated the liberal, progressive development of Austria.

Szeps remained the sole owner and publisher of the paper until 15 May 1872, then contributed the paper to the Steyrermühl-Verlag publishing house, which he had co-founded in 1872, and remained the paper's publisher as a shareholder until 15 October 1886.

From 1874 onward, the newspaper was Vienna's highest-circulation paper. It was German liberal and anti-Marxist, but did not develop a clear stance on the emerging mass parties of the Christian Socialists and the Social Democrats in the monarchy.

In the First Republic, the paper published by the Steyrermühl Group became the political mouthpiece of Rudolf Sieghart, the autocratic head of the Bodencreditanstalt, which Steyrermühl financed. The paper's line supported the Heimwehren and the policies of the Christian Social Party. This did not change even after the collapse of the Bodencreditanstalt in October 1929 and Sieghart's withdrawal.

The newspaper welcomed the shutdown of parliament in March 1933, although it expressed concerns about the preservation of freedom of expression.

== Expropriation and restructuring 1938 ==
After Austria's annexation by Nazi Germany in March 1938, the newspaper was immediately put at the service of the Nazi propaganda apparatus. Editor-in-chief Emil Löbl was replaced by a Nazi party member on the evening of 11 March 1938, before the Wehrmacht marched in. On 27 July 1938 the owners of the newspaper were forced to sell the paper to a Berlin trust company, which on 15 September 1938 incorporated it into the new Ostmärkische Zeitungsverlagsgesellschaft, behind whose straw man was the Nazi publishing house, Franz-Eher-Verlag.

On 31 January 1939 the Neues Wiener Journal was discontinued and, together with the traditional paper Neue Freie Presse, was incorporated into the Neues Wiener Tagblatt. The last issue of the newspaper appeared on 7 April 1945, when the Battle of Vienna began.

== Tagblatt-Archives ==
The extensive Tagblatt archive was the only Viennese newspaper archive to survive the war. It was first taken over in 1945 by the communist Globus publishing house, which was designated by the Soviet occupying power as the user of Steyrermühl structures, and then by the Vienna Chamber of Labor. Since 2002, the Tagblatt archive has been part of the holdings of the Vienna Library in City Hall.

== Notable employees ==
Notable employees include Hermann Bahr, Werner Bergengruen, Franz Karl Ginzkey, Ludwig Karpath, Ernst Mach, Eduard Pötzl, Heinrich Pollak, Karl Tschuppik, Moriz Scheyer and Fritz Sänger.

Editors-in-chief:

- Eduard Mayer (10 March 1867 to 13 July 1867)
- Moritz Szeps (until 15 October 1886)
- Moriz Wengraf (until October 1891)
- Wilhelm Singer (until 10 October 1917)
- Emil Löbl (until 11 March 1938)
- Heinrich Eichinger (until 19 March 1938)
- Erwin H. Rainalter (until 4 July 1939)
- Walter Petwaidic (until 30 November 1940)
- Otto Häcker (1 April 1941 to 5 April 1945)

== Literature ==
- Das Feuilleton des Neues Wiener Tagblattes zwischen den beiden Weltkriegen. Universität Wien. 1951.
- Helmut W. Lang (Hrsg.): Österreichische Retrospektive Bibliographie (ORBI). Reihe 2: Österreichische Zeitungen 1492–1945. Band 3: Helmut W. Lang, Ladislaus Lang, Wilma Buchinger: Bibliographie der österreichischen Zeitungen 1621–1945. N–Z. Bearbeitet an der Österreichischen Nationalbibliothek. K. G. Saur, München 2003, ISBN 3-598-23385-X, S. 63–64.
- Neues Wiener Tagblatt, Sonderbeilage zum 31. Mai 1931, S. 75 ANNO
