= Adolf Werthner =

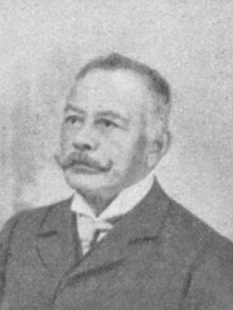
Image of Adolf Werthner

Adolf Werthner (18 July 1828 – 26 January 1906) was the founder of the Neue Freie Presse newspaper and president of the Österreichische Journal-Aktiengesellschaft. He was born in Breslau, Prussian Silesia, and died in Vienna, Austria-Hungary.

Werthner entered the administration of Die Presse, which was founded by August Zang during the revolutionary year of 1848. After a dispute with Zang, Werthner left the newspaper's editorial board in 1864. Shortly afterward, Werthner, Max Friedländer, and Michael Etienne founded the Neue Freie Presse on 1 September 1864.
