= CD Austria =

Austrian computer magazine

CD Austria was an Austrian computer magazine published monthly by CDA Verlag, Perg that was owned by Harald Gutzelnig from 1995 until July 2014. It was part of the Österreichische Auflagenkontrolle. The edition of CD Austria was 16.485 copies during the first half of 2010.

== Content ==
There were two different types of magazines which alternated every two months. CD Austria Praxis discussed themes like hints for office suites and computer hobbyists. It also included a double-sided DVD which contains software on one side and video tutorials on the other. CD Austria also tests new hardware and software as well as websites.

In Germany, it was issued under the alternating titles of PC News (corresponding to CD Austria) and PC User (corresponding to CD Austria Praxis) every two months.

== See also ==
- List of magazines in Austria
