= Allgemeine Bauzeitung =

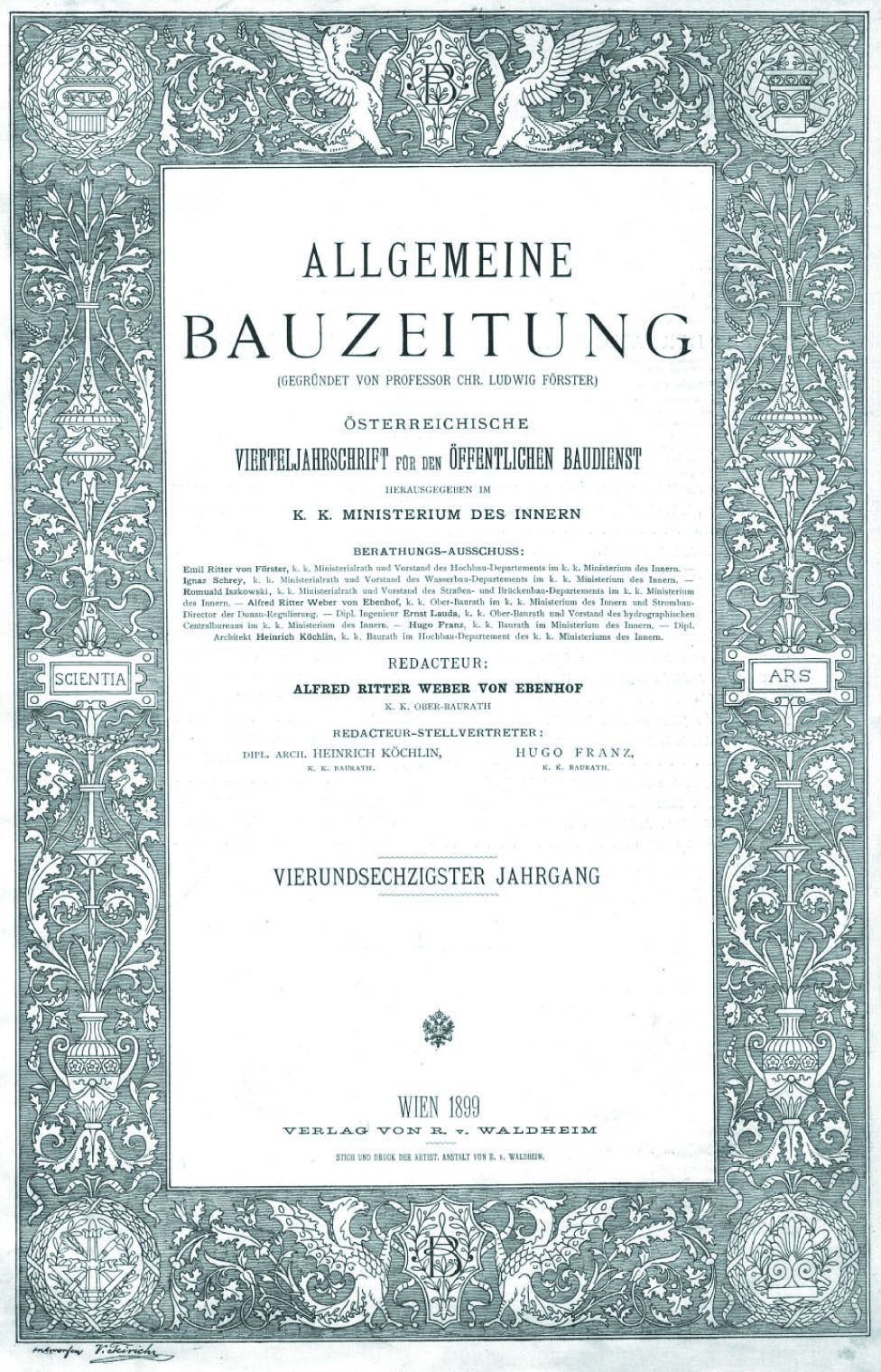
- Publisher: Architecture
- Founded: 1836
- Final issue: 1918
- Country: Austria
- Based in: Vienna
- Language: German
- ISSN: 0002-5801
- OCLC: 145083271

The Allgemeine Bauzeitung was founded in 1836 by the architect Ludwig Förster and was the most important architectural publication of the Austrian monarchy. The magazine was based in Vienna. It was shut down in 1918.

== See also ==
List of magazines in Austria
