= Biber (magazine) =

Biber is an Austrian news magazine published in Vienna, Austria. The name "Biber" is German for beaver and Turkish and Serbo-Croatian for pepper.

== History and profile ==
Biber was founded in 2006 by Simon Kravagna, and is published ten times a year. The thematic context refers to readers with an immigrant background. Most articles concern themselves with culture, politics, economics, lifestyle and society. Many of the reporters have roots in other countries- particularly Turkey and the former Yugoslavia. The magazine is close to Muslim community in Austria. Circulation is currently about 65,000.

The publication is available free at schools, subway stations and various markets and news outlets.

== See also ==
List of magazines in Austria
