= Dérive (magazine) =

dérive – Zeitschrift für Stadtforschung
- Editor-in-chief: Christoph Laimer
- Categories: Urbanism
- Frequency: Quarterly
- Publisher: dérive – Verein für Stadtforschung
- Founded: 2000; 26 years ago
- Country: Austria
- Based in: Vienna
- Language: German, English
- Website: www.derive.at
- ISSN: 1608-8131

dérive – Zeitschrift für Stadtforschung is an Austrian science magazine on urbanism.

== History and profile ==
dérive is published quarterly since 2000 by the Vienna based Verein für Stadtforschung.

The journal publishes articles from a broad range of urbanism disciplines such as architecture, urban and land-use planning, art, geography, sociology, or philosophy. Articles from urban sociology include contributions from Loïc Wacquant and Saskia Sassen.

== Name ==
Dérive is a concept of psychogeography that includes unplanned journeys through urban space. The individual travels where the subtle aesthetic contours of the surrounding architecture and geography subconsciously direct them, with the ultimate goal of encountering an entirely new and authentic experience.

== Networks ==
The magazine is part of the European network of cultural magazines Eurozine.

== Urbanize ==
The journal also hosts the annual festival urbanize on urban issues.

== See also ==
- List of magazines in Austria
