= Christian Wehrschütz =

Austrian journalist

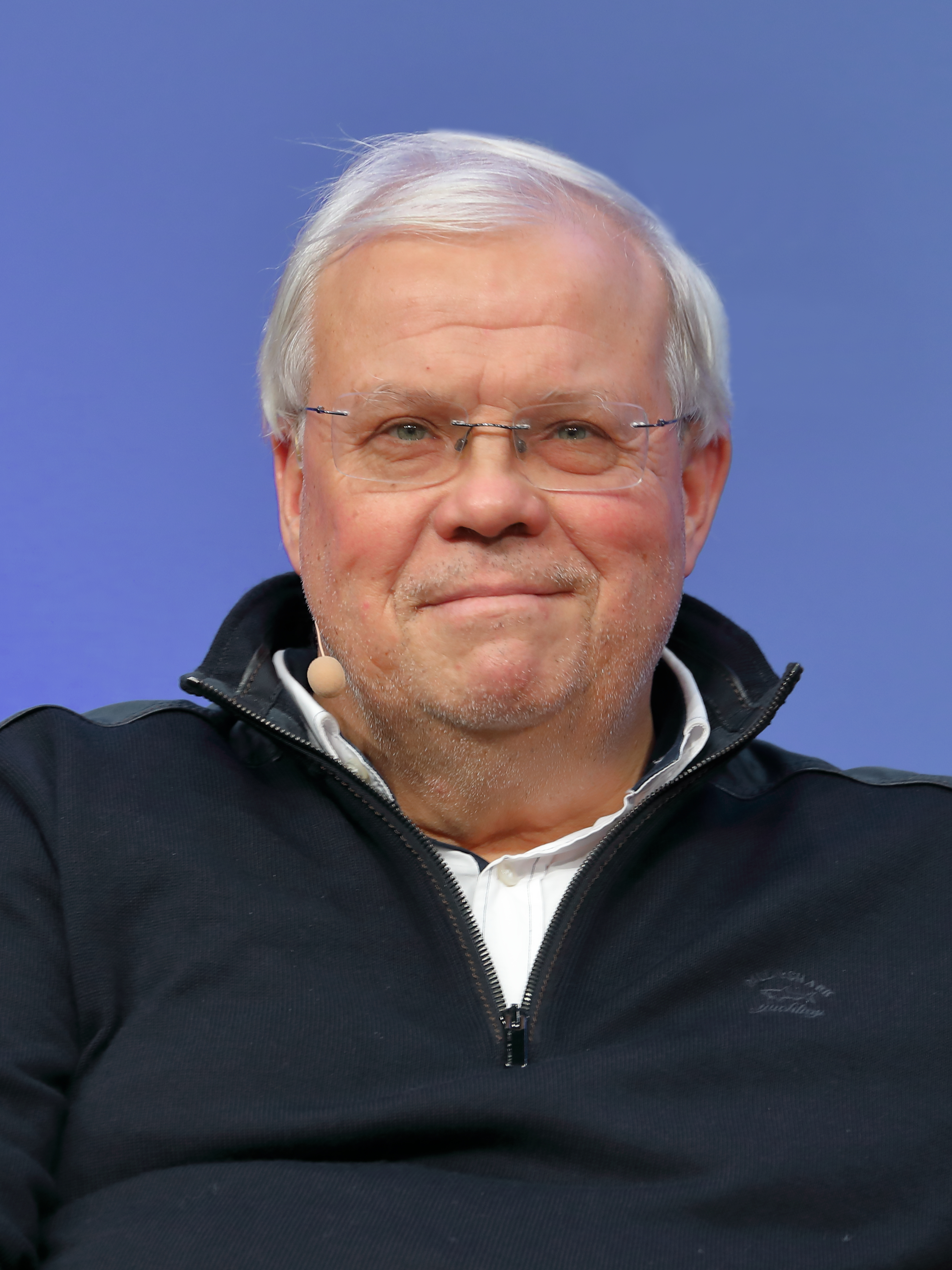
Christian Wehrschütz 2022

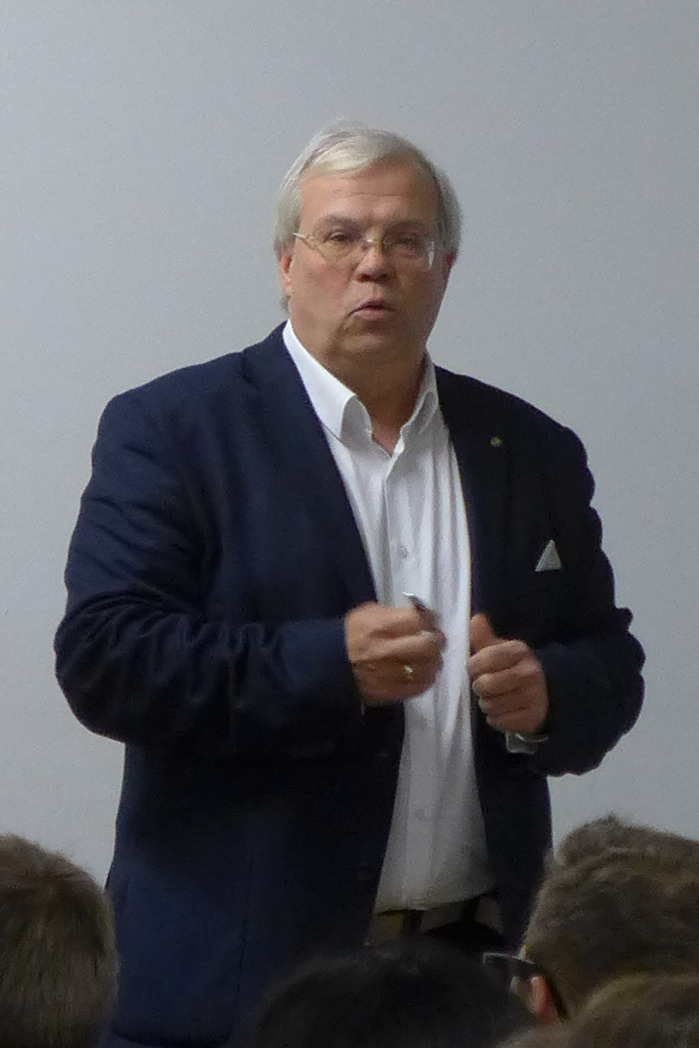
Christian Wehrschütz 2014

Christian Ferdinand Wehrschütz, born October 9, 1961, in Graz, is an Austrian journalist. He speaks German, English, Russian, Ukrainian, Serbian/Croatian, French, Slovenian, Macedonian and Albanian and is a military interpreter of Russian and Ukrainian. He is married and has two daughters.

== Life ==
After graduating in 1980 from secondary school (Bundesgymnasium und Bundesrealgymnasium Kirchengasse Graz) Wehrschütz studied law between 1981 and 1985 at the University of Graz, and furthermore also slavic studies, though he never got a degree in this field.

=== Professional background ===
Wehrschütz is reservist (major) in the Austrian army - Bundesheer (Major).

=== Journalistic career ===
Wehrschütz started his journalistic career working for the far-right monthly magazine Aula, for which he wrote articles until 1983. In the years 1987 - 1990 Wehrschütz was editor-in-chief of the weekly newspaper Neue Freie Zeitung, the party organ of the Austrian Freedom Party (FPÖ) and also wrote articles for other journals.

In 1988 he worked as a trainee at the Neue Zürcher Zeitung, where he wrote reviews under the section title "The Political Book" for several years. He writes regularly for Kleine Zeitung about the Balkans. He has also written many articles for various publications.

Since 1991 Wehrschütz works for Austrian national public service broadcaster ORF. First he worked for its teletext service, in 1992 he joined the ORF radio news service. In 1999, Wehrschütz was sent by ORF as a Balkans expert to Belgrade, from where he supervises the reporting on former Yugoslavia and Albania. For two years, he was also responsible for Bulgaria.

In June 2011 Wehrschütz was a candidate to become director of ORF, representing the Austrian Freedom Party (FPÖ). He did not, however, prevail over acting director Alexander Wrabetz, as he didn't have enough political support.

In September 2015 Wehrschütz was appointed head of the ORF office in Kyiv, Ukraine.

==== Awards ====
- In 1999 he was awarded the State Prize for journalistic achievements in the interest of spiritual national defense.
- In 2014 he was elected Journalist of the Year by the editors of the trade magazine The Austrian Journalist.
- in 2022 he received the Josef Krainer Award by State Government of Styria
- In 2024 he received the Golden Decoration of Honour for Services to the Republic of Austria
