= Open access in Austria =

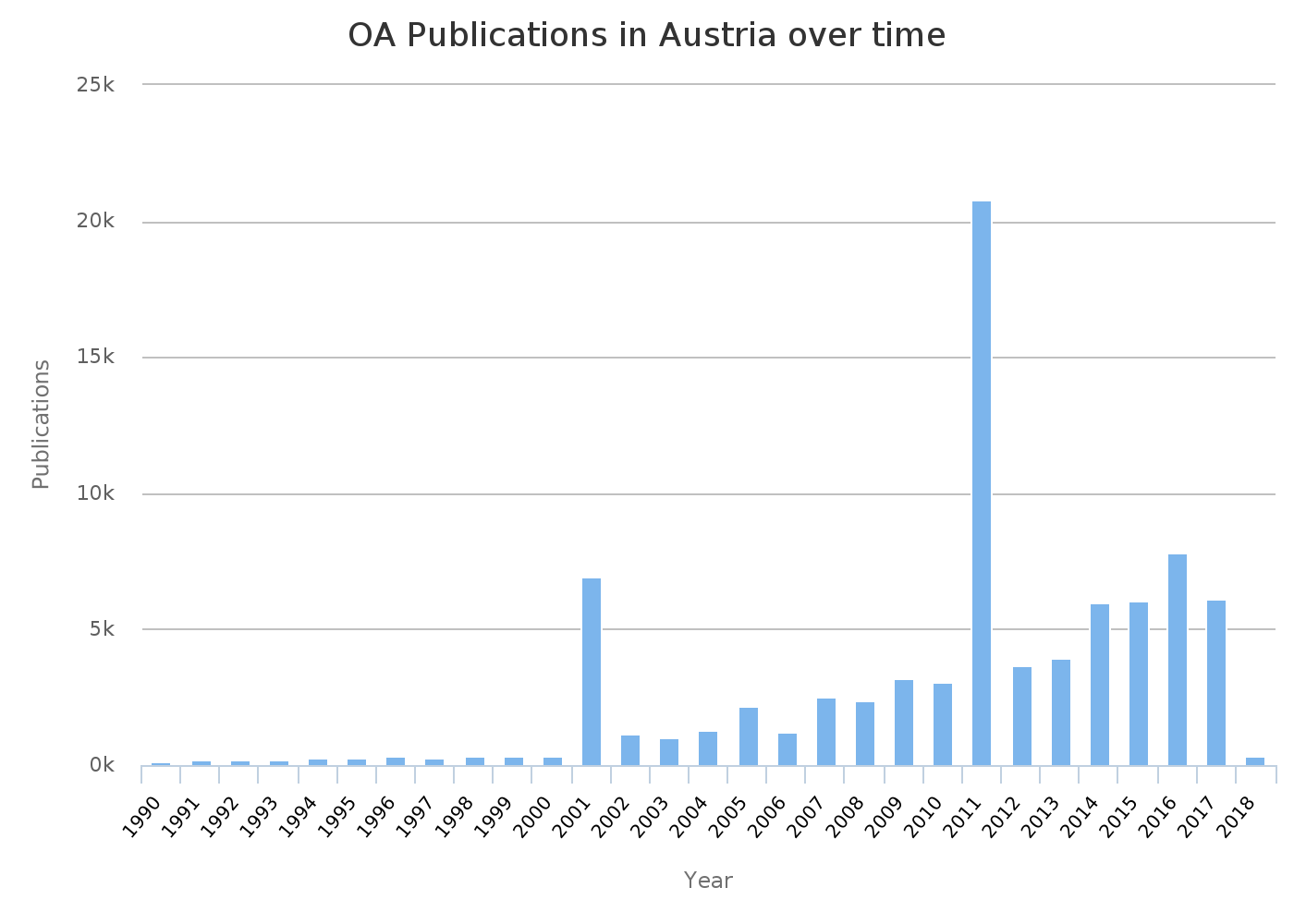
Growth of open access publications in Austria, 1990-2018

Open access to scholarly communication in Austria has developed in the 2010s largely through government initiatives. The Austrian Science Fund and Universities Austria launched the "Open Access Netzwerk Austria" in 2012 to coordinate country-wide efforts. The "E-Infrastructures Austria" project began in 2014 to develop repositories. The international advocacy effort "OpenscienceASAP – Open Science as a Practice" is based in Austria.

== Repositories ==
There are a number of collections of scholarship in Austria housed in digital open access repositories. They contain journal articles, book chapters, data, and other research outputs that are free to read.

== Timeline ==
Key events in the development of open access in Austria include the following:

- 2007
  - June: International Conference on Electronic Publishing held in Vienna.
- 2012
  - Open Access Netzwerk Austria established.
- 2014
  - E-Infrastructures Austria begins.
- 2022
  - Open Science Policy Austria improves open access for Austrian scientific research.

== See also ==
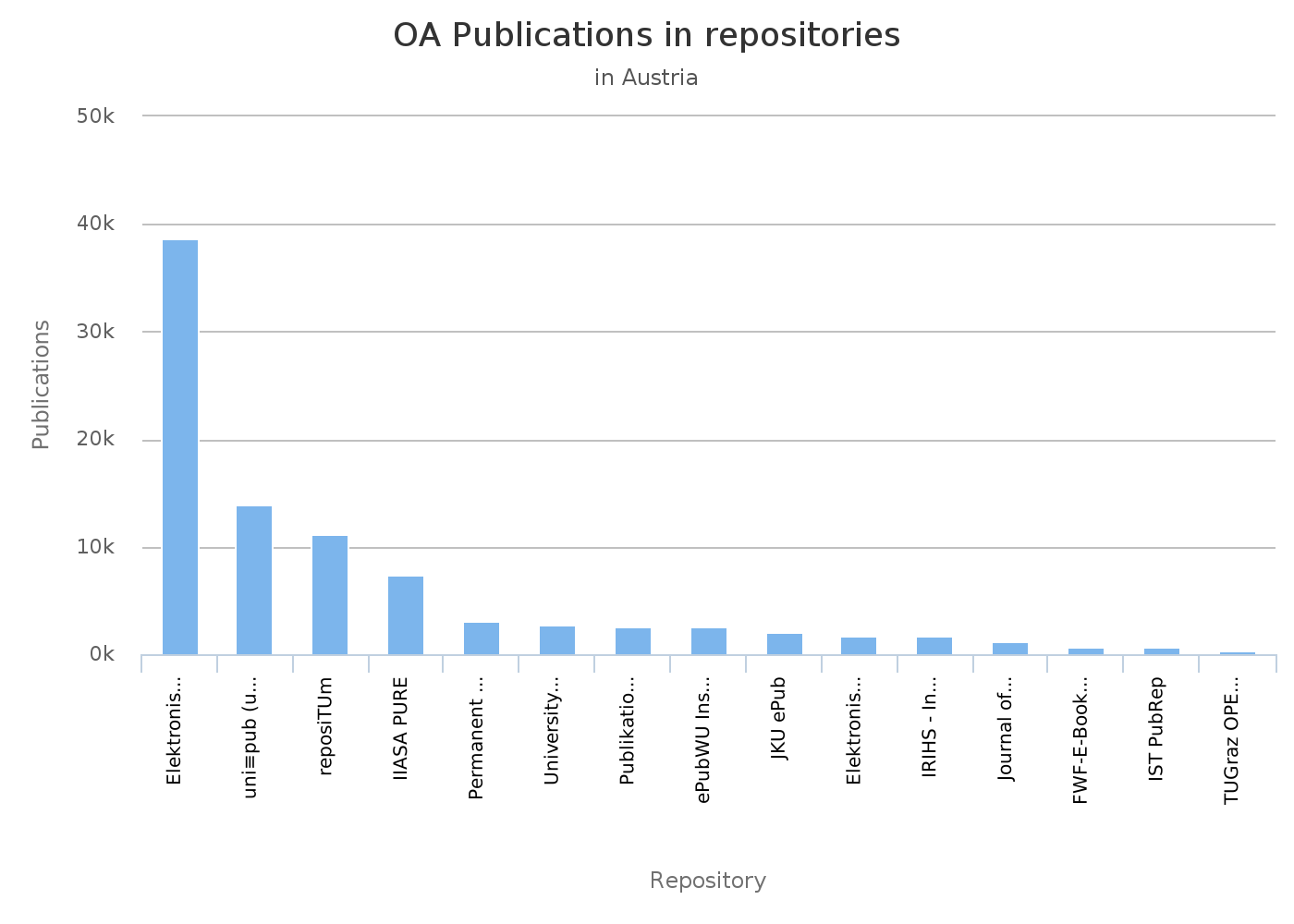
Number of open access publications in various Austrian repositories, 2018

- Internet in Austria
- Education in Austria
- Media of Austria
- List of libraries in Austria
- Open access in other countries
