= Moriz Scheyer =

Austrian author

Moriz Scheyer (27 December 1886 in Focșani, Romania – 29 March 1949 in Belvès, France) was an Austrian author. In his lifetime best known for his literary essays and reviews, he is the author of Asylum, a vivid account of his experiences as a Jewish refugee in France during the Second World War, first discovered and published more than sixty-five years after his death.

== Biography ==
Moriz Scheyer was born in Focșani in Romania on 27 December 1886, the son of Wilhelm Scheyer, a businessman, and Josefine (née Krasnopolsky). By the time of his secondary education the family had moved to Vienna, where they lived in the pleasant suburb of Hietzing. After high school (Gymnasium), where he excelled in humanities and languages, Scheyer studied at the University of Vienna, from which he graduated with a law degree in 1911. He began his career as a writer with short pieces for newspapers, joining the staff of the Neues Wiener Tagblatt (NWT; one of Vienna's two 'quality' dailies) in 1914.

A committed 'good European' and devotee of the internationalist and pacifist Romain Rolland, he expressed his horror at the atrocities of the First World War; a chronic health condition may in any case have exempted him from active service. He also wrote bitterly of the devastating aftermath of the conflict, the Great Depression, in Austria.

He travelled extensively – making a sea voyage via Egypt to South America before 1919 – and these travels inspired much of his early writing.

A lover of French culture and literature, Scheyer had lived in Paris in the period before 1924, as a cultural correspondent for the NWT, and continued to visit regularly after his return to Vienna. He also seems to have spent some time as a correspondent in Switzerland.

From 1924, in Vienna, until his dismissal at the Anschluss, Scheyer was arts editor of the Neues Wiener Tagblatt. He was in charge of the review section (‘Theater und Kunst’) and thus held a position of significant cultural influence. Acquainted with many of Vienna's prominent literary and musical figures, such as Arthur Schnitzler, Joseph Roth and Bruno Walter, he was a personal friend of Stefan Zweig, with whom his work has some strong affinities (see 2.4 below).

In October 1927 he married Margarethe Schwarzwald (née Singer), the daughter of a successful Czech-Jewish industrialist and widow of Dr Bernhard Schwarzwald, and through the marriage acquired two adoptive sons, Stefan and Konrad (after emigration to UK: Stephen Sherwood and Konrad Singer).

With the advent of the National Socialist regime in Austria in March 1938 (the Anschluss), Scheyer, at the height of his career, lost his position on the NWT, as well as any possibility of further employment in Austria. He escaped via Switzerland to Paris, accompanied by his wife and their long-term housekeeper and companion, Sláva Kolářová. This experience, as well as that of life in Paris both immediately before and after German occupation, the flight south in the 'Exodus', a period of incarceration in the French camp of Beaune-la-Rolande, life in the 'free zone', a series of extraordinarily narrow escapes from deportation to a death camp, and a final rescue by the Rispals, a family involved in the Resistance, followed by life in hiding in a Franciscan Convent in the Dordogne, are recounted in vivid detail in Asylum.

Scheyer remained in France (through the generosity of the Rispals) for the rest of his life, without returning to Austria. He had suffered from a chronic heart condition even before the traumatic experiences of 1938–44, and died in 1949. It seems that he made some effort to have his autobiographical work published, but ultimately despaired of finding anyone interested in what had happened 'only' to Jews.

== Work ==
Until the posthumous discovery and publication of the autobiographical work Asylum, Moriz Scheyer's main literary output consisted of travel writing, book and theatre reviews (in particular for the Josefstädter Theatre) and, especially, essays in the distinctively European genre of the feuilleton – pieces inspired by a particular event, e.g. a book publication or exhibition, but going beyond mere review in their personal reflection or historical analysis. His first three published books are travel writings; the remaining three published in his lifetime are collections of feuilletons, previously published in the NWT. His autobiographical 'survivor's account', Asylum, was discovered by his step grandson P. N. Singer many years after his death, and first published in English translation in 2016.

== Travel writing ==
Scheyer's early books Europeans and Exotics, Tralosmontes and Cry from the Tropical Night are inspired by his travels, especially in the near East and in South America. Largely factual (although Tralosmontes seems more in the style of a novella), they consist of vivid depictions or vignettes, and are preoccupied with the 'exotic', in terms of both place and character. Examples are Saadi ibn Tarbush, a young Egyptian boy who acts as Scheyer's guide in Cairo, but is seduced by the glamour of the European's life; Mr Dronnink, a Dutch musical genius ruined by a woman and by drink, ‘burnt out’ and reduced to playing the piano on cruise ships; and Gly Cangalho, a morphine-addicted ‘Creole’ character who spends her life travelling on cruises, known to all the captains. There are also parodic Englishmen – themselves exotic in their ability to be at home everywhere and lack any emotional response to the exotic around them. Vivid pictures are painted of the experience of a tropical night on the ship; of storms, of cockfights, of the ‘coffee coast’; Scheyer creates an eerie, exotic world, both through his character portraits and through his evocation of atmosphere and place.

== Literary and historical essays ==
Scheyer's remaining books of the 1920s and 1930s – Escape to Yesterday, Human Beings Fulfil Their Destiny and Genius and its Life on Earth – are essentially collections of feuilletons; they focus especially on the lives and works of great men or women, especially great artists, of the past, from Balzac to Verlaine, from Mata Hari to Wilde. Although mainly focussed on historical figures and their artistic work, these essays share with the previous writings the atmosphere of nostalgia and the concern with vivid evocation of personality and place.

== Asylum ==
Scheyer's account of persecution by and rescue from the Nazis, Asylum, is utterly different from his previous writing in genre and purpose. As he claims at the outset, 'it has nothing to do with literature'; a work raw with emotion, it is concerned to recount the lived experience of the persecution, the 'mental misery' and 'broken souls' suffered by Jewish people under the Hitler regime. Nonetheless, it brings the same critical and evocative skills that Scheyer used in his professional life to bear upon these traumatic experiences. One may also – with terrible irony – draw a connection between Scheyer's earlier literary work and that lived reality. In the book published just before his exile, Genius and its Life on Earth, he suggests that men fulfil their destiny or achieve greatness through suffering (examples are Tolstoy, Verlaine, Wilde), while Scheyer's own later experience of persecution led to the writing of what is undoubtedly his most significant work. Moroeover, his interest in women in history who sacrifice themselves for the men in their lives (Lady Hamilton, Anna Grigoryevna Dostoyevskaya, Sofia Andreevna Tolstaya) finds a real-life echo in the immense debt that he owed to his wife Margarethe and companion Sláva, as well as to the self-sacrifice of the sisters of the Convent at Labarde – which he describes in moving detail.

== Style and literary milieu ==
Scheyer's reviews and essays show a strong engagement with contemporary Viennese writers, such as Hofmannsthal, Roth and Schnitzler. His own literary work, both in its emotive, evocative style and in its characteristic preoccupations, belongs distinctively within the Viennese literary milieu of the early twentieth century, and in particular shares much with his better-known friend and almost exact contemporary, Stefan Zweig (1881–1942). Three tendencies, especially, seem to link Scheyer's writing both with that milieu and with Zweig in particular: nostalgia, an obsession with 'great men', and a reverence for music.

A preoccupation with a vanishing, irrecoverable world runs through the work of many of the best-known writers of Vienna in the early twentieth century, e.g. Joseph Roth, Arthur Schnitzler, and especially Zweig. In the short story Buchmendel, Zweig laments the passing of the old-world literary café society of Vienna; in Chess, the result of the chess game is symbolic of the defeat of the old, gentlemanly order; and his last work, The World of Yesterday, nostalgically recalls the world of his parents' generation.

Scheyer, explicitly responding to Schnitzler, writes of Vienna as 'The reflection of a city that has since lost its own I'. Schnitzler's Vienna – that world of tradition and culture, of clear social orders and customs, of elegant love-affairs – is gone; it is a ‘disappearing dream, the resonance of a memory. Perhaps it will soon be no more than a barren word, an abstract concept without reference.’

Already in his first published book, Scheyer writes ‘... I have sought, again and again, to take refuge from the desolate reality of the last years in the only truth that still makes existence tolerable, opening wounds but at the same time healing them: memory.’ Nostalgia is the explicit theme of Scheyer's 1927 volume, Escape to Yesterday. Both quotations belong to specific historical contexts, the former looking back over the War years, the latter over those of the Depression. With still greater poignancy, Scheyer in Asylum talks of the lost innocence of the world of 1944, and of the past as seeming more real than the present.

The fascination with the 'great man' (and sometimes woman) of history is another preoccupation central to Scheyer's work, again one shared with Zweig. Zweig's most substantial published books are studies of historical figures: of Balzac, Dickens and Dostoevsky; of Casanova, Stendhal and Tolstoy; of Romain Rolland. Each of the above individuals was also the subject of a feuilleton by Scheyer – probably directly inspired by the previous Zweig publication. Scheyer's last two books consist largely of essays dramatizing the life-stories of such 'greats'; to the above names are added amongst others those of Baudelaire, Victor Hugo, Rembrandt, Verlaine and Wilde.

Music, particularly in the context of early-twentieth-century Vienna, played a pivotal role in forming Scheyer's world-view. Practitioners of classical music – especially opera – were popular and held in high intellectual esteem. Scheyer, though not himself a music critic, attended dress rehearsals at the Opera. In Asylum, he describes performers at the Vienna Opera in nostalgic and awed tones. His rediscovery of music while in hiding, via the radio, is depicted as a vivid, emotional experience in Asylum. He describes music as something that can return him to his past and take him outside his current reality.

Music also recurs (in a way which can again be paralleled in Zweig) as a metaphor in his writing: the sound of Nazi boots provides "the new theme tune of Parisian life." And, in the camp at Beaune, there is the "nightly symphony of misery and sorrow, with the rustling of straw running through it like a pedal note on the organ."

== Discovery and publication of posthumous work ==
The manuscript of Scheyer's dramatic survivor's account, Asylum (original German title 'Ein Überlebender'), thought to have been destroyed, was discovered fortuitously by the sons of Scheyer's stepson Konrad Singer in the process of the latter's house move in the 2000s. The text was translated, and published with notes and epilogue based on his further research, by P. N. Singer, Scheyer's step-grandson, in January 2016. It is published in the UK by Profile Books, with a US edition (Little, Brown), as well as German, French, Italian and Spanish editions.

P. N. Singer wrote an interesting account of the rediscovery of the manuscript and its peculiar time capsule quality in the online magazine Literary Hub

== Bibliography ==
Books

- Europeans and Exotics (Europäer und Exoten, Strache, Vienna 1919)
- Tralosmontes: von Fernen und Schicksalen, Amalthea, Zurich 1921
- Cry from the Tropical Night (Schrei aus der Tropennacht, Georg Müller, Munich 1926)
- Escape to Yesterday (Flucht ins Gestern, Georg Müller, Munich 1927)
- Human Beings Fulfil Their Destiny (Menschen erfüllen ihr Schicksal, Krystall, Vienna 1931)
- Genius and its Life on Earth (Erdentage des Genies. Ausgewählte Essais, Herbert Reichner, Vienna 1938)
- Asylum (Selbst das Heimweh war heimatlos: Bericht eines jüdischen Emigranten, 1938–1945 Rowohlt, Reinbek 2017), English transl. with epilogue by P. N. Singer, Profile Books, 2016

Journalism

- Reviews and feuilletons in "Neues Wiener Tagblatt", various dates 1919–1937; archive in Austrian State Library, cf. Anno (Austrian Newspapers Online)
