= Der Österreichische Volkswirt =

Business magazine in Austria (1908–1998)

- Categories: Business magazine; Political magazine
- Frequency: Biweekly
- Founder: Walther Federn
- Founded: September 1908
- Final issue Number: August 1998; 84
- Country: Austria
- Based in: Vienna
- Language: German
- ISSN: 0029-957X
- OCLC: 29802839

Der Österreichische Volkswirt (also known as ÖVW; German: The Austrian Economist) was an economics and political magazine published between 1908 and 1998 with an interruption from 1939 to 1945 in Vienna, Austria. It was the first business publication in the country. The subtitle of the magazine was Zeitschrift für Industrie und Finanzwesen (German: Industry and Finance Journal).

== History and profile ==
ÖVW was started in Vienna in September 1908. The founder of the magazine was Walther Federn. The magazine was published by Volkswirtschaftl. Verlag on a biweekly basis.

Karl Polanyi contributed to the magazine in the mid-1920s. He was also on the editorial team from 1924 to 1938. Polanyi was forced to leave the publication due to the start of Anschluss. Peter F. Drucker was another contributor of the magazine.

ÖVW ceased publication in 1938 after the publication of the issue 31. The magazine was restarted as a weekly magazine in December 1945. It was permanently closed in August 1998 following the publication of the issue 84.

== See also ==
- List of magazines in Austria
