= Neue Freie Presse =

Viennese newspaper (1864 - 1939)

Neue freie Presse
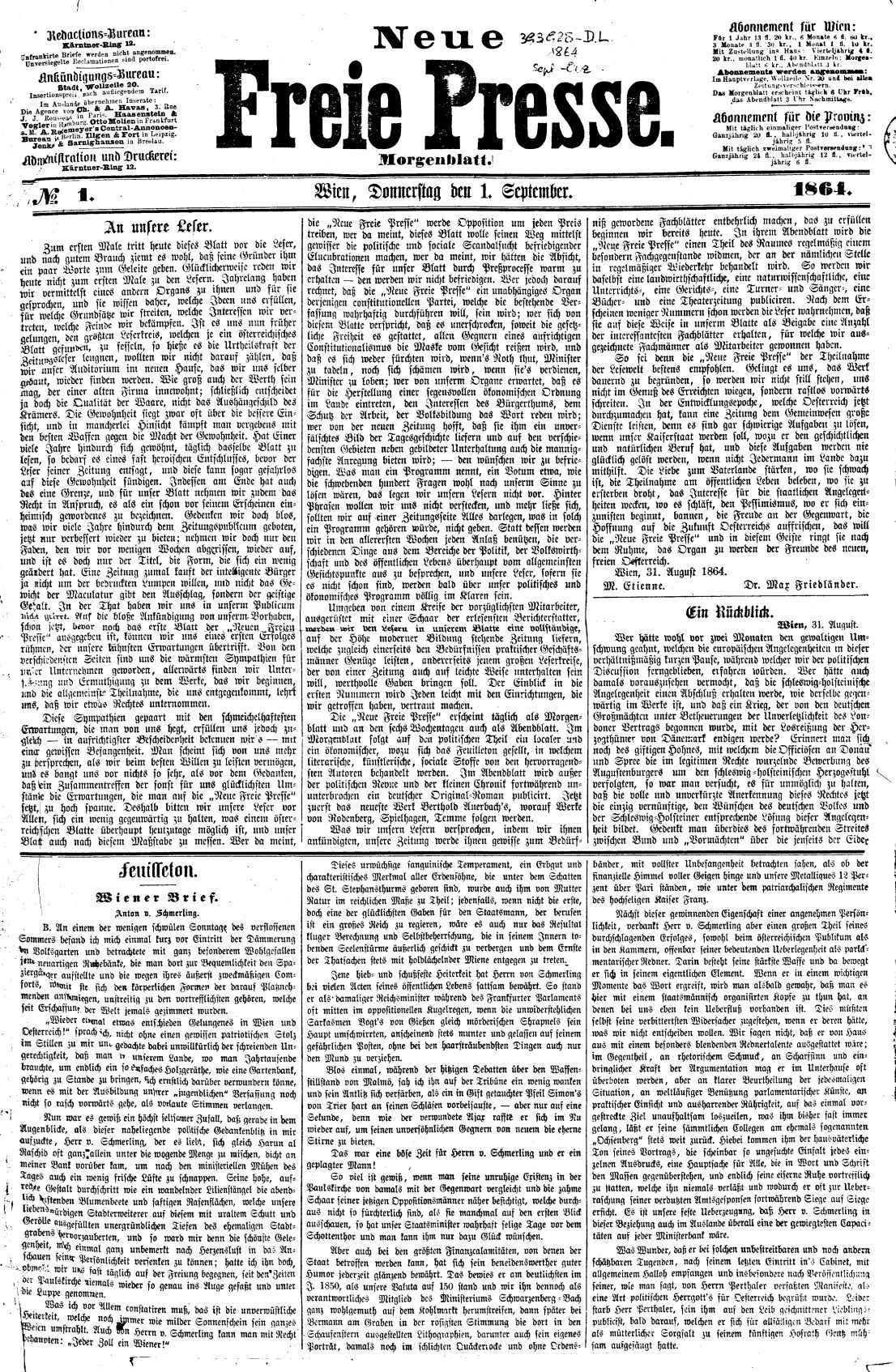
- Front page of the first issue of Neue Freie Presse
- Type: Daily
- Founder: Adolf Werthner
- Editor: Max Friedländer (1864–1872); Michael Etienne (1872–1879); Edward Baher (1879–1908); Moriz Benedikt (1908–1920); Julian Sternberg (1920–1938)
- Staff writers: 500
- Founded: September 1, 1864
- Ceased publication: January 31, 1939
- Political alignment: Liberal
- Language: German
- Headquarters: Vienna
- Circulation: 90,000 (1920)

Neue Freie Presse ("New Free Press") was a Viennese newspaper founded by Adolf Werthner together with the journalists Max Friedländer and Michael Etienne on 1 September 1864 after the staff had split from the newspaper Die Presse. It existed until January 31, 1939. Werthner was president of Oesterreichischen Journal-Aktien-Gesellschaft, the business entity behind the newspaper.

In 1879, Eduard Bacher became the editor-in-chief of the paper. The editor from 1908 to 1920, and eventual owner, was Moriz Benedikt.

Journalists employed by the paper included "Sil-Vara" (pseudonym of Geza Silberer) and Felix Salten.

In Paris, its correspondent was Raphael Basch, Max Nordau, and from 1891, Theodor Herzl, both founders of the Zionist movement. Its music critics included Eduard Hanslick (1864–1904) and Julius Korngold (1904–1934).

In his book The World of Yesterday, Stefan Zweig, a feuilletonist for the newspaper, called the Neue Freie Presse "the oracle of my fathers and the temple of the high priests" and described its role as arbiter of literary and artistic culture in fin de siècle Vienna, especially for those who "had little to do with literature, and did not presume to make literary judgments":

[T]o them, and to the entire Viennese bourgeoisie, important works were those that won praise in the Neue Freie Presse, and works ignored or condemned there didn't matter. They felt that anything published in the feuilleton was vouched for by the highest authority, and a writer who pronounced judgment there demanded respect merely by virtue of that fact.

The paper was the frequent target of satirist Karl Kraus.

== See also ==
- List of newspapers in Austria
