= Die Ganze Woche =

Austrian weekly boulevard magazine

- Categories: Boulevard magazine
- Frequency: Weekly
- Publisher: Die Ganze Woche GmbH
- Founder: Kurt Falk
- Founded: 1985; 41 years ago
- Company: Die Ganze Woche GmbH
- Country: Austria
- Based in: Vienna
- Language: German
- Website: Die Ganze Woche

Die Ganze Woche (German: The Whole Week) is an Austrian weekly boulevard magazine that is published in German.

== History and profile ==
Die Ganze Woche was launched by Kurt Falk in Vienna in 1985. He also founded the daily Täglich Alles. The magazine is published on a weekly basis. The publisher and owner of the magazine is Die Ganze Woche GmbH. Senta Ziegler was the editor-in-chief of the weekly until 1993.

Die Ganze Woche concentrates on entertainment news. On the other hand, the magazine also deals with significant political events. For instance, it opposed to the EU membership of Austria. Although it does not support the right-wing populist Freedom Party, the articles published in the magazine express similar views with the party in regard to corruption, immigration, crime rates, and cultural patriotism.

== Circulation and readership ==
Nine months after its establishment Die Ganze Woche reached 40% of the readers in the country. The magazine sold 342,000 copies in 2003 and 349,000 copies in the first quarter of 2004. In both periods it was the best-selling magazine in the country. The weekly's circulation for the first half of 2007 was 325,794 copies. The magazine sold 396,000 copies in 2007. Its circulation was 318,987 copies for the first half of 2008. In 2008 Die Ganze Woche was again the best-selling magazine in the country. It was the third best-selling general interest magazine with a circulation of 402,000 copies in 2010.

In 2016 the readership of Die Ganze Woche was reported as ranging between 1 and 1.3 million.

== See also ==
- List of magazines in Austria
