= Harald Gutzelnig =

Austrian non-fiction writer and computer programmer

Harald Gutzelnig (born 18 June 1956) is an Austrian editor, managing director, non-fictional author and software programmer. He lives in Perg. Gutzelnig and his wife Marianne founded the CDA Verlag.

== Life ==
After having finished his education in Pedagogy at the Pädagogische Hochschule (1976–1979) Gutzelnig was working as teacher at a Hauptschule in Upper Austria until 1993.

At the end of the 1980s he began programming an educational software for touch typing, named PC-Tipp-Trainer, and published it with a manual. Later this software was redesigned and renamed PC-Schreib and TippTop (four versions from 1992 to 1999, published by Data Becker).

After that he wrote a course for programming Turbo Pascal and several other books for beginners in electronic data processing.

In 1995 he and his wife Marianne Gutzelnig founded the CDA Verlag in Perg, Upper Austria, which publishes and distributes several computer magazines like CD Austria in Austria as well as PC News and PC User in the German-speaking countries Germany, Switzerland and Luxembourg.

== Works ==
- Turbo-Pascal, Eine runde Einführung in die Kunst des professionellen Programmierens, Wolfram's Fachverlag, 1. Auflage Version 5.5, 3-925328-02-5, Attenkirchen 1990, 2. Auflage Version 6.0, Attenkirchen 1991, ISBN 3-86033-111-6 (programming course introduction to Turbo Pascal for professional programming)
- Turbo Pascal Tools, Featuring Turbo enhancement toolkit, Version 1, Systhema-Verlag, München 1989, 3-89390-134-5, Version 2, Systhema-Verlag, München 1990, ISBN 3-89390-144-2
- As easy as, Das Superkalkulationsprogramm, Systhema-Verlag, München 1991, ISBN 3-89390-907-9
- Etikettenstar, Systhema-Verlag, München 1991, ISBN 3-89390-195-7 (label star, software for creating labels)
- Drucker-Utilities, Schöne Schriften für Nadeldrucker, Systhema Verlag, München 1991, ISBN 3-89390-135-3 (Printing utilities)
- Internationale Shareware-Hits, Systhema-Verlag, München 1991, ISBN 3-89390-370-4 (overview of international shareware)
- Harry's Spass am Lernen, Mathe-, Deutsch und Vokabeltrainer, Software, Systhema-Verlag, München 1992, ISBN 3-89390-869-2 Harry's fun with learning (mathematics German and vocabulary educational software)
- PC-Tipp-Trainer, Software, Systhema-Verlag, 1. Auflage München 1991, ISBN 3-89390-129-9, 2. Auflage München 1992, ISBN 3-89390-852-8
- Handbuch zu PC-Schreib (manual for PC-Schreib, educational software for touch typing), Verlag Rossipaul, München 1993, ISBN 3-87686-605-7
- Turbo-Pascal, Ein Programmierkurs für Einsteiger, München 1992, Deutscher Taschenbuchverlag (dtv) ISBN 3-423-50107-3 und BeckISBN 3-406-36807-7 ( Turbo Pascal programming course for beginners)
- Internationale Shareware, Marktübersicht und Leitfaden, München 1992, Deutscher Taschenbuchverlag (dtv) 3-423-50116-2 und Beck ISBN 3-406-36815-8
- TippTop 4.0, Medienkombination (Buch und Software-CD-ROM), Spielend einfach tippen lernen, 24 Lektionen und 26 Crash-Kurse, mit neuer deutscher Rechtschreibung, neues Kurssystem mit Fortschrittskontrolle, Data Becker, Düsseldorf 1999, ISBN 3-8158-6171-3 (Vorgängerversionen ab 1992)
- Peter Weibel (introduction), Harald Gutzelnig (author), M Derbort (author), J Entenebner (author), H Gutzelnig (author), Clemens Hüffel (editor), Anton Reiter (author and editor), Alexander Feiglstorfer (Illustrator), Handbuch neue Medien, CDA Verlag, Perg, 1. Auflage 2006 ISBN 978-3-200-00602-7, 2. Auflage ISBN 978-3-200-01367-4

== Literature ==
- Willing's press guide, Band 2, Western Europe, Willing Service, 2003 (English)
- Brinkman's alphabetische catalogus van boeken en verder in den boekhandel voorkomende artikelen, Band 2, Sijthoff, 2001 (Dutch)
