= The Vienna Review =

Former Austrian newspaper

- September 2011 issue
- Editor-in-Chief: Dardis McNamee
- Categories: News magazine
- Frequency: Monthly
- Circulation: 10,000
- Publisher: Falter Verlagsgesellschaft m.b.H
- First issue: September 2006
- Final issue: December 2013
- Country: Austria
- Based in: Vienna
- Language: English

The Vienna Review was a monthly English language newspaper based in Vienna, Austria, available in print and online. It was founded in 2006 by American journalist and director of the Vienna Journalism Institute Dardis McNamee. The paper's target audience was the permanent English-speaking community in Austria and Central Europe, as well as expatriates and tourists.

== Content ==
The Vienna Review started out as a student newspaper based in the Vienna campus of Webster University. Although Vienna was the focus, the paper made use of Austria's Central European location in covering both Western and Eastern European news and events, and seeking to provide a voice and a forum for Vienna's international community. Contributors to the paper included writing professionals, academics from think tanks in the area. The paper was a member of Project Syndicate, the Prague-based syndication service supported by the Open Society Foundations.

== Contribution ==
The Vienna Review was published in English on a monthly basis by the Vienna Review Publishing GmbH, since 2011 part of the Falter Verlagsgesellschaft mbH. The Vienna Review had a circulation of about 10,000 copies per month and was available by subscription, at public newsstands, in coffee houses, hotels and such places, and on several airlines. The magazine ceased being published in January 2014. The editorial team proceeded to found a new publication called Metropole – Vienna in English, published by Home Town Media GmbH, a publishing house founded in October 2015.
