= Bruno Meyer =

Swiss religious leader

Bruno Meyer (born 1938 in Schaffhausen) is a Swiss religious leader, founder of the Menorah church (Evangeliumsgemeinde Menorah "evangelical congregation Menorah"), a small fundamentalist Christian, evangelical congregation based in Wetzikon, canton of Zürich. He was convicted of rape and child sexual abuse in two cases in 2010.

== Menorah ==
Meyer founded the congregation in 1986, seceding from the "Schweizer Pfingstmission" SPM, where he had been active as a pastor. Gatherings of the congregation took place in Wetzikon, in Rottweil, Germany, and in Märstetten, canton of Thurgau. The Wetzikon group, as of 1999, had 190 regular participants (including children), and the Rottweil chapter about 25.

Meyer advocated a very strict, conservative lifestyle, denouncing television, radio, magazines, comics, most books, recorded music, as well as sports or any other distraction from focusing on Jesus Christ. He also denounces humour, jokes, puns and anything that may distract from a state of sobriety. He further denounces the celebration of Christmas, identified as a pagan practice, and generally discourages followers from attending ceremonies such as weddings or baptisms in other Christian communities. He advocates a strictly subordinate role of women, and a strictly authoritative approach to parenting, explained by the essentially sinful nature of children. However, even though not everyone followed these rules, they were still permitted to remain in the congregation, showing that Meyer had no absolute control over its members, which calls into question the congregation's definition of a cult. What also makes it difficult to define the congregation as a cult is that while Meyer was the main pastor, male members, most of them fathers, also regularly preached and held services.

After Meyer's arrest in 2009, the congregation lost about half of its 50 members. The remaining group has distanced itself from Meyer and renamed their congregation to Bachtel-Gemeinde.

== Arrest and conviction ==
In 2009, Meyer was arrested on suspicion of child sexual abuse. In August 2010, the Zürich state attorney filed charges against Meyer on the count of sexual abuse of a girl from within his congregation over a period of several years, beginning in 2006 when the victim was seven years old, until Meyer's arrest in 2009. He was convicted of multiple cases of rape of two girls, at the time aged seven and ten, in December 2010.

== See also ==
- Kwasizabantu
- Uriella
