= Universum (magazine) =

Austrian popular science magazine

- Categories: Science and nature magazine
- Frequency: Ten issue per a year
- Publisher: LW Media
- Company: LW Media
- Country: Austria
- Based in: Vienna
- Language: German

Universum was an Austrian popular science magazine published in German and based in Vienna, Austria, published from 1998 to 2019. The magazine was the only Austrian publication in the field of popular science, because Germany-published magazines dominatet the field in the country. The magazine was financially supported by the Austrian National Science Foundation.

In December 2019 the publishing house LW Media filed for bankruptcy and the magazine ceased publication.

== History and profile ==
Universum was established in 1998 as a joint venture of the national public broadcaster ORF and LW Media, a subsidiary of the N.O Pressehaus. The editorial office of Universum was based in Vienna.

The magazine was published ten times a year covering science and nature stories. The subtitle of the magazine was "the most beautiful magazine of Austria", reflecting its preference for covering non-conflictual topics.

Oliver Lehmann was the founding editor-in-chief until 2007 and then as co-publisher until 2013. The last editor-in-chief was Martin Kugler.

Universum had a circulation of about 70,000 copies in 2002. In 2007 the magazine sold 52,000 copies. Its circulation was 42,000 copies in 2010.

== See also ==
- List of magazines in Austria
