= Schreibkraft =

Schreibkraft is an Austrian literary magazine, which was founded in 1998 by the Literature Council of the Forum Stadtpark in Graz (Styria). The magazine prints feature articles. Since 1999 the edition schreibkraft is the publisher. Schreibkraft appears twice a year.

Every issue has a specific topic. The essays and feature articles are chosen by the five editors (Hermann Götz, Robert Hutter, Hannes Luxbacher, Andreas R. Peternell, Werner Schandor). In addition, the magazine publishes some narrative texts and book reviews; the latter review primarily books from small publishing houses.

Published authors stem from Austria, Switzerland and Germany. E.g. the following authors have published in Schreibkraft: Bettina Balàka, Moritz Baßler, Julian Blunk, Helwig Brunner, Thomas E. Brunnsteiner, Martin Büsser], Ann Cotten, Julius Deutschbauer & Gerhard Spring, Hans Durrer, Klaus Ebner, Helmut Eisendle, Bernhard Flieher, Franzobel, Harald A. Friedl, Brigitte Fuchs, Egyd Gstättner, Wolf Haas, Sonja Harter, Klaus_Händl, Christian Ide Hintze, Paulus Hochgatterer, Elfriede Jelinek, Ralf B. Korte, Christian Loidl, Friederike Mayröcker, Gisela Müller, Andreas Okopenko, Andreas R. Peternell, Claus Philipp, Peter Piller, Rosemarie Poiarkov, Wolfgang Pollanz, Birgit Pölzl, Manfred Prisching, Peter Rosei, Werner Schandor, Ferdinand Schmatz, Katja Schmid, Helmuth Schönauer, Franz Schuh, Werner Schwab, Gudrun Sommer, Enno Stahl, Christine Werner, Serjoscha Wiemer, and Christiane Zintzen.

== See also ==
- List of magazines in Austria
