= Michael Fleischhacker =

Austrian journalist

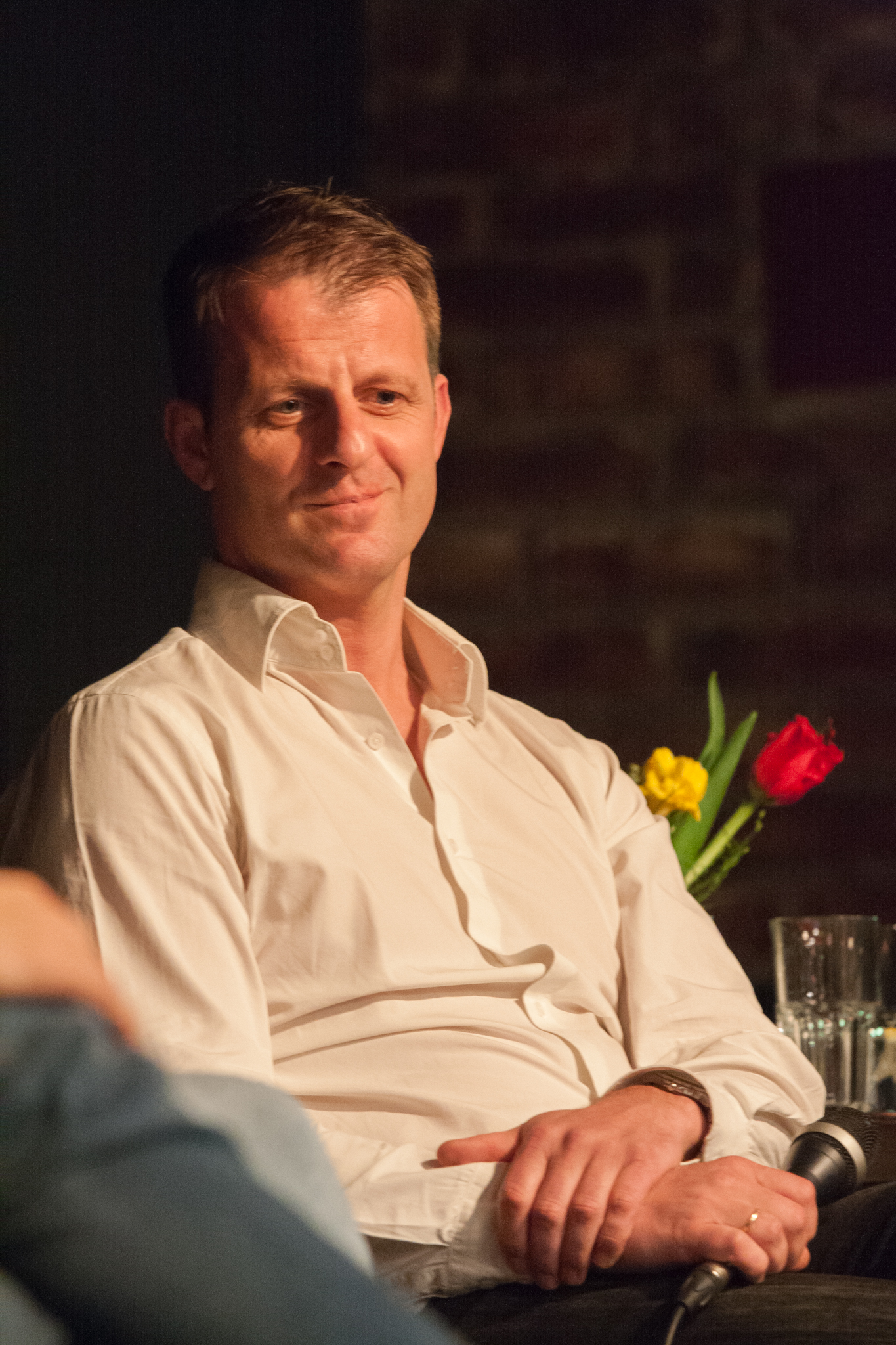
Michael Fleischhacker Austrian journalist and television presenter.2016

Michael Fleischhacker (born 26 May 1969 in Friesach, Carinthia) is an Austrian journalist. He was director and editor-in-chief of Austrian daily Die Presse from 2004 until 2012.

== Early life ==
Fleischhacker was raised in Sankt Lambrecht in Styria. He graduated from Admont Abbey High School and studied theology, philosophy and German philology in Graz and didn't graduate.

== Newspaper career ==
In April 1991 Fleischhacker worked for Kleinen Zeitung as editor for foreign politics. 1994 he became editor in the editor-in-chief's office, from 1995 until 1997 he was managing editor and 1998/99 he became deputy editor-in-chief. In addition, as publishing director he was responsible for strategic development and new media.

In 2000 he joined Austrian daily Der Standard and was managing editor until 2001. From 2002 he worked at Austrian daily Die Presse and became editor-in-chief and chief executive in 2004. In October 2012 he left Die Presse and became freelance journalist and contributed regularly in various daily Austrian newspapers.

In July 2014 he joined the Austrian private network ServusTV and became News presenter of Talk im Hangar-7.

From 2014 he worked for NZZ Österreich of Austria and was primarily responsible for establishing an online presence. Later on he became chief editor and co-chief executive.

== Personal life ==
Fleischhacker is father of five children.

== Publications ==
- Die Zeitung : Ein Nachruf (in German), Christian Brandstätter Verlag, 2014, ISBN 978-3-85033-655-0
- Politikerbeschimpfung : Das Ende der 2. Republik (in German), Ecowin Verlag, 2008, ISBN 978-3-902404-63-3
- Der Schutz des Menschen vor sich selbst : Eine Ethik zum Leben (in German), Verlag Styria, 2002, ISBN 3-222-12954-1
- Wien, 4. Februar 2000 oder Die Wende zur Hysterie (in German), Czernin Verlag, 2001, ISBN 978-3-7076-0112-1
- Johannes Paul II. - der Wasserträger Gottes (in German), Verlag Styria, 1998, ISBN 3-222-13004-3
