= Boarder's Buddy =

Snowboarding magazine

Boarder's Buddy is a freeride magazine for snowboarders and skiers. It was published by eight Austrian editors and graphic designers. Boarder's Buddy presents the freeride areas in Austria in an independent way with the aim to point out each spot's assets. Every spot is given with detailed graphics, photos and texts.
