= Österreich (newspaper) =

Austrian daily newspaper

- Type: Daily newspaper
- Format: Tabloid
- Owner: Mediengruppe Österreich GmbH
- Founder: Wolfgang Fellner
- Publisher: Wolfgang Fellner
- Editor: Wolfgang Fellner
- Founded: 1 September 2006; 20 years ago
- Political alignment: Conservatism
- Language: German
- Headquarters: Vienna
- Country: Austria
- Website: www.oe24.at

Österreich (German pronunciation: [ˈøːstəʁaɪ̯ç], lit. 'Austria') is a national Austrian daily newspaper, based in Vienna.

== History and profile ==
Österreich, a German language newspaper, was first published in Vienna by Helmut and Wolfgang Fellner on 1 September 2006. Wolfgang Fellner, the owner, publisher and editor of the daily, also launched other Austrian publications, including News magazine. Mediengruppe Österreich GmbH is the owner of the daily.

Österreich is published in tabloid format and is described as a magazine-like paper. The paper is like USA Today in terms of its editorial design. In weekends, the paper provides three supplements, TV and people, lifestyle, and a regional supplement. The daily targets the young adults from 18 to 35.

The 2006 circulation of Österreich was 159,306 copies. In the period of 2007-2008 the daily had the readership of 9.34%. Its circulation for the first half of 2007 was 120,510 copies whereas for the same period in 2008 it was 129,680 copies. In 2010, the paper had a circulation of 410,000 copies.

== OE24.TV ==
Logo of oe24.TV

Logo of the internet portal oe24

On 16 August 2016, Österreich told the press that they would start a TV channel, in cooperation with CNN, on 22 September 2016. The channel is called oe24TV and has a logo similar to the one used by the online version of the newspaper. As of February 2025, the channel has more than 330,000 subscribers on YouTube.

== See also ==
- List of newspapers in Austria
