= Menora =

Menora may refer to:

- Menora (dance), a Siamese folk dance
- Menora (planthopper), a genus of insects placed incertae sedis in the family Flatidae
- Menora, Western Australia, a suburb of Perth
- Menora v. Illinois High School Association, a 1982 court case
- Menora Tunnel, a tunnel located in the state of Perak, Malaysia

== See also ==
- Menorah (disambiguation)
