= ORF nachlese =

Austrian TV program magazine

- Categories: ORF TV program guide
- Frequency: Monthly
- First issue: 1979
- Company: ORF Marketing Service GmbH & Co KG
- Country: Austria
- Based in: Vienna
- Language: German

ORF nachlese was an Austrian programme guide monthly magazine for ORF.

== History ==
It was first published in 1979.

According to the Austrian Circulation Control (ÖAK), the print run of ORF nachlese was an average of 106,391 copies in the first half of 2014. Of these, around 71,100 copies were sold. ORF nachlese is therefore among the 25 magazines with the highest circulation in Austria.

According to the Working Group on Media Analyses MA 13/14 – Daily Newspapers Total, ORF nachlese has 428,000 readers per issue in Austria. This corresponds to a reach of 5.9% across all of Austria.
