= Max Friedländer (journalist) =

German-Austrian journalist (1829–1872)

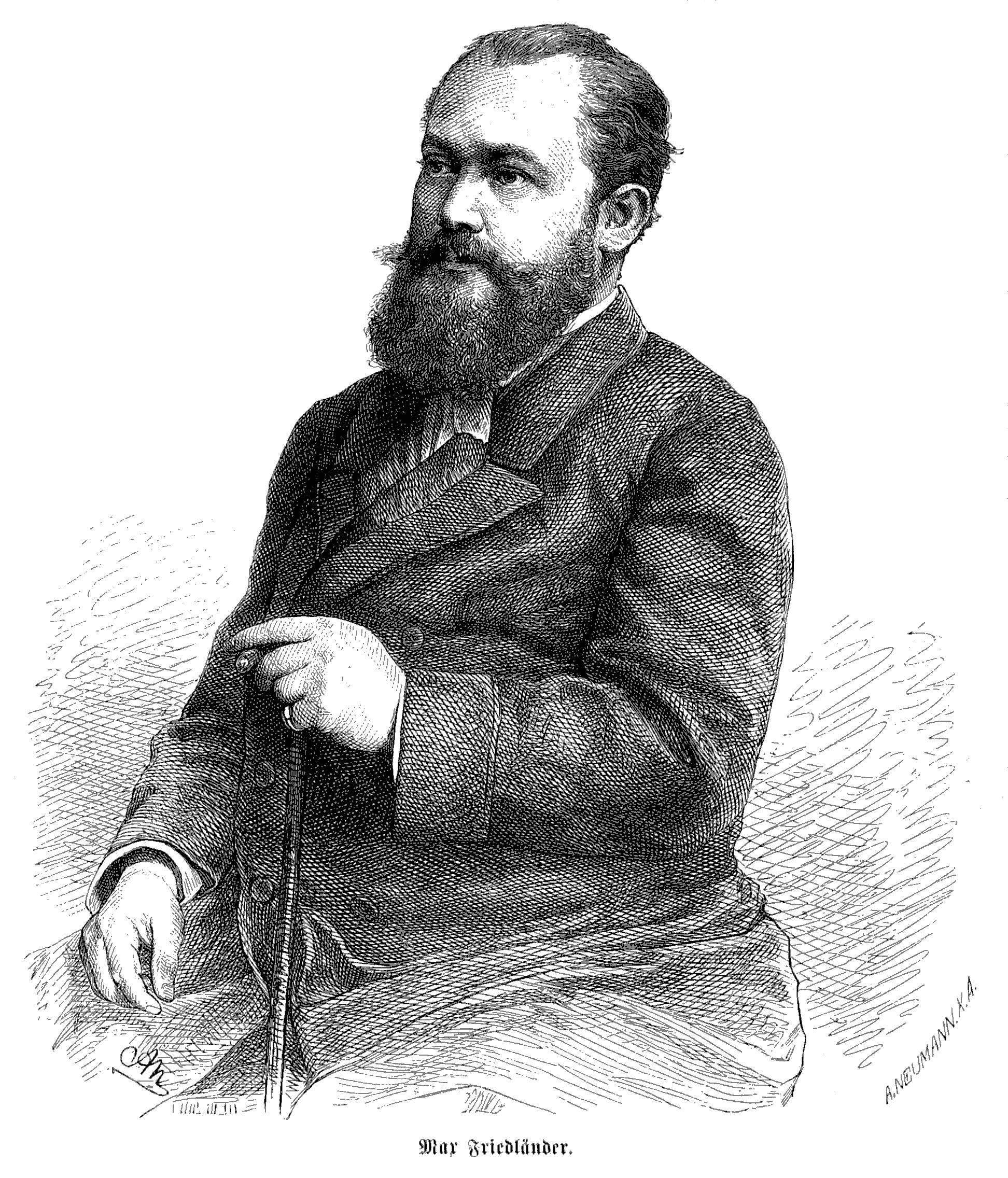
Max Friedländer (journalist).

Max Friedländer (18 June 1829, Pless, Upper Silesia - 20 April 1872, Nice) was a German-Austrian journalist.

After studying law like his cousin Ferdinand Lasalle at the universities of Berlin, Breslau, and Heidelberg, he became assessor at the city court of Breslau, and while holding this position he published his book on copyright, Der Ausländische und Einheimische Rechtsschutz Gegen Nachdruck und Nachbildung, Leipzig, 1857. He began his journalistic career in 1856 by contributing to the Vienna Die Presse, and soon afterward moved to Vienna to become a member of the editorial staff of that paper, his articles on political economy and finance attracting the attention of influential statesmen and financiers.

After the Italian war Friedländer conducted a successful journalistic campaign against the policy of Schmerling, and advocated strongly the granting of a liberal constitution. In September, 1864, he founded the Neue Freie Presse, of which publication he remained editor-in-chief until his death.
