= Die Aula =

Far-right Austrian magazine

- Frequency: Bi-monthly
- Publisher: Aula-Verlag
- Founded: 1951
- Final issue: June 2018
- Company: FAV Association of Academics
- Country: Austria
- Based in: Graz
- Language: German
- Website: Die Aula

Die Aula (lit. 'The Hall') was a far-right Austrian magazine. It was started as monthly, but later became a bi-monthly magazine. The magazine existed between 1951 and June 2018.

== History and profile ==
Die Aula was established in 1951. It was owned by the FAV Association of Academics. Its publisher was the Aula-Verlag in Graz. In the initial stage it was monthly, but later was made bi-monthly.

The magazine was the mouthpiece of the National-Liberal Students' Association of Austria. It had close links to Freedom Party of Austria (FPÖ).

The last issue of Die Aula was published in June 2018, with a new magazine to be published after the summer. The new magazine, Die Neue Aula was shut down after one issue in 2019 because of financial reasons.

== See also ==
- List of magazines in Austria
