= Metropole – Vienna in English =

Former English-language Austrian magazine

- October 2015 issue
- Editor-in-chief: Dardis McNamee
- Categories: Expat City Magazine for Vienna
- Frequency: quarterly (since 2019), previously 10 issues a year (monthly except for two double issues)
- Circulation: 30,000
- Publisher: Home Town Media GmbH
- Founder: Dardis McNamee & Margaret Childs
- First issue: October 2015
- Final issue: Winter 2021
- Country: Austria
- Based in: Vienna
- Language: English
- Website: metropole.at
- ISSN: 2518-6388

Metropole was an English-language quarterly magazine targeted at English-speaking expatriates and internationals in Vienna, Austria. Metropole’s motto “Don’t be a stranger” captured its main goal: to help its readers get acquainted with Austria and its capital Vienna in particular. The magazine ceased publication at the end of 2021.

== Distribution/Circulation ==
The magazine had a circulation of about 30,000 copies, on sale at more than 500 locations within Austria: at newsstands, train stations, airports and bookshops. It was also available as a print or digital subscription and digitally on flights of Lufthansa and Austrian Airlines.

In addition, the magazine targeted its readership directly through a corporate subscription model to reach the employees of international organizations and companies.

Metropole latterly appeared quarterly in March, June, September and December. The media house also provided online coverage in English on things happening in Vienna and Austria, a weekly newsletter and monthly events for subscribers and internationals.

== Contents ==
Each issue had a thematic focus that defined the main sections, such as the Editorials, the Cover Story and the Quotes, Stats & Numbers. Apart from that, Metropole features event tips, interesting locations, and portrayed Vienna’s city life and neighborhoods (Grätzl). Besides contributions by regular authors, each issue featured guest-contributors in line with the main topic. The magazine wasn't intended be regarded as just a tourist guide, but as a way to help those who were new to Vienna, find their way in the city.

Digital content featured in the print magazine was only accessible to subscribers, but coverage of current news online and the event calendar was available for everyone to read.

== History ==
In October 2015, Margaret Childs and Dardis McNamee co-founded Home Town Media GmbH and published the first issue of Metropole, titled “We Built This City”, focusing on how internationality shaped Austria and Vienna and continues to do so.

In 2018, Metropole initiated the transnational and intercultural reportage project “Empire to Republic.” Using contemporary and archival photographs, original reporting and first-hand experiences, the project sought to tell the story of the region 100 years after the dissolution of the Habsburg Empire in 1918. The stories created by over 50 journalists from 13 Central and European countries appeared monthly in Metropole and in partnering news outlets. In 2019, Home Town Media published the book From Empire to Republic, a compilation of the project’s best reporting.

In 2019, Metropole changed from appearing monthly (10 issues a year) to quarterly, with more frequent online content offered as part of this relaunch.

In 2021, Metropole had planned to expand to new cities, starting with other European cities. The goal would have been to build a city magazine that was hyper-local, helping the globally mobile live anywhere like they were born there.

The founders and many of the contributors to the magazine were formerly associated with The Vienna Review, a previous English-language monthly, which ceased publication at the end of 2013.

== Events and other products ==
Metropole regularly organized events for its readers as well as startups, companies and international influencers. The aim was for guests to exchange ideas and visions, expand their network and get a sense of the possibilities that working and living in Austria offers.

Home Town Media, Metropole's parent company and publishing house, also published Survival Guides for English speakers in Vienna. The Vienna Survival Guide for Health, published in 2017, provides a detailed overview of health care, doctors, insurance, and medical treatment in Vienna and Austria. The Vienna Survival Guide for Housing, published in 2018, was an easy-to-understand guide for the city’s real estate, with a breakdown of Vienna’s neighborhoods and explanations of how to rent and buy property in Austria as an expat. In 2019, the Vienna Survival Guide for Education followed, covering school enrollment, studying and further education in Vienna and the rest of Austria.
