= Menorah memorial (Mariupol) =

Memorial in Mariupol, Ukraine

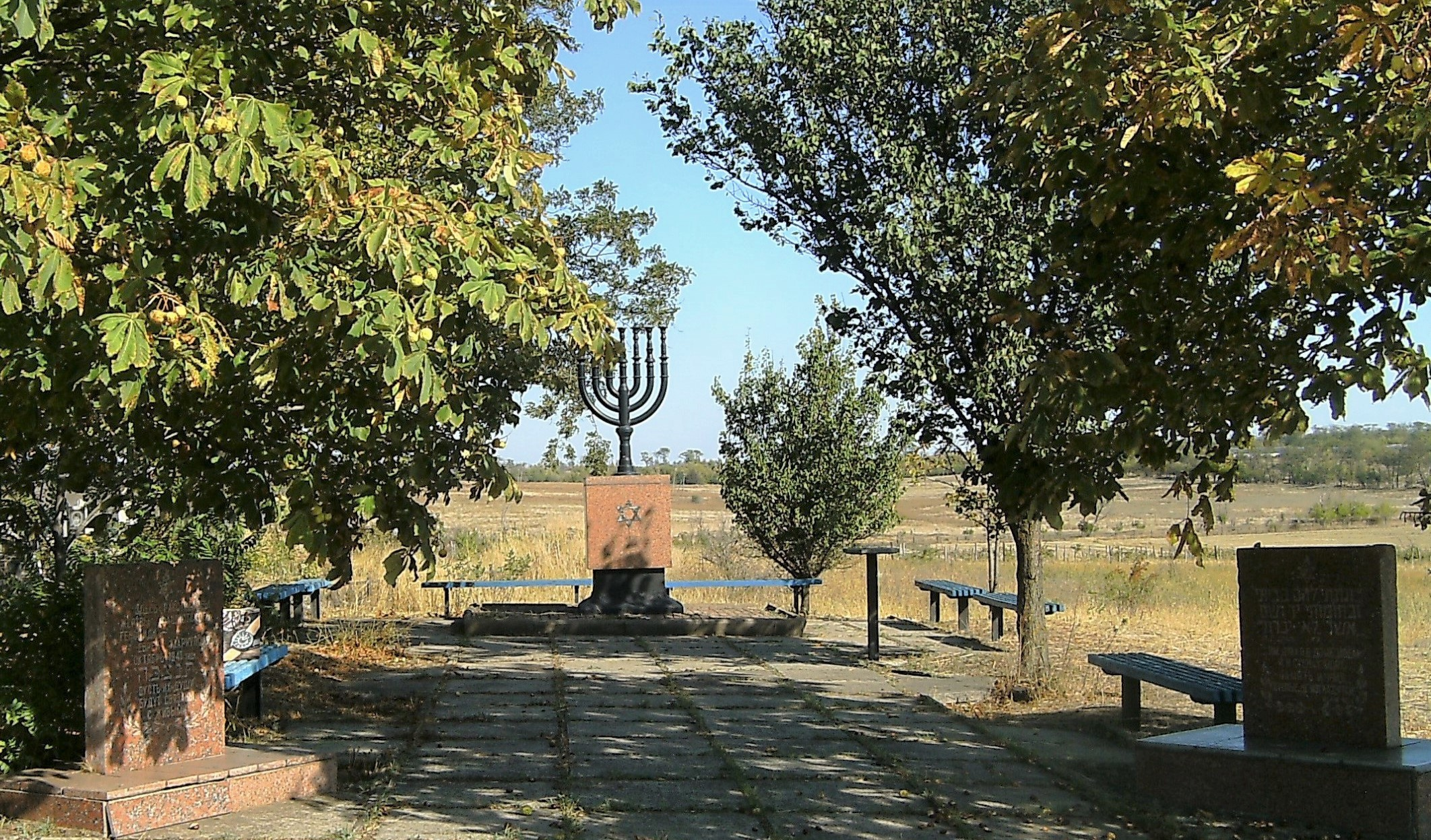
Menorah Memorial (Mariupol)

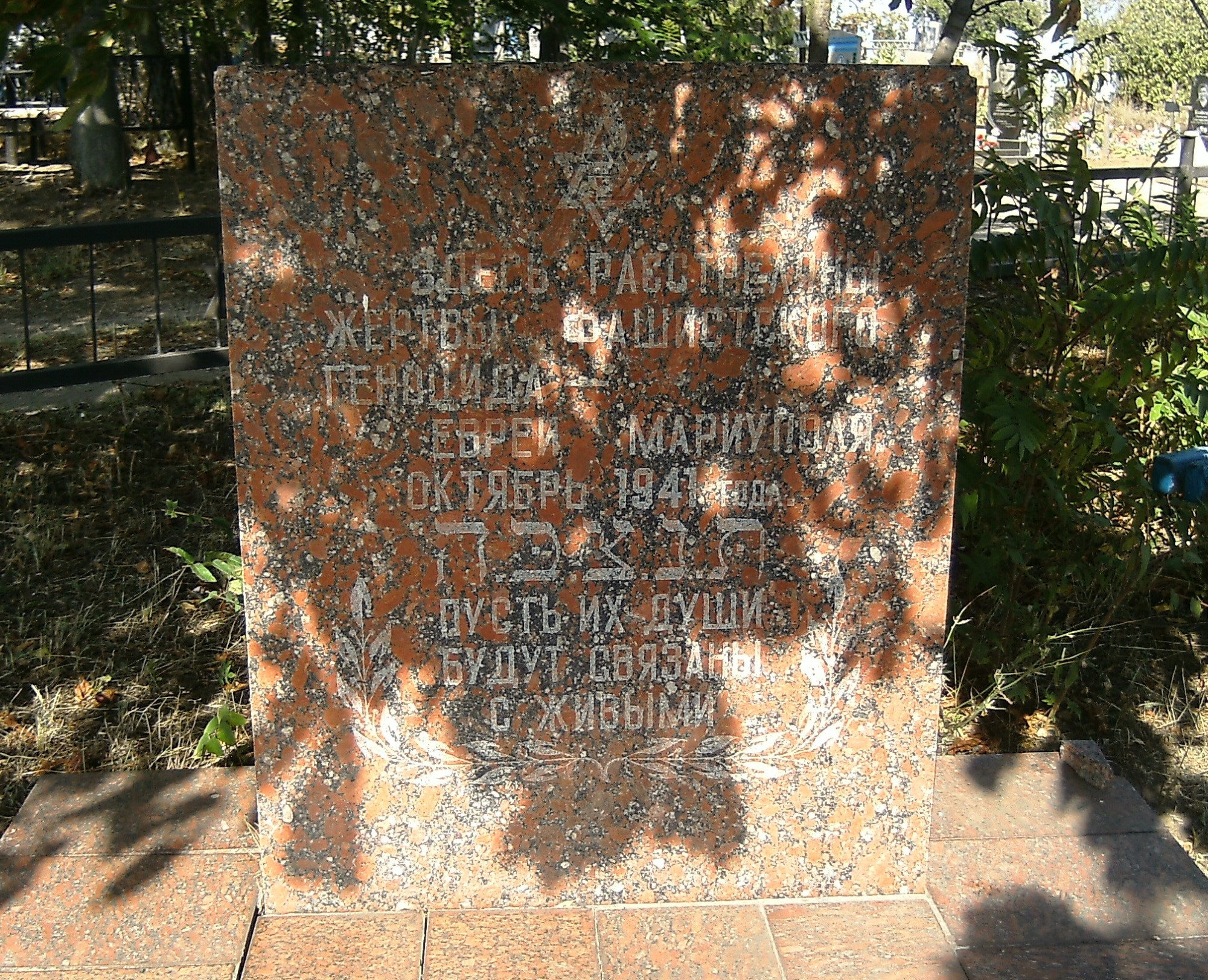
Menorah Memorial (Mariupol)

The Menorah memorial, in Mariupol, Ukraine is a cultural property of a historical place indexed in the Ukrainian heritage register (Special Awards: Єврейська спадщина) under the reference 99-142-3901.

It is located on the east side of the city of Mariupol. The memorial is located on the place where more than 8,000 Mariupol Jews were shot on October 20 and 21, 1941. By 1939, 10,444 Jews lived in Mariupol. There is a menorah in the center of the memorial. On the pedestal is a Star of David. On both sides of the monument there are memorial steles with inscriptions: "Victims of the fascist genocide – the Jews of Mariupol were shot here. Let their souls be connected with the living" and "I will give them—within the walls of my house— a memorial" Isaiah 56.5.
