= Gewinn =

Austrian business magazine

- Logo of Gewinn
- Categories: Business magazine
- Frequency: Monthly (11 times a year)
- Publisher: Wailand & Waldstein GmbH
- Founded: 1982; 44 years ago
- Company: Wailand & Waldstein GmbH
- Country: Austria
- Based in: Vienna
- Language: German
- Website: www.gewinn.com

Gewinn is a business magazine published in Austria and based in Vienna. The magazine has been in circulation in 1982.

== History and profile ==
Gewinn was launched in 1982 by Wailand & Waldstein GmbH. Georg Waldstein and Georg Wailand are the owners of the magazine which is published by Wailand & Waldstein company. The magazine has its headquarters in Vienna.

Gewinn, published 11 times per year, has the following main sections: Money and stock market, management and careers, IT and innovations, real estate, law and taxes and leisure and lifestyle. Since 1985 it provides its subscribers with a supplement, Gewinn extra. The magazine develops several rankings in regard to Austrian business institutes and figures.

Michael Fembek served as the editor-in-chief of the magazine from 2000 to 2007.

== Circulation ==
In the late 1980s Gewinn became a serious competitor to another Austrian business magazine, Trend. Gewinn sold 65,000 copies in 2003 and 62,000 copies in the first quarter of 2004. Its 2005 circulation was 60,462 copies. In 2006 the magazine had a circulation of 95,000 copies. For the first half of 2007 the magazine's circulation was 53,777 copies, whereas it was 55,453 copies for the same period in 2008. The 2010 circulation of the magazine was 76,000 copies. The magazine was read by 275,000 people in the period of 2010–2011. During the same period the magazine had a circulation of 80,254 copies.

== See also ==
List of magazines in Austria
