= Kwasizabantu =

South African non-denominational church

Kwasizabantu Mission
- Abbreviation: KSB
- Formation: 1970
- Founder: Erlo Hartwig Stegen
- Type: Non-denominational Christian mission
- Purpose: Religious, educational, charitable
- Headquarters: KwaZulu-Natal, South Africa
- Region served: International
- Website: ksb.org.za

Kwasizabantu (also KwaSizabantu, Kwa Sizabantu), meaning "where people are helped", is a non-denominational church mission originating in South Africa, which has grown to include centres in several countries.

This mission station is situated on a farm of 550 hectares between Greytown and KwaDukuza (also known as Stanger) in KwaZulu-Natal, and is currently one of the largest mission stations in Africa. The Mission has a few non-profit initiatives, as well as some successful commercial enterprises which fund its activities.

== Current Structure and Operations ==
Today, Kwasizabantu operates as a largely self-sustaining organization with a diverse portfolio of activities in multiple countries.

=== Nonprofit Initiatives ===
==== Radio Khwezi ====
Established in 1995, this community radio station broadcasts religious content and community programs. It is available on FM 90.5 and 107.7 in the KwaZulu-Natal Midlands region and online worldwide. Radio Khwezi broadcasts a variety of programs aimed at informing and edifying the community. The Sunday services of Kwasizabantu Mission are broadcast live from 11h00 South African time.

==== Emseni Care Centre ====
Opened in August 2006, it provides free care and counselling to HIV and AIDS patients. Some reports claim that patients have fully recovered and are HIV-free today, though such claims remain disputed."Articles by or about Kwasizabantu Mission". KwaSizabantu Mission. 20 March 2014.

=== Commercial Enterprises ===
==== aQuellé Water ====
One of the mission's most successful commercial ventures, aQuellé produces and markets bottled water locally and internationally."aQuellé".

==== Saverite supermarket ====
A supermarket on the premises with its own bakery and deli where produce from other mission run enterprises can be purchased.

==== Agricultural Projects ====
The mission operates 8.5 hectares of greenhouses for hydroponic sweet peppers and extensive avocado farms. Produce is packaged on-site for major retailers such as Woolworths, Checkers, and Spar."Kwasizabantu - the place where people are helped". 23 July 2014. Some of the produce is exported, and dairy products are marketed through the Bonlé brand."Bonlé". bonle.co.za.

=== Educational Institutions ===
The mission is affiliated with a primary and secondary school, Domino Service School, and a teacher-training college, Cedar International Academy.

==== Domino Servite School ====
Founded in 1986, is a private co-educational academic Christian school that caters to both day scholars and boarders in pre-primary, primary and high school.

==== Cedar International Academy ====
Founded in 1994, as Cedar Training College and later Cedar College of Education is a teacher training college. between 2002 and 2015 it operated as a satellite campus of first Potchefstroom University for Christian Higher Education and later North West University. currently the college operates as Cedar International Academy and is an independent Private Higher Education Institution providing a HEQC accredited Bachelor of Education (BEd) program in Foundation Phase Teaching

== History ==
Kwasizabantu Mission was founded in 1970 by Erlo Hartwig Stegen (1935–2023). Stegen had been a travelling evangelist among the Zulu population of Natal since the 1950s up to 1970. In 1966–67, Stegen's efforts culminated in a revival, accompanied by mass conversions and miraculous healings. In 1970, its base was established at a place called KwaSizabantu (Zulu for "the place of help for people," or "the place where people are helped"). This became the ministry's eponym. Academic research indicates that the revival among the Zulus is close to other Protestant revivals.

The founder of the KwaSizabantu Mission in Kranskop, the Reverend Erlo Hartwig Stegen, was named co-recipient of a major international award — the Robert W. Pierce Award for Christian Service — by World Vision International on 9 December 2007. In 2013 Rev EH Stegen was awarded the Chancellor's Medal by the North-West University (NWU) for his humanitarian work among poor rural communities.

== Allegations of abuse ==
On 19 September 2020, News24 released the results of a seven-month investigation into allegations of wrongdoing at Kwasizabantu Mission. The alleged abuses included rape and sexual assault (also against children), exploitation of workers, and money laundering. (DW) A key figure in the reporting was survivor Erika Bornman who would later publish an account of her experiences titled Mission of Malice. Kwasizabantu replied, denying the allegations as a "smear campaign."

As a reaction, the Commission for the Promotion and Protection of the Rights of Cultural, Religious and Linguistic Communities (CRL Rights Commission), the KwaZulu-Natal local authorities, and the South African Human Rights Commission announced investigations. Moreover, multiple brands, organisations, and events terminate or suspend their commercial partnerships with Kwasizabantu. Woolworths halted buying fruit and vegetable from Ensemi Farming (Source), with Spar, Massmart and Food Lover's Market following suit. Next to agricultural products, the boycott centred around the recall of aQuellé bottled water. On 25 September 2020, the Absa Cape Epic bike race dropped aQuellé as a sponsor.

In July 2023, the CRL Rights Commission released the findings of its investigation. It concluded that the teachings, principles and rules of the community were within the scope of the freedom of religion. Moreover, the Commission emphasised that criminal allegations (such as rape or money laundering) fell beyond its competence and should be made to the police. However, the Commission did confirm that a member of the mission was serving jail time for rape that he had committed at Kwasizabantu; that corporal punishment had been practised but had ceased; and that virginity testing had been conducted with the permission of parents but now had ceased. Kwasizabantuwas ordered to apologise to the survivors.

Following the release of the CRL Rights Commission’s report, some individuals who had lodged complaints against Kwasizabantu leaders appealed the findings of the Commission. On 15 December 2025, the Commission and the applicants issued a joint press statement which announced the withdrawal of the 2023 published report, the withdrawal of the applicant's appeal, the waiver of any claim for damages arising from the review proceedings, and their agreement to pursue a renewed, survivor-centred engagement framework.
