= Neue Vorarlberger Tageszeitung =

Daily newspaper in Austria

- Type: Daily newspaper
- Owner(s): Vorarlberg Media
- Publisher: Russmedia Verlag
- Founded: 1972; 53 years ago
- Language: German
- Headquarters: Bregenz
- Country: Austria
- Sister newspapers: Vorarlberger Nachrichten
- Website: www.neue.at

Neue Vorarlberger Tageszeitung (simply NEUE) is a German language regional newspaper published in Bregenz, Austria, which has been in circulation since 1972.

== History and profile ==
NEUE was established in 1972. The paper has its headquarters in Bregenz and serves for Vorarlberg. It is a small format boulevard newspaper. The paper is owned by the Vorarlberg Media which is also the owner of another daily Vorarlberger Nachrichten. It is published from Tuesday to Sunday by the Russmedia Verlag and has an independent political stance.

== Circulation ==
In November 2001 NEUE sold 7,426 copies. Its circulation was 20,136 copies in 2002. In 2007 the paper had a circulation of 13,000 copies. Its average circulation was 8,346 copies from Tuesdays to Saturdays and 30,485 copies on Sundays in 2010.
