= Wiener Zeitung =

Austrian newspaper (1703–present)

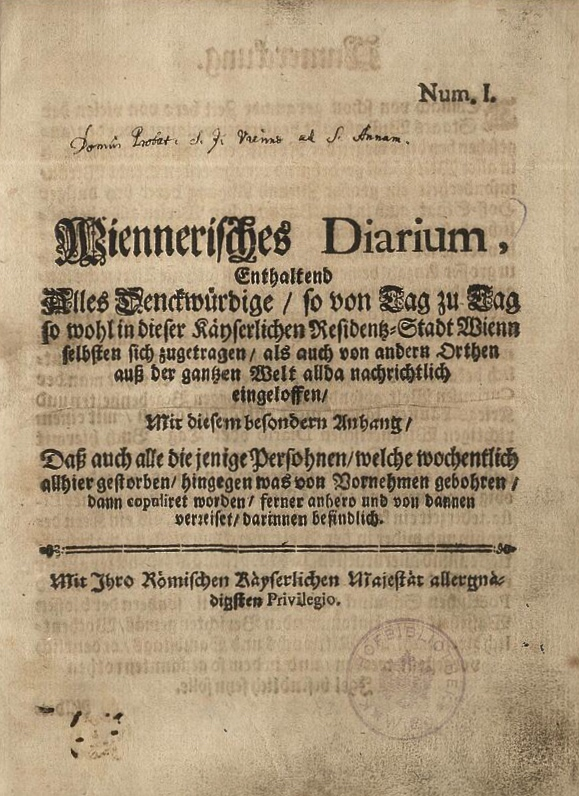
- Title page of the first issue of Wiennerisches Diarium, later Wiener Zeitung
- Type: Biweekly newspaper (1703–1813); Daily newspaper (1813–1940, 1945–2023)
- Format: Broadsheet
- Owner(s): Government of Austria, represented by the Chancellor
- Editor-in-chief: Katharina Schmidt & Sebastian Pumberger (interim)
- Launched: 8 August 1703; 323 years ago (as Wiennerisches Diarium)
- Ceased publication: 30 June 2023 (print)
- Language: German
- Headquarters: Vienna
- Country: Austria
- Website: wienerzeitung.at

Wiener Zeitung (German pronunciation: [ˈviːnɐ ˈtsaɪtʊŋ]) is an Austrian newspaper. First published as the Wiennerisches Diarium in 1703, it is one of the oldest newspapers in the world. Until April 2023, it was the official gazette of the government of Austria for legally-required announcements, such as company registrations and was also the official publishing body for laws and executive orders until 2004.

Considered a newspaper of record, as of 2002, Wiener Zeitung was among the four Austrian daily quality newspapers beside the right-liberal Die Presse, the left-liberal Der Standard and the Christian-liberal and conservative Salzburger Nachrichten. The newspaper ended its daily print edition on 30 June 2023, becoming an online publication. The launch of the digital platform won the 2023 European Publishing Award for a “Launch or Relaunch” of a publication in digital form.

== History and profile ==
=== 1703–1856: Founding and private ownership ===
Johann Baptist Schönwetter received a privilegium impressorium for a weekly newspaper on 10 January 1702. Launched as Wiennerisches Diarium, the newspaper's first issue was published on 8 August 1703. The title page described the paper as "contain[ing] everything notable which occurs from day to day in this town of Vienna, as well as in other places all over the world", including death notices in the city and aristocratic births, marriages, and visits to and departures from Vienna. Schönwetter owned the newspaper and was its editor-in-chief and printer until 1722, when he was succeeded by Johann Peter van Ghelen.

It became considered the official mouthpiece of the Imperial Court due to its being supplied information directly and exclusively by the Court. The paper was published bi-weekly, usually running around eight pages in length. Supplements and other extensive reports were published during war time, mainly about Austria, the Franco-Austrian Alliance, and their mutual enemy Prussia. Field journals and diaries from the Austrian army were the main sources used by the paper, reporting on officer promotions, troop deployments and other public announcements pertaining to the war, mostly of local interest. Around 15 per cent of reports were about battles and armed conflicts while 3 per cent were about war crimes committed by Prussian troops.

Since 1780, the paper was known as Wiener Zeitung (meaning Viennese newspaper in English) and in 1810 it became the official government newspaper. On 1 October 1813, it began publishing daily.

=== 1857–2020: Government ownership ===
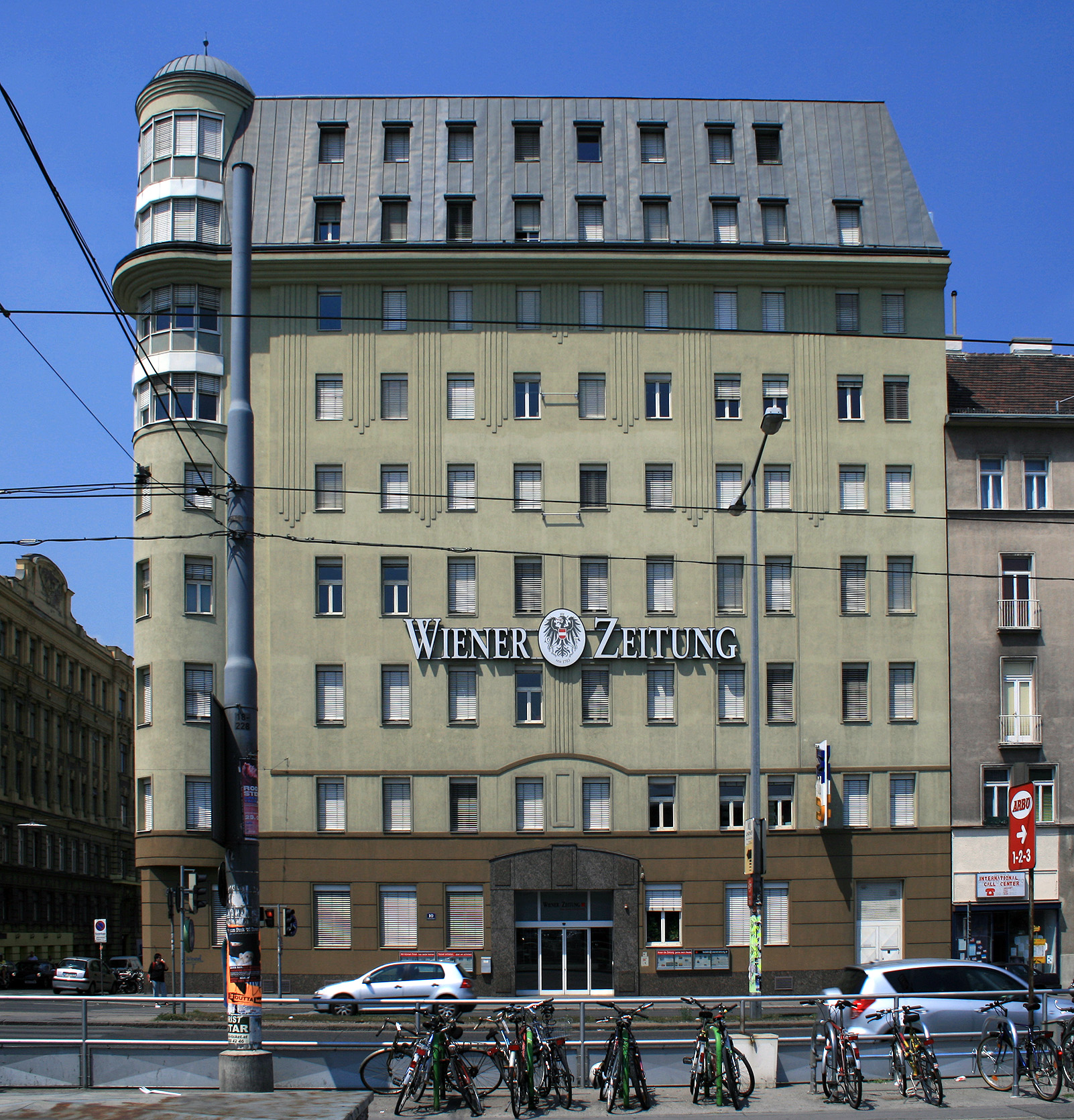
The former premises, in the centre of Vienna, as seen in 2007

In 1857 the government acquired the paper and it was printed until 1997 by the Austrian State Printing Office. The newspaper was closed by the Nazis after the Anschluss: in February 1939 the editorial part was removed, and in February 1940 the remaining official journal closed entirely. The first edition after World War II appeared on 21 September 1945. The number of copies sold has grown from 4,500 in 1855 to an estimated 24,000 today. In 1998 the paper was transferred to a GmbH (Limited Liability Company), which is owned by the Austrian Government.

Wiener Zeitung is also the official publication used by the Government of the Republic of Austria for formal announcements. Such announcements, for example, civil service vacancies and changes in the commercial register, are printed in the Official Journal insert of Wiener Zeitung. Until 2004 it also used to publish the official version of newly passed Austrian laws. Today the governmental version of newly passed statutes and treaties are officially published in the Internet, the law gazette thus is not available in a printed version anymore.

Until 2009 Wiener Zeitung's editor-in-chief was Andreas Unterberger, before being replaced by Reinhard Göweil. While Unterberger hired mostly outspoken conservative columnists, the paper returned to its liberal position under Reinhard Göweil.

=== 2021–present: Closure of daily print edition ===
The Austrian government is widely criticized among entrepreneurs because they are legally required to publish certain legal announcements, such as shareholder meeting conventions and changes of the commercial register in the Wiener Zeitung and therefore have to pay certain fees, although publications are also done through the Internet. Entrepreneurs and private newspapers argue, alleging anti-competitive measures, that the newspaper is financed through these mandatory fees. The Austrian Supreme Court dismissed claims on this matter. The issue is even more controversial since today the only authentic source of Austrian statutory law is the Internet, whereas business publications also have to be announced through Wiener Zeitung.

In March 2021, the Austrian government led by Chancellor Sebastian Kurz proposed a law that would no longer require companies to pay to publish public announcements and changes to commercial registry in the paper's print edition, citing rules from the European Union that allowed such corporate information to be published digitally. The advertisements comprised the majority of the newspaper's revenue. A decision of the European Court of Justice is pending.

Walter Hämmerle resigned as editor-in-chief, a position he had held since 2018, at the end of 2022, when he felt it had become clear that the newspaper would be restructured. Judith Belfkih and Thomas Seifert became editors-in-chief on 1 January 2023. Hämmerle remained as a journalist, but announced on 21 April 2023 that he and the newspaper had mutually terminated his contract, beginning 1 May 2023.

"Some fear that the government just wants to keep the Wiener Zeitung brand with its 320-year-old history, while nobody knows what the future publication will look like — whether it will still be serious journalism."

— Mathias Ziegler, vice managing editor

On 27 April 2023, Wiener Zeitung announced an end to its daily print run. Going forward, the paper will be printed a minimum 10 times a year depending on available funds. The paper also announced plans to establish a media hub, a content agency and a training centre for journalists. At this time, the paper had a 20,000 weekday circulation, with about twice as much on weekends. Almost half of the newspaper's over 200 employees, 40 of whom are journalists, could be laid off due to the change, according to its trade union. After the announcement, several hundred people took to the streets in Vienna to protest the government's move.

On 30 June 2023, it ceased its daily printing. Wiener Zeitung intends to continue online with a monthly print run and an editorial staff of 20 employees. Katharina Schmidt, formerly product development for Wiener Zeitung, and Sebastian Pumberger, previously working on the digital form of Profil, were announced as interim editors-in-chief the same day.

== Reputation as oldest daily newspaper ==
At the end of its daily printing, Wiener Zeitung described itself as "the world's longest-running daily newspaper still in print". Gazzetta di Mantova (1664) is also attributed as the oldest daily newspaper still in print; Wiener Zeitung stated in its final daily issue that the title would be taken up by Hildesheimer Allgemeine Zeitung (1705).

It was also described by others as "the world's oldest national newspaper" and as "one of the world's oldest newspapers". The title of world's oldest newspaper still in print is also attributed to Gazzetta di Mantova, The London Gazette (1665), the weekly Berrow's Worcester Journal (1690), and Haarlems Dagblad (1883), through its forcible merger with the Weeckelycke Courante van Europa (1656).

== See also ==
- List of newspapers in Austria

== Bibliography ==
- 250 Jahre Wiener Zeitung: Eine Festschrift [250 Years of Wiener Zeitung: A Festschrift] (PDF) (in German). Weiner Zeitung. 1953. Archived from the original (PDF) on 25 July 2021.
- Havinga, Anna (2018). Invisibilising Austrian German: on the effect of linguistic prescriptions and educational reforms on writing practices in 18th-century Austria. Lingua historica Germanica. Berlin Boston: Walter de Gruyter GmbH. ISBN 978-3-11-054629-3.
- Mayer, Anton (1883). Wiens Buchdrucker-Geschichte, 1482–1882 [Vienna's book printer history, 1482-1882]. Vol. 2. Verlag des Comités zur feier der vierhundertj. einführung der buchdruckerkunst in Wien, in commission bei W. Frick Druck von F. Jasper.
