= Menorah (magazine) =

Austrian Jewish magazine (1923–1932)

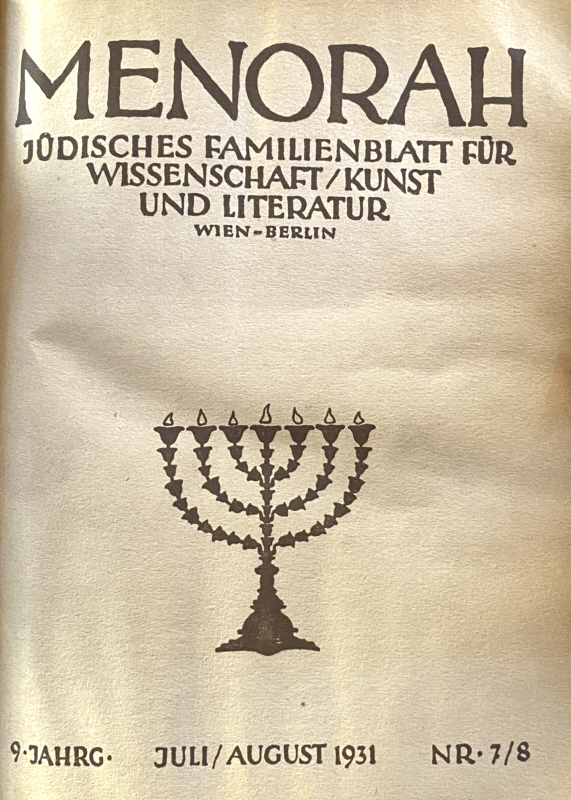
- July/August 1931 Menorah
- Editor: Norbert Hoffmann
- Categories: Family magazine
- Frequency: Monthly; Irregular
- Publisher: Habrith Verlag
- Founded: 1923
- First issue: 1 July 1923
- Final issue: October 1932
- Country: Austria
- Based in: Vienna
- Language: German

Menorah was a monthly Jewish illustrated magazine which appeared in Vienna, Austria, between 1923 and 1932. It was published in German. The subtitle of the magazine was jüdisches Familienblatt für Wissenschaft, Kunst und Literatur (German: Jewish family paper for science, art and literature).

== History and profile ==
Menorah was established in 1923, and its first issue appeared on 1 July that year. The publisher of the magazine was Habrith Verlag based in Vienna from 1925. It was started as a monthly magazine, but later its frequency became irregular. Norbert Hoffmann was the editor and Friedrich Matzner was the editorial director of the magazine. Josefine Hoffmann was another editor of Menorah.

Menorah adopted a liberal-conservative political stance and aimed to connect various groups of Judaism and to bring about an integration among these groups based on a cultural basis. Its target audience was educated Jewish middle class. Menorah featured stories, fairy tales, novel extracts and poems. The magazine's illustrated content was expanded from 1925. Nachum ‘Tim’ Gidal published a photo essay entitled Palästina, das Land der Gegensätze (German: Palestine, the Land of Contrasts) in the September 1931 issue of the magazine. The essay included thirteen images. It also covered articles on fashion and modern styles which were consistent with Jewish values.

Menorah folded in October 1932. The issues of the magazine were archived by Goethe University Frankfurt.

Isabella Gartner published a book on Menorah in 2009.
