= Täglich Alles =

Daily newspaper published in Vienna, Austria (1992–2000)

- Type: Daily newspaper
- Founder: Kurt Falk
- Editor-in-chief: Oswald Hicker
- Founded: 5 April 1992
- Ceased publication: August 2000
- Political alignment: Populism; Euroscepticism
- Language: German
- Headquarters: Vienna
- Country: Austria

Täglich Alles (German: Daily Everything) was a German-language daily tabloid newspaper published in Vienna, Austria, between 1992 and 2000.

== History and profile ==
Täglich Alles was first published on 5 April 1992. The founder of the paper was Kurt Falk who also founded the weekly entertainment magazine Die Ganze Woche. Oswald Hicker served as the editor-in-chief of the daily, which had its headquarters in Vienna.

Täglich Alles was a tabloid paper which was described by Mari Pascua as a daily magazine. It mostly covered short and less detailed news stories and extensive photographs. The other characteristics of the paper were the use of big headlines, a colloquial language and the focus on sensational and gossip stories and scandals. On the other hand, it also expressed views about some significant political events and objected to the EU membership of Austria.

Täglich Alles had also a xenophobic discourse. In a 1992 study on political orientation of the Austrian newspaper readers it was found that 46% of its readers had a xenophobic attitude.

Due to its political stance, particularly its opposition to the European Union, and sensationalist journalism the paper significantly lost advertising revenues. Täglich Alles ceased publication in August 2000.

== Circulation and readership ==
Täglich Alles had a circulation of 500,000 copies in 1993, making it the second best-selling paper in the country. In the period of 1995–1996 the paper had a circulation of 544,000 copies, making it the second best-selling paper after Neue Kronenzeitung. Both papers reached more than 60% of the Austrian readers in 1996.

In 1997 Täglich Alles was one of four most read newspapers in Austria. In 1998 the paper sold nearly 390,000 daily copies.
