= Vorarlberger Nachrichten =

Austrian daily newspaper

- Type: Daily newspaper
- Owner: Vorarlberg Media
- Publisher: Russmedia Verlag
- Founded: 16 November 1945; 80 years ago
- Language: German
- Headquarters: Bregenz
- Country: Austria
- Sister newspapers: NEUE
- Website: www.vol.at

Vorarlberger Nachrichten (Austrian German pronunciation: [foːɐ̯ˈarlbɛrɡɐ ˈnaːxrɪçtn̩]; simply VN) is a German language regional newspaper published in Bregenz, Vorarlberg, Austria. It is one of the leading regional publications in the country and has been in circulation since 1945.

== History and profile ==
VN was first published on 16 November 1945 during the occupation of Austria by the US and French forces following World War II. In time of its formation period it was under the influence of the French. The paper has its headquarters in Bregenz and serves for Vorarlberg. The Vorarlberg Media, which is also the owner of NEUE, owns the paper. It is published by the Russmedia Verlag which also publishes NEUE. Both companies are headed by Eugene A. Russ. Christian Ortner served as the editor-in-chief of VN.

In 1994 VN began to print in four colors, being the first traditional Austrian newspaper in this regard. The paper was named as the Newspaper of the Year by the World Newspaper Congress in 2006 for its quality journalism, innovation, the use of multimedia and economic management.

== Circulation ==
VN had a circulation of 72,000 copies in 2002, making it the tenth best-selling daily in Austria. The paper also sold 72,000 copies in 2004.

Its readership was 30% in 2006. For the first quarter of 2006 the paper had a circulation of 65,112 copies. In 2007 it sold 72,000 copies.

The circulation of VN was 63,625 copies from Mondays to Saturdays in October 2010. In 2011 its average circulation was 62,762 copies. The average circulation of the paper was 63,000 copies in 2013. In 2018 VN sold 56,914 copies.
