= Oberösterreichische Nachrichten =

German language regional newspaper published in Linz, Austria

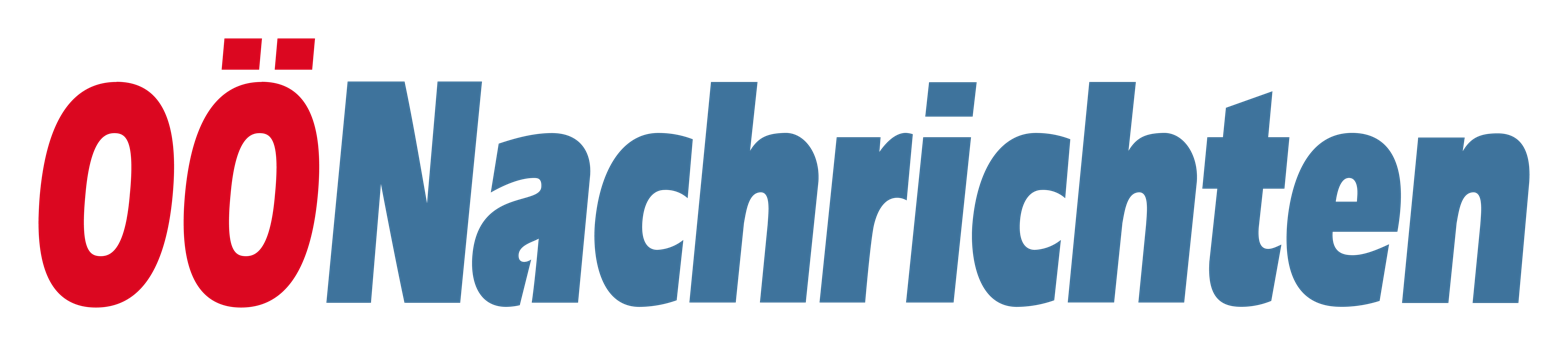
- Type: Daily newspaper, except Sunday
- Format: Broadsheet
- Publisher: Rudolf Andreas Cuturi
- Editor-in-chief: Susanne Dickstein
- Founded: 11 June 1945; 81 years ago
- Political alignment: Independent
- Language: German
- Headquarters: Linz
- Country: Austria
- Circulation: 116,527 (2023)
- Readership: 359,000 (2023)
- Website: www.nachrichten.at

The Oberösterreichische Nachrichten (OÖN) (German pronunciation: [ˈoːbɐˌʔøːstəʀaɪ̯çɪʃə ˈnaːχʀɪçtən]) is a German language regional newspaper published in Linz, Austria.

== History and profile ==
OÖN was established by the US forces occupying Austria after World War II. The first issue was published on 11 June 1945. The paper has its head office in Linz. The publisher of the paper is the Wimmer Medien. The daily is published in broadsheet format and has an independent political leaning.

== Circulation ==
OÖN was the fifth best selling Austrian newspaper in 2002 with a circulation of 132,000 copies. The paper had a circulation of 123,470 copies in 2003. It was the fourth best selling newspaper in Austria with a circulation of 129,000 copies in 2004.

The circulation of OÖN was 140,000 copies in 2007. It was the fifth best selling newspaper in the country in 2008 with a circulation of 140,196 copies. In 2009 the paper had a circulation of 137,947 copies. The average circulation of the paper was 134,493 copies in 2010. The paper had an average circulation of 127,000 copies in 2013. It sold 127,139 copies in 2018.
