= Die Presse =

Austrian daily broadsheet

- Front page on 30 September 2010. The headline reads "EU goes soft on Sarkozy" and refers to the French president's deportation of Roma migrants from France.
- Type: Daily newspaper
- Format: Broadsheet
- Owner: Styria Media Group AG
- Publisher: Die Presse Verlags-Gesellschaft m.b.H. & Co KG
- Editor: Florian Asamer
- Founded: 1848; 178 years ago (Note: Established as Die Presse in 1848, the staff split in 1864 to form the Neue Freie Presse, aryanized by the Nazis in 1938 and effectively closed in 1939, reestablished as Die Presse in 1946, after the Second World War."Die Presse - Die Geschichte". Archived from the original on 6 February 2014.)
- Political alignment: Classical liberalism Christian democracy Conservatism
- Language: German
- Headquarters: Vienna
- Country: Austria
- Circulation: 80,000 (2013)
- ISSN: 2662-0308 (print); 1563-5449 (web)
- Website: diepresse.com

Die Presse (lit. 'The Press', German pronunciation: [diː ˈpʁɛsə]) is a German-language daily broadsheet newspaper based in Vienna, Austria. It is considered a newspaper of record for Austria.

== History and profile ==
Die Presse was first printed on 3 July 1848 as a liberal (libertarian)-bourgeois newspaper within the meaning of the revolutions of 1848 by the entrepreneur August Zang. Its staff split in 1864 under the leadership of Max Friedländer, Michael Etienne and Adolf Werthner to form the Neue Freie Presse, which later was aryanized by the Nazis in 1938 and effectively closed in 1939. In 1946, after the Second World War, resistance fighter Ernst Molden, who had been vice-editor-in-chief of the Neue Freie Presse from 1921 until 1939, reestablished the newspaper as Die Presse.

The "Presse" had been struggling for financial survival for a long time, until during the 1960s, the Austrian Chamber of Commerce became the main shareholder. Since 1999 it has been owned by the Styria Medien AG, a conservative-liberal media group founded by the Catholic Church. Its publisher is Die Presse Verlag GmbH.

The paper covers general news topics. It is frequently quoted in international media concerning news from Austria. Since March 2009 it has also been operating a weekly newspaper under the name "Die Presse am Sonntag". The daily covers half-page science news each day.

The political position of the Die Presse can be described as classical liberal, with a strong emphasis on free-market economy and small government, traditionally opposing Austria's grand coalition and its neocorporatist tendencies. It therefore stands in contrast to other Austrian newspapers of quality, including the more conservative Wiener Zeitung and the social-liberal Der Standard. Emphasis is placed on the 1848 revolutions as the beginning of its tradition as a liberal newspaper, citing them in its slogan, "Free since 1848". Despite its liberal free-market orientation, Karl Marx and Friedrich Engels wrote a series of articles on the American Civil War for Die Presse in the early 1860s, which were later collected into the book The Civil War in the United States.

In 2007, the editor-in-chief of Die Presse was Michael Fleischhacker, who had been appointed to the post in 2004. Next year, the paper was named Best Editorial Team in Austria.

== Circulation ==
In 2002 Die Presse was one of four quality daily newspapers with nationwide distribution along with Der Standard, Salzburger Nachrichten, and Wiener Zeitung.

Year	Circulation
2002	120,000
2004	115,000
2007	121,000
2008	120,363
2009	102,598
2010	97,091
2011	74,032
2013	80,000

== CIA involvement ==
In 2009, reports claimed that the long-time editor Otto Schulmeister had been working for the CIA in the 1960s and the 1970s, and the CIA already described it internally as "CIA-subsidized" as early as 1951, when the CIA used it to distribute Animal Farm in the Soviet Zone of Vienna.
