= Congregation B'nai Israel Synagogue =

Synagogue in Fleischmanns, New York, US

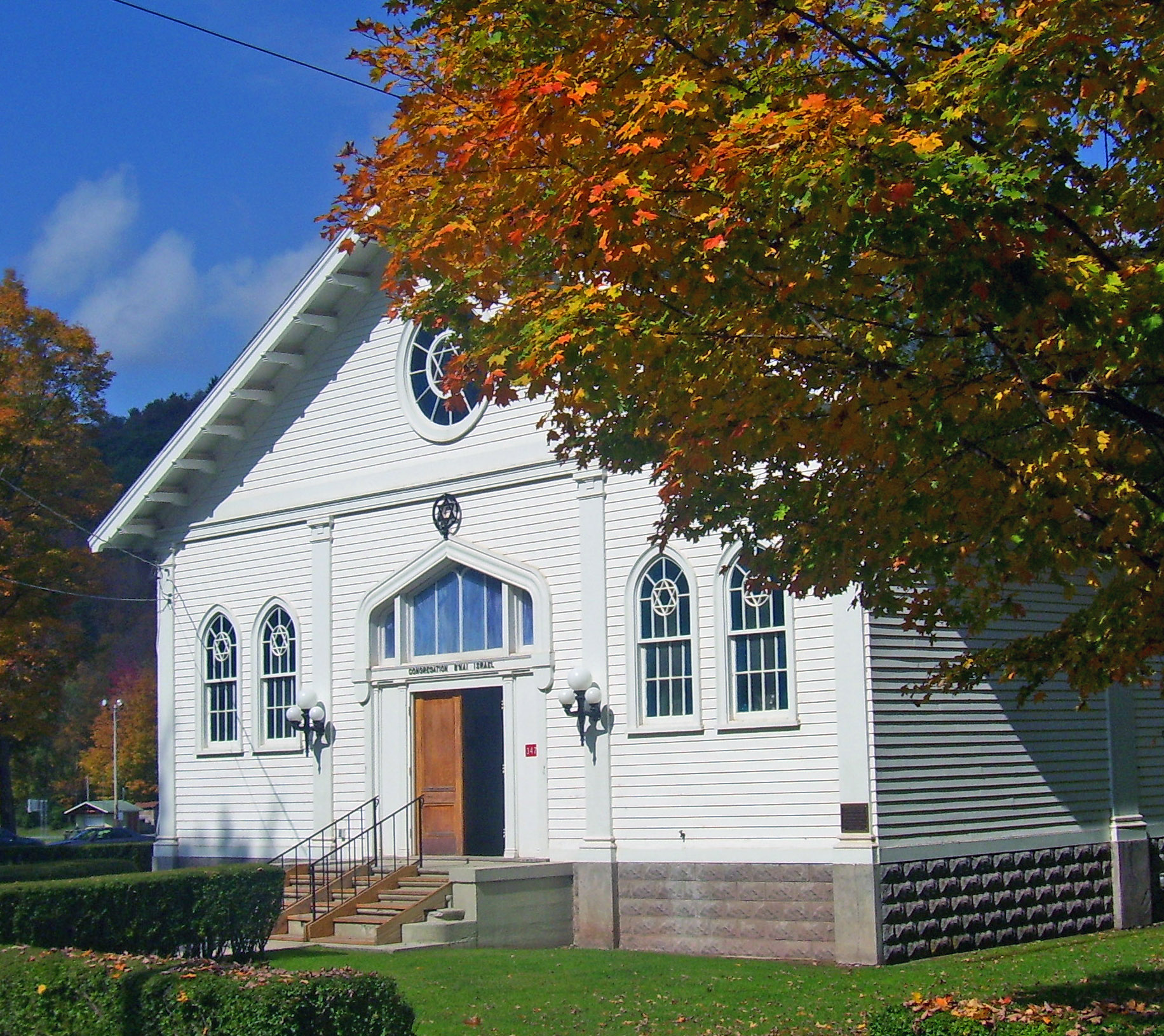
- South elevation and partial west profile, 2008

- Location in New York

Religion
- Affiliation: Conservative Judaism
- Ecclesiastical or organizational status: Synagogue
- Status: Active

Location
- Location: Wagner Avenue, Fleischmanns, New York
- Country: United States
- Interactive map of Congregation B'nai Israel Synagogue
- Coordinates: 42°9′19″N 74°31′59″W

Architecture
- Style: Neo-Classical
- General contractor: Crosby and Kelly
- Established: 1918 (as a congregation)
- Groundbreaking: 1920
- Completed: c. 1920

Specifications
- Direction of façade: South
- Materials: Wood, stone

Website
- bnai-israel-fleischmanns-ny.org
- Congregation B'nai Israel Synagogue
- U.S. National Register of Historic Places
- NRHP reference No.: 02001396
- Added to NRHP: November 21, 2002

Congregation Bnai Israel Synagogue is a Conservative synagogue located on Wagner Avenue in Fleischmanns, New York, in the United States.

The wooden building dates from the 1920s, built two years after local farmers founded the congregation. Originally an Orthodox synagogue, it has since become Conservative. It is the only synagogue in the Catskills with an exposed truss roof. In 2002, the synagogue was added to the National Register of Historic Places, after a multi-year effort by Bernard Rosenberg, the descendant of a founding member. Congregation Bnai Israel Synagogue is the only synagogue in Delaware County to be listed.

== Overview ==
Nearly all the original synagogues of the Catskill Congregations were, in fact, renovated 19th Century local District Schools. The still extant examples stand in the exact locations of former district schools as plotted on the New York State Topographical Maps of the Mid to late 19th Century, commonly called Beers Atlas Maps. The buildings all have the unmistakable gable facing façade of the New York District Schools of the Hudson Valley. The Greek Revival style of the early 19th Century with its signature Eave Return was reminiscent of Dutch gable fronted architecture. The design was widely used in New York for Dutch Reformed Churches, Town Halls and District Schools (one room school houses.) Later buildings used the similar Neo-Classical architecture of the Fleischmanns synagogue. In the 1920s the style was archaic as shown by the many examples of updating to the then popular Mission style. The proof is in the many examples of the eave-less hidden roof Mission style with Roof Eave Return that exists solely on the synagogues of the Catskill Mountains of the 1920s.

== Building ==
The synagogue occupies a 120-by-192-foot (37 by 59 m) lot on the north side of Wagner Avenue, a side street that runs along the south side of the village, between Ellsworth Avenue and Park Road, southwest of downtown Fleischmanns. The neighborhood is largely residential, with many old boardinghouses from the late 19th and early 20th centuries. Behind the houses across the street the ground slopes up to the NY 28 state highway, rerouted there from the center of the village. To the west is the park created by Julius Fleischmann, son of Charles, after whom the village, originally called Griffin Corner, were renamed. Behind the synagogue, to its north, a small grove of trees surrounds the rear of the building, buffering it from the Bush Kill. As a consequence of being on the creek's flood plain, the synagogue's lot is flat and grassy, set off by ornamental hedges.

=== Exterior ===
The building itself is a one-and-a-half-story three-by-five-bay frame structure on a concrete block foundation. It is sided in clapboard and topped by a gabled roof with overhanging eaves supported by brackets. Along the south (front) and side elevations the bays are divided by flat pilasters with Doric capitals supporting an architrave with wide frieze.

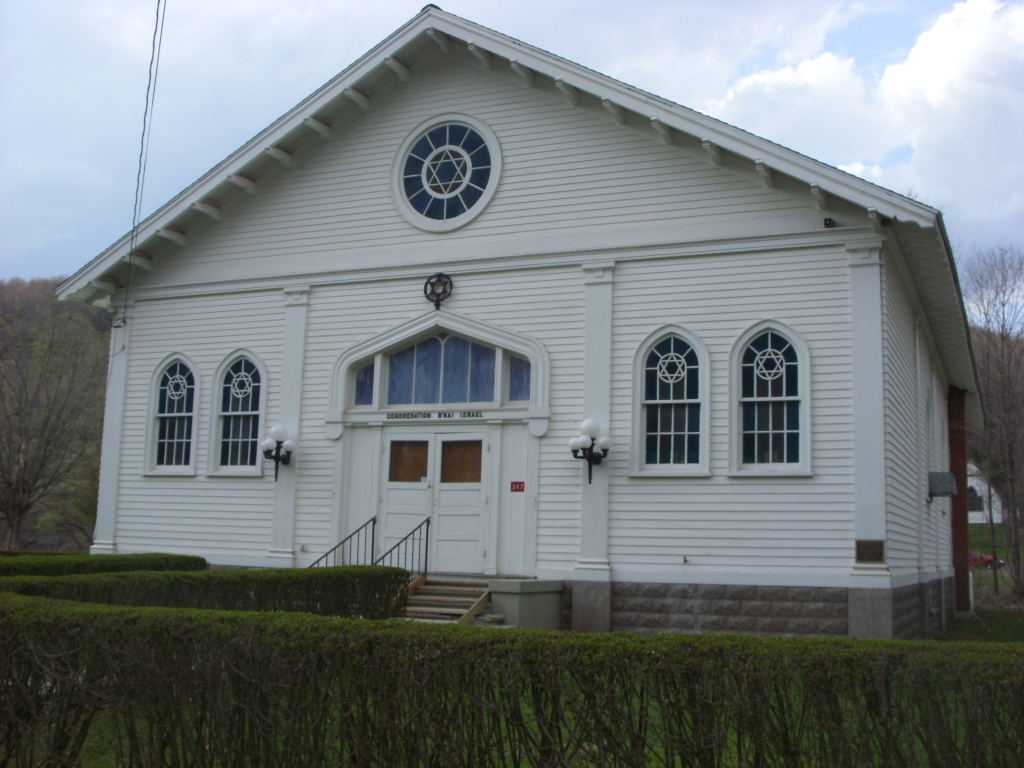
South (front) façade, 2009

On the south façade the windows are in deep molded lancet arch frames. Below the sashes the eight panes are filled with colored glass; above them they have a Star of David design filled with yellow glass surrounded by blue. Larger versions of this design are in the circular windows at each gable end.

=== Interior ===
A set of concrete steps leads up to the main entrance, double wooden doors surrounded by an enframement in which pilasters on the side support a large pointed arch with iridescent glass panels. Inside, a narrow vestibule, with a kitchen on the side, leads to another set of double doors which open onto the community room. It has a pass-through window to the kitchen on a rear wall that replicates the sanctuary's original rear wall.

Another set of double doors leads into the sanctuary, which occupies the rear third of the building. The tripartite ark is on the north wall, on a balustraded platform with round-arched carved wooden doors. On either side are projecting sections with panels. Corinthian columns support an entablature with a wide frieze and projecting cornice with modillions that extends across the center. Atop either side projection is a carved lion. The center section holds the Torah behind sliding wooden doors. It is topped with a round-arched panel with key molding depicting two wooden tablets carved with the Ten Commandments.

The bimah is in front of the ark. It has four heavy posts, two with finial carvings on top and wide wooden moldings on its exterior walls. Pews with foliate moldings on their scrolled, curved handrails, surround it on three sides.

The walls and ceiling are finished in wallboard with applied battens. A narrow strip old wooden molding makes a course around the interior at windowsill level. The ceiling has exposed wooden trusses. Above the vestibule, community room, and kitchen is a space that could have been a gallery, with a railing, yet is unfinished and too small to be used as such. It may have been purely decorative.

== History ==
Jews began settling in the Catskills around the end of the 19th century. Many came to farm but soon found that the hotel business was as lucrative, if not more, with many of their urban co-religionists wanting a mountain vacation at resorts that welcomed them and accommodated their dietary obligations. In 1918, six of these farmers in the Fleischmanns area who had been meeting in each other's homes for informal religious study formally incorporated as Congregation Bnai Israel.

A month afterwards, they bought the land for the synagogue they hoped to build for $1. The following year they held a ball to raise more money. A thousand guests attended; it would be remembered for long afterwards as one of the best such events in the region. It raised about $3,500 ($65,000 in contemporary dollars) from affluent Jews in the area and construction was able to begin in 1920.

Local builders Crosby and Kelly, who had also built the village's Skene Memorial Library two decades earlier, did the construction. It reflects a number of influences common to Catskill synagogues. Its overall plan and sanctuary layout, and the Stars of David in the windows, are in keeping with the Orthodox traditions of the founders. The gable roofs and combination of Gothic and classical detailing are features borrowed from the Protestant churches abundant in the region. B'nai Israel is unique in the Catskills in having an exposed truss ceiling, a feature suggesting Episcopalian influences.

After 20 years, the sanctuary was partitioned to create the current community room, kitchen and vestibule. Finishings from the original rear wall were saved and reinstalled on the new rear wall of the community room. There have been no other significant modifications to the building.

== See also ==
- National Register of Historic Places listings in Delaware County, New York
