= Baker =

Person who bakes and optionally sells bread products

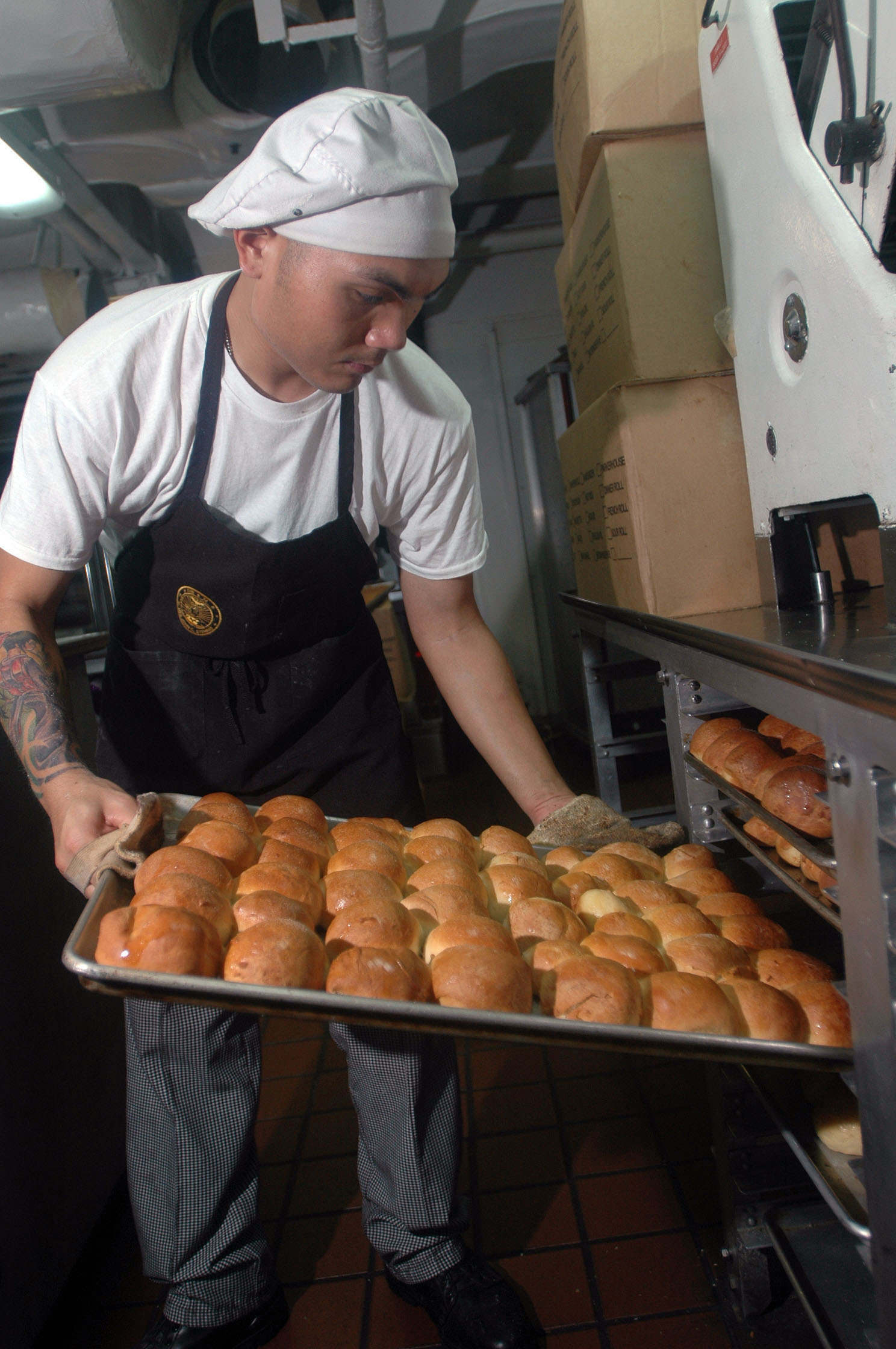
- A U.S. Navy baker aboard the USS John C. Stennis aircraft carrier moves a tray of hot, freshly baked rolls onto a cooling rack.

Occupation
- Occupation type: Vocation
- Activity sectors: Food; Hospitality

Description
- Education required: Apprenticeship
- Fields of employment: Food; Hospitality
- Related jobs: Chef

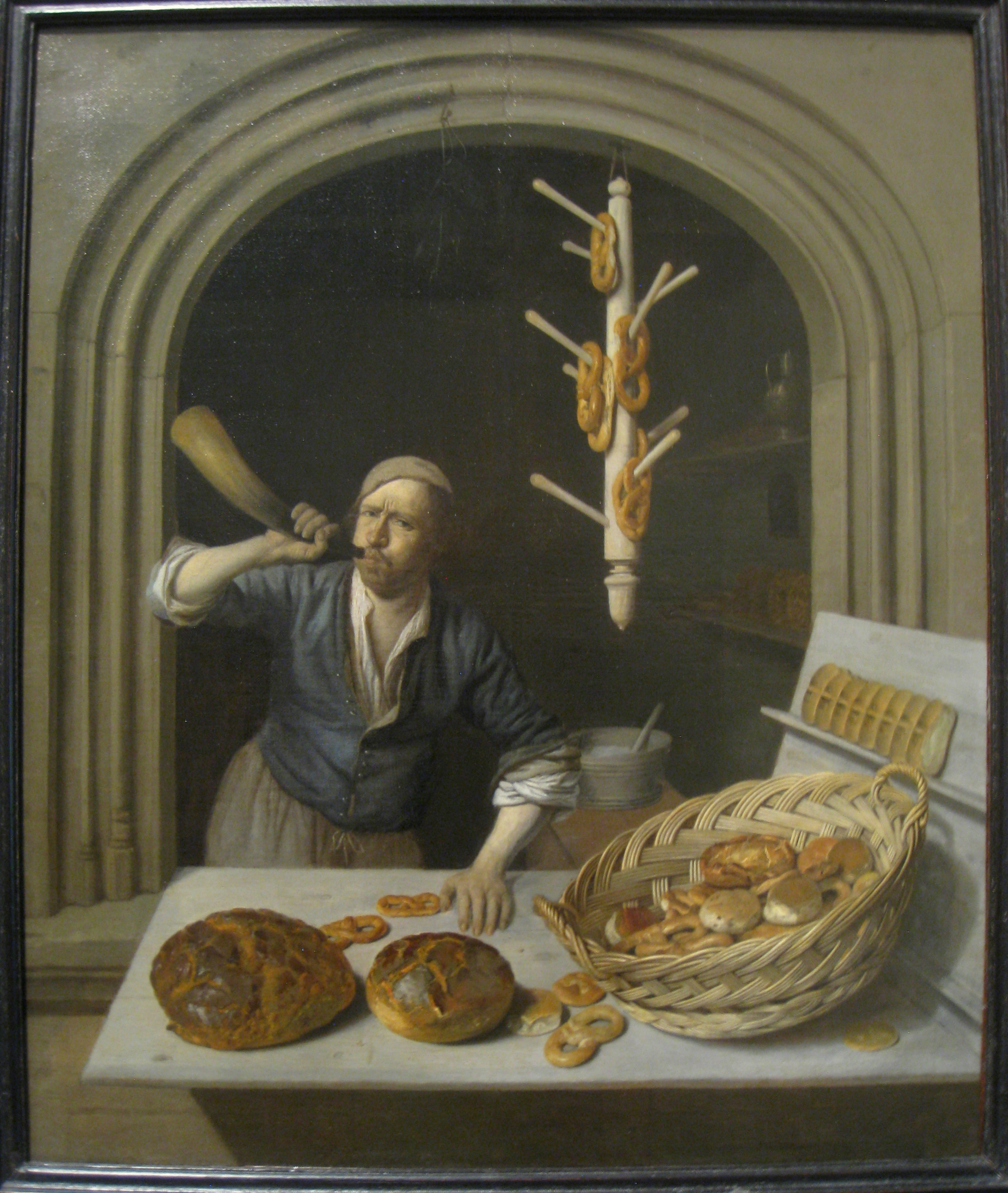
The Baker (c. 1681); oil-on-canvas painting by Job Adriaensz Berckheyde (1630–1693) now held by the Worcester Art Museum.

A baker is a tradesperson who bakes and sometimes sells breads and other products made of flour by using an oven or other concentrated heat source. The place where a baker works is called a bakery.

== History ==
=== Ancient history ===
Since grains have been a staple food for millennia, the activity of baking is a very old one. Control of yeast, however, is relatively recent. By the fifth and sixth centuries BCE, the ancient Greeks used enclosed ovens heated by wood fires; communities usually baked bread in a large communal oven. Greeks baked dozens and possibly hundreds of types of bread; Athenaeus described seventy-two varieties.

In ancient Rome several centuries later, the first mass production of breads occurred, and "the baking profession can be said to have started at that time." Ancient Roman bakers used honey and oil in their products, creating pastries rather than breads. In ancient Rome, bakers (Latin, pistor) were sometimes slaves, who were (like other slave-artisans) sometimes manumitted. Large households in Rome normally had their own bakers. During those times, most of the people used to bake their own bread but bakeries (pistrina) were popular all over the towns.

The Gauls are credited with discovering that the addition of beer froth to bread dough made well-leavened bread, marking the use of controlled yeast for bread dough.

=== Medieval Europe ===
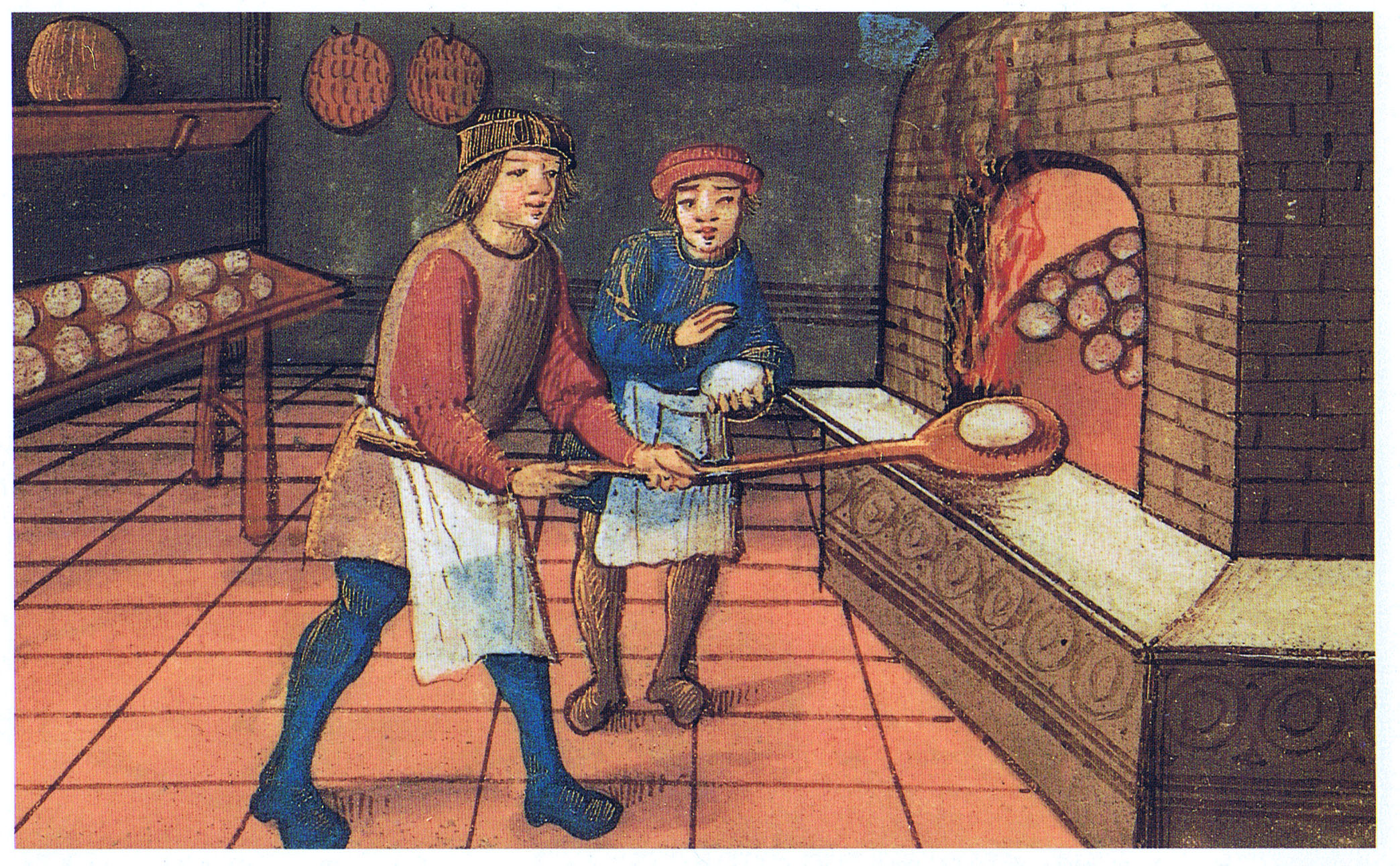
A medieval baker and his apprentice

In Medieval Europe, baking ovens were often separated from other buildings (and sometimes located outside city walls) to mitigate the risk of fire. Because bread was an important staple food, bakers' production factors (such as bolting yields, ingredients, and loaf sizes) were heavily regulated. For example, Henry III of England promulgated the Assize of Bread and Ale in 1267, subjecting all commercial bakers and brewers to various fees to practice their trade and imposing various regulations, such as inspection and verification of weights and measures, quality control, and price controls. Soon after the enactment of the Assize, "baking became a very stable industry, and was executed much more professionally than brewing, resulting in towns and villages having fewer bakers than brewers." Because ovens were expensive capital investments and required careful operation, specialized bakeries opened.

Bakers were often part of the craft guild system, which was well-established by the sixteenth century: master bakers instructed apprentices and were assisted by journeymen. In Amsterdam in 1694, for example, the cake-bakers, pie-bakers, and rusk-bakers separated from an earlier Bread Bakers Guild and formed their own guild, regulating the trade. A fraternity of bakers in London existed as early as 1155, according to records of payments to the Exchequer; the Worshipful Company of Bakers was formed by charters dated 1486, 1569, and 1685. The guild still exists today, with mostly ceremonial and charitable functions. Five bakers have served as lord mayor of London.

A group of bakers is called a "tabernacle".

=== Ming dynasty China ===
In Ming dynasty China, bakers were divided into different social statuses according to their customers. Bakers were among the thousands of servants who served in the Ming Palace, including recruited cooks, imperial eunuchs, and trained serving-women (Shangshiju). Bakers often joined the occupation through apprenticeship, or by being born into a family of bakers.

In addition to the secular aspect of baking, Ming bakers also were responsible for providing pastries for use in various rituals, festivals and ceremonies, such as zongzi. In "Shi Fu Meets a Friend at Tanque" buns were provided for the construction ceremony.

Within bakeries, traditional patriarchal hierarchy controlled. For the family-owned bakery, the eldest male figure (usually the father) in the highest position of the hierarchy. For example, in Feng Menglong's story, when Mr. Bo went out looking for the family's lost silver, his wife was ordered to take care of the bakery.

Ming fiction and art records examples of various bakers; for example, in Feng Menglong's story, the Bo couple owns a bakery to sell the cakes and snacks while in Water Margin, the character Wu Dalang does not have a settled store and sells pancakes on the shoulder pole along the street The Ming-era painter Qiu Ying's work Along the River During the Qingming Festival shows food stores alongside the street and peddlers who are selling food along the streets.

The Ming work Ming Dai Tong Su Ri Yong Lei Shu, which records techniques and items needed in Ming daily life, devotes a full chapter to culinary skills, including the preparation of pancakes and other types of cakes.

The work The Plum in the Golden Vase mentions baozi (steam bun).

=== Columbian Exchange ===
The Columbian Exchange, which began in 1492, had a profound influence on the baking occupation. Access to sugar greatly increased as a result of new cultivation in the Caribbean, and ingredients such as cocoa and chocolate became available in the Old World. In the eighteenth century, processors learned how to refine sugar from sugar beets, allowing Europeans to grow sugar locally. These developments led to an increase in the sophistication of baking and pastries, and the development of new products such as puff pastries and Danish dough.

=== 18th century to present ===
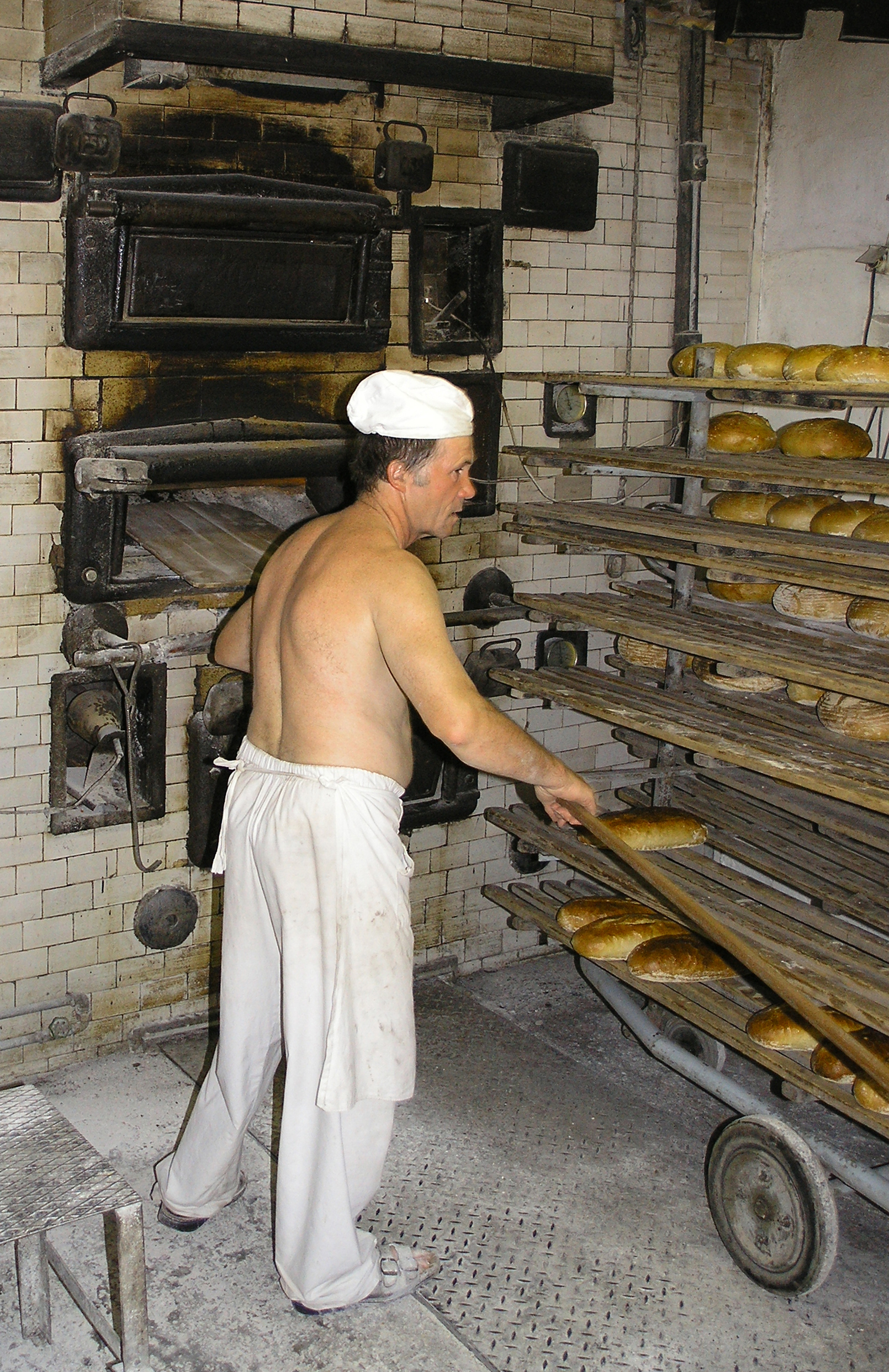
A traditional baker in Poland removes fresh bread from an oven with a long wooden peel and places it on a cooling rack.

Two important books on bread-baking were published in the 1770s: Paul-Jacques Malaouin published L'art du meinier, du boulanger et du vermicellier (The Art of the Miller, the Bread-Baker, and the Pasta-Maker) in 1775, and Antoine-Augustin Parmentier published Le parfair boulanger (The Perfect Bread-Baker) in 1778.

A study of the English city of Manchester from 1824–85, during the Industrial Revolution, determined that "baker and shopkeeper" was the third-most common occupation, with 178 male bakers, 19 female bakers, and 8 bakers of unknown sex in the city at that time. This occupation was less common than cloth manufacturer and tavern/public house worker, but more common than cotton spinner, merchant, calico printer, or grocer.

In 1895, the New York State Assembly passed a reformist "bakeshop law" which included protections for bakery workers; the law "banned employees from sleeping in the bakeries; specified the drainage, plumbing and maintenance necessary to keep the bakeries sanitary (cats were specifically allowed to stay on the premise—presumably to deal with the rats); limited the daily and weekly maximum of hours worked; and established an inspectorate to make sure these conditions were met." The legislation was soon replicated in other states. Joseph Lochner, a bakery owner in Utica, New York, was subsequently convicted of violating the law for forcing his employees to work more than sixty hours a week. He appealed his case to the U.S. Supreme Court, which decided, in the highly influential case of Lochner v. New York (1905), over a dissent from Justice Oliver Wendell Holmes, that the labor law violated a constitutional right to "freedom of contract". This case marked the beginning of a "pro-employer, laissez-faire" era, later known as the Lochner era, which "would cast a long shadow over American law, society, and politics" until the late 1930s, when Lochner was repudiated. Frustrated with the rapid deterioration of working conditions, bakery workers in New York went on strike in August 1905.

== In religion ==
=== Christianity ===
The first bakeries emerged in Jerusalem, after contact with the Egyptians, from whom the Hebrews learned better manufacturing techniques and obtained the recipe. A short time later, there was already a famous bakers' street in the city.

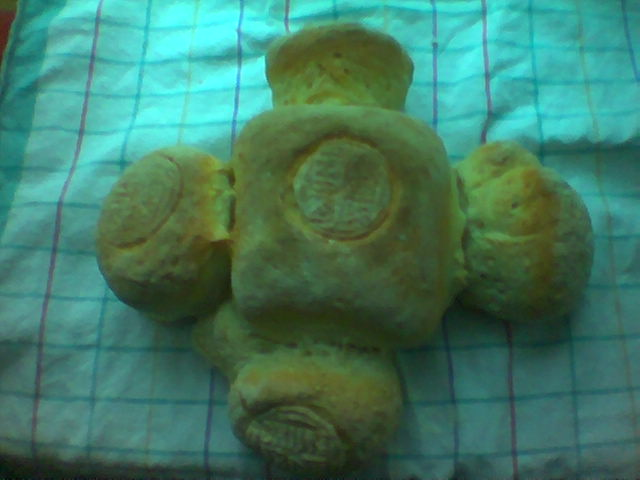
Bread of Eucharist in the Churches of the East (Prosphorus). Unlike Catholic hosts, this is leavened bread.

The prophet Elisha, then Jesus, performed the miracle of the multiplication of the loaves.

The bread is at the center of the Christian Eucharist; it is "sacramental bread", "singing bread", or "angel's bread". Jesus defines himself as "the bread of life" (John 6:35). Divine "grace" is called "the bread of the strong" and preaching, religious teaching, "the bread of the word of God". In Hebrew, Bethlehem means "house of bread", and Jesus was born in a city called Bread.

=== Roman Catholic patron saints ===
In Roman Catholic tradition, the patron saint of bakers and pastry chefs is Honoratus of Amiens (Honoré), a sixth-century bishop of Amiens in northern France for whom the St. Honoré cake is named. Lazarus of Bethany (Lazare) was originally a competitor to Honoré for the title of patron saint of bakers, but in the 17th century the French bakers' guild settled in favor of Honoré.

== As a surname ==
Baker is an easily recognizable English surname of medieval occupational origin; Baxster is the female form. Equivalent family names of occupational origin meaning "baker" exist in other languages: Boulanger, Bulinger, Dufour, and Fournier in French, Bäcker or Becker in German, and Piekarz in Polish.

== Duties and occupational hazards ==
According to the Occupational Outlook Handbook (OOH) published by the Bureau of Labor Statistics of the United States Department of Labor,

Bakers typically do the following:

- Check the quality of baking ingredients
- Prepare equipment for baking
- Measure and weigh flour and other ingredients
- Combine measured ingredients in mixers or blenders
- Knead, roll, cut, and shape dough
- Place dough into pans, into molds, or onto baking sheets
- Set oven temperatures
- Place items into ovens or onto grills
- Observe color and state of products being baked
- Apply glazes, icings, or other toppings

Bakers produce various types and quantities of breads, pastries, and other baked goods sold by grocers, wholesalers, restaurants, and institutional food services. Some bakers create new recipes.

Bakers encounter a number of occupational hazards. OOH reports that bakeries, "especially large manufacturing facilities, are filled with potential dangers such as hot ovens, mixing machines, and dough cutters. As a result, bakers have a higher rate of injuries and illnesses than the national average. Although their work is generally safe, bakers may endure back strains caused by lifting or moving heavy bags of flour or other products. Other common risks include cuts, scrapes, and burns. To reduce these risks, bakers often wear back supports, aprons, and gloves."

Baker's asthma—commonly caused by flour allergens and the microbial enzymes (often Aspergillus-derived) used to facilitate breadmaking—is one of the common causes of occupational asthma worldwide.

=== Comparison with pastry chef ===
Both bakers and pastry chefs make desserts and breads. In some restaurants and shops, a single individual serves in both roles. In other environments, there is a distinction between the two positions, with bakers making breads, rolls, and muffins, and pastry chefs making desserts, such as cakes, pies, tarts, and cookies. Even when both bakers and pastry chefs work in the same place, however, there may be overlap.

== Equipment ==
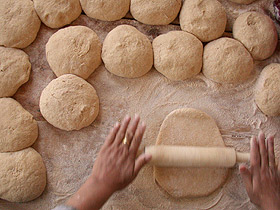
A rolling pin is used to work dough.

A variety of equipment is used by bakers, including:

- Baker's peel – A large, flat paddle, either wood or metal, used to slide loaves into and out of an oven
- Rolling pin – A tool used to roll and flatten dough
- Flour scoops – A tool used to add, remove, or measure flour
- Brushes – A tool used to brush off excess flour from dough, and for glazing
- Flour mills – A tool used to mill grains; may be either hand-cranked or mechanical

== Employment statistics ==
=== United States ===
According to the Occupational Outlook Handbook published by the Bureau of Labor Statistics of the United States Department of Labor, there were 185,300 bakers in the U.S. in 2014, with median pay of $23,600 per year or $11.35 per hour. About 28% of U.S. bakers work in stand-alone bakeries or in tortilla manufacturing; 26% work in grocery stores; 15% work in restaurants and other eating places; and 5% were self-employed. About 30% of U.S. bakers worked part-time in 2014.

== Gallery ==
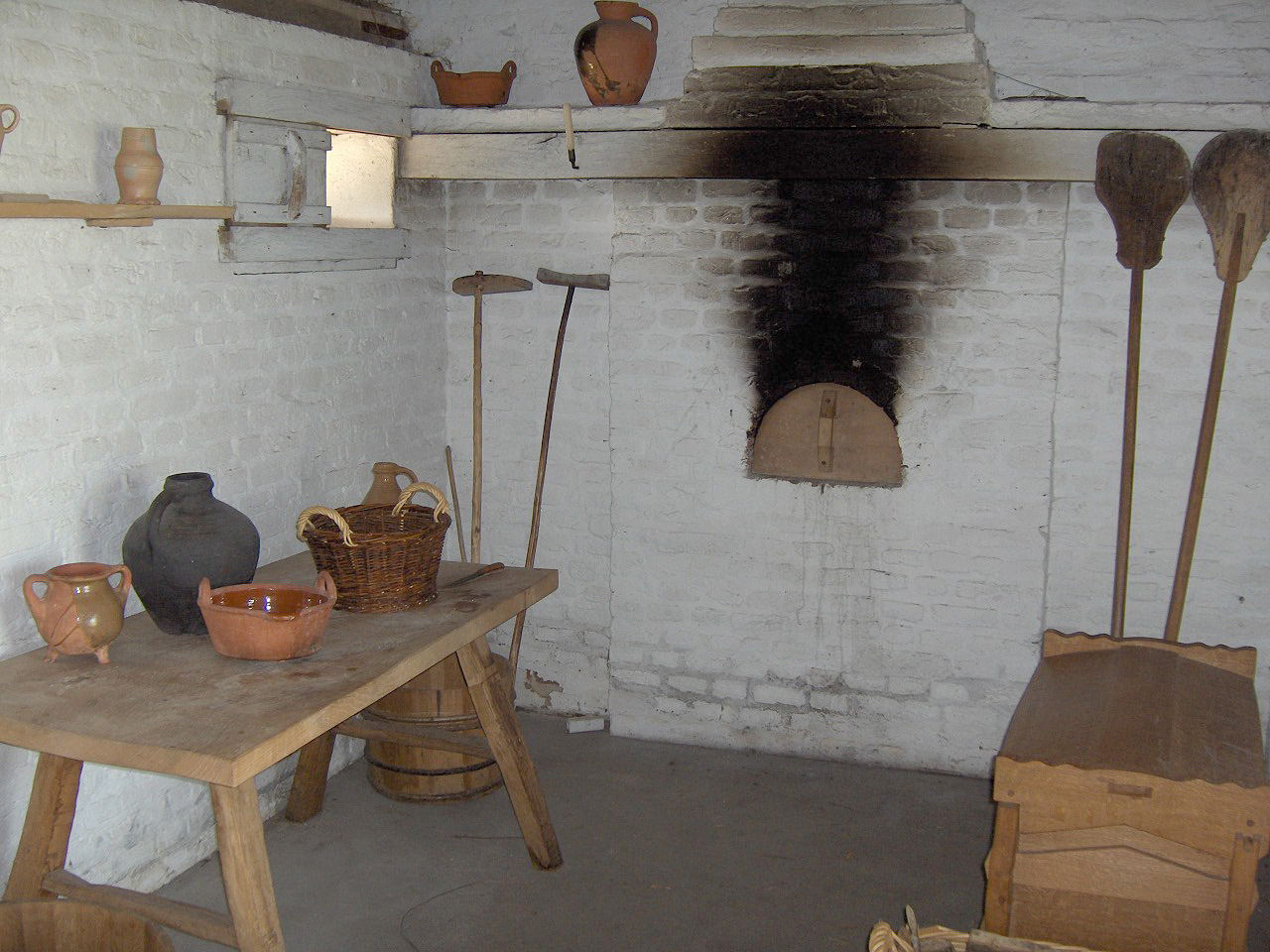
A bakery c. 1465; also used for baking hardtacks or sea biscuits

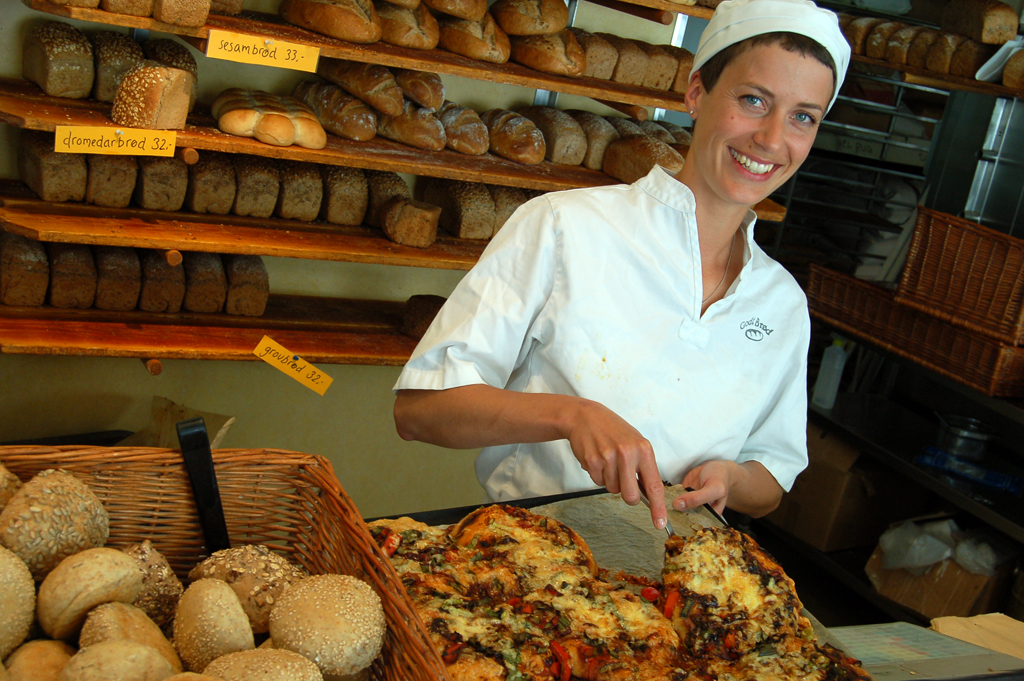
A baker's shop in Oslo, Norway

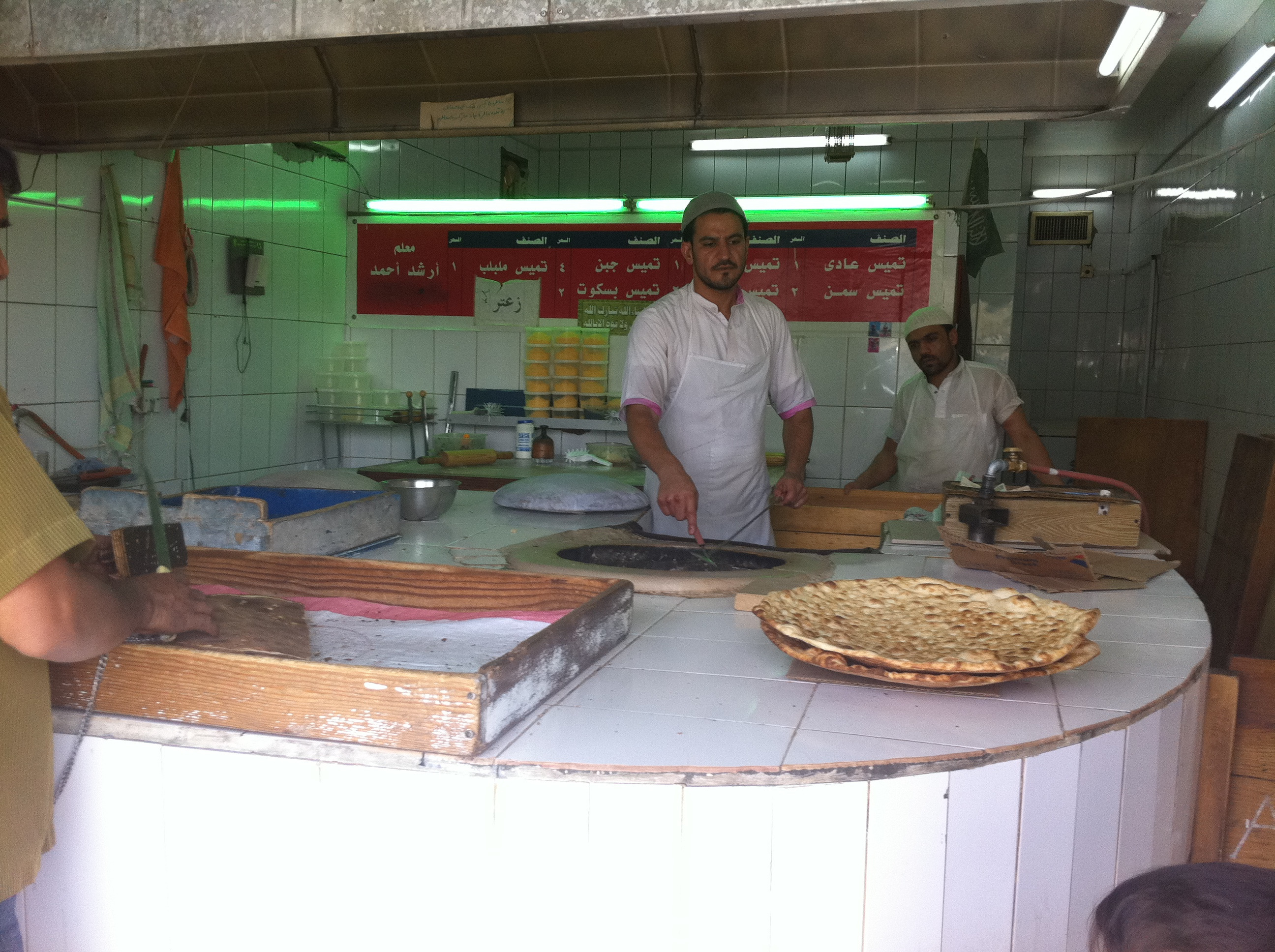
Bakery in Riyadh with traditional Afghan Bread (Tamees)

== See also ==
Media related to Baker at Wikimedia Commons

- Samuel Bath Thomas, a famous 19th century baker from Manhattan
- Bagel Bakers Local 338
- Bakehouse (building)
- Baker's percentage
- Baker's yeast, what bakers commonly use to make doughs rise
- Bakers, Food and Allied Workers' Union
- Bakery, Confectionery, Tobacco Workers and Grain Millers' International Union
- Bread machine, a home appliance to make single, basic loaves of bread
- Cake shop
- Chorleywood bread process, a process developed to make bread dough from the lower protein wheats of England
- Coffee cake, simple cakes made for everyday use such as for breakfast or as snacks
- List of baked goods
- List of bakers
- List of bakeries
- List of restaurant terminology
- Pastry chef, someone who specializes in the making and baking of pastries, desserts, and other elaborate sweets
- Pâtisserie, a bakery that specializes in pastries and sweets, in some countries this is a legal distinction
- Proofing (baking technique)
- Sliced bread, involves the industrial development of bread slicing machines
- Vienna bread, developed with processes that were early steps in the modernization of bread production
- White bread
- August Zang, Austrian soldier who started a bakery in Paris and introduced Viennese steam ovens and pastries there
