= Skene Memorial Library =

- U.S. National Register of Historic Places
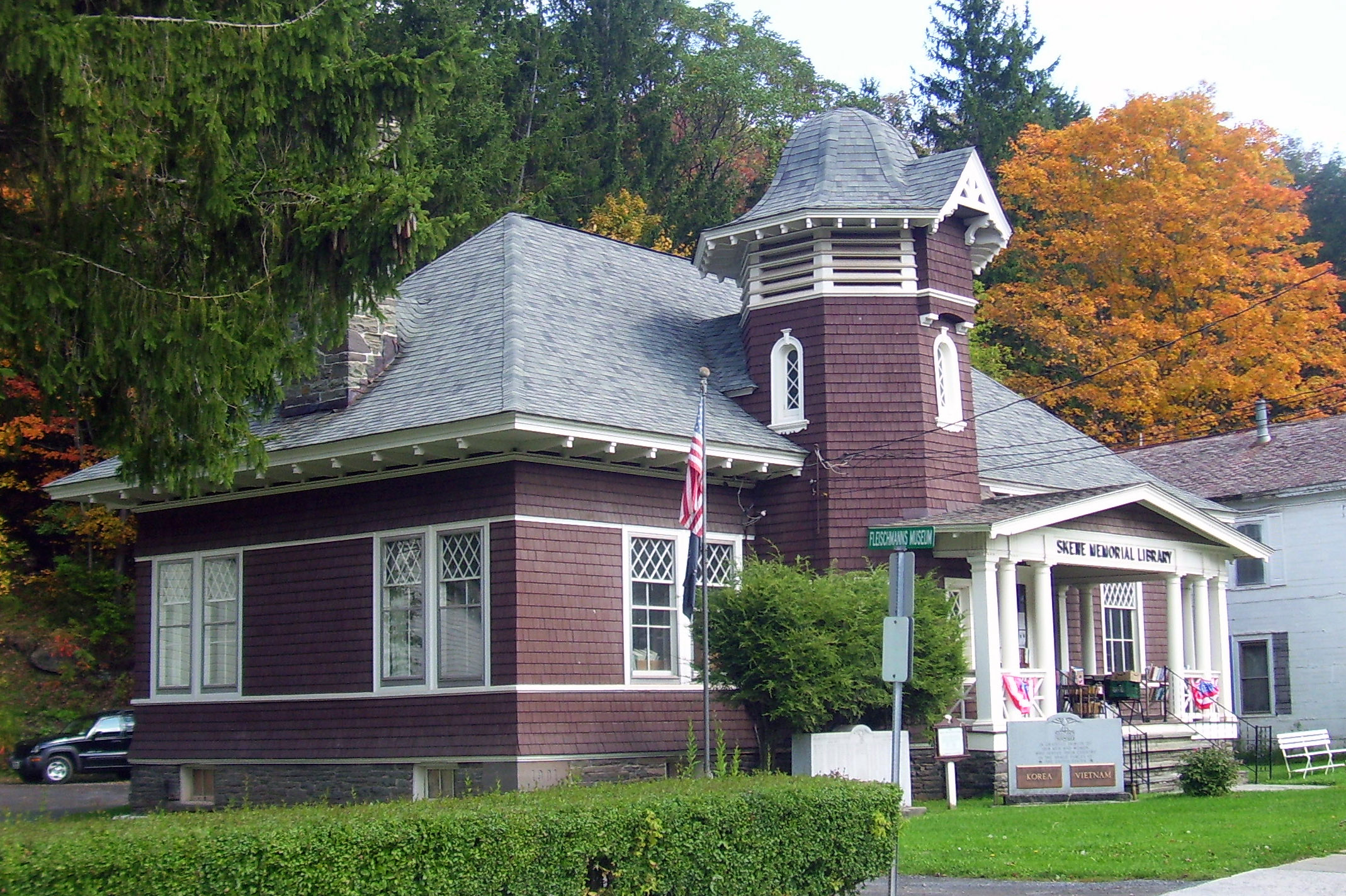
- South elevation and west profile, 2008

- Location within New York Location within the United States
- Location: Fleischmanns, New York
- Nearest city: Kingston
- Coordinates: 42°9′19″N 74°31′46″W
- Area: 0.9 acres (3,600 m^{2})
- Built: 1901
- Architect: H.G. and M.L. Emory; Kelly Crosby
- Architectural style: Queen Anne, Shingle Style
- NRHP reference No.: 01000576
- Added to NRHP: May 30, 2001

The Skene Memorial Library is located on Main Street in Fleischmanns, New York, United States. It is also used as the village hall. The frame building, combining elements of the Queen Anne and Shingle architectural styles, dates to the early 20th century. Its exterior incorporates aspects of local train station architecture.

It was built by the widow of prominent gynecologist Alexander Skene, who summered in the area, and had founded the library several years before. In addition to her own contributions and contributions from villagers, she raised money from Andrew Carnegie, making it one of the many Carnegie libraries. Later it was deeded to the village. In 2001 it was listed on the National Register of Historic Places. The library currently features a collection of books on the Catskills and Hudson River region among its 15,000 volumes.

== Building ==
The library is on an 0.9-acre (3,600 m^{2}) lot on the north side of Main Street in Fleischmanns' small downtown. The neighborhood is a mix of commercial and residential buildings. Behind the lot is woodlands, rising slightly to a low hill behind a small parking lot. In front is a small lawn with stone monuments to local war veterans, and the sidewalk.

=== Exterior ===
The building itself is an L-shaped one-story structure on a stone foundation sided in wood shingles. Four narrow wood moldings run around the eave, lintel, sill and water table levels. The high hipped roofs are shingled in asbestos with broad overhanging eaves supported by brackets. Stone chimneys rise from the west side and the east rear.

At the center of the south (front) facade is a porch supported by Doric columns and a wooden balustrade topped by a wide frieze and triglyph with dentilled moldings. The words "SKENE MEMORIAL LIBRARY" are on the entablature. Its overhang is also supported by narrow brackets. Three wide stone steps with iron railings climb up to it.

Above the porch is an octagonal tower with round-arched windows in alternating facets above the roofline. Its top stage has louvered vents in all but the front facet, which is sheltered by a gabled hood with a small vergeboard. It is topped by a rounded roof with the same bracketed eaves.

All windows are in pairs, with a diamond pattern in the upper pane. A similar pattern is in the transoms on the other two entrances, both on the north end of the rear. A modern wheelchair ramp goes up to these from the parking lot.

=== Interior ===
The double wood and glass doors at the main entrance lead into a small vestibule where stairs provide access to the tower and cellar. From there doors open into the main reading room, rectangular with an elliptical arched ceiling. The original plaster walls have been covered in modern paneling; the original hardwood floors remain. Oak and chestnut molding trims the cornice, doors and windows.

Two piers separate the main reading room from a smaller one on the west. It was meant to be separated from the main room by partititions that could be pulled down from the piers, but these may not be operational. The west reading room's main feature is the large stone fireplace on the west wall, with a decorative stone arch in splayed stone and brick. It has a narrow wooden mantel with a shelf supported by brackets and a 10-inch-wide (250 mm) wooden overmantel with decorative carving.

East of the main reading room is a stage area. It is recessed behind a partition and reached by three sets of stairs. Both it and the west reading room have molded window and door treatments similar to the main reading room. They can also be found in the small reading room in the north wing. The other room there, the village clerk's office, has been completely redone and has none of its original finishings.

== History ==
In the late 19th century, the economy of the Catskills had shifted from forest-product industries to resorts, with the establishment of the state Forest Preserve and the completion of the Ulster and Delaware Railroad. The Fleischmanns area became the summer residence of a number of celebrities of the era, such as baking magnate Charles Louis Fleischmann, for whom it would later be renamed, conductor Anton Seidl, opera singer Amelita Galli-Curci, and Alexander Skene.

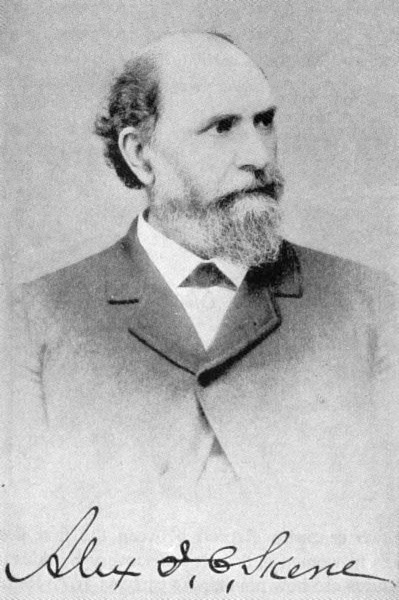
Alexander Skene

The latter, a Scottish emigrant, was a pioneering gynecologist who founded the American Gynecological Society and for whom Skene's gland is named. He and his wife, Belgian-born Annette Wilhelmine Lillian Van der Wegen, built Bonnie Em, a Scottish-style castle, as their summer home on the slopes of Belleayre Mountain in nearby Highmount.

In the 1890s, Annette Skene had been trying to get the community to organize a public library, offering to start it with a donation of 500 books from her own library. In 1896, after two years of her entreaties, a library association was formed. Two residents donated the present site in 1901. Initially, funding for a library building came from subscription fees paid by Fleischmanns residents. Mrs. Skene also wrote to Andrew Carnegie, who was offering to finance what came to be called Carnegie libraries in English-speaking countries at the time, in gratitude for the role libraries had played in his life. He contributed $5,000 ($194,000 in contemporary dollars) on the usual condition that the community building the library pledge a tenth of that amount annually for maintenance and support. Fleischmanns was able to raise double that amount, and began the collection with 875 books, including Mrs. Skene's original donation. The builder, Crosby Kelly, was another local resident and subscriber.

The library was opened late in 1901, named in memory of Alexander Skene, who had died the previous year. At that time, Carnegie funded libraries without any review of the plans for the proposed building, and New York architects Henry and Marshall Emery, summer residents who had also been among the subscribers, had a free hand. Most of their work is in the Rockland County village of Nyack, where Henry Emery moved the practice after his brother's death in 1921, and Albany and New York City.

The Skene library is not as high in style as the Emerys' other known work and seems to have been designed more to blend in with other local architecture. It combines the Queen Anne and Shingle styles, both popular for resorts and cottages in the 1890s. Features such as the overhanging roof, eaves and shingled siding also suggest the railroad stations in the area.

Marshall Emery and Annette Skene married, and continued to support the library for several years, donating a heater in 1905. The year before, the association's minutes reflect a donation of $130 from the local Ladies Aid Society to hold a fair, which continued for many years. Performances were given on the stage, many using a grand piano that has since been lost. One local resident recalls seeing her first film, a Tom Mix western, at the library.

In 1928 it was deeded to the village for use as a municipal building. It continues in both roles today. There have been no significant changes associated with this use other than the remodeling of one of the rear rooms to serve as the clerk's office.

== See also ==
- List of Carnegie libraries in New York
- National Register of Historic Places listings in Delaware County, New York
