= Julius Fleischmann =

American politician (1871–1925)

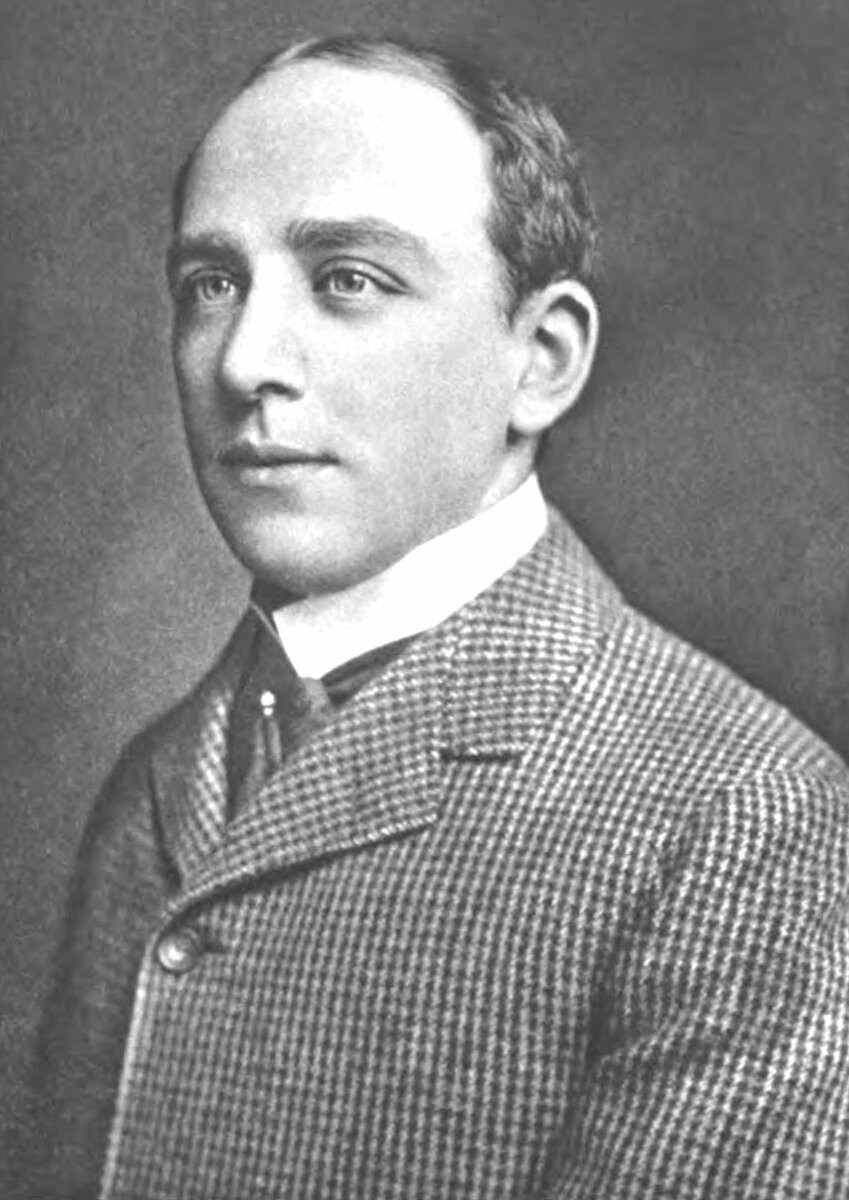
- Fleischmann in 1902

Mayor of Cincinnati
- In office 1900–1905
- Preceded by: Gustav Tafel
- Succeeded by: Edward J. Dempsey

Personal details
- Born: Julius Augustus Fleischmann; June 8, 1871 Cincinnati, Ohio, US
- Died: February 5, 1925 (aged 53) Miami, Florida, US
- Party: Republican
- Spouse(s): Lily Ackerland (m. 1893; div. 1920) Laura Hemingway (m. 1920; div. 1924)
- Children: 3
- Parent: Charles Louis Fleischmann (father)
- Relatives: Elizabeth Holmes (great-great-great-grandniece)
- Occupation: Businessman

Julius Augustus Fleischmann (June 8, 1871 – February 5, 1925) was an American businessman, the long-time president of Fleischmann's Yeast, and a mayor of Cincinnati. He was the son of yeast magnate Charles Louis Fleischmann.

== Biography ==
Fleischmann was born in Cincinnati to Charles Louis Fleischmann, a Jewish immigrant from Austrian Silesia, and his Prussian-born wife Henriette Robertson. His family was Jewish.

Julius left college to become general manager of Fleischmann's Yeast in 1894 when he was 22 years old. He became president of the company in 1897, overseeing the company's expansion.

Among the many interests of the Fleischmann family was baseball. In 1898, Fleischman financed the semiprofessional baseball team, the Cincinnati Shamrocks, which included the future Hall of Fame manager Miller Huggins. In 1900, Huggins played for Fleischmann's semiprofessional team based in the Catskill Mountains, the Mountain Tourists. In 1903 Fleischmann was part of a syndicate the purchased the Philadelphia Phillies. Julius Fleischmann was also involved in thoroughbred horses, along with his father and his brother Max, under the name Charles Fleischmann and Sons.

He became Cincinnati's youngest mayor in 1900 aged 28. He was re-elected once, and served until 1905. Under his mayorship, Cincinnati's police force became known as one of the best in the nation. As mayor, Fleischmann promoted education, created public parks, and supported continued investment in local railroad lines. A staunch Republican, Fleischmann later served three times as a delegate to the Republican National Convention.

In May 1914, Fleischmann gave Fleischmanns Park to the village of Fleischmanns, New York. The park, which dominated the north side of Wagner Avenue in Fleischmanns, was formerly known as the Mountain Athletic Club. It was where the town's semiprofessional baseball players came to get in shape before the start of the regular season. (One of the town's players was the future Hall of Famer Honus Wagner.) Stipulations of Julius' gift were that it always be used as a park and athletic grounds, that it always be kept in good condition, that it never be sold or sublet, and always be of free access to the public.

Fleischmann was initiated as a national honorary member of Phi Mu Alpha Sinfonia fraternity in 1914.

He died of heart disease on February 5, 1925, while playing polo in Miami.

== Personal life and family ==
Fleischmann was married two times, to Lily Ackerland from 1893 to 1920, with whom he had three children, and secondly to Laura G. Hemingway from 1920 until 1924.

His son, Julius Fleischmann Jr. (1900–1968) was among other things a philanthropist who founded World Art Inc. (directed by Serge Denham), an organization devoted to sponsoring cultural organizations. In 1937, World Art financed the Ballet Russe de Monte Carlo, which launched its first season in 1938. His other son was Charles Fleischmann II (1895–1917), who died in a plane crash in Long Island City, New York.

His daughter, Louise Fleischmann (1894–1987) wife of Henry C. Yeiser, took out a then-record $3.25 million insurance policy against her inheritance.
