= Maxbilt Theatre =

- U.S. National Register of Historic Places
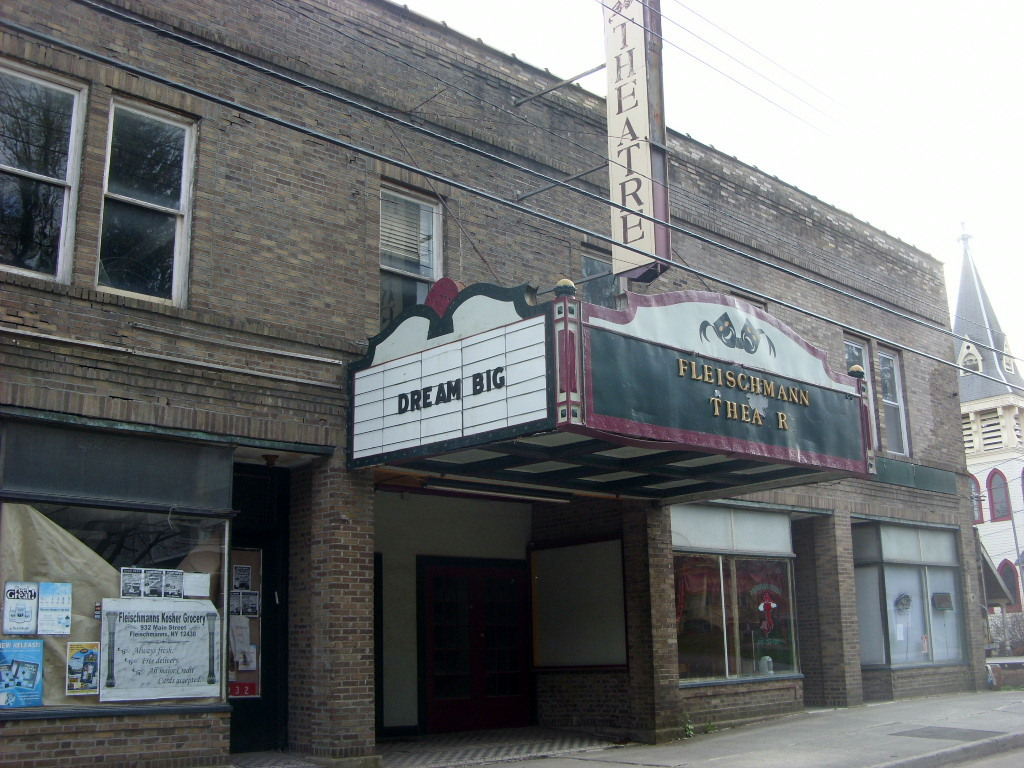
- Maxbilt Theatre, April 2009

- Location within New York Location within the United States
- Location: 932 Main St., Fleischmanns, New York
- Coordinates: 42°09′22″N 74°31′58″W
- Area: Less than 1 acre (0.40 ha)
- Built: 1929
- NRHP reference No.: 14001019
- Added to NRHP: December 10, 2014

Maxbilt Theatre is a historic theater located at Fleischmanns, Delaware County, New York. It was built in 1929, and is a two-story, brick, concrete block, and stucco building. It measures 65 feet wide and 185 feet deep, and consists of three sections: a five-bay by three-bay main block, (housing the lobby, storefronts, projector rooms and apartments above), a large auditorium (housing the theater), and a one-story, rectangular concrete block rear section. It is an intact example of a small regional theater built during the heyday of the Catskills resort era.

It was added to the National Register of Historic Places in 2014.
