= Fleischmann's Yeast =

Brand of yeast sold in the United States and Canada

Fleischmann's Yeast jar

Fleischmann's Yeast is an American brand of yeast founded by Hungarian-American businessman Charles Louis Fleischmann. It is currently owned by Associated British Foods and is sold to both consumer and industrial markets in the United States and Canada.

The yeast is available in a number of different forms with various qualities and intended uses. Fleischmann's is also a brand name of corn oil margarine.

== History ==
The company was founded by Hungarian Jews Charles Louis Fleischmann, his brother Maximilian, and James Gaff in Riverside, Cincinnati, in 1868, as Gaff, Fleischmann & Company. They exhibited their yeast at the 1876 Centennial Exposition. After Gaff's death in 1881, the name was changed to Fleischmann and Company, and then The Fleischmann Company in 1905.

In 1924, the brothers' nephew Raoul Fleischmann, using the wealth generated by the family business, provided the funding for the launch of The New Yorker with his friend Harold Ross. Raoul invested $700,000 before the magazine became profitable, and he was the magazine's publisher until his death in 1969.

In 1929, the company was merged into Standard Brands by J.P. Morgan, and that same year the company began the sponsorship of the musical variety radio program, The Fleischmann's Yeast Hour starring Rudy Vallée.

In the 1930s, the company's advertisements highlighted "intestinal fatigue", a condition said to be brought on by the pressures of modern civilization. The ads claimed that Fleischmann's Yeast was an effective treatment for the condition, despite protests by the American Medical Association. In 1936, Consumer Reports disputed Fleischmann Yeast's advertising claims that it cured constipation and acne.

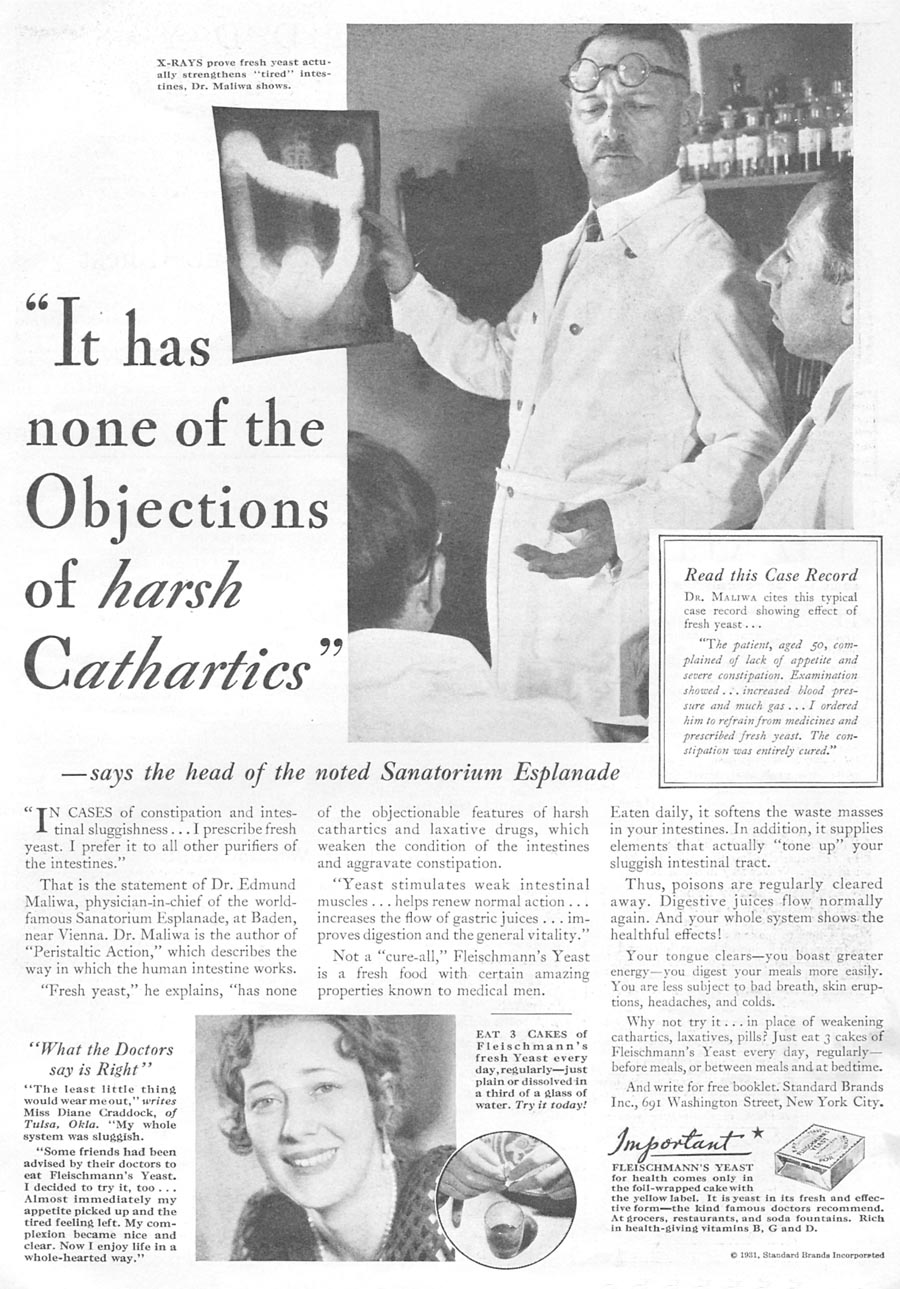
1932 advertisement, promoting cakes of fresh yeast as a laxative and tonic

Standard Brands merged with Nabisco Brands, Inc. in 1981.

In 1986, RJR Nabisco sold Fleischmann's to the Australian company Burns Philp for $130 million.

Burns Philp sold its yeast business to Associated British Foods in 2004 for US$1.4 billion.

During the 2020 COVID-19 pandemic in March and for subsequent months, Fleischmann's struggled to meet surging demand for its products, as house-bound consumers sought to produce more of their own baked goods. The company faced shortages of raw materials and the lengthy process of yeast production limited its ability to respond quickly.

== Products ==
Common forms of yeast Fleischmann's make are: (i) cubes or "cakes" of compressed fresh yeast wrapped in foil, an original form of packaged yeast that is soft and perishable; (ii) packets of Active Dry Yeast, a shelf stable granular yeast invented by Fleischmann during World War II; (iii) packets of RapidRise yeast intended to reduce dough rising time by as much as 50% by bypassing the first rise; (iv) bread machine yeast, an instant yeast sold in a glass jar; and (v) pizza crust yeast, an instant yeast packaged with enzymes and dough relaxers such as L-Cysteine intended to add pliability to dough and reduce the amount of time needed to make a fresh pizza crust.

Fleischmann's Active Dry Yeast is the best-known of their yeast products due to its extended shelf life compared to fresh yeast.

== Presidents ==
- Charles Louis Fleischmann, 1868 through 1897
- Julius Fleischmann, 1897 through 1925
- Maximilian C. Fleischmann, 1925 through 1929

== See also ==
- Fleischmann's Vodka
- Fleischmanns, New York
