= Fleischmanns, New York =

Fleischmanns Griffin Corners
- Village
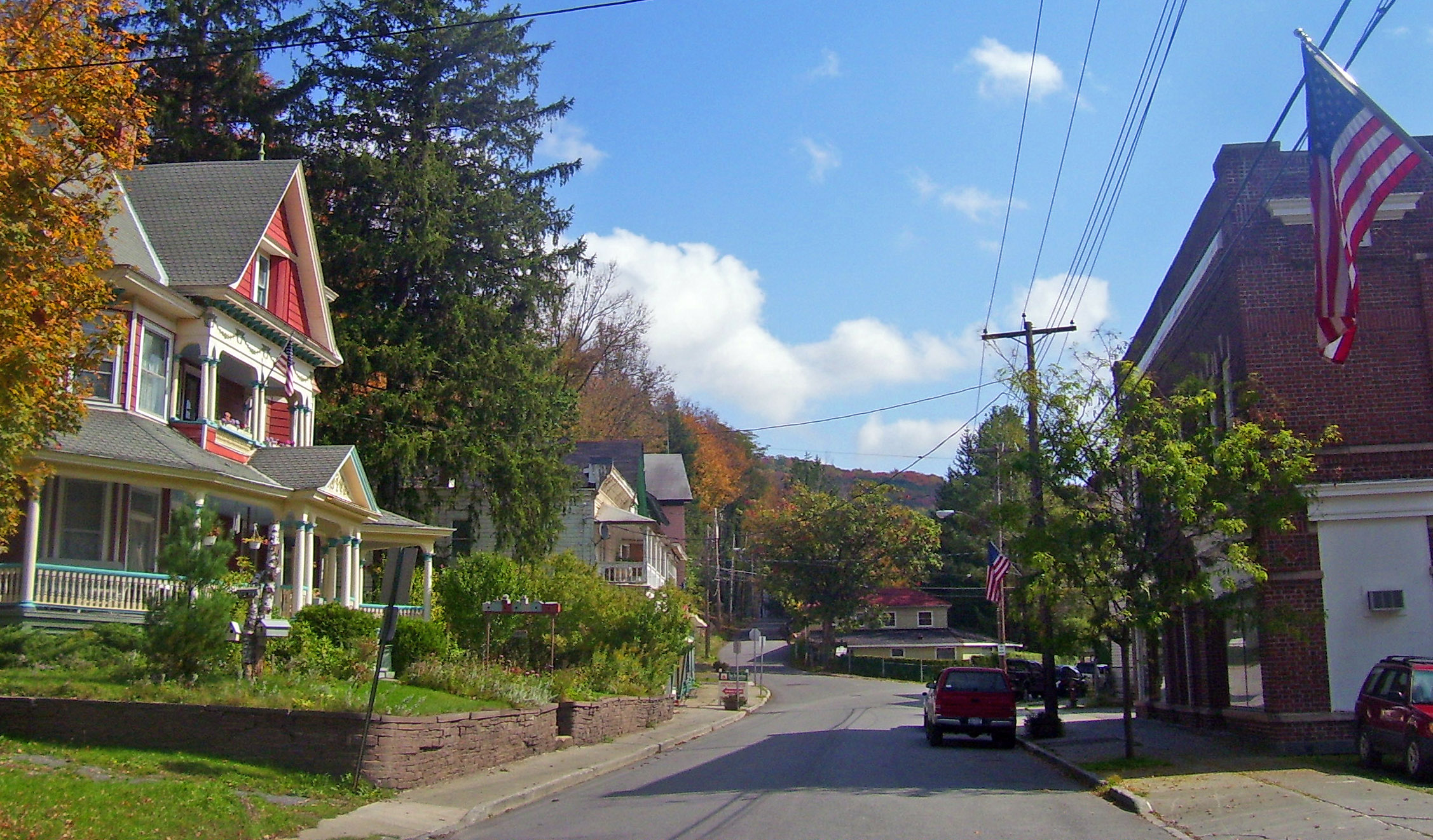
- Main Street and Halcott Road downtown
- Etymology: Derived from Charles Louis Fleischmann
- Location of Fleischmanns within New York
- Coordinates: 42°9′8″N 74°31′18″W
- Country: United States
- State: New York
- County: Delaware
- Named for: Charles Louis Fleischmann

Government
  - Type: Skene Memorial Library
  - Mayor: Winifred Zubin

Area
  - Total: 0.67 sq mi (1.73 km^{2})
  - Land: 0.66 sq mi (1.70 km^{2})
  - Water: 0.015 sq mi (0.04 km^{2})
- Elevation: 1,520 ft (460 m)
- Highest elevation (S corner of town on Belleayre Mountain): 6,360 ft (1,940 m)
- Lowest elevation (Bush Kill on W village line): 1,480 ft (450 m)

Population (2020)
  - Total: 210
  - Density: 320.6/sq mi (123.79/km^{2})
- Time zone: UTC-5 (Eastern (EST))
  - Summer (DST): UTC-4 (EDT)
- ZIP Code: 12430
- Area code: 845
- FIPS code: 36-26209
- GNIS feature ID: 0950271
- Wikimedia Commons: category
- Website: www.fleischmannsny.com

Fleischmanns is a village within the town of Middletown in Delaware County, New York, United States. As of the 2020 census, Fleischmanns had a population of 210. It is named after Charles Louis Fleischmann, a Hungarian Jewish manufacturer.

== History ==
Early settlers of this area came from Germany, England, the Netherlands and Ireland. To reach this mountainous place, they traveled by horse and wagon (and later by stagecoach) over rough, dusty roads in summer and rutted, snowy paths in winter. Eventually, the road was resurfaced with planks from Kingston to Pine Hill with the cost of maintenance covered by tollgates along the way. Still, it was a difficult journey until the Ulster and Delaware Railroad reached the village from Rondout and Kingston on May 23, 1870.

Fleischmanns was initially named Griffin Corners in honor of Matthew Griffin, a prominent lawyer (he was admitted to the bar in 1851) and businessman (he owned a store and later a hotel). He also helped to secure the village's first post office in 1848. Griffin died on January 11, 1903.

Originally part of the towns of Woodstock and Rochester in Ulster County, the area known today as Fleischmanns became part of Middletown in Delaware County on March 3, 1789. At that time, vast tracts of land were owned by a few individuals and farmed by tenants. All 8,000 acres (30 km^{2}) of Fleischmanns land was owned by General Henry Armstrong. The Anti-Rent War, an uprising of Catskill tenant farmers in 1844-1845, led to reforms which put an end to the unfair lease system, and the area began to grow under private ownership.

According to available local sources, it was in 1883 that Charles Louis Fleischmann (born in Jägerndorf, Austrian Silesia, educated in Vienna and Prague, founder of the Fleischmann Company famous for its yeast and whiskey) bought property west of the village near the Ulster and Delaware railroad station from John M. Blish. Mr. Blish, an astute local businessman, sold the property at a cheap price to the Fleischmann family, recognizing that a summer colony would bring prosperity. Soon, summer families built beautiful summer homes, abounding with porches, turrets, and terraces and costing $30,000-$40,000 (an enormous sum in those days). They also constructed a deer park, a riding stable, a heated pool filled with spring water and a trout pond: all luxuries unheard-of by the people in this valley. The Fleischmann family even outfitted the Fleischmann-Griffin Corners band with uniforms so that the band could greet the family's private railroad cars at the station.

From 1890-1912, the present community actually went by two separate names. From the east end of the village to Division Street (now Bridge Street) was Griffin Corners and from Division Street to the Ulster and Delaware Railroad was Fleischmann (no "s"). When the village incorporated in 1913, it became Fleischmanns.

Fleischmanns Park, which dominated the north side of Wagner Avenue, was a gift to the village in May 1914 from Julius Fleischmann, son of Charles. Among the many interests of the Fleischmann family was major league baseball. The park, formerly known as the Mountain Athletic Club, was where their players came to get in shape before the start of the regular season. One player in particular stood out--Honus Wagner. Wagner was known to his fans as the Flying Dutchman and was inducted into the Baseball Hall of Fame in 1936. Stipulations were added, which still remain: that it always be used as a park and athletic grounds; that it always be kept in good condition; that it never be sold or sublet and always be of free access to the public. However, in 1934, the village obtained from the heirs a release from the word "free" so that for certain events a fee could be charged.

It was during this period that the village began to grow. Many rich and famous people built summer homes here, among them: Herbert Lehman (Governor of New York, 1932), the Leibman family (owners of Leibman Brewery), and Anton Seidl (conductor of the Metropolitan opera). Nearby on Highmount were the palatial summer homes of coloratura soprano Amelita Galli-Curci and Shakespearean actress Julia Marlowe. Fleischmanns was also home to actress and producer Gertrude Berg.

Lake Switzerland, just north of the village, was built for boating and swimming in the summer and for harvesting ice during the winter. Construction was started in 1906 using teams of horses and oxen for power. The official opening was one year later, when the gate was closed and the lake allowed to fill. However, the dam leaked, and the following year repairs were made. A few years later, townspeople, fearing dam failure would inundate the community, insisted that the dam be lowered by four feet to decrease the pressure against it.

On Main Street, the Skene Memorial Library was founded by celebrated surgeon Alexander Skene and his wife, who were summer residents of Highmount for many years. It was through the influence of Mrs. Skene that a $5,000 donation was obtained from Andrew Carnegie, making construction of the free public library possible. The cornerstone was laid in November 1901. The two war memorials located in front of the library honor those who fought in World War I & II (dedicated Memorial Day, 1954) and those who fought in Korea and Vietnam (dedicated Memorial Day, 1987).

Prior to 1909, the only school was a one-room schoolhouse located on the Old Halcott Road. Increased enrollment made it necessary to add on more rooms and eventually necessitated the erection of Griffin-Fleischmanns High School on upper Wagner Avenue. The name of that school was changed to Fleischmanns High in 1928. After consolidation with Margaretville in the fall of 1968, grades 1-4 remained in the Fleischmanns building. Declining enrollment in the district forced the closing of this building in June 1984. Put on the auction block in 1985, it was purchased by a local businessman (and former student) who converted the old wooden part of the structure into apartments. An art deco brick addition dates from 1935, and currently houses a day center of the Delaware County Association for Retarded Children. The school's gymnasium remains intact and is still used for concerts and public functions.

Fleischmanns began to prosper as a summer boarding colony in the late 19th century. The mountains, the fresh air, the spring water, and the time factor involved in reaching the mountains from the city led to a building boom. As more boarders came, more homes and hotels were built or enlarged and they all competed intensely for tourists. It is said that, during the 1940s, the permanent population was 500; but by the Fourth of July there would be 10,000 in town. Of the fifty-some great lodging places within the village and surrounding area, only a few remain: Oppenheimer's Regis Hotel, Mathes Hotel (Kosher Plaza), Alpine, Lorraine, Fleischmanns Hotel (Roberts' Auction), Meinstein Lodge (Highland Fling Inn), and the Palace Hotel. However, Fleischmanns is currently experiencing a resurgence as seekers of mountain air and recreation are restoring old homes as well as building new ones.

The Amelita Galli-Curci Estate, Congregation Bnai Israel Synagogue, Maxbilt Theatre, and Skene Memorial Library are listed on National Register of Historic Places.

Julian Po, a 1997 movie starring Christian Slater and Robin Tunney, was filmed in Fleischmanns.

The Dead Don't Die, a 2019 movie starring Bill Murray, Adam Driver, Chloë Sevigny, Tilda Swinton, Selena Gomez and Steve Buscemi, was filmed in Fleischmanns, which was recast as the fictional town of Centerville.

== Geography ==
Fleischmanns is located on the north side of NY 28 a short distance west of the Ulster County line.

According to the United States Census Bureau, the village has a total area of 0.7 square miles (1.8 km^{2}), of which 0.7 square miles (1.8 km^{2}) is land and 1.47% is water.

== Demographics ==
Historical population
Census	Pop.	Note	%±
1920	525		—
1930	495		−5.7%
1940	546		10.3%
1950	469		−14.1%
1960	450		−4.1%
1970	434		−3.6%
1980	346		−20.3%
1990	351		1.4%
2000	351		0.0%
2010	351		0.0%
2020	210		−40.2%
U.S. Decennial Census

As of the census of 2010, there were 351 people, 137 households, and 77 families residing in the village. The population density was 501.4 per square mile (193.6/km^{2}). There were 290 housing units at an average density of 414.3 per square mile (160.0/km^{2}). The racial makeup of the village was 70.1% White, 0.6% African American, 2.3% Native American, 0.9% Asian, 25.6% from other races, and 0.6% from two or more races. Hispanic or Latino of any race were 36.5% of the population.

There were 137 households, out of which 27% had children under the age of 18 living with them, 42.3% were married couples living together, 9.5% had a female householder with no husband present, and 43.8% were non-families. 59.9% of all households were made up of individuals, and 28.5% had someone living alone who was 65 years of age or older. The average household size was 2.56 and the average family size was 3.39.

In the village, the population was spread out, with 27.1% under the age of 18, 8% from 18 to 24, 29% from 25 to 44, 21.4% from 45 to 64, and 14.6% who were 65 years of age or older. The median age was 35.7 years. For every 100 females, there were 103.9 males. For every 100 females age 18 and over, there were 109.8 males.

The median income for a household in the village was $27,083, and the median income for a family was $29,643. Males had a median income of $29,091 versus $27,500 for females. The per capita income for the village was $14,468. About 19.2% of families and 30.1% of the population were below the poverty line, including 37.7 of those under age 18 and 19.4% of those age 65 or over.

== Houses of worship ==
- Congregation B'nai Israel Synagogue
- Spinka Synagogue
- Fleischmanns Community Church (United Methodist)
- Cornerstone Bible Baptist Church
- USA Shaolin Temple
