= Vienna bread =

19th-century baking process

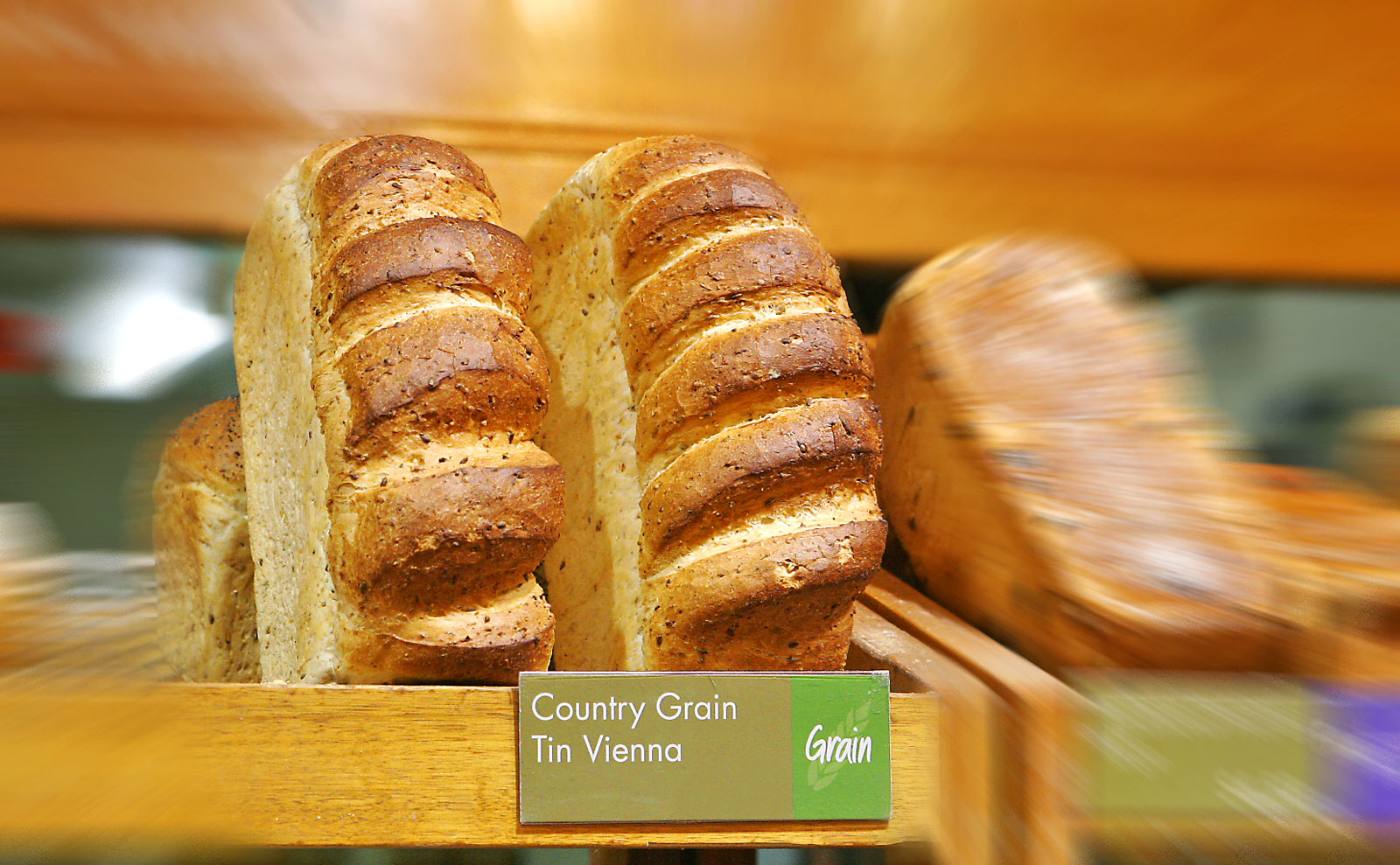
- "Tin" Vienna bread, an Austrian version baked in a pan rather than the traditional oval shaped loaf
- Type: Bread
- Place of origin: Austria
- Region or state: Vienna

Vienna bread is a type of Viennoiserie that is produced from a process developed in Vienna, Austria, in the 19th century. The Vienna process used high milling of grain, and cereal press-yeast for leavening.

== History ==
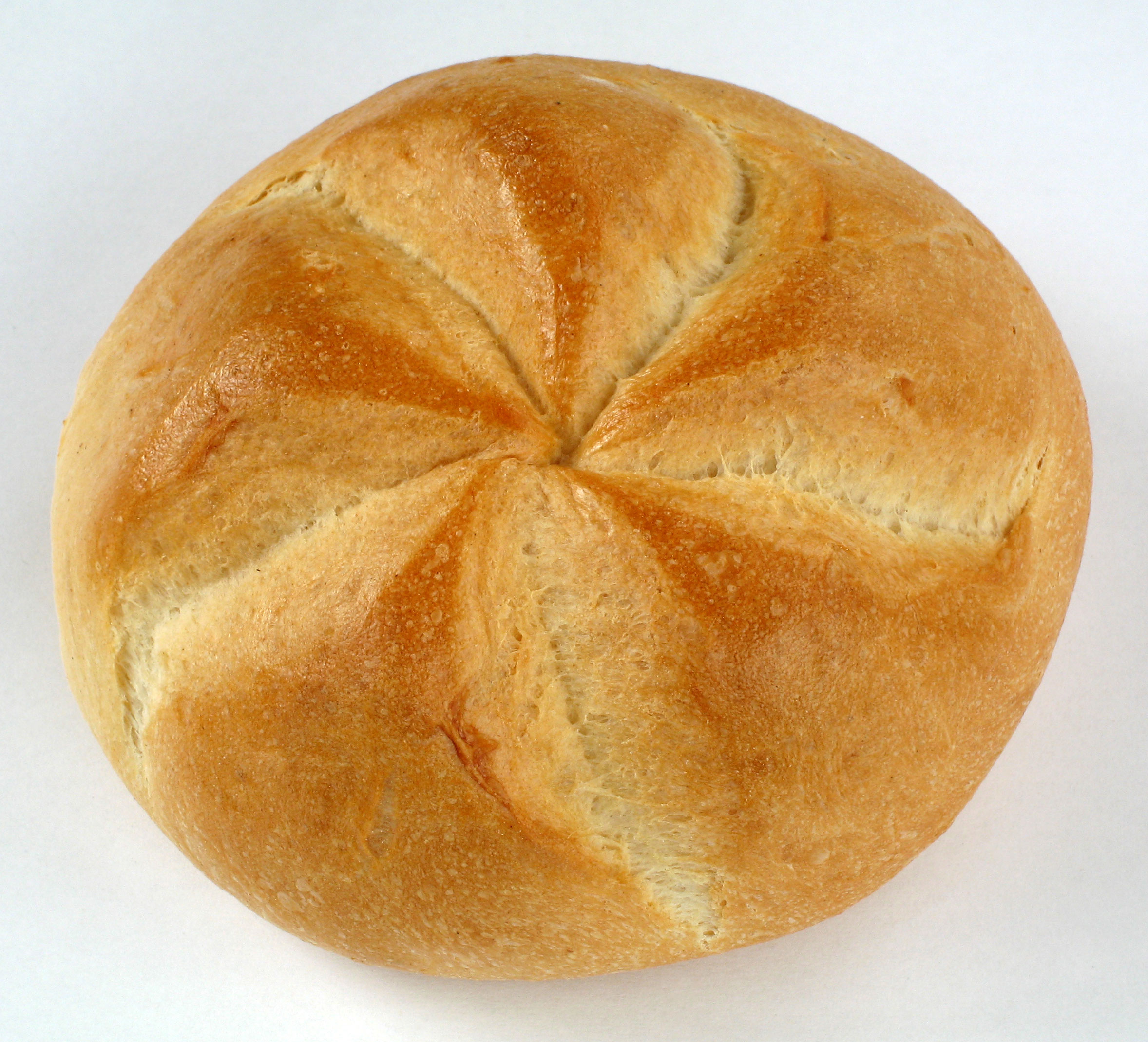
Kaisersemmel or Imperial roll

In the second half of the 19th century, for the first time, bread was made only from beer yeast and new dough rather than a sourdough starter. The first known example of this was the sweet-fermented Imperial "Kaiser-Semmel" roll of the Vienna bakery at the Paris International Exposition of 1867. These sweet-fermented rolls lacked the acid sourness typical of Lactobacillus, and were said to be popular and in high demand.

Prior to this time, bakers had been using old-dough leavens, and they had discovered that increasing the starter's rest intervals between refreshment promoted more yeast growth and less gas production caused by overwhelming Lactobacillus numbers. At some point bakers began to add brewer's yeast, or beer yeast or barm, to the refreshments which produced a whiter, sweeter-tasting bread.

A shortage of beer yeast for making sweet-fermented breads developed when beer brewers slowly switched from top-fermenting to bottom-fermenting yeast (Saccharomyces pastorianus), and thus the Vienna Process was developed by 1846. In 1845 the Association of Vienna Bakers announced a contest for the production of a sweet-fermenting yeast and the prize was awarded in 1850 to Adolf Ignaz Mautner of Markhof. The Paris Exposition credited the Vienna Bakery in 1867 as the first in the world to use press-yeast.

Three types of bakes were exhibited by the Viennese bakery at the exposition: the sweet-fermented Imperial rolls, wheat and rye or solely rye loaves, and a large variety of fancy breads and sweet cakes. The Imperial rolls were made with the finer grades of flour, milk and water in a 50:50 ratio, beer yeast, and salt. Other breads made with the same grades of flour included teacakes, which added butter and may have excluded water in favor of milk; Gipfel or Pinnacle cake, which used milk (no water) and lard and brioche, made with milk and sugar.

== Cereal press yeast ==
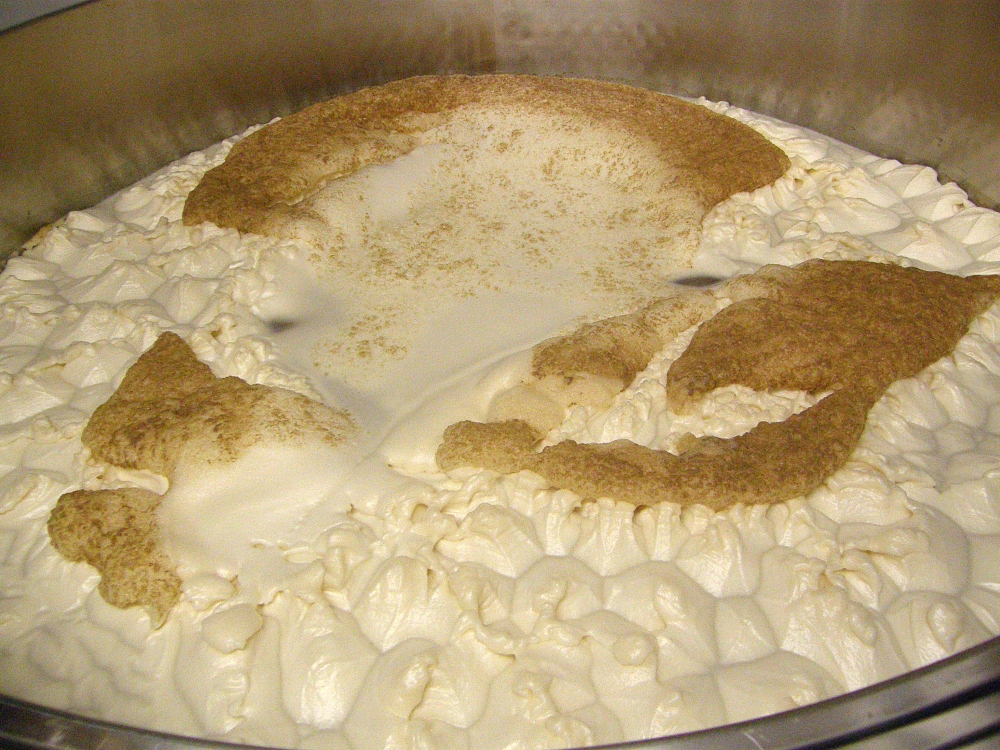
Wort in a frothy state of primary fermentation at a modern brewery. The darker brown areas are hops residues.

Vienna yeast was propagated utilizing a mash of malted corn, barley, and rye. After pitching a small amount of yeast into the cooled wort, and introducing some air, the propagated yeast floated to the surface. This yeast was collected with some care by skimming. Cool, distilled water was used to wash and settle the yeast a sufficient number of times until only the yeast remained. It was then drained and compressed with the aid of a hydraulic press.

Press-yeast was one forerunner to the modern, commercially available baker's yeast.

== Hungarian high milling ==
Hungarian high milling used a hard or tenacious variety of Hungarian wheat. Their mills were outfitted with both stone and steel-roller mills, and were using a new process that was undoubtedly at the forefront of the technology of the day. This time period marked a changeover from one-pass stone grinding or low milling with its higher damaged starch content, to that of roller milling with greater speed, efficiency, and cooler-temperature operation.

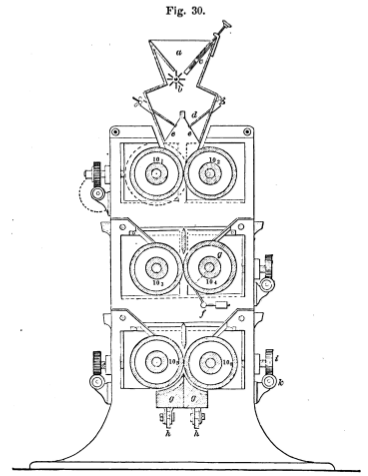
A Walz set of roller mills

Agricultural chemist Eben Norton Horsford wrote,

... the quality of the Hungarian wheat ... being rich in flour of extraordinary keeping quality ... contains more gluten than other varieties of wheat.... The Hungarian flour produced by high milling, is, in the points of purity, whiteness, yield and keeping qualities, not equaled by that of any other country.... The mills of Buda-Pesth, for the most part erected or enlarged between 1865 and 1869 ... contain 500 run of stones, and 168 Walz sets (of three pairs each) of steel rollers. They have a capacity of about 1,000,000,000 pounds of wheat per annum,...

Horsford observed that high-milled flour contained less damaged starch,

In comparing this flour No. 0 with ordinary low-milled flour, under the microscope, one remarks a striking uniformity in size among the particles of the latter. One also remarks relatively very few broken or bruised starch-grains in the high-milled flour, while the reverse is true of the low-milled flour.

The origins of high milling appeared to be Austria. Horsford attributed the phrase high milling to Vienna grits, which were on sale in Berlin as early as 1810. The recognized pioneer was a miller named Ignaz Paur (1778–1842) who by 1810 had moved to Leobersdorf. The demand for these grits was so great, hand sifting them was inadequate, so Paur employed the services of a cabinet maker named Winter to build the first middlings purifier. Paur milled already-separated grits a second time, first making an extract flour locally known as Auszug. Over the course of several decades, these high-milling techniques spread to Hungary, Saxony, and Bohemia, among other areas. In Hungary, the steel cylinder or roller mill, locally known as the Walzenmühle, was first invented, and later improved. The Walz sets kept the grain cooler over multiple passes, as successive pairs of rollers were adjusted to incrementally smaller spacings, the grain moved through cooling air from one pair to the next, each cracked them pass-by-pass into smaller successive bits, instead of crushed between stones in one heat-generating pass.

At the Pesth Walzenmühle, when wheat had been fully transformed to flour, it had passed through 18 to 24 pairs of rollers. This new cold milling process, particularly well suited for hard wheat, likely resulted in lighter, more airy breads of greater baked volumes.

== Steam baking ==
The Vienna bread-production process innovations are often credited for baking with steam leading to different crust characteristics. In 1837, August Zang, a native of Austria, opened a Bakery in Paris called the "Boulangerie Viennoise" which first introduced steam baking to France, and whose process was described in detail in an entry on Viennese Bread in an 1849 French Industrial Chemistry book: "the crust of these breads glazes while baking in an atmosphere of steam, to which effect, one places on the floor of the oven a pile of wet hay, well washed in advance, which produces a cloud of steam". Decades later, another Viennese bakery in Paris introduced the mechanical steam oven, eliminating the need for wet hay, along with cereal press yeast; the United States government report on the 1867 Universal Exposition details the process used in the "Viennese bakery of Mr. Vanner", including his use of a steam oven, which by then had become quite popular in France:

Austrian and Hungarian flour is the best flour in the world and contributes the most important part to the excellence of his bread. He uses it is true the yeast of Fanta of Vienna and believes it to be the best but whether best or not it requires more watching and more care than the Holland yeast. Mr Vanner's oven resembles the improved oven of the French mechanical bakery of Messrs Vaury & Plouin only that the floor has more inclination. He introduces steam into the oven while baking the same as the French so that all his bread is cooked in a thick atmosphere of vapor. Mr Vanner arrives at his magnificent results therefore by the superiority of his material and by a careful and laborious and intelligent manipulation of them. His secret goes no further than this.

In the steam oven technique, dough is placed into the oven under a ceiling of steam or, alternatively, the oven is injected with steam as soon as the loaf is loaded. This adds moisture to the body of the bread which delays establishment of the crust and tends to prevent cracking, resulting in a more evenly risen and thinner crust as well as a light and airy crumb. When the steam is turned off, the dry heat of the oven bakes the crust, producing its characteristically slightly crisp and flaky texture. Vienna bread is typically formed as an oblong loaf, but can be baked in other shapes. As a longer loaf, it may well have been the origin of French bread as bakers there attempted to adopt the steam method to produce their baguettes.

Some reports in the decades to follow point out that not all Viennese bread is produced in a steam oven. For instance, Horsford, in his 1875 Report on Vienna Bread, wrote:

The Austrian bakery in the Paris Exposition in 1867, for the production of loaf-bread, was provided with the steam-arrangement; but the oven of the Vienna bakery, on exhibition at the Vienna Exposition for the production of rolls, was a dry oven.

== See also ==
- August Zang, an Austrian who opened a Viennese bakery in Paris in the late 1830s, spreading Viennese baking techniques
- Austrian cuisine
- Charles Louis Fleischmann, the Czech American yeast pioneer who demonstrated Viennese baking at the first American World's Fair in Philadelphia 1876
- List of breads
- Mill (grinding)
- Proofing (baking technique)
- Pumpernickel, an older European style of bread made with steam, but also dark rye and sourdough
- Viennoiserie, a term referring to laminated yeast leavened products made in the style of or influenced by Viennese baking.
