= August Zang =

Austrian publisher and baker

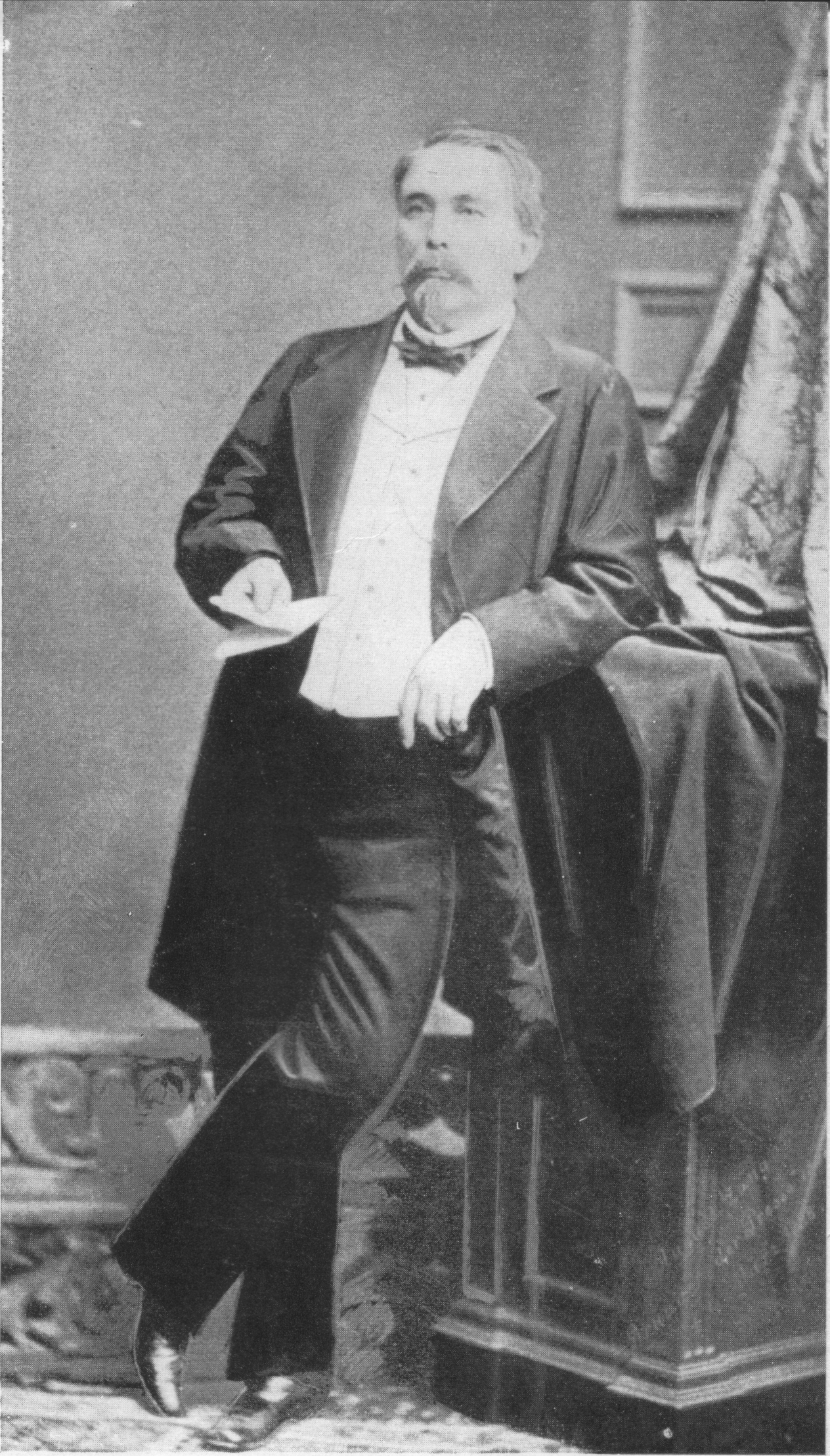
- c. 1880
- Born: 2 August 1807; Vienna, Austria
- Died: 4 March 1888 (aged 80)
- Occupations: Baker, entrepreneur, soldier
- Known for: Influence in French baking
- Notable work: founded Die Presse

August Zang (German: [tsaŋ]; 2 August 1807 – 4 March 1888) was an Austrian entrepreneur who founded the Viennese daily Die Presse. He also had a major influence on French baking methods.

== Soldier and baker ==
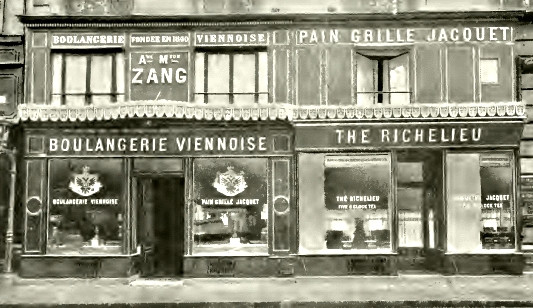
Zang's Boulangerie Viennoise in 1909, when Philibert Jacquet owned it. The bakery proper is on the left, and the tea salon is on the right.

The son of Christophe Boniface Zang, a Vienna surgeon, August Zang became an artillery officer before he went to Paris, probably in 1837, to establish a bakery, Boulangerie Viennoise, which opened in 1838 or 1839. The bakery was quickly imitated, and its Austrian kipfel became the French croissant. Baking historians, who often qualify Zang as "Baron", "Count" or "Royal Chamberlain" though he did not hold those titles, sometimes claim he introduced the baguette, but that is not supported by any period source. However, he introduced the Viennese steam oven, which became standard in France and is the standard oven used for baguettes.

== Journalist and publisher ==
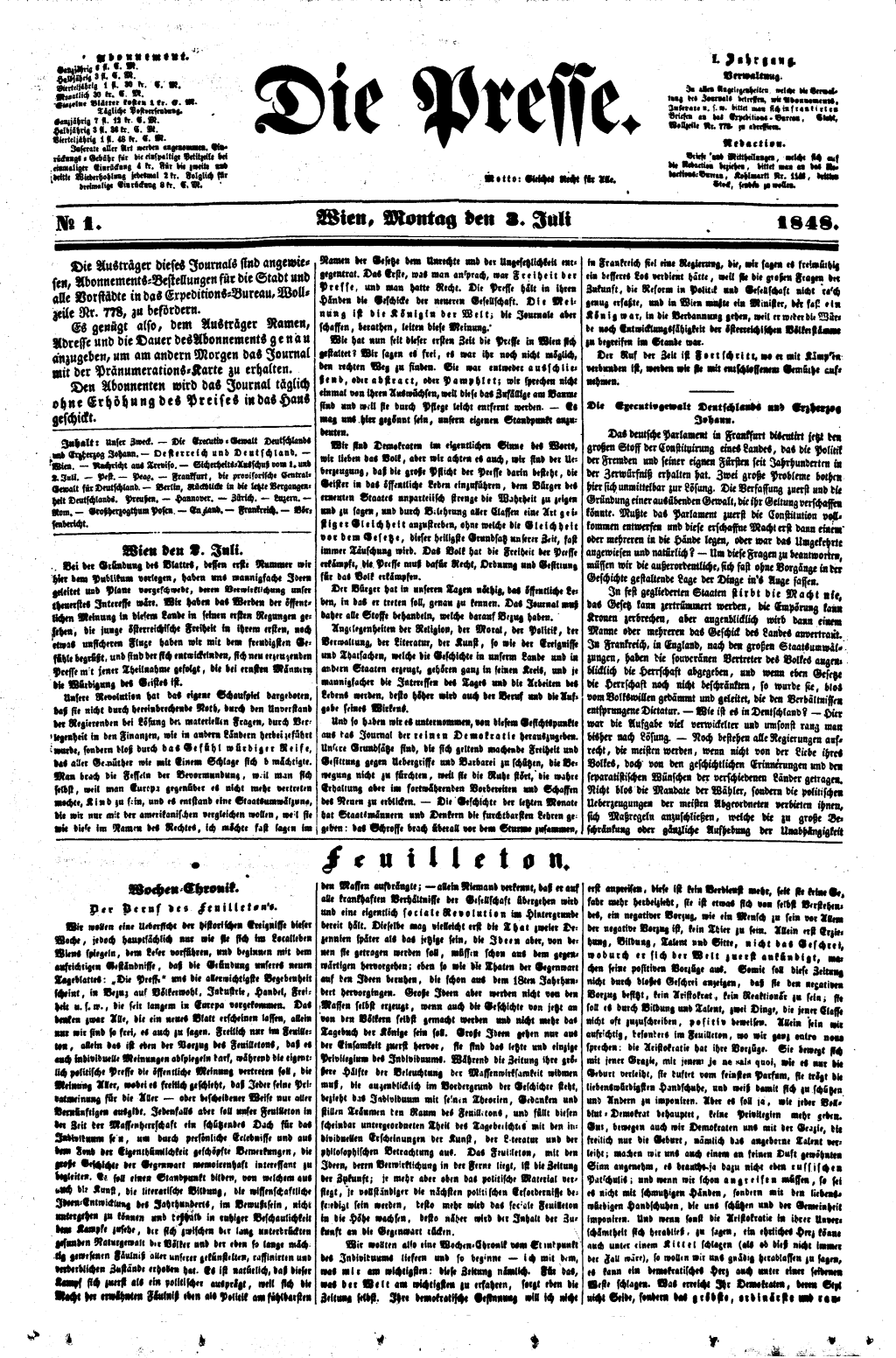
The 3 July 1848 front page of the first issue of the original Die Presse

In 1848, when censorship was lifted in Austria, he returned to Vienna and founded Die Presse, a daily newspaper that still exists today though after several interruptions. The paper was modelled on Émile de Girardin's La Presse and introduced many of the same popularising journalistic techniques, including a low price supported by volume and advertising; serials; and short, easily-understood paragraphs. In 1864, a dispute led two key journalists to leave Die Presse to found Die Neue Freie Presse. The original Die Presse was soon known as Die Alte Presse, and Zang sold it in 1867.

== Later life ==
In his remaining years, he owned a bank and a mine in Styria, the site of which is still known as Zangtal ("Zang Valley").

When he died, he was most known as a wealthy press magnate. His obituary in Die Presse said only that he had spent some years in Paris and omitted all mention of his role in baking.

His ornate tomb in Vienna also fails to mention any connection to his work as a baker. It is still a tourist attraction.

== See also ==
- Vienna bread
- Viennoiserie, a French term referring to baked goods in the style of or influenced by Viennese baking
