= Charles Louis Fleischmann =

Austrian-born American manufacturer (1834–1897)

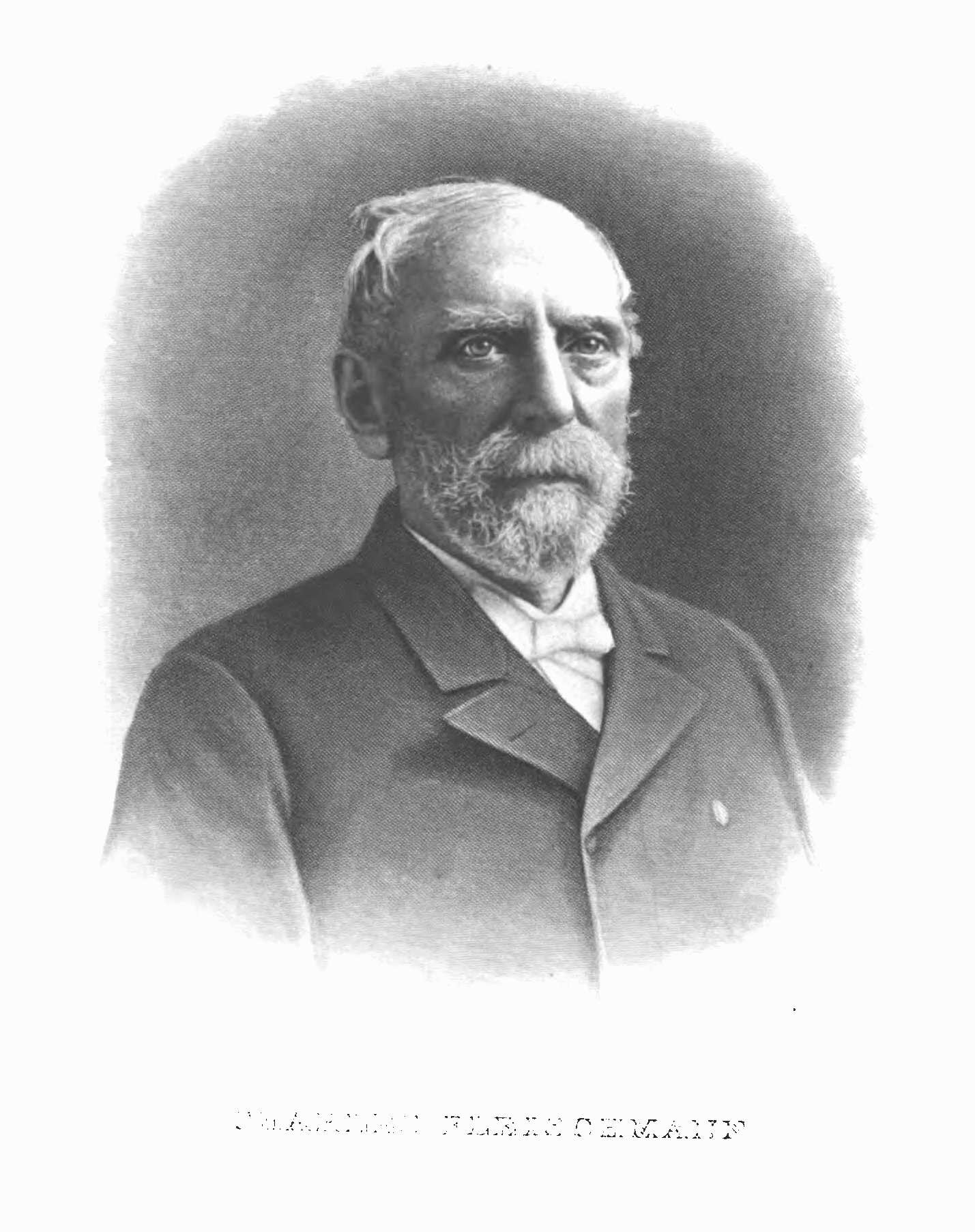
- 1902 illustration of Fleischmann
- Born: November 3, 1834; Jägerndorf, Austrian Silesia
- Died: December 10, 1897 (aged 63); Cincinnati, Ohio, U.S.
- Known for: Founding Fleischmann Yeast Company
- Spouse: Henriette Robertson
- Children: 3, including Julius
- Relatives: Elizabeth Holmes (great-great-great-granddaughter)

Charles Louis Fleischmann (November 3, 1834 – December 10, 1897) was an Austrian-born American manufacturer of yeast and politician who founded Fleischmann Yeast Company. In the late 1860s, he and his brother Maximilian created America's first commercially produced compressed yeast, which revolutionized baking in a way that made mass production and consumption of bread possible.

== Life and work ==
Obituary in the Olomouc daily Mährisches Tagblatt, December 31, 1897, stating that Fleischmann was born in Jägerndorf in 1834

A native of Jägerndorf (Czech: Krnov), Austrian Silesia, Charles Fleischmann was a son of Alois (or Abraham) Fleischmann, a Jewish distiller and yeast maker, and Babette. P. Christiaan Klieger's history of the Fleischmann family gives his date of birth as November 3, 1834. The year 1834 and Jägerndorf as his birthplace are also given in an obituary published in the Olomouc daily Mährisches Tagblatt on December 31, 1897, which noted that he was related to the Fleischmann family of Olomouc. His obituary in The New York Times also gave 1834, and his Cincinnati death record lists his age as 63 and his country of birth as Hungary. Some later sources give 1835. He was educated in Budapest, Hungary, Vienna, and Prague. He was regarded as Hungarian and married the Prussian Henriette Robertson in New York. He then managed a distillery in Vienna, where he produced spirits and yeast. In 1865, Fleischmann came to the United States, and was disappointed in the quality of locally baked bread in the Cincinnati, Ohio, region. The brothers, along with another business partner named James Gaff, founded what became the Fleischmann Yeast Company in Riverside, Cincinnati, in 1868.

In 1876, they exhibited a Model Vienna Bakery at the Centennial Exposition in Philadelphia, which brought international publicity and sales exposure to the fledgling company, and yeast sales dramatically increased. Eventually, Fleischmann would own 14 manufacturing facilities. Charles' son Max commuted to New York headquarters from his home in Santa Barbara, California, by private railcar.

Charles's brother Louis Fleischmann later moved the Vienna Model Bakery from the exposition to New York City, at the corner of Broadway and 10th Street. From Christmas 1876 he gave away unsold bread to the poor every night, eventually up to 5,000 loaves a night. The line of people waiting there is credited with giving rise to the word breadline, the earliest known use of which dates from 1898.

The company still exists today as a St. Louis-based producer of yeast and other products. The Fleischmann Yeast Company eventually became the world's leading yeast producer and the second largest in the production of vinegar. It was also a commercial producer of gin, under the Fleischmann brand name. When prohibition interfered with liquor sales, the Fleischmanns developed a new market for yeast, investigating its possible health benefits for skin and digestion, and promoting it as a good source of vitamins. They hired the J. Walter Thompson Company, who created a health food fad for yeast cakes.

Charles Fleischmann is responsible for numerous mechanical patents involving yeast production machinery. He helped to organize the Market National Bank and became its president from 1887 until his death in 1897. He was buried in Spring Grove Cemetery in a mausoleum based on the Parthenon. His son, Julius Fleischmann, later served as the mayor of Cincinnati.

== Legacy ==
Charles Fleischmann was inducted into the American Society of Baking’s Baking Hall of Fame on March 3, 2008, at the society's annual meeting in Chicago, Illinois.

The village of Fleischmanns in the Catskill Mountains of New York bears the family's name. Fleischmann bought land near the railroad station there in 1883, after doctors advised him to spend more time outdoors for health reasons. The family built summer homes there, and other wealthy Jewish families, who were excluded from more exclusive resorts elsewhere, followed; in 1897 the press called the place the "Newport of the Catskills". In 1913, Griffin Corners and the adjacent settlement were incorporated as the village of Fleischmanns.

Fleischmann's son, Julius Fleischmann (June 8, 1871 – February 5, 1925) was an American businessman, the long-time president of Fleischmann's Yeast, and a former mayor of Cincinnati. The bon vivant, sailor, and sportsman was the youngest mayor by the year 1900 and later served three times as a delegate to the Republican National Convention.

Fleischmann's grandson, Julius Fleischmann Jr. (1900–1968) was among other things a philanthropist who founded World Art, Inc. (directed by Serge Denham), an organization devoted to sponsoring cultural organizations. In 1937, World Art financed the Ballet Russe de Monte Carlo, which launched its first season in 1938.

Fleischmann's great-great-great-granddaughter Elizabeth Holmes is an American fraudster and former businesswoman who founded Theranos, a failed and fraudulent blood-testing Silicon Valley startup.

== See also ==
- Vienna bread
