= Klaus Stimeder =

Austrian writer

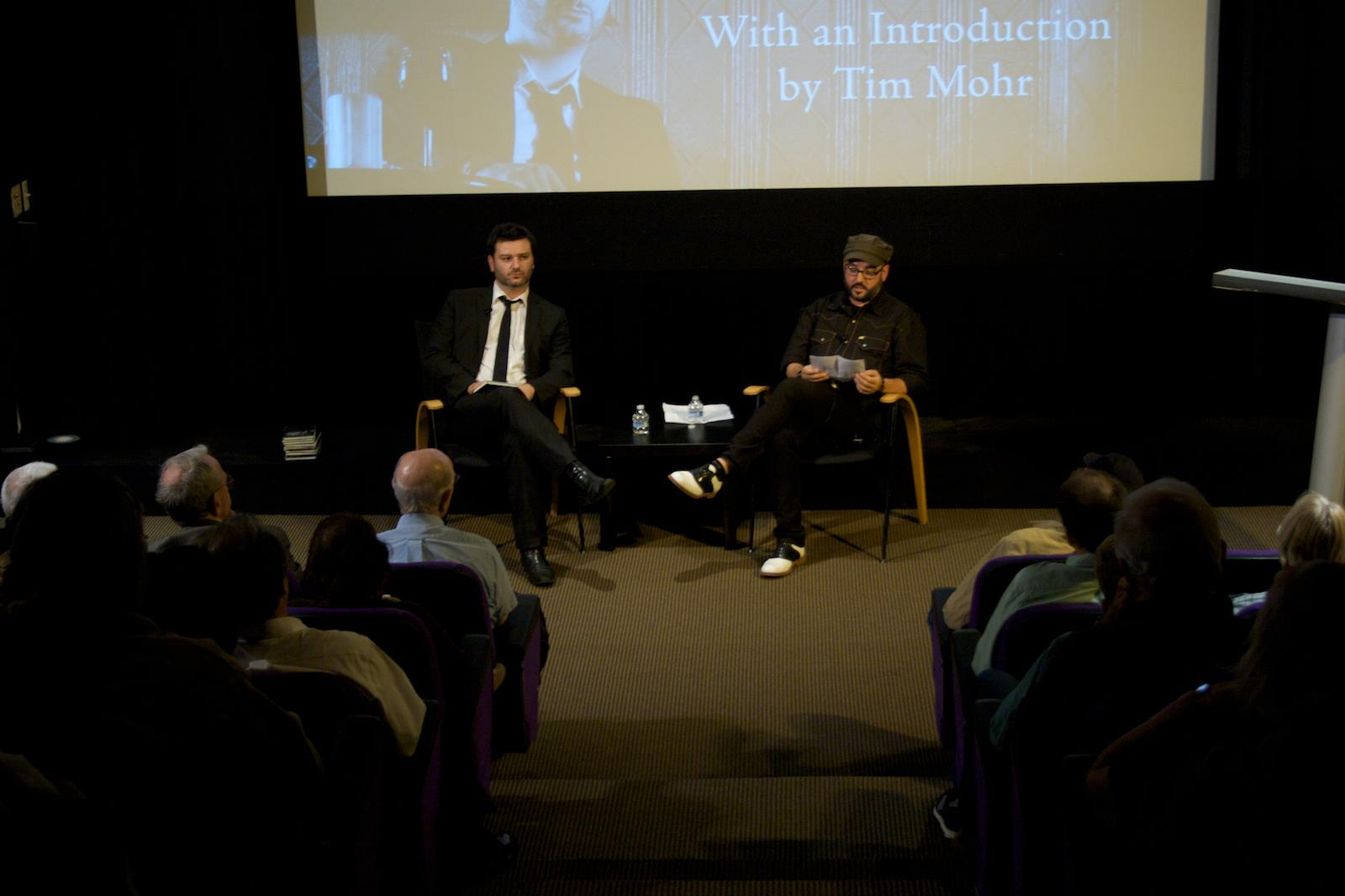
- Stimeder (left) at a reading in Washington D.C. in 2012 (with Tim Mohr)
- Born: 17 March 1975 (age 51); Schärding, Austria
- Other name: JM Stim (pen name)
- Education: University of California Los Angeles (B.A), Linacre College, University of Oxford (MSc)
- Occupations: Writer, journalist
- Years active: 1995–2024

Klaus Josef Stimeder (born 17 March 1975), better known by the pseudonym JM Stim, is an Austrian author and a former journalist who lives in Los Angeles, California. In Germany, Switzerland, and Austria he became known as a War correspondent and as the founder and publisher of DATUM – Seiten der Zeit magazine. In the US and Canada he is mostly known for his 2011 book Here is Berlin.

== Early life and education ==
Stimeder grew up in the Upper Austrian village of Obernberg am Inn. During his childhood and teenage years, Stimeder's most significant influence was his uncle Franz Martin who was living in Salzburg. In the 1970s and 1980s, many Austrian artists and writers gathered in Martin's Schloss Freisaal apartment whose works and lifestyles had a big impact on him (i.e., H. C. Artmann, for whose readings Martin had been delivering the musical support, Thomas Bernhard, Peter Handke, and Lucas Suppin).

Stimeder studied at the University of California Los Angeles, where he graduated Phi Beta Kappa. He also holds a Master's degree in Migration studies from the University of Oxford.

== Career ==
Stimeder started a career in journalism in 1998 at Format for which he covered the Kosovo War, Northern Ireland, Israel, the Palestinian territories, and the aftermath of Hurricane Mitch in Nicaragua. In 2000 he went to New York City to intern at New Yorker Staats-Zeitung. In New York, Stimeder learned about the New York Times' Code of Ethics and the work of The New Yorker's fact-checking department. Based on these experiences, he later published the first-ever Code of Ethics of an Austrian periodical.

After covering the wars in Afghanistan and Iraq, he interned at Berlin daily Tagesspiegel before joining Der Standard as a sports reporter. While working at Der Standard, Stimeder met London-based financial consultant Johann Weyringer with whom he founded DATUM – Seiten der Zeit. DATUM's editorial concept was based on The New Yorker and German weeklies Die Zeit and Süddeutsche Zeitung Magazin. The first issue was published in Vienna in May 2004.

As publisher and editor, Stimeder won over renowned artists, politicians, actors, and scientists as contributors, i.e., Viennese Actionism Painter and Performance Artist Günter Brus, European Commissioner Johannes Hahn, actor Karl Markovics, philosopher Franz Schuh, and Quantum Mechanics Nobel Laureate Anton Zeilinger. He also co-initiated a series of literature events ("DATUM presents") that brought Chuck Palahniuk, Ian Rankin, Sven Regener, Juli Zeh, and FM Einheit of Einstürzende Neubauten to Austria's Capital.

Under Stimeder's leadership, DATUM won numerous international and national awards for its stories and design. In September 2005, it was named "International Best News Magazine" by Tyler Brûlé in his Financial Times column "Fast Lane". In 2008, he was named "Principal of the Best School for Young Writers in the Country" by trade publication "The Journalist." Stimeder was the first journalist who was granted a face-to-face interview with Mahmoud Mohamed, who became Austria's most notorious Jihadist. In 2008, he published Despite Everything: The Oscar Bronner Story, a biography he co-authored with Eva Weissenberger. Despite covers the life of Austro-Jewish entrepreneur Oscar Bronner who founded the magazines Profil and Trend and daily Der Standard while also achieving moderate success as a painter. The book was critically acclaimed in Austria, Germany, Switzerland, and the US with its New York presentation co-hosted by Carl Bernstein.

Between 2000 and 2009, Stimeder appeared as a regular guest on Austrian cable and network TV, Al-Jazeera, and the BBC's television and radio programs. After turning down an offer to host his own political talk show at basic cable channel ATV Stimeder left Vienna and moved to Berlin, Germany. In 2010 he sold his shares in DATUM and moved to New York City.

Since 2000 Stimeder has served as a guest speaker and lecturer at schools, colleges, and universities across North America and Western Europe (i.e., at the Columbia University chapter of St. Anthony Hall, New York University, Northwestern University, DePaul University, University of Minnesota,Ottawa University).

In 2011, Stimeder published "Here is Berlin," a book-length essay on the German capital that has been translated into four languages. The book received positive reviews on both sides of the Atlantic, following a tour of the US, Canada, Germany, Austria, and Spain (with Tim Mohr, who wrote the introduction to the book's first edition).

In 2013, Stimeder published the English translation of his Oscar Bronner biography. It was presented at a panel discussion in New York City. Participants included writer Frederic Morton, editor David S. Benjamin, and Harper's Magazine President John R. MacArthur.

In 2015, Stimeder published "Stories 1995–2015," an anthology of his journalistic works from two decades. The introduction was written by German journalist Michael Frank. Its cover was drawn by comic artist Nicolas Mahler. American author Eric Jarosinski (aka internet phenomenon Nein Quarterly) named "Stories" his "Book of the Year" in 2015.

In 2021, he published "Malta Transfer," a crime novel set on the Mediterranean island of Malta against the backdrop of the 2015 European migrant crisis.

Between 2010 and 2021, Stimeder worked as the Senior US Correspondent for Wiener Zeitung, the world's oldest newspaper still being published. In March 2022, he crossed the Polish-Ukrainian border on foot to cover the 2022 Russian invasion of Ukraine. Until July 2024, he reported from Odesa for a number of international media outlets.

In July 2024, Stimeder announced his retirement from journalism.

== Publications ==
- Malta Transfer, Franz Reichelt TB, 2021, ISBN 978-1639721610
- Stories 1995–2015, redelsteiner dahimene edition, Vienna 2015, ISBN 978-3-9503359-8-9
- Despite Everything: The Oscar Bronner Story, ASIN: B00CS2IO6A, ebook. German Version: Trotzdem. Die Oscar-Bronner-Story (with Eva Weissenberger), Ueberreuter, Vienna, 2008, ISBN 3-8000-3888-9
- Here is Berlin, Rokko's Adventures, New York-Vienna 2011, ISBN 978-3-200-02476-2
