= Armin Thurnher =

Austrian journalist

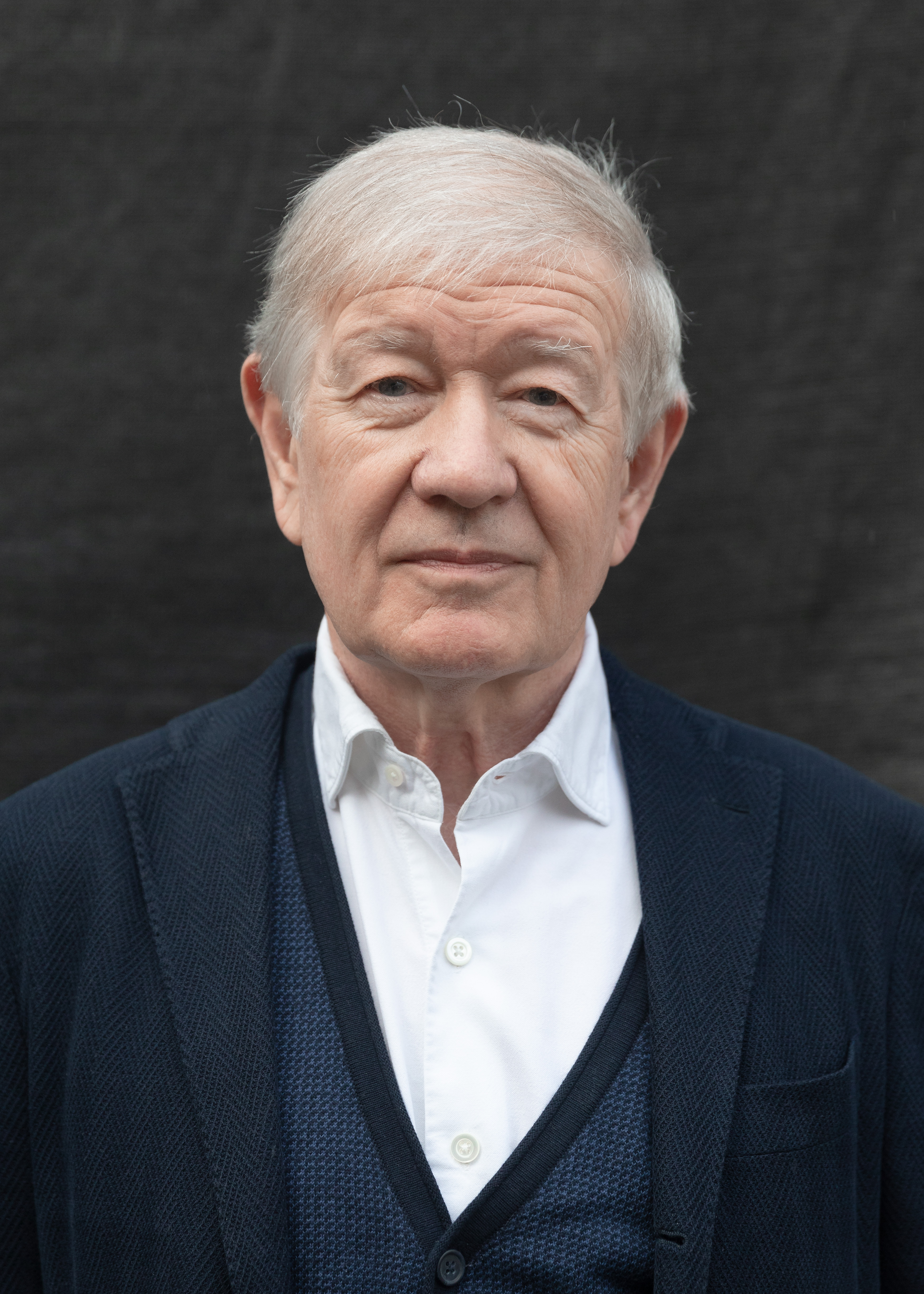
Armin Thurnher (2018)

Armin Thurnher (born 21 February 1949) is an Austrian journalist. He is publisher and editor-in-chief of the Viennese city newspaper Falter.

== Life ==
Thurnher was born in Bregenz. After studying Anglistics and American studies (1967/68) at the Wagner College in New York and Germanistics and theatre studies in Vienna from 1968 - which he did not complete - Thurnher became a member of the editorial collective of Falter in 1977, member of the editorial collective of the Viennese city newspaper Falter founded and published by Walter Kienreich and (since June 2012) continues to be its publisher as well as its editor-in-chief alongside Florian Klenk. He is also co-owner of the Falter publishing house. Since 1970 he has been active as a freelance author, actor and stage musician at the theatre; in 1972 he wrote the play Stoned Vienna together with Heinz Rudolf Unger. In the 1980s, he was the correspondent in Vienna for the cultural magazine Westermanns Monatshefte. In the 1990s, he worked for the weekly newspapers Die Zeit and Die Woche. His columns appeared among others in the daily newspapers AZ, Die Presse and Kleine Zeitung. He also sits on the board of open television Okto, where he is also one of the presenters of the Das Medienquartett programme.

Thurnher is a critic of the Austrian print media landscape, which is dominated by the Kronen Zeitung and the glossy magazines of the News media group. He concluded his editorials in the Falter, every week for twenty years, in the style of Cato's Ceterum censeo Carthaginem esse delendam with the sentence: For the rest, I am of the opinion that the Mediamil complex must be smashed. Mediamil is a word combination created by Thurnher from Mediaprint and the magazines Format and Profil from the NEWS group.

In August 2014, Thurnher discontinued the habit of the last sentence, which had been cultivated over decades and had become dear to his readers. The word formation Feschismus, a portmanteau from Fascism and fesch, also goes back to Thurnher.

Armin Thurnher is not related to the Falter journalist Christa Thurnher.

== Works ==
- Schwarze Zwerge. Österreichs Medienlandschaft und ihre Bewohner. Sonderzahl, Vienna 1992, ISBN 3-85449-042-9.
- Franz Vranitzky im Gespräch mit Armin Thurnher. Eichborn Verlag, Frankfurt 1992, ISBN 3-8218-1161-7.
- Österreich neu. Der Report an den Kanzler. Zwölf Provokationen zu Themen der Zeit. Kremayr & Scheriau, Vienna 1994, ISBN 3-218-00585-X.
- Aufgezeichnet: Leon Zelman: Ein Leben nach dem Überleben. Kremayr und Scheriau, Vienna 1995, ISBN 3-218-00600-7.
- Das Trauma, ein Leben. Österreichische Einzelheiten. Zsolnay, Vienna 1999, ISBN 3-552-04926-6.
- Heimniederlage. Nachrichten aus dem neuen Österreich. Zsolnay, Vienna 2000, ISBN 3-552-04975-4.
- Wie werde ich Magazin-Journalist? In Reinhard Christl, Silke Rudorfer (ed.): Wie werde ich Journalist/in? Wege in den Traumberuf. LIT Verlag, Vienna 2007, ISBN 978-3-7000-0687-9, pp. 161 ff.
- Die Wege entstehen im Gehen. Alfred Gusenbauer im Gespräch mit Katharina Krawagna-Pfeifer und Armin Thurnher. Czernin, Vienna 2008, ISBN 978-3-7076-0243-2.
- Der Übergänger. Roman, Zsolnay, Vienna 2009, ISBN 978-3-552-05367-0.
- Thurnher auf Rezept. Die besten Kochideen aus Visa Magazin, Magazin Complete und Falter. Falter, Vienna 2010, ISBN 978-3-85439-449-5.
- Republik ohne Würde. Zsolnay, Vienna 2013, ISBN 978-3-552-05603-9.
- Ach, Österreich! Europäische Lektionen aus der Alpenrepublik. Zsolnay, Vienna 2016, ISBN 978-3-552-05830-9.
- Fähre nach Manhattan: Mein Jahr in Amerika. Zsolnay, Vienna 2019, ISBN 978-3-552-05925-2.

== Awards ==
- 1991: Preis der Stadt Wien für Publizistik
- 1999: Ehrenpreis des Vorarlberger Buchhandels
- 1999: Bruno-Kreisky-Preis für das politische Buch (Hauptpreis) für Das Trauma, ein Leben. Österreichische Einzelheiten
- 2000: Silbernes Ehrenzeichen der Stadt Wien
- 2001: Kurt-Vorhofer-Preis für Publizistik
- 2002: Dr.-Karl-Renner-Publizistikpreis
- 2005: Concordia-Preis, Kategorie Pressefreiheit [Wiener Stadtzeitung Falter]
- 2010: Ehrenpreis des österreichischen Buchhandels für Toleranz in Denken und Handeln
- 2013: Otto-Brenner-Preis, Kategorie "Spezial"
- 2016: Bruno-Kreisky-Preis für das politische Buch, Preis für das publizistische Gesamtwerk.
