= Kronen Zeitung =

Austrian newspaper

- Type: Daily newspaper
- Format: Tabloid
- Owner(s): Mediaprint (Dichand family)
- Publisher: Krone Multimedia GmbH & Co KG
- Editor: Christoph Dichand
- Founded: 2 January 1900; 126 years ago
- Political alignment: Populism; Right-wing populism Conservatism
- Headquarters: Vienna
- Country: Austria
- Circulation: 828,000 (2013)
- Website: www.krone.at

The Kronen Zeitung (German: [ˈkʁoːnən ˈtsaɪtʊŋ]), commonly known as the Krone, is Austria's largest newspaper. It is known for being Eurosceptic.

== History ==
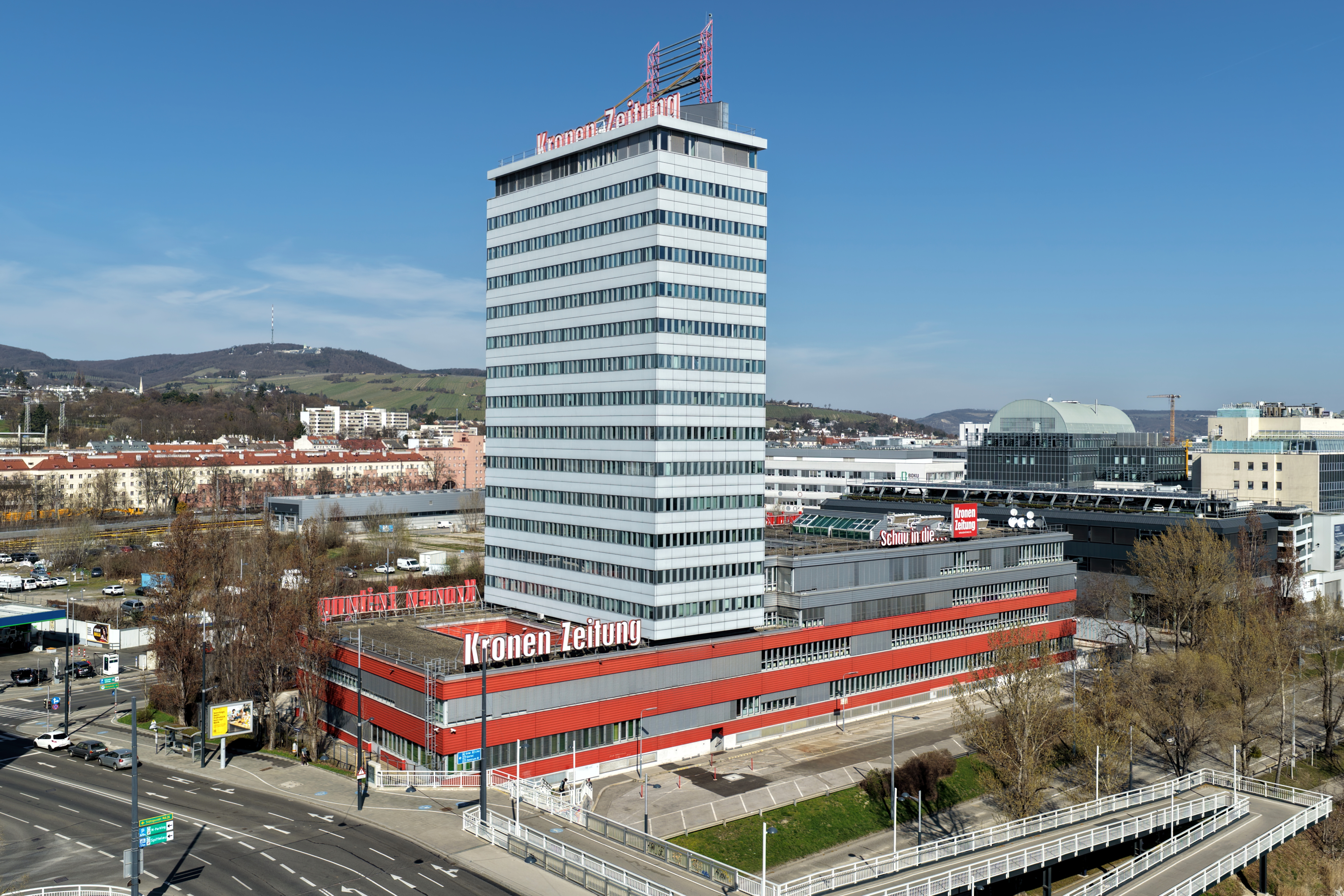
Headquarters of the Kronen Zeitung in Vienna

The first issue of the Kronen Zeitung appeared on 2 January 1900. Gustav Davis, a former army officer, was the founder. The name referred to the monthly subscription price of one crown (it did not refer to the monarchic crown), recently made possible after the abolition of bureaucratic duties on newspapers (Zeitungsstempelgebühr) on 31 December 1899. The monthly subscription price of one crown was maintained until 20 December 1912.

The newspaper struggled in its first three years until the 10 June 1903 regicide (as part of the May Coup) of King Aleksandar Obrenović in the neighbouring Kingdom of Serbia, which the paper reported on extensively and made it achieve enormous popularity. The paper also became well known for its featured novels and other innovations, such as games for readers. By 1906 the newspaper had sold 100,000 copies. Franz Lehár composed a waltz for the newspaper for their 10,000th issue. After the Anschluß of Austria by Nazi Germany in 1938, all media had to undergo the Gleichschaltung, which meant losing all editorial independence. The war took a further toll and on 31 August 1944 the paper had to shut down.

== Rebirth of the Krone ==
In 1959, the journalist and previous editor-in-chief of the Kurier newspaper Hans Dichand bought the rights to the Krone name. He refounded the newspaper under its old name Illustrierte Kronen Zeitung (Illustrated Crown Paper). The name went through the variations Unabhängige Kronen-Zeitung (Independent Crown Paper, from 1967) and Neue Kronen Zeitung (New Crown Paper, from 1972) und has been Kronen Zeitung since 2000. First released on 11 April 1959, it soon became Austria's most influential tabloid newspaper, but also the most controversial. At the beginning of the 1960s the journalist Fritz Molden wanted to buy the paper, but, according to Dichand, the Creditanstalt bank would not give him the necessary credit.

The circumstances concerning the purchase of the Krone by Dichand are shrouded in mystery. The highly influential Social Democratic Party of Austria (SPÖ) politician Franz Olah, then vice-president of the Austrian Trade Union Federation (ÖGB), brought Dichand into contact with the German businessman Ferdinand Karpik, who wanted to buy a share of 50%. Marketing strategist Kurt Falk became Dichand's right-hand man, and the Krone developed into one of the most widely read Austrian newspapers.

In the middle of the 1960s, the ÖGB suddenly raised ownership claims on the Krone. They claimed that the former vice-president Franz Olah misused the trade union's funds for the purchase of the newspaper, using the German investor as a stooge. The newspaper responded with a smear campaign against the SPÖ, which was considered the first successful campaign by the newspaper. A court case followed between the newspaper and the trade union federation which lasted many years. The ÖGB finally settled with an 11 million Schillings compensation deal, and Kurt Falk took over the 50% from Ferdinand Karpik.

Kurt Falk himself left the newspaper after a long fight with Dichand in the 1980s. He sold his shares to the German WAZ media group, which is said to have close connections to the Social Democratic Party of Germany (SPD). In 1989, Hans Mahr, an advisor to Dichand since 1983, took over as manager.

In 2025, the Dichand family bought the remaining 50% shares from Funke Mediengruppe.

== Methods used by the newspaper ==
It became apparent soon after the re-establishment of the Krone that the newspaper used unorthodox methods against the competition.

- Kurt Falk is considered the inventor of the so-called "Sonntagsstandln", which are plastic bags with little money boxes installed on poles on the streets and pavements, containing the Sunday edition (on Sundays, most shops are closed in Austria). This idea, which was derided by the competition in the beginning, quickly caught on and is very popular today.
- In 1963, Kurt Falk came to a mutual agreement with the competitor at that time Kleines Volksblatt that both papers would change from a small format to broadsheet. The Kleines Volksblatt kept their end of the bargain and changed their format, but the Kronen Zeitung kept their original small format and thereby won 40,000 new readers. When the Kleines Volksblatt subsequently folded, the Krone could not resist poking fun at them for having changed their format in the first place.
- In 1970, Falk and Dichand bought the tabloid Express, shutting it down after the acquisition.
- After one of the most important printing houses of Austria, the Pressehaus in Vienna, was sold in 1972 to the BAWAG bank (which in turn had close connections to the social-democratic ÖGB union), the Krone threatened to build its own printing house and thus forced the BAWAG to sell the whole deal to the Krone.
- In 1995, the Krone sued the Viennese city newspaper Falter for several million Schillings for allegedly having violated the competition laws because of a gaming action. The Falter only barely escaped financial ruin. It is suspected that the Krone tried to shut down the Falter because of its critical reporting of the Krone. In the Austrian National Council, the Green politician Karl Öllinger called the case an attack on press-freedom.
- After broadcasting the critical documentary Kronen Zeitung – Tag für Tag ein Boulevardstück (Kronen Zeitung – Day by day a boulevard play) by the Franco-German TV station Arte, the Krone eliminated the station from their TV page. Austrian National Television, the ORF probably decided not to show the documentary in order to avoid conflict. However, when in 2005 the private Austrian TV station ATV+ showed the documentary, no further action was taken from part of the Krone.
- In late 2012, the newspaper was accused of manipulating imagery to create a false story on Middle Eastern politics. The newspaper took a photo of a Muslim family walking on a European street, and superimposed it on a battle-wrecked background, supposedly Syria. The paper gave no indication that the photo was altered and was an exemplar; rather, they offered it as genuine document of the situation. The paper gave no significant guarantees that this would not happen again.

== The Krone today ==
=== Appearance, layout ===
The Krone appears daily, in colour, containing approximately 80 pages. The paper is published in tabloid format (similar to A4 paper size). The editions vary from state to state, except for the state of Vorarlberg, which does not have its own version.

=== Structure and owners ===
The editor-in-chief was Christoph Dichand, son of the founder and publisher Hans Dichand. His appointment led to a power struggle between the Dichand family and the WAZ, a German media group that holds 50% of Kronen Zeitung. The WAZ also partly owns Kurier, another daily. Hans Dichand owns the remaining 50% of the paper.

Acting editor-in-chief chosen by the WAZ is Michael Kuhn, publisher of the Mediaprint newspaper printing company.

In 2018 the real estate and retail company Signa Holding bought company shares of the newspaper.

=== Characteristics ===
- A characteristic of the Krone is its large number of commentary columns. The most important Krone columnists are and were Günther Nenning (died 14 May 2006), Michael Jeannée ("mail from Jeannée"), Norman Schenz ("Adabei"), Wolf Martin ("rhymed into the wind"; died 12 April 2012), Robert Löffler ("Telemax"; died 27 December 2016), Ernst Trost ("what's behind it"; died 24 July 2015), Claus Pándi, Richard Nimmerrichter ("Staberl", until 2001), Kurt Krenn, the former bishop of St. Pölten (died 25 January 2014) and the Archbishop of Vienna Cardinal Christoph Schönborn, who writes the "Thoughts on the Sunday Gospel" every week. The publisher Hans Dichand himself wrote irregular comments on topics that seemed important to him personally, sometimes on the front page under the pseudonym "cato".
- A characteristic of the Krone is its relatively short article length (maximum: 1,600 characters).
- The newspaper organises regular campaigns and, at the same time, starts or supports referendums on issues such as animal protection, protests against the Czech nuclear power station Temelín, or the purchase of fighter jets by the Austrian government. One of the most successful campaigns of the newspaper was against the construction of a hydro-electric power plant at Hainburg an der Donau in the 1980s.
- In line with this pronounced anti-technology stance, matters of basic or applied science are ignored unless they are represented as dangerous in a vague but broad fashion (as is evident in the paper's strong bias against all forms of genetic engineering) or as having a bizarre dimension.
- A particularly important part of the reporting in the Krone concerns the area of society and events. According to resort manager Norman Schenz, this is characterized as "We no longer just write about an event, we tell stories".

=== Nudity ===
The Krone used to feature the picture of a topless or semi-naked woman "Girl des Tages" or "Girl of the day", usually on page 5, 7 or 9.

== The power of the Krone ==
With about three million readers out of Austria's total population of approximately nine million, the Krone has nearly two times as many readers as its strongest competitor, the Kleine Zeitung (12.4% share of all readers).

Nevertheless, certain regional differences between eastern and western Austria exist which affect the newspaper. In eastern states (such as Burgenland) it has almost a 60% share of the market, but in western states such as the Tyrol and Vorarlberg the Krone has barely penetrated the market. While in Vorarlberg the Krone is totally insignificant, in Tyrol it has been able to make some gains. Local newspapers there, such as the Tiroler Tageszeitung, now fear for their positions. In response, the Tiroler Tageszeitung created its own tabloid in 2004, called Die Neue.

== Circulation ==
Kronen Zeitung was the seventh largest newspaper worldwide and the largest European newspaper with a circulation of 1,075,000 copies in the late 1980s. It was the best-selling Austrian newspaper in 1993 with a circulation of 1.1 million copies. In the period of 1995-96 the daily had a circulation of 1,075,000 copies. Kronen Zeitung was the sixth best selling European newspaper with a circulation of 1,084,000 copies in 1999.

In 2000 Kronen Zeitung was the seventh best-selling newspapers in Europe with a circulation of 1,052,000 copies. In 2001 it was the fifth best selling European newspaper and the most read newspaper in Austria with a circulation of 1,035,000 copies. The paper had a circulation of 1,018,000 copies in 2002, making it the best selling newspaper in the country. In 2005 its circulation was 850,000 copies. Its 2007 circulation was 961,000 copies. Next year the circulation of Kronen Zeitung was 881,000 copies, making it the best-selling paper in Austria. It had a circulation of 929,000 copies in 2010 and 818,859 copies in 2011. The 2012 circulation of the paper was 800,000 copies, reaching 40% of the Austrian readers. Its circulation was 820,000 copies in 2013.

== Publishing house and marketing company Mediaprint ==
In the 1990s the Krone, together with the second-strongest newspaper Kurier, founded the publishing house and marketing company Mediaprint, which took over the print, marketing, and sales of the two newspapers. Many observers at that point already spoke of a monopoly. In 2000, the most successful Austrian magazine group, the NEWS media company, which owns the magazines NEWS, Profil, E-Media, Format and Trend, merged with Mediaprint. Since then the majority of printed media in Austria in effect comes from the same company.

== Focused interference in Austrian politics ==
Kronen Zeitung was the supporter of Kurt Waldheim in the presidential election in 1986. Many Austrian intellectuals hold the Kronen Zeitung responsible for the gains of the far-right Freedom Party (FPÖ) in the 1999 elections, claiming its journalism is selective to an unacceptable degree.

However, until 2007 the effect of the Kronen Zeitung on Austrian politics, though regarded as extremely strong, had ultimately been indirect. In 2008 a new policy became apparent when the paper orchestrated a focused (and successful) campaign for the replacement of chancellor Alfred Gusenbauer as the head of the SPÖ by Werner Faymann, a decade-long close friend of Hans Dichand.

On 27 June 2008 while the change of the guard at the top of the SPÖ was still ongoing, the paper published an open letter by Faymann (co-signed by Gusenbauer) to Dichand in which the politicians announced that the party would make Austrian acceptance of EU decisions in "important matters" (such as a rephrasing of the EU Treaty or the admission of Turkey as a new member) contingent on the outcome of an Austrian popular referendum on such matters. This amounted to a U-turn in socialist policy, and constituted an adoption of a long-term central demand of the Kronen Zeitung. In the campaign for the snap elections of 28 September 2008 which were to a large part precipitated by this action, the Kronen Zeitung openly and massively campaigned for Faymann as the next chancellor.

However, in the campaign for the June 2009 European parliament elections the Kronen-Zeitung threw its entire weight behind Hans-Peter Martin, a populist ex-member of the SPÖ's European parliamentary faction. Although it is impossible to quantify the exact contribution of the support of Kronen Zeitung for Hans-Peter Martin's List to the 17.9% of the Austrian votes it secured in these elections, this figure is an approximate indicator for the newspaper's political muscle. According to a post-vote poll by the agency Gfk Austria, 70% of Hans-Peter Martin's List voters at that election were readers of the Kronen Zeitung, and 29% of all Kronen Zeitung readers actually voted for him.

It played a part in the Ibiza Affair, when it was reported that the Austria's former Vice Chancellor Heinz-Christian Strache has shown intention to take over the Krone and use it to spread message from FPÖ.
