= Krainer =

Krainer is a surname. Notable people with the surname include:

- Adrian Krainer (snowboarder) (born 1992), Austrian snowboarder
- Adrian R. Krainer, Uruguayan-American biochemist and molecular geneticist
- Lore Krainer (1930–2020), Austrian actress, restaurateur, and cabaret singer-songwriter
- Marco Krainer (born 1981), Austrian chef

== See also ==
- Rainer (surname)
