= Oberbank =

Austrian banking company

Coordinates: 50.1146°N 8.640578°E

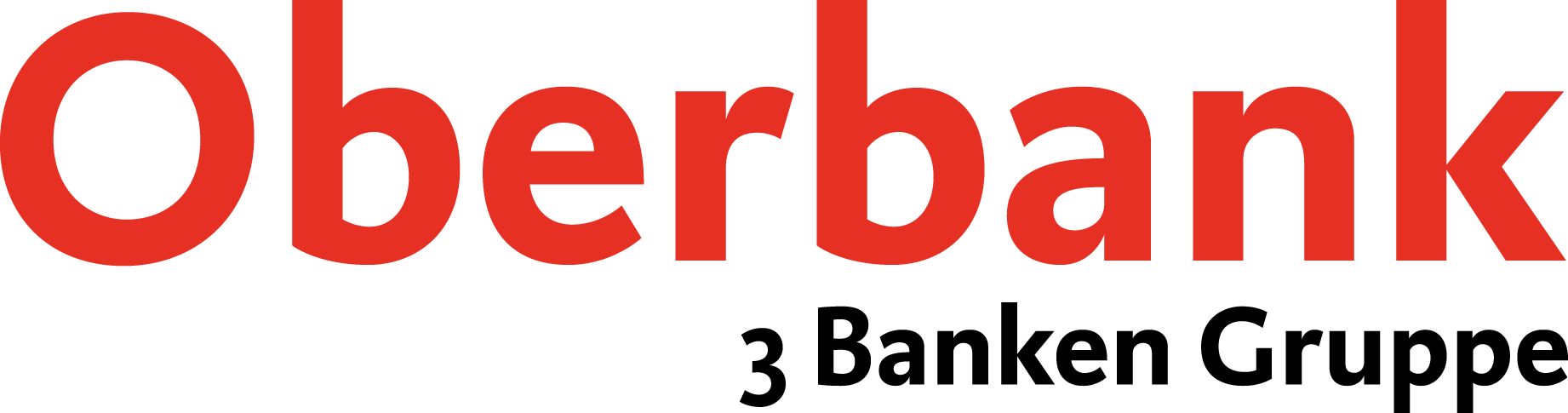
- Company type: Joint-stock company
- Industry: Banking
- Founded: July 1, 1869; 156 years ago
- Headquarters: Linz, Upper Austria, Austria
- Total assets: €29.364 billion(Q4 2025)
- Number of employees: 2,101 (2017)
- Website: www.oberbank.at

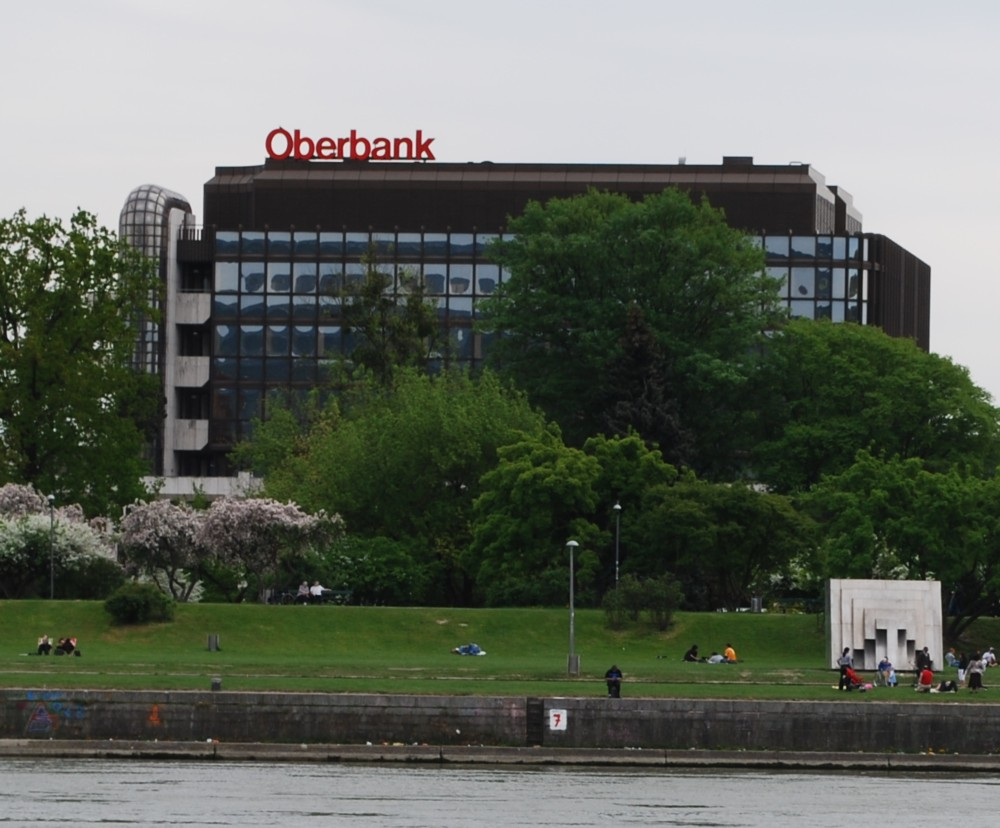
Oberbank headquarters in Linz, 2009

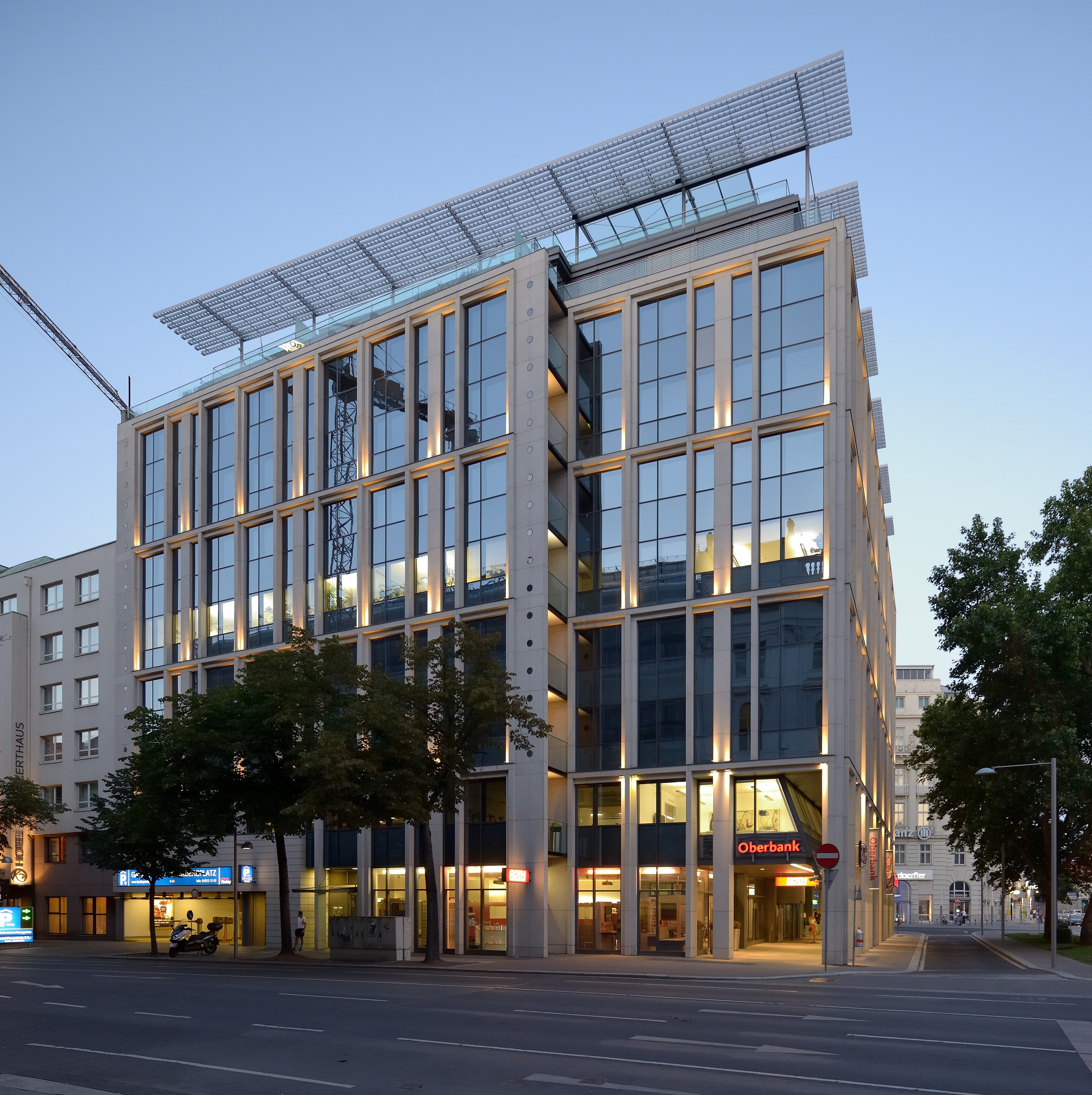
Oberbank at the Schwarzenbergplatz in Vienna

Oberbank AG is an Austrian regional bank that is headquartered in Linz. It is part of the 3-Banken-Gruppe together with BKS Bank AG and Bank für Tirol und Vorarlberg AG (BTV).

== History ==
The bank developed in the course of the 17th century from the trading business of the long-established Linz ship master family Scheibenpogen. Therefore, the bank has been in existence since about 1650. In the 19th century it went to the Eidam (son-in-law) of the former mayor of Linz, Johann Michael Scheibenpogen (II), Josef Planck, and was called J. M. Scheibenpogens Eidam. Josef Planck's 1844 descendants, Planck von Planckburg, transformed the private bank into a public limited company in 1869, the "Bank für Oberösterreich und Salzburg".

In the 1930s the three regional banks Bank für Oberösterreich und Salzburg (now Oberbank), Bank für Kärnten AG (now BKS Bank AG) and Bank für Tirol und Vorarlberg Aktiengesellschaft (BTV) were taken over by Creditanstalt (CA) in Vienna. In 1933, CA acquired a majority stake in Oberbank by issuing new shares.

In 1952, one third each of CA's shares were transferred to the three banks Oberbank, Bank für Kärnten und Steiermark and Bank für Tirol und Vorarlberg. Due to their common history and similar corporate cultures, the originally capital-based interdependence of Oberbank, BKS and BTV has developed into a close and particularly friendly cooperation that has been expressed since 1997 in a joint appearance as the 3-Banken-Gruppe.

The IPO of Oberbank, BKS and BTV on 1 July 1986 was the most important step towards securing independence. A large number of shareholders were a prerequisite for the banks to be able to permanently detach themselves from CA's influence and pursue an independent strategy.

== Shareholder structure ==
Current shareholder structure by voting rights as of 31 December 2016:

- CABO Beteiligungsgesellschaft m.b.H. (25.97%)
- Bank für Tyrol and Vorarlberg AG (16.98%)
- BKS Bank AG (15.21%)
- Wüstenrot Wohnungswirtschaft (4.90%)
- Generali 3 Banken Holding AG (1.93%)
- Employee participation (3.72%)
- Free float (31.29%)

== Key figures and reports ==
Even during the 2008 financial crisis and the Great Recession in 2009, Oberbank was less affected than other institutions and did not have to make use of state aid during this period. In 2018, the Bank achieved its ninth record result in a row.

Basic data (as of December 31, 2018, compared to 2017)

- Balance sheet total: Euro 22,212.6 million (+6.6%)
- Profit before tax: Euro 270.5 million (+13.2%)
- Net income after taxes: Euro 225.6 million (+12.5%)
- Number of employees: 2,100 (+2.4%)
- Equity: Euro 2,797.9 million (+13.4%)

For the year 2019, the Bank expects "credit growth and investment income to probably weaken" and the credit risk to "probably move towards normalization".

== Oberbank International ==
The freedom of establishment for banks granted in the 1970s allowed the Oberbank to extend its catchment area outside its original region of Upper Austria/Salzburg. Since 1985, the Oberbank has had its own branches in Upper Austria, Salzburg, Lower Austria, Vienna, Burgenland and Bad Aussee in the Styrian Salzkammergut region. The Oberbank has also been active in Bavaria since 1990, in the Czech Republic since 2004 and in Hungary since 2007. In 2009, the bank entered the Slovak market, and in 2015 the first Hessian branch was opened in Darmstadt and Erfurt in Thuringia. Additional branches were to be opened in Baden-Württemberg in 2015.

== Awards ==
In 2007, the Oberbank was awarded the title "best institution" in the Format Bank Test.

In 2009, 2010, 2014 and 2016, the Oberbank was awarded the Recommender Award of the Finanz-Marketing Verbandes Österreich (FMVÖ). The awards show that the Oberbank was particularly often recommended by its own customers.

In 2011, the Oberbank was awarded the three-year basic certificate berufundfamilie audit, which was extended for a further three years in September 2014. This audit is awarded to companies that offer measures to improve the work-life balance.

On 6 February 2013, the Oberbank was the only bank in Upper Austria to be awarded the BGF seal of approval 2013-2015. This seal of approval is awarded to companies that have implemented workplace health promotion in accordance with the criteria of the Austrian network "Workplace Health Promotion". The award of this seal of approval primarily honored the initiatives of the "Health Share" health project. In 2016 the Oberbank was awarded the BGF seal of approval for the second time in a row.

== Critique ==
At the end of 2008, the Oberbank was criticised for having converted Swiss franc loans (on the basis of an agreement with customers) into euro loans during the 2008 financial crisis, which led to losses for individual borrowers. Following a warning from the Verein für Konsumenteninformation (VKI), the bank changed its course of action and offered borrowers to switch back to foreign currency loans. This course of action was also endorsed by consumer protection.

== See also ==
- List of banks in the euro area
- List of banks in Austria
