= Norman Schenz =

Austrian journalist

Norman Schenz (born 1977) is an Austrian journalist and moderator. He was the program director of the radio station Antenne Wien, a founding member of the newspaper Österreich and since 2011 leading society reporter (Austrian German: "Adabei") of the Kronen Zeitung.

== Career ==
Schenz began in 1998 as a volunteer at the radio station Antenne Wien, founded by Wolfgang Fellner. From 2003 to 2006 he headed the company as program director and moderated numerous programs and events. From 2006 he worked for the daily newspaper Austria, where he worked as a company reporter. His report on the Vienna Opera Ball in 2011 caused a sensation when he flew from Genoa to Vienna with Richard Lugner and his opera ball guest Ruby Rubacuori. She was instrumental in Silvio Berlusconis Ruby affair.

At the end of 2011, he moved to the Kronen Zeitung, where he was employed as an Adabei at the Christoph Dichand publishing house. Like his predecessor Roman Schliesser, Schenz knows social journalism in all its facets and repeatedly conducts interviews with world stars. His subject areas are international and European society, especially celebrities and the highest nobility in Austria and the Central European region between Hamburg and Trieste. Many of his contacts are also in the area between culture, sport and society. His articles in the Kronen Zeitung, by far the highest-circulation newspaper in Austria (2020: daily circulation of 650,894 copies sold), are particularly significant. Most recently he formed an entertainment department for the Kronen Zeitung under the direction of Christoph Dichand and editor-in-chief Klaus Herrmann. The increasing importance of reporting is emphasized by Schenz in an interview with the Tiroler Tageszeitung, in which he explains: “But quality is also becoming more and more important. We need the best of hundreds of pictures and an entertaining text - preferably with a small but particularly interesting moment inside."

The reporting of the people is a particularly important area of journalism, which works according to its own rules and is characterized according to Schenz "We no longer just write about an event, we tell stories". Schenz is considered to be the best-informed insider in Austrian society.

Schenz is the moderator of the American Song Contest in German-speaking countries with more than 100 million TV consumers.

== Private ==
Schenz is married and has two sons. His father was the Austrian society journalist Marco Schenz († 2003), who wrote numerous books (about Heinz Conrads: Guten Abend, die Madln, Servas die Buam, Rudolf Kirchschläger: Bundespräsident Rudolf Kirchschläger, Erik Schinegger: Der Mann, der Weltmeisterin wurde, Romy Schneider: Meine Romy). Among other things, he was editor-in-chief of the German magazine Gala and helped set up the Austrian print medium News. From childhood, Norman Schenz accompanied him on many business trips and often met celebrities in private.

== Awards ==
- 2011 Journalist of the Year (3rd place entertainment)
- 2014 ExtraDienst Best Journalist, Society
- 2019 ExtraDienst Best Journalist, Society
