= Jan H. Spaas =

Belgian veterinarian and researcher in veterinary science

- Born: 6 January 1986 (age 40); Bilzen, Belgium
- Education: Ghent University
- Occupations: Veterinarian, Researcher
- Known for: Veterinary science, Regenerative medicine
- Spouse: Sarah Broeckx
- Children: 2

Jan H. Spaas (born January 6, 1986, in Bilzen, Belgium) is a Belgian veterinarian and researcher in veterinary science.

== Early life and education ==
Jan H. Spaas was born into a family with a strong background in equestrian activities.

Spaas pursued his high school education at Biotechnicum Bocholt and Sint-Augustinus Institute Bree, where he majored in Latin and Mathematics. He studied Veterinary Medicine at Ghent University, earning his master's degree in 2010. He completed his PhD in Veterinary Science at the Department of Comparative Physiology and Biometrics, Faculty of Veterinary Medicine, Ghent University.

== Career ==
In 2012, Jan Spaas co-founded Global Stem Cell Technology (GST) alongside his wife, veterinarian Sarah Broeckx. GST focused on developing regenerative therapies for musculoskeletal injuries in animals. The company quickly gained recognition, ranking among the top 10 global startups in animal health in 2018 and winning the Animal Pharm Award for Best Start-Up of the Year. Spaas also founded Pell Cell Medicals in 2013, which specialized in stem cell treatments for skin wounds in mammals. Both GST and Pell Cell Medicals were acquired by Boehringer Ingelheim in 2020, marking a significant milestone in Spaas' career. He raised millions for stem cell research, and secured EU marketing authorization for two medicinal products developed under his leadership.

In 2020, Spaas was recognized as one of the top 30 entrepreneurs under 30 by Trends magazine and was appointed visiting professor at the Faculty of Veterinary Medicine, Ghent University. He has served as a promotor for several PhD students and is the inventor of over 50 patents and authored more than 50 peer-reviewed scientific publications and is an Associate Editor for Frontiers in Veterinary Science. In 2018, Spaas co-founded Via Nova Equine Hospital with veterinarian Marc Suls which was acquired by the Altano Group in 2022.

In 2022, Spaas was appointed Director of Global Innovation Development at Boehringer Ingelheim in Athens, Georgia, and later as Global Head of Research for Boehringer Ingelheim Animal Health in Germany in 2023.

In 2024, Spaas returned to Belgium, where he became chairman of the Board of Animab, a veterinary biotech company, and a board member of Intibio.

== Personal life ==
Jan Spaas is married to veterinarian Sarah Broeckx, with whom he has two daughters, Julie (born in 2016) and Charlotte (born in 2018).

== Publications ==
- Spaas JH, Chiers K, Burvenich C, Van de Walle GR (2012). "The influence of lactation on equine mammary stem/progenitor cells." Stem Cells and Development, 21(16):3055-3067.
- Broeckx S, Deprez P, Govaere J, Spaas JH, Christiaens J, Maes D (2011). Relationship between the housing of and physical health deficiencies in horses: a survey of horse owners and their perception. Vlaams Diergeneeskundig Tijdschrift, 80: 240–247.
- Spaas, J. H.; Oosterlinck, M.; Broeckx, S.; Dumoulin, M.; Saunders, J.; Van Soom, A.; Pille, F.; Van de Walle, G. R. (2012-02-28). "Een degeneratieve gewrichtsaandoening behandeld met autologe equine mesenchymale stamcellen uit het perifeer bloed". Vlaams Diergeneeskundig Tijdschrift. 81 (1). doi:10.21825/vdt.v81i1.18372. ISSN 0303-9021.
- Spaas, Jan H.; Guest, Deborah J.; Van de Walle, Gerlinde R. (2012-10-01). "Tendon Regeneration in Human and Equine Athletes: Ubi Sumus-Quo Vadimus (Where are We and Where are We Going to)?". Sports Medicine. 42 (10): 871–890. doi:10.1007/BF03262300. ISSN 0112-1642.
- Spaas, Jan H.; Schauwer, Catharina De; Cornillie, Pieter; Meyer, Evelyne; Soom, Ann Van; Van de Walle, Gerlinde R. (2013-01-01). "Culture and characterisation of equine peripheral blood mesenchymal stromal cells". The Veterinary Journal. 195 (1): 107–113. doi:10.1016/j.tvjl.2012.05.006. PMID 22717781.
- Spaas, J. H.; Broeckx, S.; Van de Walle, G. R.; Polettini, M. (2013-04-01). "The effects of equine peripheral blood stem cells on cutaneous wound healing: a clinical evaluation in four horses". Clinical and Experimental Dermatology. 38 (3): 280–284. doi:10.1111/ced.12068. ISSN 1365-2230. PMC 3627309. PMID 23517358.
- Broeckx, Sarah Y.; Maes, Sofie; Martinello, Tiziana; Aerts, Désirée; Chiers, Koen; Mariën, Tom; Patruno, Marco; Franco-Obregón, Alfredo; Spaas, Jan H. (2014-05-15). "Equine Epidermis: A Source of Epithelial-Like Stem/Progenitor Cells with In Vitro and In Vivo Regenerative Capacities". Stem Cells and Development. 23 (10): 1134–1148. doi:10.1089/scd.2013.0203. ISSN 1547-3287. PMID 24368059.
- Broeckx, Sarah; Zimmerman, Marieke; Crocetti, Sara; Suls, Marc; Mariën, Tom; Ferguson, Stephen J.; Chiers, Koen; Duchateau, Luc; Franco-Obregón, Alfredo; Wuertz, Karin; Spaas, Jan H. (2014-01-20). "Regenerative Therapies for Equine Degenerative Joint Disease: A Preliminary Study". PLOS ONE. 9 (1) e85917. Bibcode:2014PLoSO...985917B. doi:10.1371/journal.pone.0085917. ISSN 1932-6203. PMC 3896436. PMID 24465787.
