= Datum (magazine) =

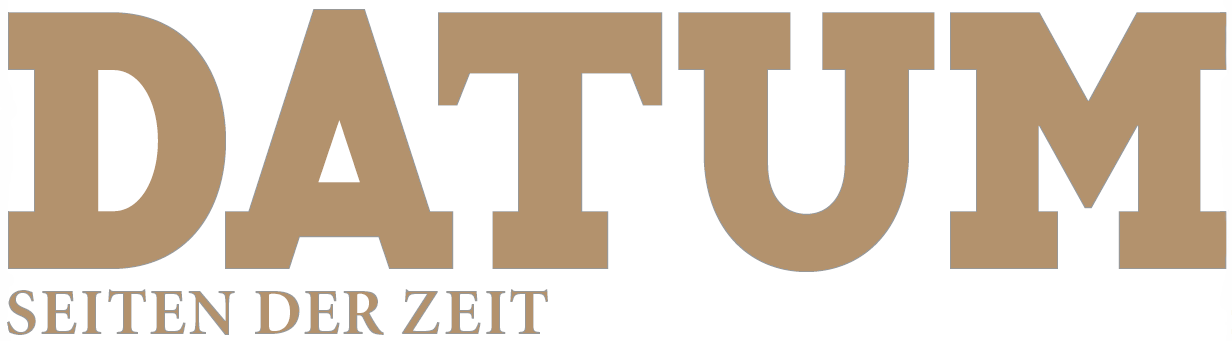
- Datum logo
- Editor: Stefan Apfl
- Categories: News magazine
- Frequency: Monthly
- Founded: 2004; 22 years ago
- Country: Austria
- Based in: Vienna
- Language: German
- Website: www.datum.at

Datum is an Austrian magazine focused on reporting and opinion analysis related to European politics and culture. It is published and edited in Vienna.

Started in 2004, the magazine is now published 10 times annually. Although its stories focus on the political and cultural life of Austria, Datum has a significant audience outside of the country. Throughout the German-language countries, it is well known for its essays, illustrations, and fact-checking.

Datum's editor-in-chief is Elisalex Henckel Donnersmarck and it is published by Satzbau Verlags GmbH. As of 2020, Datum's circulation is about 10,000. The magazine is perceived as left-leaning.

== History ==
Datum debuted in March 2004. It was founded by author and journalist Klaus Stimeder (a.k.a. JM Stim) and Hannes Weyringer, a businessman and financial consultant. Stimeder wanted to create a sophisticated monthly based on the editorial concepts of The New Yorker, German weekly Die Zeit and the weekend supplement of the Süddeutsche Zeitung, providing long articles with background information on contemporary and historical topics. The magazine's first office was based in Stimeder's apartment in a public housing project in Vienna.

In subsequent years the magazine published features, essays and commentaries by many of the most respected (and sometimes controversial) contemporary Austrian writers, journalists, artists, politicians, sportsmen and scientists, including Karl Markovics, Wolf D. Prix, Johannes Hahn, Kurt Waldheim, Anton Zeilinger, Alfred Dorfer, Ursula Plassnik, Bernhard Lang, Louie Austen, Oliver Welter, Ursula Stenzel, Alfred Gusenbauer, Deborah Sengl, Peter Noever, Markus Kupferblum, Barbara Prammer, Toni Innauer, Toni Innauer, Lothar Höbelt or Andreas Khol.

Notable permanent contributors include philosopher Franz Schuh, Viennese actionist painter Günter Brus, Philip Köster, founder and editor of soccer magazine 11 Freunde, and Michael Frank, the long-time Vienna and Prague correspondent of Süddeutsche Zeitung, who from 2005 to 2014 Frank curated a section named “Alte Texte” (“Old Texts”) under which the magazine re-published popular, but mostly less known pieces by classic authors like Kurt Tucholsky, Stefan Zweig or Heinrich Böll.

Since its debut the magazine has been awarded with numerous international and domestic awards for its design and for its content. In September 2005, Tyler Brûlé awarded Datum with a "Fast Lane Media Award" in the "Best International News Magazine". In his column in the Financial Times he stated: "Austria's Datum is showing others how it should be done. With its slightly off, always iconic covers, matte paper stock and sharp lay-outs it's become a cult favourite among art directors around the world. The website's a thing of beauty, too."

In 2007 Stimeder published the “Datum Code of Ethics”, making the magazine the first privately owned medium in Austrian media history to have one. In 2009 DATUM was named one of the "100 Most Innovative Magazines in the World" by members of a jury of Luxembourg-based magazine symposium "Colophon".

From 2007 to 2009 the magazine co-operated with Vienna's Rabenhof Theater in co-hosting a series of literary events called "DATUM presents”. The series brought an array of acclaimed international writers to Austria's capital, notably Chuck Palahniuk, Ian Rankin, Sven Regener, Juli Zeh, FM Einheit, Manuel Andrack, Thomas Brussig, and Robert Menasse.

In its early years, the magazine started to sometimes publish three or for stories a month online, but in recent years has increased its online output significantly, mostly by adding blogs. In August 2008 Austrian trade magazine “Der Journalist” (“The Journalist”) called Datum “The Best School for Young Writers in the Country".

Elisalex Henckel Donnersmarck is editor-in-chief; she will change position in 2025 and become editor-in-chief of onlinemagazin jetzt of Florian Novak.

== Change of ownership ==
In 2010, Stimeder sold his shares in Datum to his partner Weyringer who subsequently sold a minority of shares to Stefan Kaltenbrunner, a journalist and corporate publishing consultant who had started working for the magazine in 2008 and succeeded Stimeder as editor a year later. Starting in 2013 publishing company Medecco acquired 100 percent of Datum's shares.

== Readership ==
Datum is read nationwide, with 84 percent of its circulation in Austria's metropolitan areas (municipalities above 5.000 people). According to a survey conducted by Peter Hajek Public Opinion Strategies in 2008, the vast majority of readers is between 20 and 39 years of age. The average household income of Datum readers in 2008 ranged between at least 1.800 Euros to more than 3.000 Euros (the average income in Austria in 2008 was 2.088 Euros).

== See also ==
List of magazines in Austria
