= Gerhard Bronner =

Austrian composer, writer, musician and cabaret artist

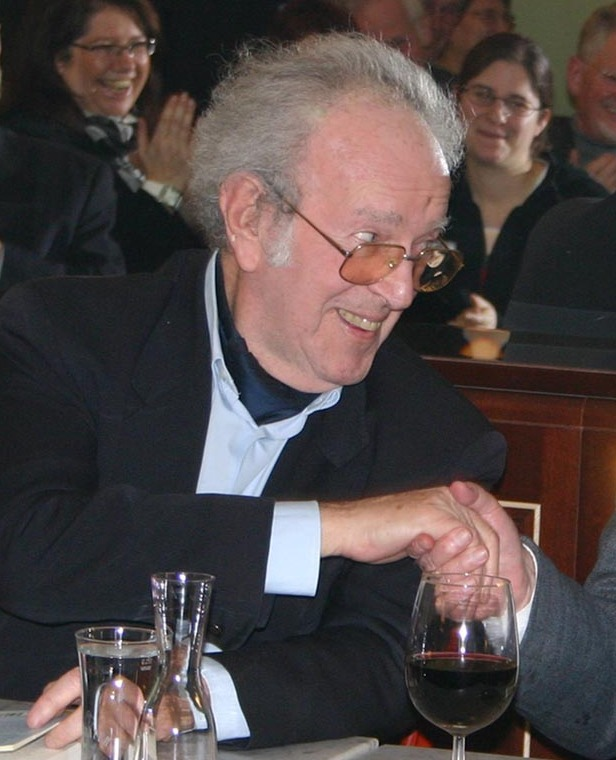
- Bronner in 2004
- Born: 23 October 1922; Favoriten, Vienna, Austria
- Died: 19 January 2007 (aged 84); Vienna, Austria

Gerhard Bronner (23 October 1922 in Favoriten, Vienna – 19 January 2007 in Vienna) was an Austrian composer, writer, musician and a cabaret artist, known for his contribution to Austrian culture in the post-World War II period.

== Life ==
Born to a Jewish family, his parents and elder brothers were detained in Dachau concentration camp after Germany had invaded Austria. Bronner fled from occupied Austria to Czechoslovakia and later to Palestine, where he started his musical career. In 1948 he returned to Vienna and originally had planned to stay only for a few weeks and then to move on to London. But he chose Vienna as his permanent residence after having been offered a chance to work there.

Bronner took over a dubious night-club called "Marietta-Bar" which he transformed into a small theater. There Bronner assembled a group of young artists which would later become renowned Austrian actors and cabaret artists. Among them were Georg Kreisler and Helmut Qualtinger for whom Bronner wrote many songs. Bronner and Qualtinger also appeared together in the "Travnicek"-dialogs, with Qualtinger playing an ignorant but at the same time astute Viennese who cunningly answered Bronner's provoking questions.

In the mid-1980s, disheartened by his country's sharp turn to the right (Kurt Waldheim's presidency) and dismayed by the antisemitism he felt was becoming more prevalent there, Bronner moved to the United States, and lived in Boca Raton, Florida. Suddenly free from the demands of celebrity, he began to relax and enjoy the more casual American lifestyle. An avid collector of movies, his Florida home contained more than 8,000 titles, some rare. Bronner continued to compose and write, and frequently visited Vienna to do concerts, book tours and television appearances. After nearly 15 years in the States — and after having become a naturalized American citizen — an opportunity arose to return to his beloved Vienna, where he was asked to run a small independent theater.

Bronner died of a stroke in 2007, aged 84. Only two weeks before his death he had performed on stage for the last time. This show was recorded and broadcast on Austrian television one day after Bronner's death. He was the father of magazine founder/newspaper editor Oscar Bronner. Throughout his life Bronner emphasized his Jewishness, although he was not religious.

== Honours and awards ==
- Austrian Cross of Honour for Science and Art (1978)
- Johann Nestroy Ring of Vienna (1979)
- Golden Medal of Honour of the City of Vienna (2002)
- German Cabaret Award (2005)
- Gerhard-Bronner-Strasse at Wien Hauptbahnhof (2009)

== Works ==
- Glasl vorm Aug. (with Carl Merz and Helmut Qualtinger; Preface by Axel von Ambesser); Langen/Müller, München 1960.
- Trautes Heim. Heitere Szenen eeiner Ehe. (with Lore Krainer); Amalthea, Wien 1983, ISBN 3-85002-186-6.
- Kein Blattl vor'm Mund. Ein ungeschriebenes Buch. (Prologue by Lore Krainer; Epilogue by Fritz Muliar, Peter Orthofer, Erwin Steinhauer and other); Astor Verlag, Wien 1992, ISBN 3-900277-16-8.
- Die goldene Zeit des Wiener Cabarets. (incl. 1 CD); Hannibal Verlag, St. Andrä-Wördern 1995, ISBN 3-85445-115-6.

Reissue as: Meine Jahre mit Qualtinger. Amalthea Verlag, Wien 2003, ISBN 3-85002-499-7.

- Tränen gelacht. Der jüdische Humor. Amalthea, Wien 1999, ISBN 3-85002-439-3.
- Spiegel vorm Gesicht. Erinnerungen. Deutsche Verlags-Anstalt, München 2004, ISBN 3-421-05812-1.
