= Profil (magazine) =

Weekly news magazine in Austria

- Editor-in-chief: Anna Thalhammer
- Former editors: Christian Rainer
- Categories: News magazine
- Frequency: Weekly
- Circulation: 34,649 sold copies
- Publisher: Profil Redaktion GmbH
- Founder: Oscar Bronner
- First issue: 7 September 1970; 56 years ago
- Company: Profil Redaktion GmbH
- Country: Austria
- Based in: Vienna
- Language: German
- Website: www.profil.at
- ISSN: 1022-2111

Profil (stylized as profil) is an Austrian weekly news magazine published in German and based in Vienna. It was founded by Oscar Bronner in 1970 as a monthly magazine and later became a weekly. The magazine is known for political reporting and investigative journalism in Austria. It is sometimes considered the Austrian counterpart to Der Spiegel. In 2008 the magazine was described as the "most important Austrian news magazine".

== History and profile ==
Profil was founded in 1970 by Oscar Bronner, who also founded the business magazine trend and the daily newspaper Der Standard. The magazine is headquartered in Vienna.

The first edition of Profil came out as a monthly on 7 September 1970. Starting in October 1972, it was published every two weeks and from January 1974 every week. The first issue had a cover illustration by Erich Sokol and the lead story "FPÖ zwischen Macht und Pleite". Its initial circulation was 25,000 copies and the cover price was 20 Austrian schillings. In 1975 the business magazine ecco merged with Profil.

Profil includes sections for Austria, abroad, economy, society, science, and culture. Glosses, caricatures, and letters to the editor are also published. In the mid-1980s it had an independent and liberal leaning. In the 2000s the magazine was described as having a left-liberal political stance. It targets Austria's intelligentsia. Both Profil and trend initiated investigative journalism in the country.

In 1980, Profil journalist Alfred Worm reported extensively on the AKH scandal, a corruption affair connected to the construction of the Vienna General Hospital. The magazine also played a major role in the Waldheim affair. In 1986, Profil journalist Hubertus Czernin published documents concerning Kurt Waldheim's concealed wartime record during Waldheim's presidential campaign. Czernin later served as the political editor of Profil.

On 27 March 1995, Profil published allegations of sexual abuse against Cardinal Hans Hermann Groër, then Archbishop of Vienna. The reporting contributed to one of the major scandals in recent Austrian church history and preceded Groër's resignation as archbishop.

Christian Rainer succeeded Josef Votzi as publisher and editor-in-chief in 1998. The chief editorial staff later included Sven Gächter, Stefan Janny, and Herbert Lackner. In 1998 the newly founded weekly magazine Format became a direct competitor of Profil.

Following the 2001 magazine merger, Profil was organizationally split between the News group and the Kurier group. In 2019, Kurier took over the remaining publishing and economic functions, bringing the magazine fully back under the Kurier media house. The media owner of the magazine is Profil Redaktion GmbH, which is wholly owned by Kurier Zeitungsverlag und Druckerei GmbH.

=== Restructuring after 2022 ===
In December 2022 it was announced that Richard Grasl would also become Profil managing director in addition to his journalistic work for the Kurier. On the same day it was announced that Christian Rainer would end his role as editor-in-chief and publisher of Profil. Due to Grasl's appointment, the editorial team publicly emphasized the magazine's "untouchable journalistic independence". At the same time, management reported three Profil editors to the works council for termination.

The editorial company led by Grasl became the new publisher in January 2023. Anna Thalhammer became editor-in-chief on 1 March 2023.

The economics department head and deputy editor-in-chief Michael Nikbakhsh also left the magazine in this context. He was offered the opportunity to run the planned investigative academy of Kurier and Profil as a self-employed person. Before the academy started, Nikbakhsh resigned from its leadership in February 2023. According to Nikbakhsh, a program he had presented to Richard Grasl, Martina Salomon and Anna Thalhammer led to a dispute over the perceived political affiliation of proposed speakers. Salomon, Grasl, and Thalhammer disputed Nikbakhsh's account.

Since January 2025, Thalhammer has also served as publisher of the magazine.

== Circulation ==
The circulation of Profil was 72,000 copies in 1985. In 1993, the magazine had a circulation of more than 100,000 copies.

The weekly had a circulation of 76,000 copies in 2003 and 78,000 copies in the first quarter of 2004. In 2006, the magazine had a readership of 6%, being second to News magazine. The circulation of the magazine was 251,000 copies in 2007. Its circulation for the first half of 2008 was 59,124 copies. The 2010 circulation of Profil was 93,000 copies. The circulation of the magazine during the first half of 2013 was down to 71,033 copies. According to the Austrian Circulation Control, the sold circulation in the 2024 rolling annual average was 34,649 copies.

== See also ==
- List of magazines in Austria
