= News (publishing) =

Austrian publishing company

News Publishing Group
- Native name: Verlagsgruppe News Gesellschaft
- Industry: News Media
- Headquarters: Austria
- Products: News; News Online; Profil
- Number of employees: 500+ (2004)

Verlagsgruppe News Gesellschaft m.b.H. (News Publishing Group) is an Austrian publishing company that publishes fifteen magazines, including Profil and News, two weekly news magazines, and News online.

News has over 500 employees and approximately 60% of the magazine advertising market in Austria.

Prior to their merger in 2001, leadership in the Austrian magazine market was contested between News and the Kurier Group, which at that time published Profil. The merger was unsuccessfully challenged by seven Austrian newspapers. News is controlled by Gruner + Jahr, a printing and publishing company with headquarters in Hamburg, who own 56 percent of the stock.
