= Oscar Bronner =

Austrian publisher, journalist and artist

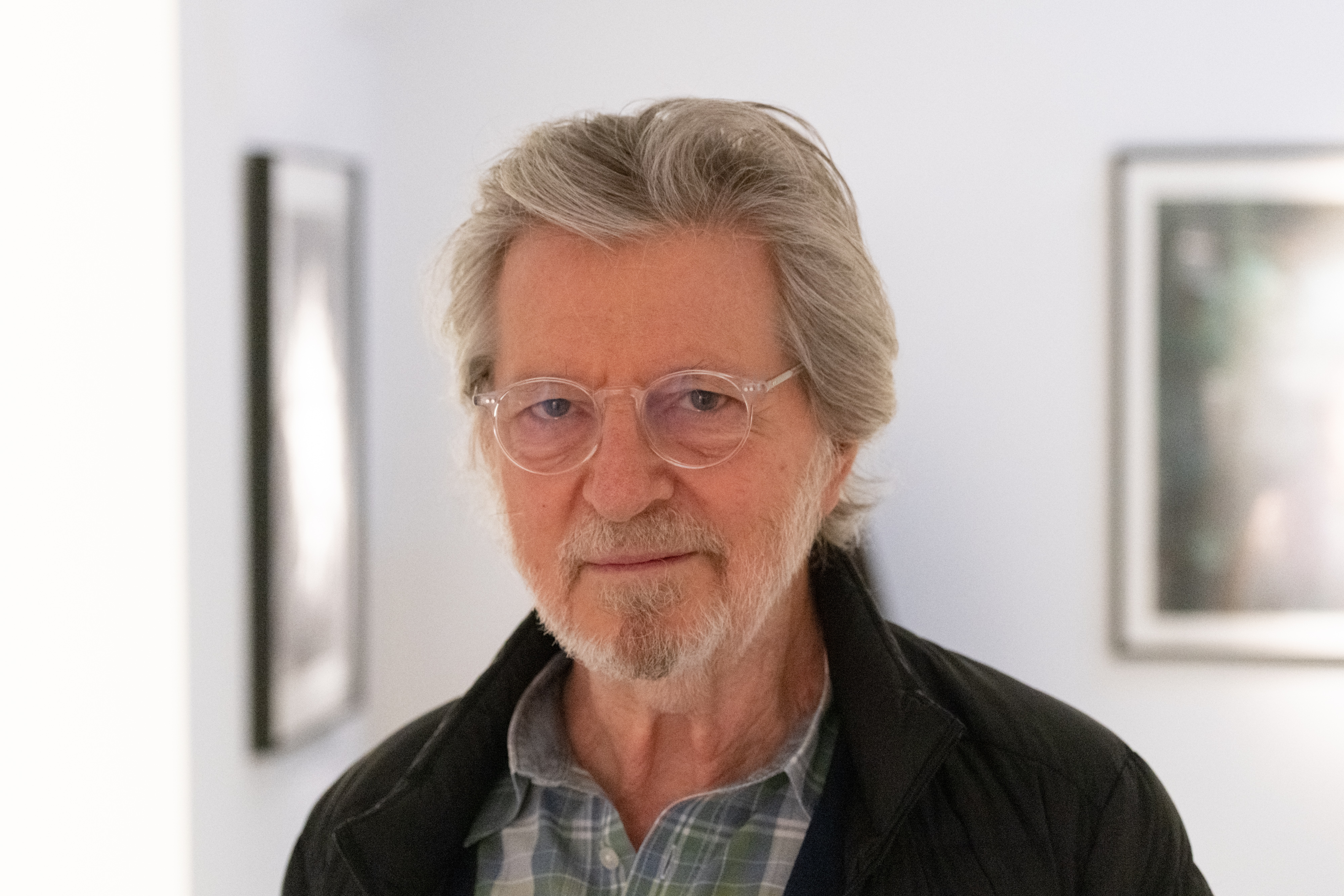
- Bronner in 2023
- Born: 14 January 1943 (age 83); Haifa, Mandatory Palestine (now Israel)
- Occupations: publisher, journalist, painter, sculptor
- Years active: 1970s–present
- Father: Gerhard Bronner
- Website: oscarbronner.com

Oscar Bronner (born 14 January 1943) is an Austrian publisher, journalist, painter and sculptor. He founded the Austrian magazines trend and profil in 1970 and the daily newspaper Der Standard in 1988.

== Early life ==
Bronner was born in Haifa, Mandatory Palestine, as the eldest son of Austrian cabaret artist, composer and writer Gerhard Bronner. His father had fled Austria after the Anschluss in 1938. In 1948, Bronner moved with his family to Vienna, where they settled after leaving Haifa.

Bronner grew up in an artistic environment shaped by his father's work in cabaret and theatre. He later worked in journalism, including for the Arbeiter-Zeitung, Express and Kurier, before founding his own media titles.

== Publishing career ==
In 1970, Bronner founded the monthly business magazine trend and, shortly afterwards, the news magazine profil. In 1974, he sold his majority stakes in both magazines and moved to New York, where he worked as a painter and sculptor.

After more than a decade in New York, Bronner returned to Vienna and founded the daily newspaper Der Standard. The first issue appeared on 19 October 1988. The paper was launched in the context of debates around Kurt Waldheim and the perceived need for a liberal Austrian daily newspaper. Its salmon-coloured paper was modelled on the Financial Times, reflecting its original emphasis on business and financial journalism.

Der Standard was founded with a 50 percent stake held by the German Axel Springer group. Bronner bought back Springer's stake in 1995. In 1998, the Süddeutscher Verlag acquired 49 percent of the newspaper; Bronner bought back those shares in 2008.

In November 2012, Bronner was elected president of the Austrian Press Council. In 2014, he withdrew from the operational management of Der Standard, left the board and moved to the supervisory board, while remaining the newspaper's publisher. His son Alexander Mitteräcker later took over the management of the Standard Group.

== Legal case ==
Bronner's publishing company was involved in the European competition-law case Oscar Bronner GmbH & Co KG v Mediaprint, decided by the European Court of Justice in 1998. The case concerned access to Mediaprint's nationwide newspaper home-delivery system and became a frequently cited decision on refusal to deal and the essential facilities doctrine in EU competition law.

== Art ==
Bronner has worked as a painter and sculptor, particularly during his years in New York and again after withdrawing from day-to-day media management. ORF described him in 2023 as devoting much of his time to painting and sculpture.

Art historian Dieter Ronte wrote in 1985 that Bronner worked in series, moving from flowers and male figures to landscapes, portraits and nudes.

In 2025, Charim Galerie in Vienna presented Bronner's solo exhibition Figura Serpentinata, which showed new cast aluminium sculptures based on abstract geometric forms.

== Biography ==
In 2008, Austrian journalists Klaus Stimeder and Eva Weissenberger published a biography of Bronner titled Trotzdem – Die Oscar Bronner Story. It was later published in English as Despite Everything – The Oscar Bronner Story.
