= Marco Krainer =

Austrian specialty chef (born 1981)

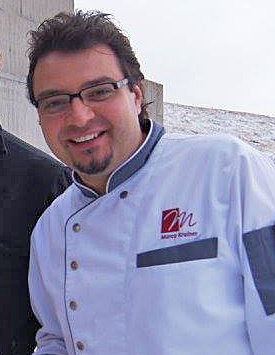
Marco Krainer

Marco Krainer (Marco Wolfgang Krainer, born October 4, 1981, in Linz, Upper Austria) is an Austrian specialty chef who works as a TV and Radio chef.

Krainer grew up in Carinthia, Austria's most southern province, where he also currently resides. In Carinthia, he attended the Culinary and Tourism Technical College in Oberwollanig by Villach, the same institution his colleague, Wolfgang Puck attended, who has become one of the most famous chefs in the United States.

Early on, Krainer became interested in public broadcast programs, which dealt with nutrition issues, particularly "Hobbythek" in the German Broadcast Station WDR. In February 2002, the first invitation came from the WDR Studio in Cologne, Germany. At first, Krainer was responsible for research and development of the recipes. Later, it was decided to give him time in front of the camera as "Hobbythek-Chef".

He is busy as show-chef for meetings, presentations, food shows and cooking classes. The unusual concept of "Cooking on the Radio" became very successful. On the Austrian regional Broadcast ORF Radio Carinthia, Krainer regularly cooks live in the studio.

In 2004, he presented to the audience an erotic menu during his debut at the TV station VOX (Hamburg, Germany) in the erotic magazine "Wa(h)re Liebe" (True love or love for sale) with Lilo Wanders whose program has achieved cult status.

Krainer's primary focus is on the American, Austrian, Italian and Asian cuisine. Because of his partiality to pumpkins, he had his own Hobbythek pumpkin program filmed in Krainer's private pumpkin patch in Austria.
