= Lore Krainer =

Austrian actress (1930–2020)

- Born: 4 November 1930; Graz, Styria, Austria
- Died: 3 July 2020 (aged 89) Oberwaltersdorf, Austria
- Occupations: Actress, restaurateur, cabaret singer-songwriter
- Instrument: Singing

Lore Krainer (4 November 1930 – 3 July 2020) was an Austrian actress, restaurateur, and cabaret singer-songwriter.

== Personal life ==
Krainer was born at Graz, Styria, and ran a restaurant, known as Girardi-Keller in Graz, where she performed with her own lyrics and songs. In 1972, she was engaged by Gerhard Bronner in his Cabaret Fledermaus. From 30 October 1978 to 28 June 2009, Krainer could be heard every Sunday morning in the radio cabaret Der Guglhupf founded by Bronner and Peter Wehle on Ö1 Listen. It was last broadcast on 28 June 2009. For several years, she appeared on the ORF television program Seniorenclub. In 1984, as the first non-Viennese, she was awarded the Nestroy-Ring.

In her free time she liked to play tarot, namely the variant Königrufen, and was known as "the doyenne of the Austrian tarot". She scored some tournament victories in this game. She died at Oberwaltersdorf, aged 89.
