= Falter =

Weekly news magazine published in Vienna, Austria

- Editor-in-chief: Armin Thurnher, Florian Klenk
- Categories: News magazine
- Frequency: Weekly
- Publisher: Falter Verlagsgesellschaft
- Founder: Walter Martin Kienreich
- Founded: 1977; 49 years ago
- Country: Austria
- Based in: Vienna
- Language: German
- Website: www.falter.at

Falter (English: 'Folder', 'Folded/flying dossier') is a weekly Austrian news magazine published in Vienna.

== History and profile ==
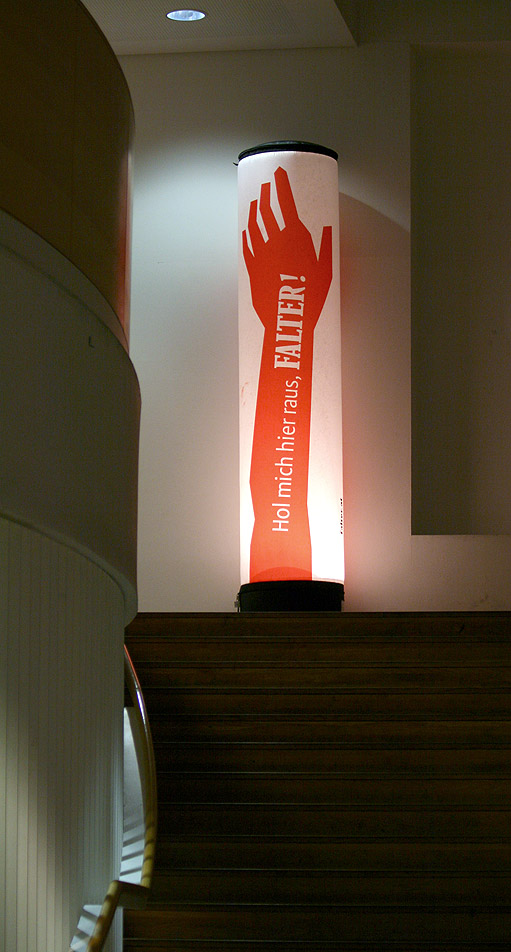
Slogan of the Viennese weekly magazine Falter at the presentation of the 2001 book Früher war hier das Ende der Welt – Reportagen by Florian Klenk

Established in 1977, Falter is published weekly on Wednesdays. The magazine was founded by Walter Martin Kienreich. The publisher is Falter Verlagsgesellschaft. The magazine has no political affiliation. Its headquarters is in Vienna.

Falter reports from a broadly left-liberal perspective on politics, media, culture and the life in Vienna. Since Spring 2005 a local edition has also been published in Styria. The weekly has a science supplement, Heureka, which is supported by the Austrian Ministry of Education and Science. The supplement features critical analyses of scientific activities, science policy, science/society relationships and university-based science and each issue focuses on a scientific topic, including genetics, science and politics among the others. It is distributed not only to the readers of Falter but also to university departments, the relevant ministries and other related institutions.

In addition to its original role as a magazine of the arts and social life, Falter has also developed a reputation for investigative journalism.

The 2007 circulation of Falter was 63,000 copies. In 2010 its circulation was 48,000 copies. Since then, print journalism has seen radical changes in Austria. The exact circulation of Falter is, for unexplained reasons, no longer reported to the "Auflagenkontrolle"; however, competitors report of "about 40,000 subscribers" in 2023 for Falter.

== See also ==
- List of magazines in Austria
