= Franz Schuh (writer) =

Austrian writer (born 1947)

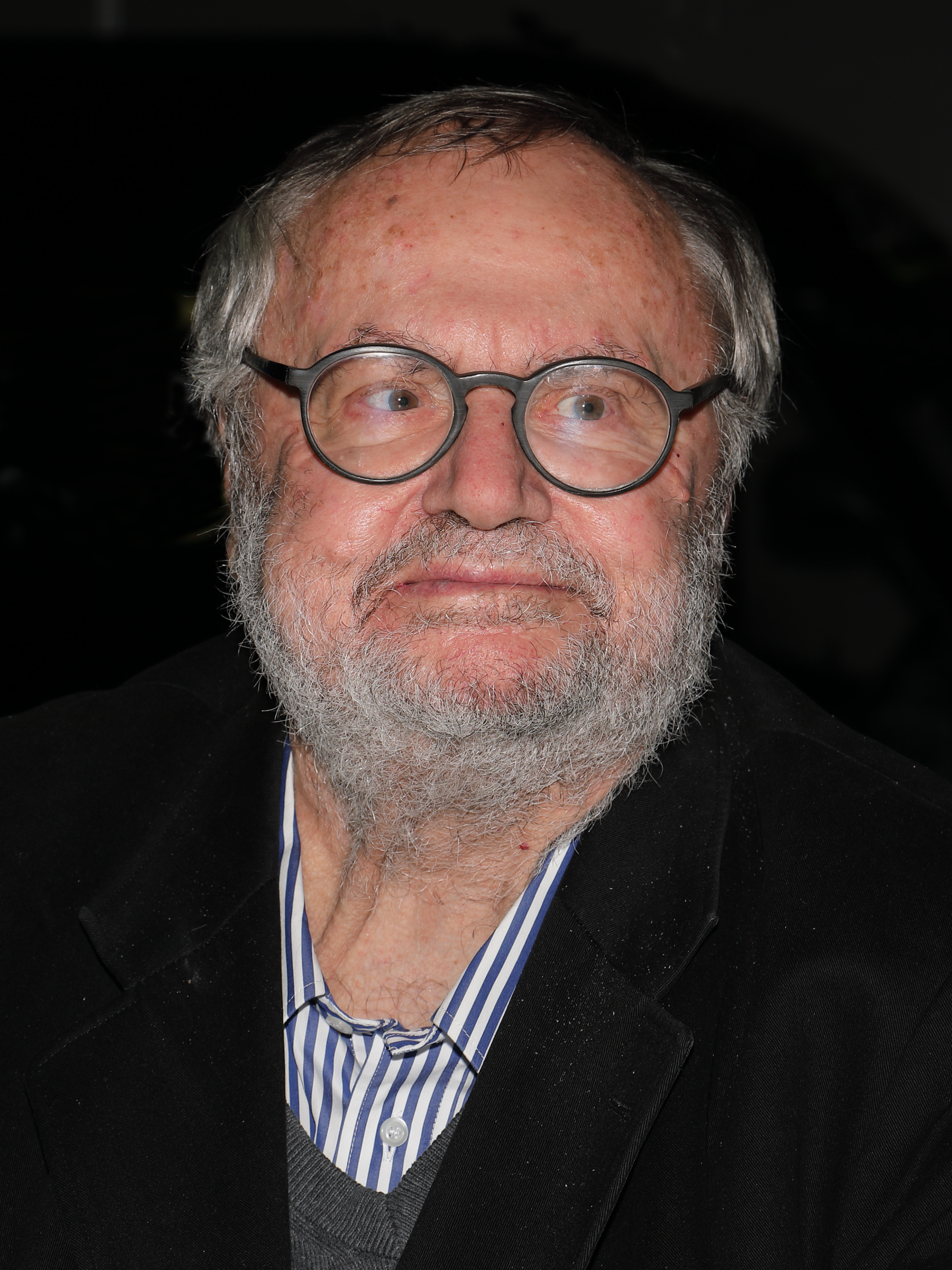
Franz Schuh in 2025

Franz Schuh (born 15 March 1947) is an Austrian novelist, literary critic and, above all, essayist in the tradition of Karl Kraus and Alfred Polgar. Schuh was born, and lives, in Vienna, where, just like his predecessors, he prefers to write in one of the traditional coffeehouses.

== Life ==
Franz Schuh studied philosophy, history and German studies in Vienna and graduated with his doctorate. 1976-80 he was Secretary General of the Grazer Autorenversammlung, then editor of "Wespennest" (wasp nest) and head of the essayist and literary program of the publisher Deuticke. He works as a freelancer for various broadcasters and national newspapers and as a lecturer at the University of Applied Arts Vienna. He was also a guest at the "Literaturhaus Wien" (House of Literature in Vienna). Since June 2009 he writes the column "Crime & Punishment" in the magazine Datum and talks a lot on the public radio program Ö1 among other things, in his "Magazine of happiness".

== Select bibliography ==
- Liebe, Macht und Heiterkeit (1985)
- Landnahme. Der österreichische Roman nach 1980 (1989)
- Schreibkräfte. Über Literatur, Glück und Unglück (2000)
- Der Stadtrat. Eine Idylle (2000)
- Schwere Vorwürfe, schmutzige Wäsche (Heavy Reproaches, Dirty Linen) (Leipzig Book Fair Prize, 2006).

Schuh also edited the Peter-Henisch-Reader Figurenwerfen (2003).

== Awards ==
- 1986: Austrian State Prize for Cultural Journalism
- 1987: City of Vienna Award for Journalism (Preis der Stadt Wien für Publizistik)
- 2000: Jean Améry Prize
- 2006: Leipzig Book Fair Prize, category "Sachbuch/Essayistik", for Schwere Vorwürfe, schmutzige Wäsche
- 2006: Davos Swiss Media Award for outstanding achievement in journalism
- 2009: Essay Prize Tractatus, Philosophicum Lech
- 2022: Honorary doctor, University of Klagenfurt
