= Format (magazine) =

Business magazine in Austria (1998–2015)

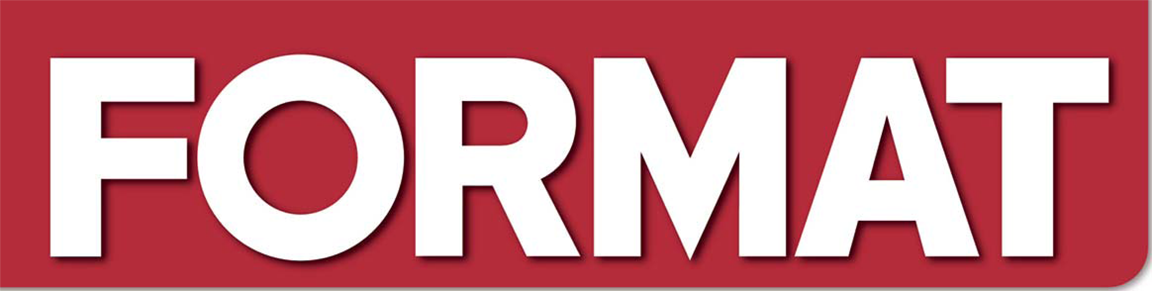
- Logo of Format magazine
- Categories: Business magazine
- Frequency: Weekly
- Publisher: Verlagsgruppe NEWS
- Founded: 1998
- Final issue: 21 December 2015
- Company: Gruner + Jahr
- Country: Austria
- Based in: Vienna
- Language: German
- Website: www.format.at

Format (stylized in all caps) was a weekly finance and business magazine published in Austria and headquartered in Vienna. The magazine existed between 1998 and 21 December 2015.

== History and profile ==
Format was established in 1998. The magazine had its headquarters in Vienna and was published weekly on Fridays. The publisher was the Verlagsgruppe NEWS. Gruner + Jahr had a stake in the magazine.

Format covered topics mainly on business, politics, culture and lifestyles. The magazine also featured the views of bankers, trade experts and financiers. One of its former editors-in-chief is Peter Pelinka.

The magazine merged with its sister publication Trend at the end of 2015. The last issue of Format was published on 21 December 2015.

== Circulation ==
Format had a circulation of 68,000 copies in 2003. Its circulation was 50,000 copies in 2007. The sold circulation of the weekly was 47,155 copies in 2009. In 2010 its circulation was 61,000 copies. Its circulation in 2012 was 31,021 copies. The circulation of the magazine during the first half of 2013 increased to 39,296 copies. The magazine sold 50,000 copies in 2014.

== See also ==
- List of magazines in Austria
