= Trend (magazine) =

Business magazine published in Austria

- Categories: Business magazine
- Frequency: Monthly (1974-2015); Weekly (2016-present)
- Publisher: Verlagsgruppe NEWS
- Founded: 1969; 57 years ago
- Company: Verlagsgruppe NEWS
- Country: Austria
- Based in: Vienna
- Language: German
- Website: trend

Trend (stylized in all lowercase) is an Austrian weekly business magazine headquartered in Vienna. Founded in 1969, the magazine is one of the oldest publications in its category in the country.

== History and profile ==
Trend was established in Vienna in 1969 by Oscar Bronner, being the first independent business magazine in Austria.

In 1974, Trend was sold to the Verlagsgruppe NEWS. The magazine was published monthly with a size of 210 x 280 mm. It targets senior executives, entrepreneurs, and decision-makers, as well as Austria's intelligentsia. They are among the pioneers of investigative journalism in the country and publishes a list of Best Workplaces in Austria.

In December 2015, Trend merged with its sister magazine, Format. Its frequency also was switched to weekly on 22 January 2016.

== Circulation ==
Trend had a circulation of 72,000 copies in the mid-1980s. The monthly magazine sold 68,000 copies in 2003. Its circulation was 50,000 copies in 2007. The circulation of the magazine was 60,067 copies in 2010. It decreased to 47,248 copies during the first half of 2013.

== See also ==
- List of magazines in Austria
