= News (Austrian magazine) =

News magazine in Austria

- Former editors: Senta Ziegler; Peter Pelinka
- Categories: News magazine
- Frequency: Weekly
- Founder: Helmut Fellner; Wolfgang Fellner
- Founded: 1992
- First issue: October 1992
- Company: VGN
- Country: Austria
- Based in: Vienna
- Language: German
- Website: News

News is an Austrian weekly news magazine published in German and based in Vienna, Austria. The weekly is the major news magazine in the country and has been in circulation since October 1992.

== History and profile ==
News magazine was established by Helmut and Wolfgang Fellner and was first published in October 1992. The Verlagsgruppe News is the publisher of the magazine which is published weekly. The Fellner brothers sold the some shares of the company to Gruner + Jahr, a subsidiary of Bertelsmann. In 2016 Gruner + Jahr sold its shares to the Verlagsgruppe News, known as VGN.

News covers entertainment and lifestyle topics as well as news on current affairs, politics and culture.

In the 1990s Senta Ziegler served as the editor-in-chief of the magazine. Until 2008 Andreas Weber was the editor-in-chief of the weekly. Then Atha Athanasiadis served as the editor-in-chief of the News magazine from 2008 to February 2010. As of 2010 the editor-in-chief of the magazine was Peter Pelinka who was appointed to the post in February that year. Corinna Milborn and Silvia Meister were the deputy editors of the weekly.

== Circulation ==
News sold more than 200,000 copies in 1993. The market share of the magazine was 19.3% in 2000. The magazine had a circulation of 254,000 copies in 2003. Its readership in 2005 was about 14%, making it the first in its category. In 2007 the magazine sold 285,000 copies.

For the first half of 2008 the magazine had a circulation of 125,710 copies. It was the third best-selling magazine in the country in 2008. News sold 215,000 copies in 2010. In 2012 its circulation was 125.751 copies, and it was 135,875 copies in the first half of 2013.

== Incidents ==
In June 2005, News was fined by an Austrian court following its publication of Finance Minister Karl Heinz Grasser's photos kissing Fiona Swarovski, an heiress of the Swarovski crystal dynasty.

== See also ==
List of magazines in Austria
